= Muktikā =

Sanskrit-language anthology of 108 Upaniṣhads

Muktikā (Sanskrit: मुक्तिका) refers to the Sanskrit-language anthology of a canon of 108 Upaniṣhads. The date of composition of each is unknown, with the oldest probably from about 800 BCE. The Principal Upanishads were composed in the 1st millennium BCE, most Yoga Upanishads composed probably from the 100 BCE to 300 CE period, and seven of the Sannyasa Upanishads composed before the 3rd century CE.

The canon is part of a dialogue between Rama and Hanuman dealing with the inquiry into mukti in the Muktikā Upanishad (108 in the list). The other collections of Upanishads include Oupanekhat, a Persian language anthology of 50 Upanishads; the Colebrooke Collection of 52 Upanishads, and the 52 Upanishad Collection of Nārāyana.

== The canon ==
The canon is part of a dialogue between Rama and Hanuman. Rama proposes to teach Vedanta, saying "Even by reading one verse of them [any Upanishad] with devotion, one gets the status of union with me, which is hard to get even by sages." Hanuman inquires about the different kinds of "liberation" (or mukti, hence the name of the Upanishad), to which Rama answers, "The only real type [of liberation] is Kaivalya."

The list of 108 Upanishads is introduced in verses 26-29:

But by what means does one attain the Kaivalya kind of Moksha? The Mandukya [Upanishad] is enough; if knowledge is not attained from it, then study the Ten Upanishads. Attaining knowledge very quickly, you will reach my abode. If certainty is not attained even then, study the 32 Upanishads and stop. If desiring Moksha without the body, read the 108 Upanishads. Hear their order.

Most scholars list ten upanishads as principal, or the Mukhya Upanishads, while some consider eleven, twelve or thirteen as principal, or the most important Upanishads (highlighted).

The list of 108 names is given in verses 30–39. They are as follows:

1. Isha Upanishad
2. Kena Upanishad
3. Katha Upanishad
4. Prashna Upanishad
5. Mundaka Upanishad
6. Mandukya Upanishad
7. Taittiriya Upanishad
8. Aitareya Upanishad
9. Chandogya Upanishad
10. Brihadaranyaka Upanishad
11. Brahma Upanishad
12. Kaivalya Upanishad
13. Jabala Upanishad
14. Shvetashvatara Upanishad
15. Hamsopanishad
16. Aruneya Upanishad
17. Garbhopanishad
18. Narayanopanishad
19. Paramahamsopanishad
20. Amritabindu Upanishad
21. Amritanada Upanishad
22. Atharvashiras Upanishad
23. Atharvashikha Upanishad
24. Maitrayaniya Upanishad
25. Kaushitaki Upanishad
26. Brihajjabala Upanishad
27. Nrisimha Tapaniya Upanishad
28. Kalagni Rudra Upanishad
29. Maitreya Upanishad
30. Subala Upanishad
31. Kshurika Upanishad
32. Mantrika Upanishad
33. Sarvasara Upanishad
34. Niralamba Upanishad
35. Shukarahasya Upanishad
36. Vajrasuchi Upanishad
37. Tejobindu Upanishad
38. Nada Bindu Upanishad
39. Dhyanabindu Upanishad
40. Brahmavidya Upanishad
41. Yogatattva Upanishad
42. Atmabodha Upanishad
43. Naradaparivrajaka Upanishad
44. Trishikhibrahmana Upanishad
45. Sita Upanishad
46. Yogachudamani Upanishad
47. Nirvana Upanishad
48. Mandala-brahmana Upanishad
49. Dakshinamurti Upanishad
50. Sharabha Upanishad
51. Skanda Upanishad
52. Mahanarayana Upanishad
53. Advayataraka Upanishad
54. Rama Rahasya Upanishad
55. Rama tapaniya Upanishad
56. Vasudeva Upanishad
57. Mudgala Upanishad
58. Shandilya Upanishad
59. Paingala Upanishad
60. Bhikshuka Upanishad
61. Maha Upanishad
62. Sariraka Upanishad
63. Yogashikha Upanishad
64. Turiyatitavadhuta Upanishad
65. Brihat-Sannyasa Upanishad
66. Paramahamsa Parivrajaka Upanishad
67. Malika Upanishad
68. Avyakta Upanishad
69. Ekakshara Upanishad
70. Annapurna Upanishad
71. Surya Upanishad
72. Akshi Upanishad
73. Adhyatma Upanishad
74. Kundika Upanishad
75. Savitri Upanishad
76. Atma Upanishad
77. Pashupatabrahma Upanishad
78. Parabrahma Upanishad
79. Avadhuta Upanishad
80. Tripuratapini Upanishad
81. Devi Upanishad
82. Tripura Upanishad
83. Kathashruti Upanishad
84. Bhavana Upanishad
85. Rudrahridaya Upanishad
86. Yoga-Kundalini Upanishad
87. Bhasma Upanishad
88. Rudraksha Upanishad
89. Ganapati Upanishad
90. Darshana Upanishad
91. Tarasara Upanishad
92. Mahavakya Upanishad
93. Pancabrahma Upanishad
94. Pranagnihotra Upanishad
95. Gopala Tapani Upanishad
96. Krishna Upanishad
97. Yajnavalkya Upanishad
98. Varaha Upanishad
99. Shatyayaniya Upanishad
100. Hayagriva Upanishad
101. Dattatreya Upanishad
102. Garuda Upanishad
103. Kali-Santarana Upanishad
104. Jabali Upanishad
105. Saubhagyalakshmi Upanishad
106. Sarasvati-rahasya Upanishad
107. Bahvricha Upanishad
108. Muktikā Upanishad (this text)

== Transmission ==
Almost all printed editions of ancient Vedas and Upanishads depend on the late manuscripts that are hardly older than 500 years, not on the still-extant and superior oral tradition. Michael Witzel explains this oral tradition as follows:

The Vedic texts were orally composed and transmitted, without the use of script, in an unbroken line of transmission from teacher to student that was formalized early on. This ensured an impeccable textual transmission superior to the classical texts of other cultures; it is, in fact, something like a tape-recording.... Not just the actual words, but even the long-lost musical (tonal) accent (as in old Greek or in Japanese) has been preserved up to the present.

== Categories ==
In this canon,

- 10 upaniṣads are associated with the Rigveda and have the śānti beginning vaṇme-manasi.
- 16 upaniṣads are associated with the Samaveda and have the śānti beginning āpyāyantu.
- 19 upaniṣads are associated with the Shukla Yajurveda and have the śānti beginning pūrṇamada.
- 32 upaniṣads are associated with the Krishna Yajurveda and have the śānti beginning sahanāvavatu.
- 31 upaniṣads are associated with the Atharvaveda and have the śānti beginning bhadram-karṇebhiḥ.

The first 13 are grouped as mukhya ("principal"), and 21 are grouped as Sāmānya Vedānta ("common Vedanta"). The remainder are associated with five different schools or sects within Hinduism, 20 with Sannyāsa (asceticism), 8 with Shaktism, 14 with Vaishnavism, 12 with Shaivism and 20 with Yoga.

	Shukla Yajurveda	Krishna Yajurveda	Atharvaveda	Samaveda	Ṛgveda
Mukhya; these form the core of ancient texts, predating classical Hinduism; they span the 1st millennium BCE and reflect the emergence of Vedanta from Vedic religion.	Īṣa; Bṛhadāraṇyaka	Kaṭha; Taittirīya; Śvetāśvatara	Praśna; Muṇḍaka; Māṇḍūkya	Kena; Chāndogya; Maitrāyaṇi	Kauśītāki; Aitareya
Sāmānya; These are general Upanishads, and do not focus on any specific post-classical Hindu tradition. Some are referred to as Vedantic Upanishads.	Subāla; Mantrikā; Nirālamba; Paiṅgala; Adhyātmā; Muktikā	Sarvasāra; Śukarahasya; Skanda; Śārīraka; Garbha; Ekākṣara; Akṣi; Prāṇāgnihotra	Sūrya; Ātmā	Vajrasūchi; Maha; Sāvitrī	Ātmabodha; Mudgala
Sannyāsa These are Upanishads that focus on renunciation-related themes and the life of a sannyasi (monk)	Jābāla; Paramahaṃsa; Advayatāraka; Bhikṣuka; Turīyātīta; Yājñavalkya; Śāṭyāyaniya	Brahma; Tejobindu; Avadhūta; Kaṭharudra	Nāradaparivrājaka; Paramahaṃsa parivrājaka Parabrahma	Āruṇeya; Maitreya; Sannyāsa; Kuṇḍika	Nirvāṇa
Śākta These are Upanishads that focus on goddess Devi-related themes		Sarasvatīrahasya	Sītā; Annapūrṇa; Devī; Tripurātapini; Bhāvana		Tripura; Saubhāgya Lakshmi; Bahvṛca
Vaiṣṇava These are Upanishads that focus on god Vishnu-related themes	Tārasāra	Nārāyaṇa; Kali-Saṇṭāraṇa	Nṛsiṃhatāpanī; Mahānārāyaṇa; Rāmarahasya; Rāmatāpaṇi; Gopālatāpani; Kṛṣṇa; Hayagrīva; Dattātreya; Gāruḍa	Vāsudeva; Avyakta	
Śaiva These are Upanishads that focus on god Shiva-related themes		Kaivalya; Kālāgnirudra; Dakṣiṇāmūrti; Rudrahṛdaya; Pañcabrahma	Atharvashiras; Atharvaśikha; Bṛhajjābāla; Śarabha; Bhasma; Gaṇapati	Rudrākṣa; Jābāli	Akṣamālika (Mālika)
Yoga These are Upanishads that focus on Yoga-related themes	Haṃsa; Triśikhi; Maṇḍalabrāhmaṇa	Amṛtabindu; Amṛtanāda; Kṣurika; Dhyānabindu; Brahmavidyā; Yogatattva; Yogaśikhā; Yogakuṇḍalinī; Varāha	Śāṇḍilya; Pāśupata; Mahāvākya	Yogachūḍāmaṇi; Darśana	Nādabindu
