= Avadhutaka Upanishad =

Minor Upanishad of Hinduism

Avadhuta Upanishad
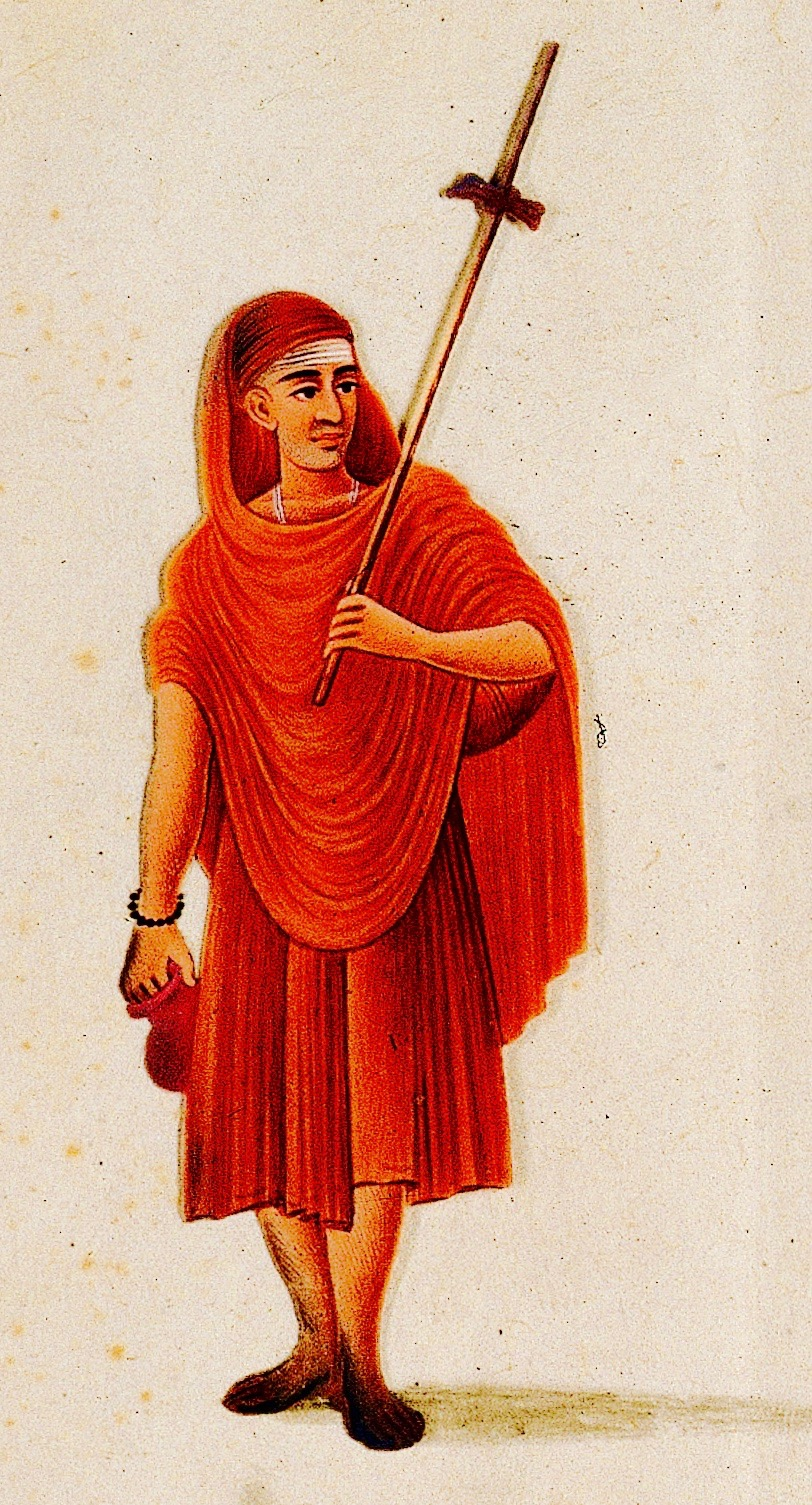
- The text discusses the life of a liberated monk
- Devanagari: अवधूत
- IAST: Avadhūta
- Title means: Liberated person
- Date: 14th or 15th century
- Type: Sannyasa
- Linked Veda: Krishna Yajurveda
- Chapters: 2
- Philosophy: Vaishnavism, Vedanta

The Avadhuta Upanishad (अवधूत उपनिषद) is a medieval era Sanskrit text and is one of the minor Upanishads of Hinduism. The text is attached to the Krishna Yajurveda, and is one of the 20 Sannyasa (renunciation) Upanishads. The text is also titled the Brihadavadhuta Upanishad, Laghuavadhuta Upanishad, and the Avadhutopanishad.

The text exists in two parts called major (Brihad) and minor (Laghu). The major part describes the nature and characteristics of an Avadhuta, literally the liberated person, also called a Jivanmukta. The minor part is a short allegorical summary of eight limb Yoga, that the text asserts is part of the Avadhuta lifestyle.

== History ==
The date or author of Avadhuta Upanishad is unclear, but given its literary style and the texts it references, it is likely a medieval era text. Olivelle and Sprockhoff date it around 14th- to 15th-century.

Manuscripts of this text are also found alternatively titled as Avadhutopanisad. The text is listed at number 79 in the Telugu language anthology of 108 Upanishads of the Muktika canon, narrated by Rama to Hanuman.

== Contents ==
The text exists in two parts called Brihad-Avadhuta (large or major) and Laghu-Avadhuta (small or minor).

The Brihad-avadhuta Upanishad opens with Sankriti asking Dattatreya, "Who is an Avadhuta? What is his state and conduct? Dattatreya appears in several Sannyasa Upanishads including the Avadhuta Upanishad, states Rigopoulos, because he symbolizes the mastery of yoga and the perfectly liberated individual (Avadhuta) in ancient and medieval Hindu texts.

Dattatreya replies, asserts the Avadhuta Upanishad, that the word Avadhuta consists of four syllables, each of which come from four concepts. "A" comes from Akshara (alphabet) or that which is imperishable, "Va" comes from Varenya or excellent, "Dhu" comes from Dhuta (shaken off) and Ta comes from Tat or that. Avadhuta, states the Upanishad, is that person who has shaken off the world, is imperishable excellence, with the knowledge of that (Brahman), who is always driven by his Atman (self, soul) alone, who has transcended discriminating against or for anyone by their varna (class) or stage of life. He lives in bliss, he wanders without care or unconcerned how he looks. His ritual is to make offerings internally in his body, and he condemns all external sacrifices.

The Brihad-avadhuta text is notable, states Patrick Olivelle, for referencing and incorporating fragments of or complete hymns from the Bhagavad Gita, Brihat-Sannyasa Upanishad, Pachadasi and other older texts. The incorporated ideas, states Olivelle, include those such as, "Avadhuta is always in peace because he never clings or craves for anything", and that the liberated man is one who does not care about heavenly afterlife, because he considers all the worlds as his self and his current life is as complete as it can be. The liberated man has done what all there is to do, states the Upanishad, and this Avadhuta continues his journey for the welfare of the world as required by the Vedas, for that is what he wants. Nothing hurts him as he considers himself neither the agent nor affected no matter what happens, he is content that he acts according to his soul. He feels, "I am fortunate, I know myself, how wonderful we are, O what knowledge, O what happiness, O what scripture, O what a teacher" I have, states the Upanishad.

The Laghu-avadhuta Upanishad is the Yoga part of the text. It opens by stating the eight limbs in a manner similar to Patanjali's Yogasutras. Yamas, asserts the text, is the discipline that detaches one from being controlled by one's senses. Niyamas is that behavior that leads to constant attachment to the truth, defines the Upanishad. Asanas is that posture which leads to indifference towards everything in the world. The goal of Yoga is achieving Samadhi, states the text, and it is the state of mental absorption where one is in total oblivion. He thus isolates his soul, he thus separates himself from all delusions in life, and attains the nature of supreme steadfastness. Thus he reaches Kaivalya, asserts the Upanishad.

== See also ==
- Jabala Upanishad
- Nirvana Upanishad
- Paramahamsa Upanishad
- Yogatattva Upanishad
