= Mandala-brahmana Upanishad =

Sanskrit text, linked to Shukla Yajurveda

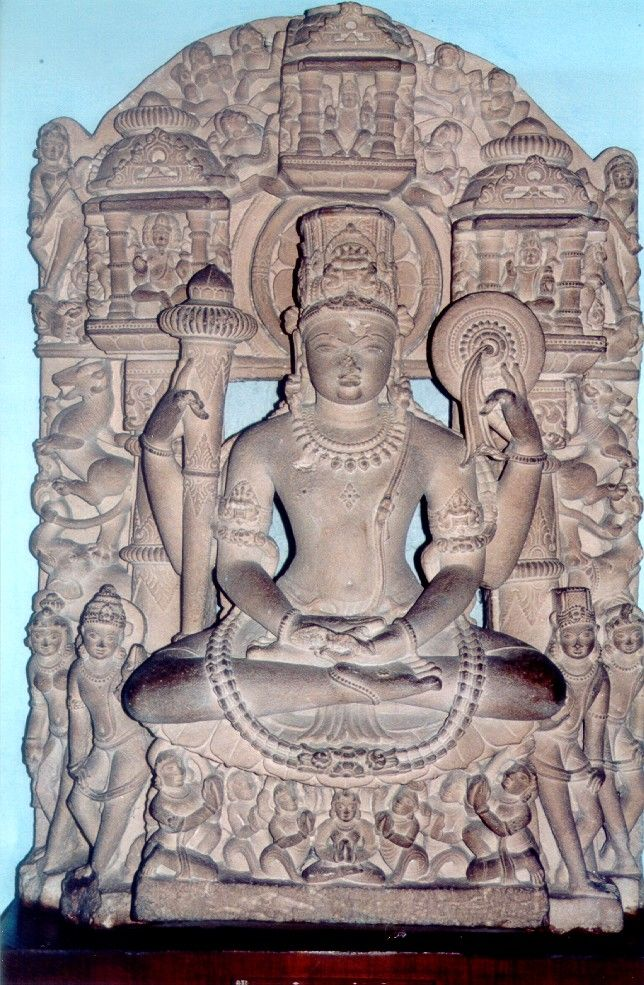
- Narayana (Vishnu) teaches yoga in this Upanishad.
- Devanagari: मण्डलब्राह्मण
- IAST: Maṇḍala-brāhmaṇa
- Title means: Teachings of Purusha in Sun
- Type: Yoga
- Linked Veda: Shukla Yajurveda
- Chapters: 5
- Philosophy: Yoga, Vedanta

The Mandala-brahmana Upanishad (Sanskrit: मण्डलब्राह्मण उपनिषत्), also known as Mandalabrahmanopanisad, is one of the minor Upanishads of Hinduism and a Sanskrit text. It is attached to the Shukla Yajurveda and is classified as one of the 20 Yoga Upanishads.

The text describes Yoga as a means to self-knowledge, the highest wisdom. Its text is structured as a teaching from Narayana (Purusha in Sun, Vishnu) to sage Yajnavalkya. The text is notable for teaching eight step Yoga but with somewhat different conceptual framework than most other texts. The teachings of the text combine different types of Yoga with non-dual Vedanta philosophy.

== History ==
The date and author of this text is unknown. Gavin Flood dates this and other Yoga Upanishads, to be probably from early 1st-millennium CE, but Raman states that it is probably a late Upanishad, composed after the 10th-century, because parts of it reflects Hatha Yoga traditions. Other scholars state that the composition date of the text is uncertain, and place it as a Hatha yoga or Raja yoga text.

Mandala means sphere, and the text is known as Mandala-brahmana Upanishad because the Purusha in the sphere of the Sun (Narayana) gave this knowledge to Yagnavalakya.

The Mandala-brahmana Upanishad (IAST: Maṇḍalabrāhmaṇa Upaniṣad) is listed at number 48 in the Telugu language anthology of 108 Upanishads of the Muktika canon, narrated by Rama to Hanuman.

== Contents ==
The Mandala brahmana Upanishad is structured as five Mandala (books, or Brahmana in some manuscripts), each with varying number of chapters. It opens with a praise for the Vedic sage Yajnavalkya, who the text asserts went to the world of Surya (Sun), where he meets the Purusha of the Sun, asks, "Pray, tell me all the tattva (truth) about the Atman (soul, self)?" The Upanishad states that Narayana, the Purusha of the Sun, answers with a discourse on eightfold Yoga along with Jnana.

=== The eight limbs of yoga ===
The answer in the first book (Brahmana) of the text, is structured as an eight limb yoga similar in form to Patanjali's eight limbed yoga system, but with significant differences. There are four Yamas and nine Niyamas, states the text, in contrast to five Yamas and five Niyamas in Yogasutras for example. The Yamas in Mandalabrahmana text are described as patience and tranquility under all circumstances no matter what, steadiness and non-swaying in one's mind, self-restraint from all cravings of senses, and the conquest over the extremes such as cold and heat, excess of or starving oneself of food and sleep.

The Niyamas

Devotion to one's guru,
love of true path,
enjoyment of objects producing happiness,
internal satisfaction,
freedom from association,
living in a retired place,
the controlling of the manas,
not longing after fruits of action,
and a state of vairagya,
all these constitute Niyamas.

—Mandalabrahmana Upanishad 1.1.4
Translated by Parmeshwaranand

The nine Niyamas, states the text, are devotion to one's guru (teacher), love and attachment for truth, seeking and enjoying happiness, being driven by inner satisfaction, independence from everyone else, living in an isolated place of silence and solitude, lack of covetousness and craving for fruit of one's efforts, and vairagya (indifference to the world, spiritual detachment).

The right posture (asana) is one that is comfortable and one can maintain for a long time, states the text. The yogi may be dressed in rags or barks. In this posture, asserts the text, the yogi should practice Pranayama, that is proper Puraka (inhalation), Kumbhaka (holding the breath) and Recaka (exhalation) of 16, 64 and 32 matras (beats). Pratyahara, the Upanishad defines as restraining the mind from being driven by the sensory objects. Dhyana is contemplating the oneness of consciousness in all, asserts the text. Dharana, states the text, is singular focus of consciousness. Samadhi is the state where one forgets oneself and is in complete absorption within. These are the eight limbs, which empowers one to achieve mukti (liberation), asserts Mandalabrahmana Upanishad.

The yogi's untrained body starts with five inherent defects, namely anger, fear, improper exhalation, spiritual-sleep and lust. These defects, asserts the text, can be removed by kshama (forgiveness), non-carelessness with removal of dual notions, moderation in food, devotion to finding the truth, and sankalpa (conviction against craving).

=== Taraka ===
Taraka, literally "to cross", asserts the text, is achieved by a yogi when he realizes Brahman which is satcitananda (existence-consciousness-bliss). This is achieved by introspection, states Mandalabrahmana, and it is of three types – internal introspection, external introspection and intermediate introspection. The three introspections are defined and described by the text in Tantra terminology in sections 1.2 and 1.3.

Dhyana

Dhyana is the contemplation of
the unity of consciousness,
within all.

—Mandalabrahmana Upanishad 1.1.9

In section 1.3, the text states that Taraka is of two types, Murti-taraka and Amurti-taraka. The former is that which relies on external perception, the latter relies on inner meditative process. The goal of internal introspection is to realize the Purusha Brahman within oneself, and all of which is only the Atman (soul) asserts the Upanishad.

=== Jyotir-atman ===
The second book (mandala) of the text asserts that the Jyotir-atman (radiant soul) is the fundamental support of all beings. This is of two forms, one qualified and another unqualified. These two are discussed by the text in Hatha yoga terminology in sections 2.1 and 2.2.

In verse 2.2.4 and 2.2.5, the Upanishad states that the yogi must repudiate all external rituals, and substitute them with inner meditation, asserting that meditation in the pursuit of knowledge is the Amanaska (no outward perception) state and the worship of Brahman within oneself. This leads to Samadhi and the knowledge of Brahman, asserts the text.

=== Non-mindedness, unmani state ===
The book three of the Mandalabrahmana describes the non-mindedness. It defines the non-mindedness as turning away from one's orientation from the worldly to the spiritual. This unmani state, it asserts to be one where one understands the fullness of "Thou art I".

=== Raja yoga ===
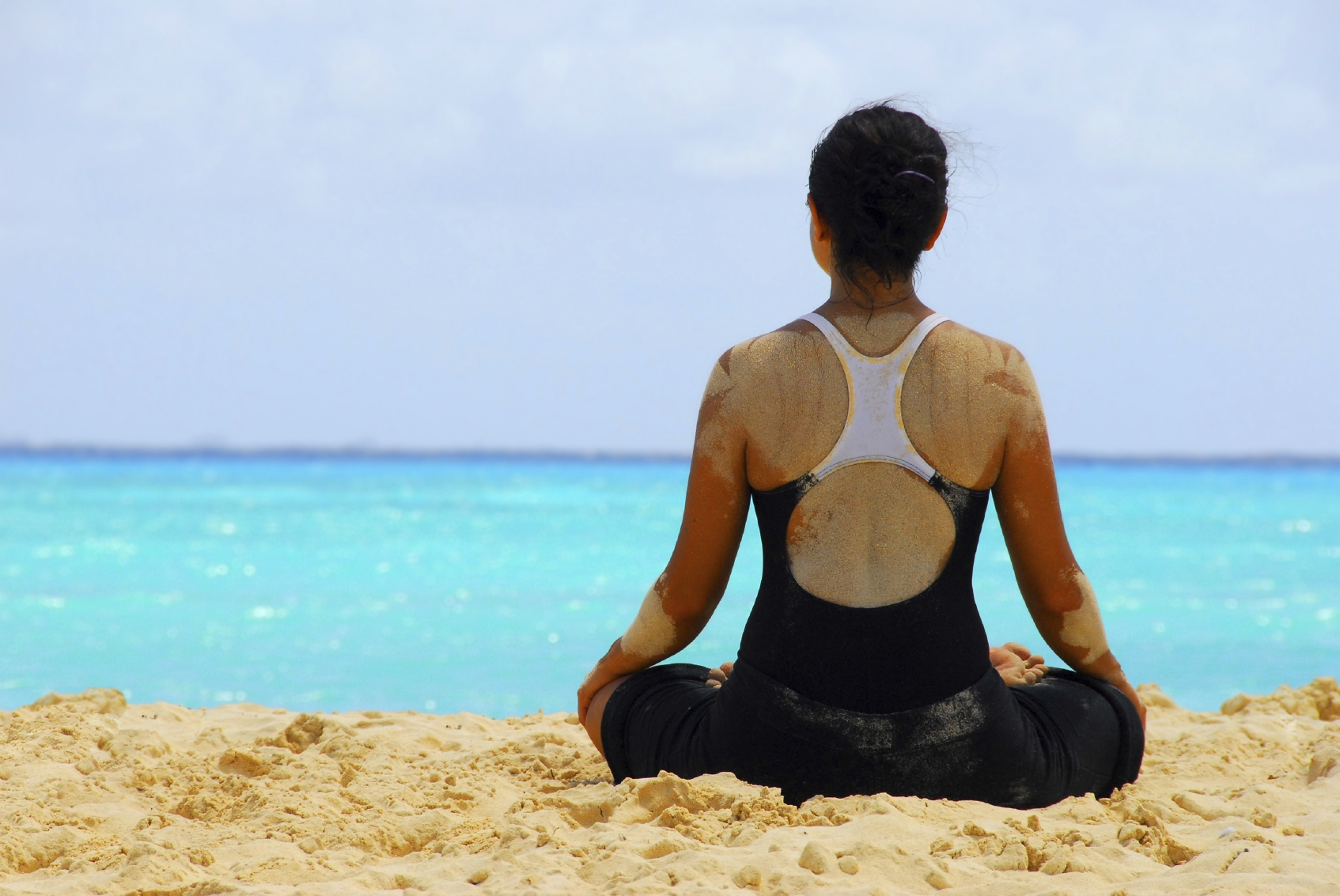
The text recommends meditative yoga

The book four and five of the Upanishad are short, and discuss Raja yoga (meditative) with tantra woven in.

In book 4 the Upanishad describes five forms of space (ether) as Akash, Parakash, Mahakash, Suryakas and Paramakash. The Akash space is of the nature of darkness, the Parakash states the text is of the nature of fire of the deluge, and the fire (radiance) is Mahakash. The Suryakash is space in the brightness of the sun, while the brightness combined with bliss is Paramakash. The Yogin who views the nature of space, this way, becomes all these natures.

A mind influenced and controlled by worldly objects is the cause of bondage, asserts the Upanishad in book 5, and the mind that isn't so is ready for spiritual liberation. It is the mind, states the text, which creates, preserves and destroys dissatisfaction. It is the mind which can also become pure and secondless, by realizing the absence of difference, states the Mandalabrahmana. The yogin who understands this, is ever content, his conduct in the world is like that of a child, he is temperate in his eating habits and his excretion is diminished, yet he is strong in his body. Nothing matters to such a yogin anymore, he has accomplished the non-dual state, he realises the Brahman, he attains the nature of bliss. Such is the yogin who has drunk the nectar of the Brahman knowledge.

== See also ==
- Nirvana Upanishad
- Yoga (philosophy)
- Yoga Vasistha
- Yoga Yajnavalkya
