= Jabali Upanishad =

Jabali
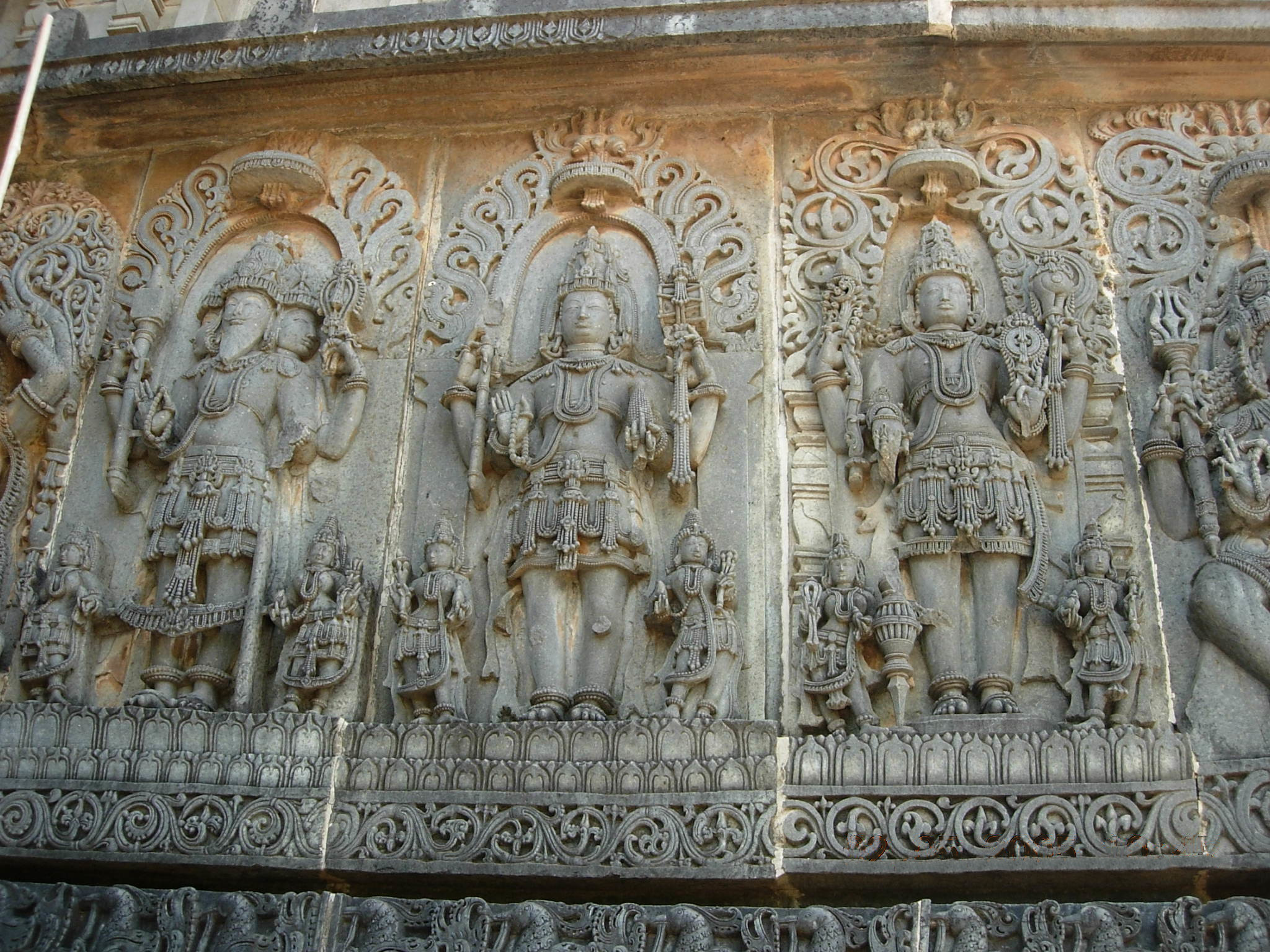
- Trinity – Brahma, Maheshwara, Vishnu
- Devanagari: जबालि
- IAST: jābāli
- Title means: A Vedic sage
- Type: Shaiva
- Linked Veda: Samaveda
- Chapters: 1
- Philosophy: Shaivism

The Jabali Upanishad (Sanskrit: जबालि उपनिषत्), also called Jabalyupanishad (IAST: Jābālyupaniṣad), is a Sanskrit text and one of the minor Upanishads of Hinduism. It is attached to the Samaveda, and classified as is one of the Shaiva Upanishads.

It is a short Upanishad, and structured as a discourse between sage Jabali to sage Pippalada, and is notable for presenting the Pashupata theology. It explains what Pashu and Pata means, and the Vibhuti (ash) on one's forehead as a reminder of transitory nature of life, the unchanging universality of Shiva, and as a means of one's salvation.

== History ==
The title of the text is named after sage Jabali, famous in Hindu mythology, and who features in the Hindu epic Ramayana.

In the Telugu language anthology of 108 Upanishads of the Muktika canon, narrated by Rama to Hanuman, it is listed at number 104.

== Contents ==
The text opens with sage Pippalada asking sage Jabali the questions, "what is the Ultimate Reality? who is Jiva? who is Pashu? Who is Pati? and how can one achieve Salvation?"

Jabali asserts that the answers to these questions were realized by Ishana (a form of Shiva) through meditation. Pashupati, or Shiva, is the Ultimate Reality, the only Reality, states verse 8 of the text.

The Jiva, asserts the Upanishad in verse 9, is that living organism when Ahamkara (ego) has transmigrated into its body. All Jiva including human beings are Pashu (animals) in different forms, and the Pata (lord) of all the Jiva is Pashupata state verses 10 through 13 of the text.

Everyone is a Pashu, states verse 14 of the Upanishad, because like beasts, everyone eats food, everyone lacks the discrimination between the changing world and the unchanging world, everyone is bothered by suffering and misery, everyone is controlled by someone else.

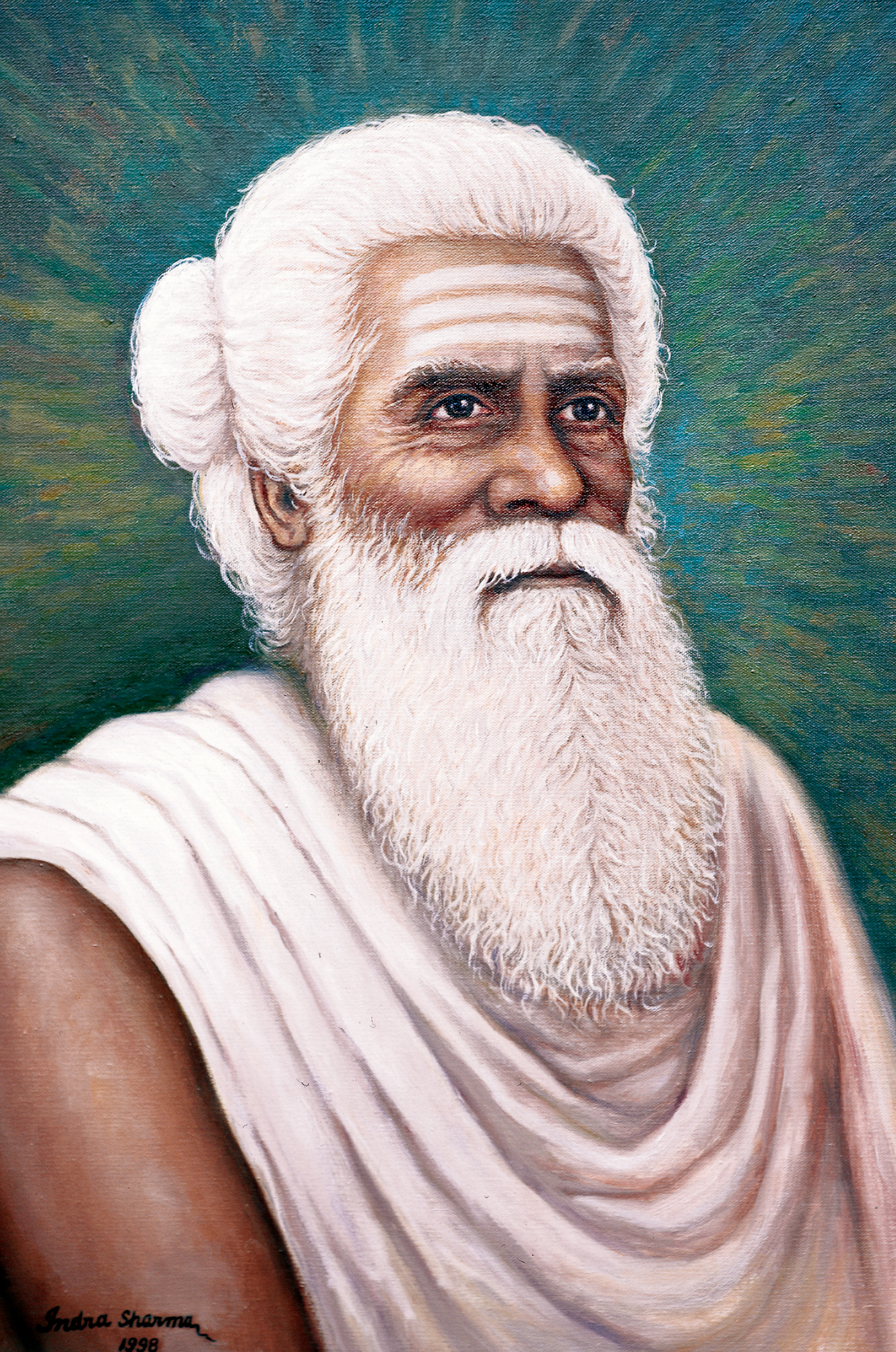
The supposed portrait of Jnana guru Siva Yogaswami from the Nandinatha (Shaiva) Sampradaya demonstrates three lines of the forehead suggested in the Jabali Upanishad

Sage Pippalada then asks Jabali if there is a way to gain this knowledge, one by which one is liberated unto salvation. Jabali answers yes, and the first step, he asserts, is to smear oneself with holy ash, reciting and remembering the mantra that everything is or will soon become ash. This, asserts the text in verse 19, is what Vedas discusses. Combine the holy ash or Bhasma in water, apply it as three streaks to the head, forehead, and shoulders, simultaneously reciting the hymns trayayusham and tryambakam as prayer to "Shambhava" (Lord Shiva).

How should the three lines be applied, Jabali is asked. The text states in verse 22, the three lines should occupy all of the forehead. The three lines signify the trimurti of Brahma, Vishnu and Shiva. The top line represents “Garhapathya” agni or home fire, syllable “Aa” of AUM, one's own body (self), Rajas guna, the power to act, the Rigveda, ushakala (twilight hour) or early morning hour, and is the personification of Brahma. The second streak or the middle line denotes "Dakshinagni", syllable “Uu” of AUM, Sattva Guṇa (virtue), atman (soul, innermost self), the power to will, Yajurveda, midday, and is the personification of Vishnu. The third streak of bhasma or ash line represents the "Ahavaniya agni", the syllable "Ma" of AUM, the Supreme Self (Brahman), the power to know, the heavens, Tamas guna, Samaveda, evening time, and is personified by Shiva.

Smearing of the holy Bhasma or ash by a person, whether he is a brahmacharya, grihastha, vanaprastha or sannyasa frees him from sins, makes him aware of the essence of the Vedas, gets him the benefit of bathing in holy rivers, and frees him from samsara.

== Bibliography ==
- Sastri, AM (1950). The Śaiva-Upanishads with the commentary of Sri Upanishad-Brahma-Yogin. The Adyar Library, Madras. ISBN 81-85141029. OCLC 863321204.
- Hattangadi, Sunder (2000). "जाबाल्युपनिषत् (Jabali Upanishad)" (PDF) (in Sanskrit).
- Kramrisch, Stella (1981). The Presence of Śiva. Princeton, New Jersey: Princeton University Press. ISBN 978-8120804913.
- Deussen, Paul (1997). Sixty Upanishads of the Veda. Motilal Banarsidass. ISBN 978-81-208-1467-7.
- Tinoco, Carlos Alberto (1997). Upanishads. IBRASA. ISBN 978-85-348-0040-2.
