= Savitri Upanishad =

Minor Upanishad of Hinduism

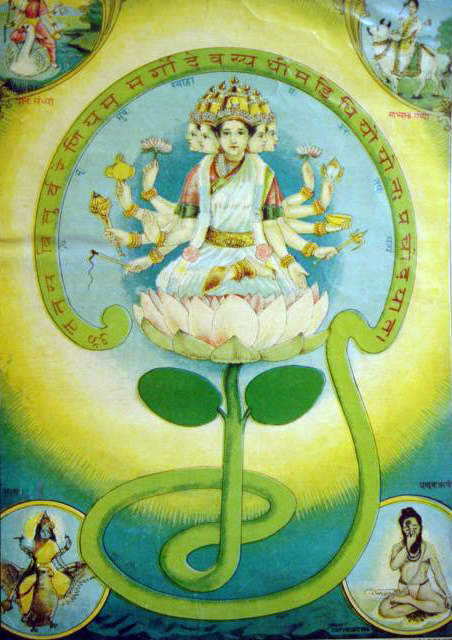
- The text presents Savitr and Savitri as the source of all universe
- Devanagari: सावित्री
- IAST: Sāvitrī
- Title means: Ray of light, sunlight
- Linked Veda: Samaveda
- Verses: 15

The Savitri Upanishad (Sanskrit: सावित्री उपनिषत्), or Savitryupanishad, is a Sanskrit text and one of the minor Upanishads of Hinduism. It is attached to the Samaveda, and one of the Samanya Upanishads. The text title is related to the Hindu Sun god.

The Upanishad describes the Savitri-vidya (knowledge of sunlight), asserting that everything in the universe is a manifestation of the masculine Savitr and feminine Savitri, elaborating on the Gayatri Mantra. The text also presents the Advaitic notion of nondual Brahman, as well as two mantras called the Bala (Strength) and Atibala (Super Strength) to meditate on Virat Purusha and Om.

== History ==
Neither the author nor the century in which Savitri Upanishad was composed are known. Manuscripts of this text are also found titled as Svaitryupanisad. In the Telugu language anthology of 108 Upanishads of the Muktika canon, narrated by Rama to Hanuman, it is listed at number 75.

== Contents ==
The Savitri Upanishad is a short text with 15 verses.

The text opens with two questions, "who is the Savitr? what is the Savitri?" Thereafter, it answers these question first with examples, wherein nine masculine-feminine pairs exemplify the nature of Savitr-Savitri, as tabulated.

| | Savitar | Savitri |
|---|---|---|
| 1 | Agni (fire) | Prithvi (earth) |
| 2 | Varuna (water) | Ap (water) |
| 3 | Vayu (air) | Akasha (sky) |
| 4 | Yajna (fire-offering) | Chandas (poem meter) |
| 5 | Stanayitnu (thunder cloud) | Vidyut (Lightning) |
| 6 | Aditya (Sun) | Dyo (celestial space) |
| 7 | Chandra (Moon) | Nakshatra (constellation) |
| 8 | Manas (mind) | Vac (speech) |
| 9 | Purusha (Man) | Stri (Woman) |

The Savitri Upanishad asserts that the fire (masculine) is the creative energy, earth (feminine) is the fuel and matter, they always manifest together, interdependent and their mithuna (mating) is the regenerative source. The wind – he is the creative energy, waters – she is the fuel and matter, they manifest together like Savitr and Savitri, are interdependent and their mithuna (mating) is a generative source, states the text. The air – when he manifests, space (ether) – she manifests, they are always together, are interdependent and their mithuna (mating) is a generative source. The Yajna (fire sacrifice) – where he is, Chandas (metered hymns) – she is, they are always together, are interdependent and their mithuna (mating) is a generative source, they are again Savitr and Savitri, asserts the text.

The thunder clouds – when he manifests as the creative energy, lightning – she manifests as fuel and expression, they are always together, are interdependent and their mithuna (mating) is a generative source. The Sun – where he is, celestial space – she is, respectively Savitr and Savitri, they are always together, are interdependent and their mithuna (mating) is a generative source, asserts the text.

The moon – when he manifests, constellations – she manifests as fuel and expression, they are always together, are interdependent and their mithuna (mating) is a generative source. The mind – where he is, speech – she is, respectively as Savitr and Savitri, they are always together, are interdependent and their mithuna (mating) is a generative source, states the text. Man – where he is, woman – she is, respectively as Savitr and Savitri, they are always together, are interdependent and their mithuna (mating) is a generative source, states the Savitri Upanishad.

The verses 10-12 of the text link the pairing to the Gayatri mantra. The first three of the above male-female relationships, states the Upanishad, are part of Bhur (earth), the middle three are part of Bhuvar (middle regions, atmosphere), and the last three are Svar (the celestial space). They together produce the phenomenal world, they are one, as Atman and Brahman are identical. This is the Savitri-vidya, states verse 13 of the text.

There are two mantras to meditate, called Bala (literally, strong) and Ati-bala (very strong), claims the text. These mantras were visualized by Rishis, asserts the text, their poetic meter is Gayatri, and they consist of "A", "U" and "M" of Om. The "A-U-M" are the Bija, Shakti and Kilaka respectively of the mantra. The text adds that the subtle part of the Om mantra has six limbs of goddess Savitri, with Klam, Klim, Klum, Klaim, Klaum and Klah. The goddess must be meditated upon, because she inspires and bestows four aims of human existence, states the Upanishad, which are Dharma, Artha, Kama and Moksha. Meditating on Savitri-vidya helps one attain co-residence with the Savitri, a state of bliss, asserts the text.

== See also ==
- Atma Upanishad
- Nirvana Upanishad
- Tripura Upanishad
