= Surya Upanishad =

Minor Upanishad of Hinduism

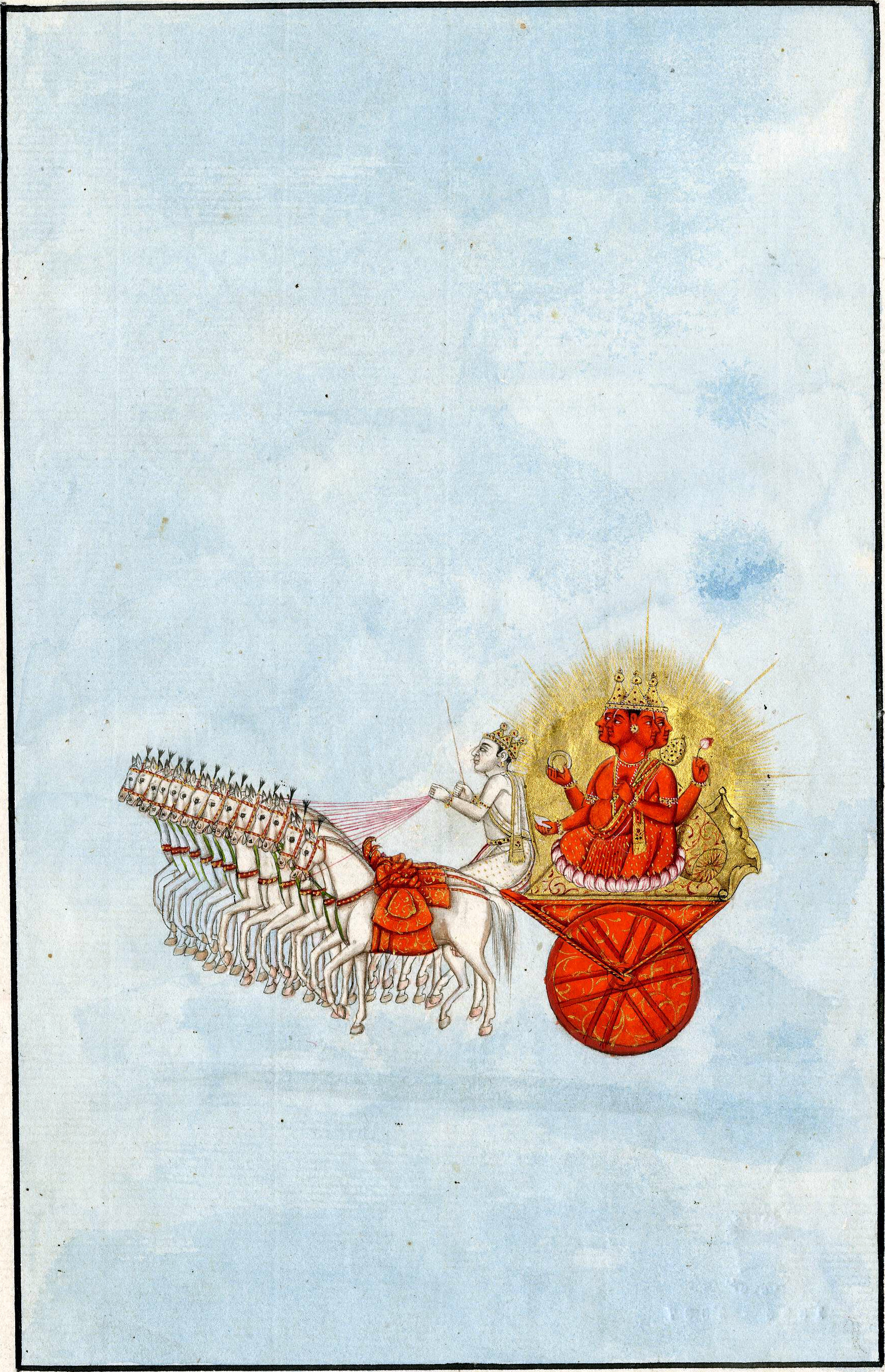
- 19th century watercolour painting of the sun god Surya, depicted riding his chariot
- Devanagari: सूर्य
- IAST: Sūrya
- Title means: Upanishad of the sun god
- Type: Samanya
- Linked Veda: Atharvaveda

The Surya Upanishad (Sanskrit: सूर्य उपनिषत्), or Suryopanishad, is one of the minor Upanishads of Hinduism, written in Sanskrit language. It is among the 31 Upanishads associated with the Atharvaveda, and one of the Samanya Upanishads.

In this Upanishad, Atharvangiras to whom the Atharvaveda is attributed, extols the virtues of Surya, the Sun god, calling him the ultimate truth and reality Brahman. Surya, asserts the text, is the creator, protector, and destroyer of the universe, and the Sun god is identical to one's Atman (soul, self).

== History ==
The author and the century in which Surya Upanishad was composed are unknown. Manuscripts of this text are also found titled as Suryopanisad (Sanskrit: सुर्योपनिषत्). In the Telugu language anthology of 108 Upanishads of the Muktika canon, narrated by Rama to Hanuman, it is listed at number 71.

== Contents ==
The Surya Upanishad opens stating that its objective is to explain and state the Atharvaveda mantra for the Sun. Brahma is the source of the Surya mantra, asserts the text, its poetic meter is Gayatri, its god is Aditya (sun), it is Hamsas so’ham – literally, "I am he" – with Agni (fire), and Narayana (Vishnu) is the Bija (seed) of this mantra. This mantra aims to remind and help win the reciter of the four worthy human goals – Dharma (ethics, duties to self and others, righteousness), Artha (prosperity, wealth, means of life), Kama (pleasure, emotions, love) and Moksha (liberation, freedom, spiritual values).

Surya

From the Sun arise all beings.
The Sun sustains them all.
Into the Sun they all vanish.
What the Sun is,
that I am.

—Surya Upanishad

The Surya, asserts the text, is same as Narayana, and he sits in a golden chariot pulled by seven horses, driving the wheel of time, bringing the promise of prosperity and the refuge from darkness. The text then references and quotes the hymn 3.62.10 of Rigveda, the Gayatri mantra, namely, "Om, earth, atmosphere and sky, we meditate on the resplendent splendor of the Sun, may he inspire our thoughts".

The Sun is the Atman (soul) of the world, it is that which moves and does not move, it is the creator of living beings, it is the source of fuel to yajna, it is the source of rains, food and drinks, states the Upanishad. Sun is the manifested form of the ultimate truth and reality Brahman, asserts the text, identical to Brahma, Vishnu and Rudra, of all the knowledge in Rigveda, Yajurveda, Samaveda and Atharvaveda.

The Upanishad states that it is the Sun that gave birth to Vayu (air), Bhumi (earth), Apas (water), Jyoti, Tejas (light, fire), sky, directions, Devas and the Vedas. Sun warms the earth, Sun is the Brahman, states the text.

Aditya, asserts the text, is another form of the antahkarana (inner organs of the body), the mind, the "intellect", the ego, the Prana (life force), the Apana, the Samana, the Vyana and the Udhana. Sun is the manifested principle behind all the five sense organs and the five motor organs in living beings, states Surya Upanishad.

Anandamayo (bliss), Jnanamayo (knowledge) and Vijnanamayo (wisdom) is Sun, states the text. He shines, he protects, asserts the Surya Upanishad, he energizes the birth of all creatures, unto him do all creatures return ultimately, to him I salute. I am Surya himself, and divine Savitir is my eye. May his knowledge inspire us, may his omnipresence guide us and protect us.

The Om is Brahman, state the closing verses of the Upanishad, and it is of single syllable. Ghrini and Surya are two syllables, while Aditya is three syllables. Together they make the eight syllable Atharvaangiras Surya mantra, asserts the text. The closing lines of the text assert that a person should study and recite this text thrice, at sunrise, at midday and at sunset, thereby he overcomes his sins, learns what is important in the Vedas and overcomes samsara.
