= Dakshinamurti Upanishad =

Minor Upanishad of Hinduism

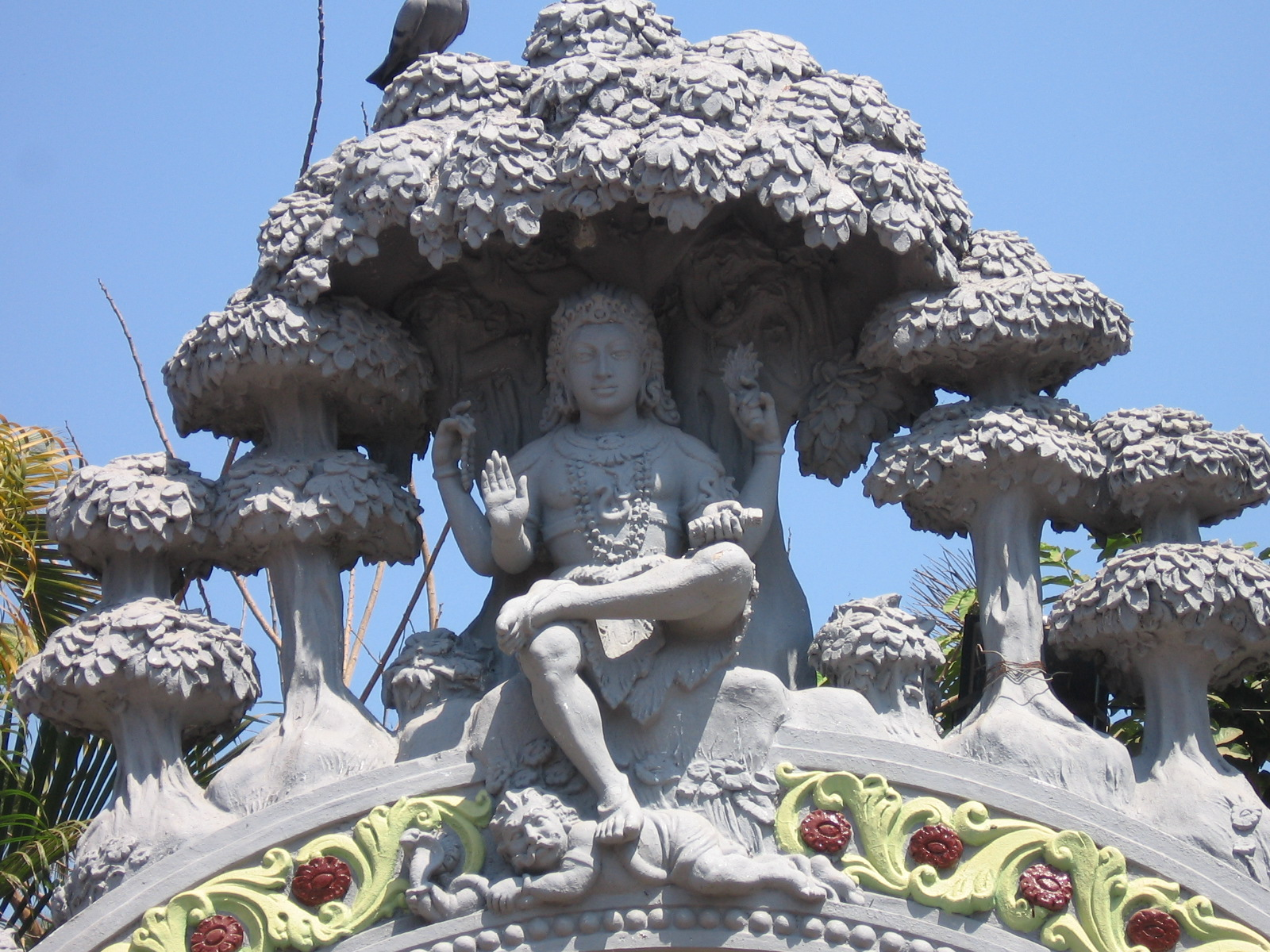
- The text discusses Shiva, as Dakshinamurti.
- Devanagari: दक्षिणामूर्ति
- IAST: Dakṣiṇāmūrti
- Title means: Giver of true knowledge
- Type: Shaiva
- Linked Veda: Krishna Yajurveda
- Philosophy: Vedanta

The Dakshinamurti Upanishad (Sanskrit: दक्षिणामूर्ति उपनिषत्, IAST: Dakṣiṇāmūrti Upaniṣad) is an ancient Sanskrit text and is one of the minor Upanishads of Hinduism. It is attached to the Krishna Yajurveda, and classified as one of the 14 Shaiva Upanishads.

The text is notable for asserting that Dakshinamurti is an aspect of Shiva, an aid to the liberating knowledge that Shiva is within oneself as Atman (self, soul), and everything one does in daily life is an offering to this Shiva.

== Name ==
The text is named after Jnana (knowledge) aspect of the Hindu god Shiva, as Dakshinamurti which means giver of knowledge. He is traditionally the expounder of the Shastras, represented as seating under a Banyan tree in the Himalayas resplendent with energy and bliss, surrounded and revered by sages, in a yoga pose (virasana), holding the fire of knowledge in one hand and a book or snake or lotus or nilotpala flower in another. Dakshinamurti is the "teacher-god", with Atma-vidya, literally the knowledge of Atman (soul, self). He is the ancient guru, who teaches One Self through silence.

The term Upanishad means it is knowledge or "hidden doctrine" text that belongs to the corpus of Vedanta literature collection presenting the philosophical concepts of Hinduism and considered the highest purpose of its scripture, the Vedas.

== History ==
In the Telugu language anthology of 108 Upanishads of the Muktika canon, narrated by Rama to Hanuman, it is listed as Dakṣiṇāmūrti Upaniṣad at number 49.

The manuscripts of the text are sometimes titled as Dakṣiṇāmūrtyupaniṣad.

== Contents ==
Markandeya's bliss

Sages asked Markandeya,
"How do you enjoy such bliss?"
Markandeya answered,
"By knowledge of the highest secret,
of Shiva,
the Reality."

—Dakshinamurti Upanishad Prelude,

The Upanishad is structured as a single chapter with 20 verses. The text opens with a prelude, wherein Vedic sages including Sanaka approach sage Markandeya, with firewood in hand, (Note: In ancient and medieval Hindu gurukul system, a student or students approached a teacher for admission to his school with firewood, implying that they are willing to work and assist in school chores if admitted to the school.) and ask him, "how are you so blissful, what is the secret behind your long content life?" Markandeya answers that it is the knowledge of the secret of Shiva, which is knowing the Reality. The sages ask back, what is this Reality? what is the means to it, what is the aid to that knowledge, who is the deity, what offerings, how should one devote oneself to it, at what time and how?

Shiva is the Dakshinamukha, states the text through Markandeya, he as deity is the aid, he is the one into whom the universe will dissolve and into whom all will be absorbed back, he is who shines, he is inherently blissful and happy because he knows his true nature.

After the prelude, the first three verses of the text describes the iconography of Dakshinamurti, as being of silver color, moon crested near his hair, seated in yoga posture, holding in his various hands a rosary, a vessel of amrita (nectar of eternal life), a book symbolizing knowledge, the Shiva serpent, his forehead and body marked with holy ash, with axe, deer and sages surrounding him, as he sits under a banyan-fig tree.

The verse 4 of the text represents his alternate iconography as holding a vina (musical instrument). Dakshinamurti, asserts verse 5 of the text, is the essential meaning of the Vedas.

True devotion, defines the Upanishad, is to meditate before Dakshinamurti, with the constant thought of "I am He", that is "I am identical with Shiva". The means to secret knowledge of Shiva, states the text, is to concentrate and realize that Shiva is no different than oneself, that all bodily human action, in one's life, is an offering to Shiva. The best time to worship this Reality, asserts the text, is in all three states of consciousness – during action when one is awake, during rest when one is dreaming in sleep, and in the state of deep sleep.

The gathered sages, states the text, then ask Markadeya for the form and manifestation of Shiva, and who should be the worshipper? The worshipper, asserts the text, is one who seeks the lamp of wisdom, within whom is the oil of indifference to that which is the worldly superficiality, who has the wick of devotion for the light of knowledge. Once the darkness within is dispelled, Shiva becomes manifested in the worshipper, states the Upanishad. Shiva, asserts the text, then dwells in the devotee as his Self, the bliss, the wisdom, and he is free of all notions of duality.

This is the secret doctrine of Shiva, the Reality. He who studies it, is delivered from all sins, and is the one who attains kaivalya, asserts the text.
