= Rudrahridaya Upanishad =

Minor Upanishad of Hinduism

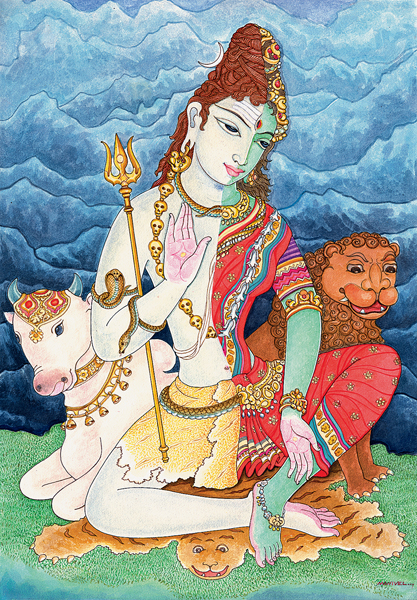
- The text describes Rudra and Uma are inseparable half and ever present
- Devanagari: रुद्रहृद्य
- IAST: Rudrahṛdaya
- Title means: The heart of Rudra
- Type: Shaiva
- Linked Veda: Krishna Yajurveda
- Chapters: 1
- Verses: 52
- Philosophy: Shaivism

The Rudrahridaya Upanishad (Sanskrit: रुद्रहृद्य उपनिषत्, IAST: Rudrahṛdaya Upaniṣad) is a medieval era Sanskrit text and is one of the minor Upanishads of Hinduism. The text is attached to the Krishna Yajurveda and classified under one of the 14 Shaiva Upanishads.

The Upanishad states that Rudra and Uma are the ultimate reality Brahman. The Upanishad glorifies Shiva and Uma as inseparable, asserts that they together manifest as all gods and goddesses, all animate and inanimate reality of the universe. This text, like other Shaiva Upanishads, is presented with Vedanta nondualism terminology, and states that the individual Atman (soul) is identical with the supreme reality Brahman.

== History ==
The date or author of Rudrahridaya Upanishad is unknown. Manuscripts of this text are also found titled as Hridaya Upanishad, or Rudrahrdayopanisad. In the Telugu language anthology of 108 Upanishads of the Muktika canon, narrated by Rama to Hanuman, it is listed at number 85.

== Contents ==
The text opens by asserting that all Devas are manifestations of Rudra (Shiva), and all Devis are manifestations of Uma (Parvati). They are inseparable, in forever union.

Those who love Shiva, love Vishnu; those who hate Shiva, hate Vishnu asserts the text. Those who worship Shiva, are worshipping Vishnu. Rudra is full of Vishnu and Brahma. Uma is same as Vishnu. The masculine is Shiva, asserts the text, and the feminine is Bhavani (Uma). What moves in the universe, is just Rudra-Uma manifestation, and what does not move in the universe is also just Rudra-Uma manifestation, states the text. Dharma is Rudra, world is Vishnu, knowledge is Brahma, all is inseparable.

Rudra and Uma

Rudra is man, Uma is woman.
Rudra is Brahma, Uma is Sarasvati.
Rudra is Vishnu, Uma is Lakshmi.
Rudra is the Sun, Uma is shadow.
Rudra is the Moon, Uma is star.
Rudra is day, Uma is night.
Rudra is Yajna, Uma is Vedi.
Rudra is Agni, Uma is Svaha.
Rudra is Veda, Uma is Shastra.
Rudra is scent, Uma is flower.
Rudra is meaning, Uma is word.
Prostrations to Him and Her.

— Rudrahridaya Upanishad 17-22, (Abridged)

The text, states Shakya, is the only Upanishad that presents the composite merged form of Rudra-Uma as all truth and reality, and emphasizes this hermaphrodite-style union aspect by presenting the unison in other combinations such as Brahma-Vani and Vishnu-Lakshmi.

The later part of the Rudrahridaya Upanishad presents the Advaita theory of nonduality, by presenting threefold character of Atman. The text states that the absolute truth is "nirguna (without attributes, abstract), nirakara (without shape), with sensory organs, omnipresent, impersonal, imperishable" and identical to the soul within oneself and each living being. Everything is god, and god is in everything, asserts the text. All reality is the same Shiva and one absolute, which is identical to Om, the Atman, the satcitananda (existence-consciousness-bliss).

== See also ==
- Atharvashiras Upanishad
- Narayana Upanishad
- Nirvana Upanishad
- Tripura Upanishad
