= Skanda Upanishad =

Hindu text

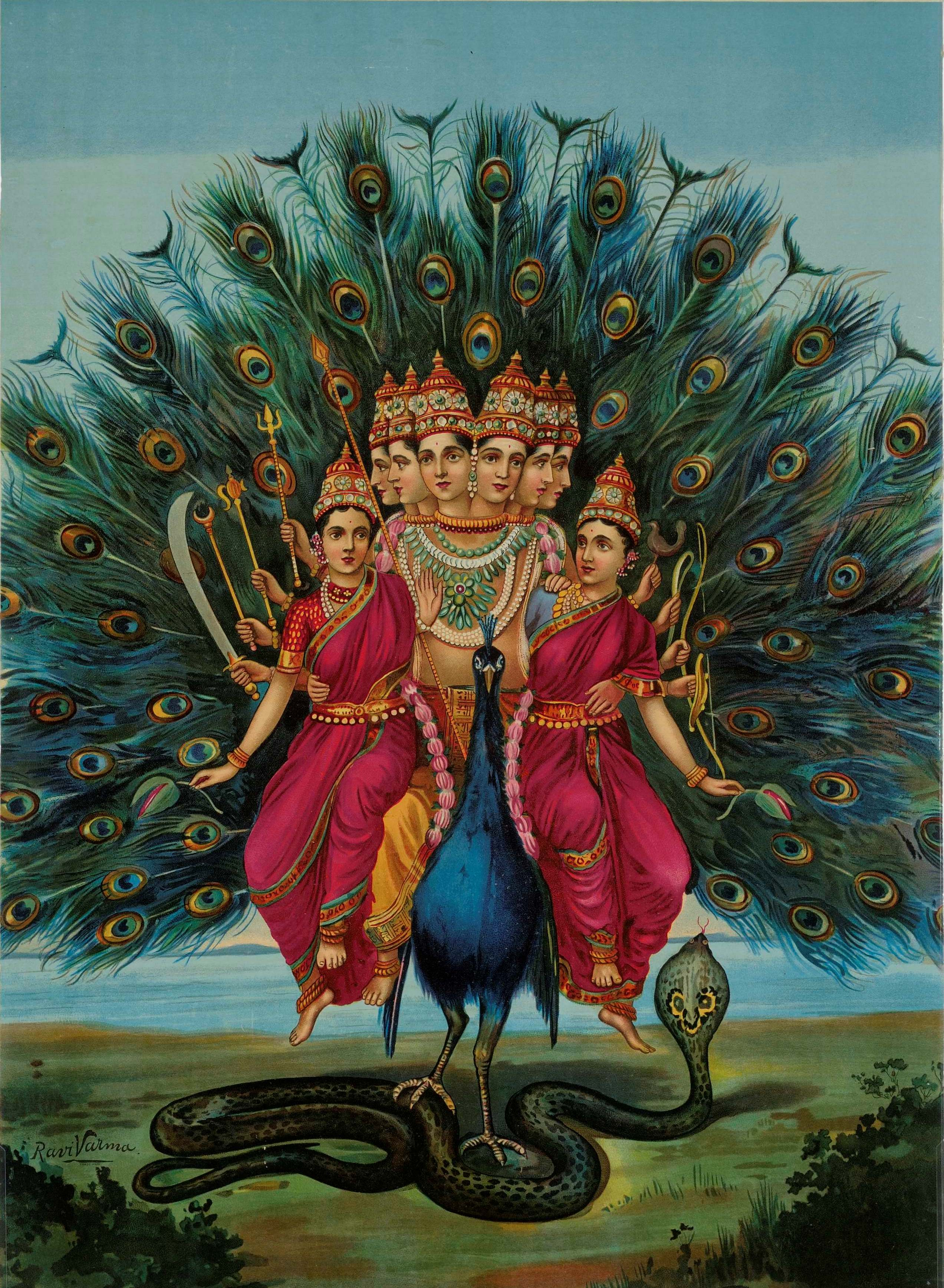
- The god Skanda also known as Murugan, Kartikeya states all gods and Atman are the same.
- Devanagari: स्कंद
- IAST: Skānda
- Title means: The god Kartikeya (Skanda)
- Type: Samanya
- Linked Veda: Krishna Yajurveda
- Verses: 15
- Philosophy: Vedanta

Skanda Upanishad or Skandopanishad (Sanskrit: स्कंदोपनिषद्) is one of the 108 Upanishads of Hinduism, written in Sanskrit. It is classified as a Samanya (general) Upanishad and is associated with the Krishna Yajurveda, one of the 32 listed Upanishads under it.

The Upanishad is told in first person by Kartikeya (Skanda), the Hindu god of war and the son of Shiva. While the Upanishad states that Skanda is the ultimate reality called Brahman, he is also described as consciousness, Atman (soul, self), and Shiva as well by the text.

The text emphasizes there is no difference between Vishnu and Shiva – the gods of Vaishnavism and Shaivism respectively, that they are one, as are all gods. The ideal worship, states the Upanishad, is to see one's innermost self as not different from Skanda, Shiva, Vishnu and Brahman.

== History ==
The author and the date of composition of Skanda Upanishad are not known. Manuscripts of this text are also found titled as Aksyupanisad. It is listed at number 51 in the Telugu language anthology of 108 Upanishads of the Muktika canon, narrated by Rama to Hanuman.

== Contents ==
The Skanda Upanishad is written in the voice of Kartikeya (Skanda), the Hindu god of war and the son of Shiva. The Upanishad is narrated in 15 shlokas or verses. Skanda addresses his father Shiva as the Great God (Mahadeva) and says that he is a superior being due to Shiva's grace. He declares himself as vijnana (knowledge) and Shiva himself. Internal organs conceal the Truth and after their destruction, the god Vishnu emerges from the Samvit (Consciousness or knowledge). Skanda declares himself as the Unborn one and part of the Samvit. All inert things, except the Atman (soul), are destroyers. The "imperishable" (Achyuta, a name of Vishnu) who discerns between consciousness and inertness is identified with jnana (knowledge), Shiva, Vishnu, Parameshvara (the Supreme God), the Light of Lights and Supreme Brahman (Absolute Reality). Skanda declares he is that Brahman. He says that he is indestructible.

Skanda says that jiva (a living being) is Shiva. Just as before husking, it is paddy and after husking, a grain is rice, similarly bound by karma, it is a jiva and when liberated from karma, it becomes Shiva. Skanda then pays his respects to Shiva, who is a form of Vishnu and Vishnu, who is a form of Shiva. Further, Vishnu is said to dwell in the heart of Shiva and vice versa. Shiva and Vishnu are the one and the same.

The Skanda Upanishad further compares the body to the temple and the jiva (life-force) to Shiva. Like old flower offerings are cast away from the temple, ajnana (ignorance, absence of jnana) should be thrown out from the body. God be worshipped by the thought that one is same as Him, which is jnana. Dhyana (meditation) should be to rid the mind of objects. Bathing is removing the dirt in the mind. Cleanliness is control over the senses. One must consume the drink of Brahman. One must live on alms and in a solitary place alone and realize the non-duality of the Soul and Brahman. Thus, one attains emancipation (moksha).

A prayer in first person follows. Obeisance is offered to the Supreme Light, wishing for prosperity and longevity. Vishnu as Narasimha and Shiva as Mahadeva are addressed. The hymn declares that by their grace, people realize the incomprehensible Brahman, which transcends thoughts, is unmanifest and infinite and indestructible, but takes the form of the deities, Brahma, Vishnu and Shiva.

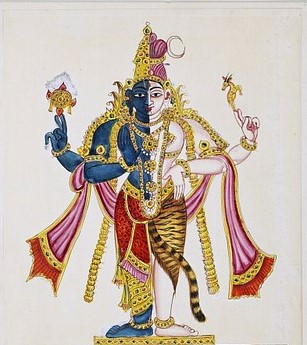
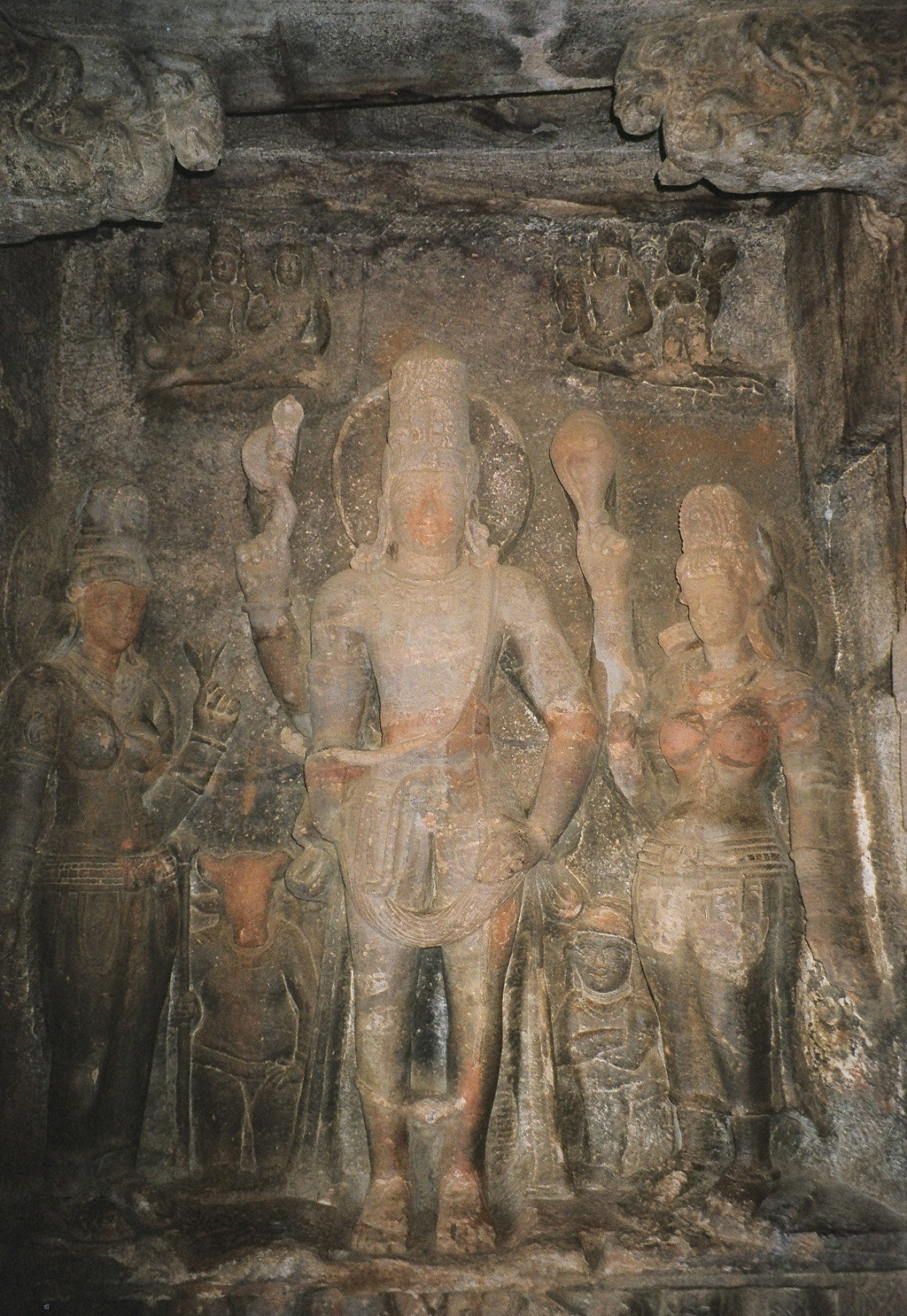
Left: Harihara, depicting Vishnu and Shiva as one.
Right: 6th-century Harihara carving in Cave 3 of Badami cave temples.

The Skanda Upanishad ends with the hymn:

And the highest step of Vishnu
The patrons see for ever
Like an eye, stationed in heaven.
And wondering over this highest step
Of Vishnu, the priests, wide-awake,
Enkindle the sacrificial fire.

This hymn originates from the Rig Veda and appears in other Upanishadic texts like Aruneya Upanishad, Nrisimha Tapaniya Upanishad, Vasudeva Upanishad and Muktika Upanishad.

== Commentary ==
Two aphorisms from the Skanda Upanishad: "Shiva is Jiva" and "the body is said to be the temple" are quoted repeatedly. Aurobindo interprets them to convey that the unmanifested soul within a person should be united with Shiva, that is, Brahman.

The unity and sameness of Vishnu and Shiva, gods of the rival Hindu sects of Vaishnavism and Shaivism respectively, in the text are also emphasized. This identification of the two gods is said an attempt of syncretism of the warring sects, similar to the icon of Harihara, the combined form of Vishnu and Shiva.
