= Mudgala Upanishad =

Hindu Vaishnava text

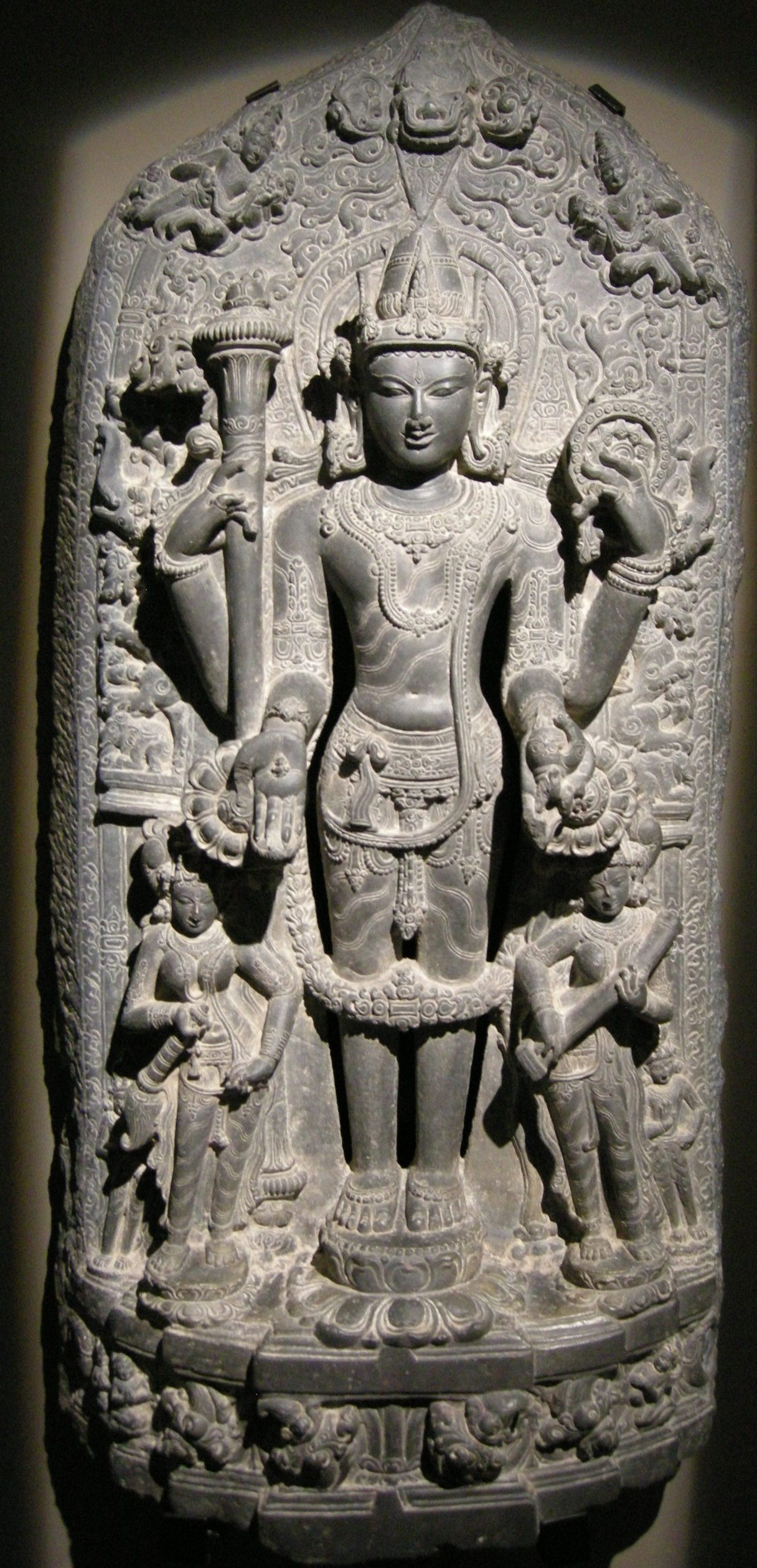
- The text states Vishnu is the primordial, metaphysical reality and the individual soul
- Devanagari: मुद्गल
- IAST: Mudgala
- Title means: named after a Vedic sage
- Type: Samanya
- Linked Veda: Rigveda
- Chapters: 4
- Philosophy: Vaishnavism

The Mudgala Upanishad (Sanskrit: मुद्गल उपनिषत्, IAST: Mudgala Upaniṣad) is a Sanskrit text and a major Upanishad of Hinduism. It is classified as a Samanya Upanishad and attached to the Rigveda.

The Mudgala Upanishad, along with Subala Upanishad, is one of the two Upanishads that discuss the Purusha Sukta of Rigveda. It is notable for asserting that Narayana (Vishnu) is the Brahman (Highest reality, Supreme being), that he created the universe from a fourth part of himself, then became himself the Atman (soul) in individual living beings.

The text asserts that Narayana is Moksha (liberation), representing the state of union between the Atman and the Brahman. The text is notable in that it presents only the first nine verses of the Purusha Sukta, and the absence of last seven verses that describe the creation of living beings and varna (social classes) considered by scholars to be a later addition.

== Development ==
The author or composition date of Mudgala Upanishad is unknown. Jan Gonda – a professor of Sanskrit and Dutch Indologist, states it is a late Upanishad. The style and structure of Sanskrit words used by the text suggest it to be a medieval text. The text, states Klaus Witz, is a post-Vedic but early Vaishnava Upanishad. The Upanishad reflects an integration and a harmony of Vedic doctrines with those of Vaishnava doctrines.

The text is titled after Vedic sage Mudgala, who is credited to be the author of Rigvedic hymn 10.102, where his wife wins a metaphorical competitive race against others, despite the handicaps placed against her, because she and Mudgala held on to truth and reality during the competition, while others behaved falsely. The Vedic sage Mudgala is celebrated in the Hindu epic Mahabharata as the one who refused to go to heaven with a celestial messenger, because he prefers his meditative monk life and his human life in the state of moksha. The discussions on virtues and ethics for a happy, content life found in the Mahabharata reappear in the text of the Mudgala Upanishad.

Manuscripts of this text are also found titled as Mudgalopanisad. In the Telugu language anthology of 108 Upanishads of the Muktika canon, narrated by Rama to Hanuman, it is listed at number 57.

== Contents ==
The Mudgala Upanisad is structured into four chapters. The first part opens with nine slokas which references and presents the Purusasukta from the Rigveda chapter 10.90, stating it to be the foundation of Vaishnavism and asserting that Vishnu is the Purusha, or primordial person. The second part of the text is structured in prose form, presenting it as a discourse from Vasudeva (Vishnu) to Indra who represents the inhabitants of the universe seeking moksha (liberation). The teachings in the text, states Gonda, resonate with the main tenets found in the Hindu epics and post-epic, especially pancharatra literature.

Highest person is soul

Through yoga with these,
the Highest Person becomes,
a soul in a living being,
nothing else.

— Mudgala Upanishad
Chapter 4 (Abridged)

The text opens with the Purusha Sukta found in Rig veda hymn 10.90, but just the first nine of the sixteen verses that are found in the modern surviving version of Rigveda manuscript. The Purusha is identified to be Vishnu (Narayana, Hari). The Adi-purusha, primordial cosmic reality, is identified by the text as nothing but Brahman, who is asserted to be Vishnu, then declared as the cause of All. Vishnu's soul is the primordial sacrifice that becomes the unchanging and the evolving reality, according to the text.

The first two verses of chapter 1 of the Mudgala Upanishad assert Vishnu to be omnipresent in space and time. The text thereafter asserts that Vishnu (Hari) to be the grantor of liberation, from whom all of Prakriti and Purusha were born. Vishnu, states the text using the words of the Purusha sukta, sacrificed himself and thus became Brahman and Atman (individual soul). Thus arose the world of living beings, asserts the text.

Chapter 2 opens as a discourse of Vasudeva to Indra, wherein Vasudeva teaches Bhagavatism. Purusha Narayana is asserted by the text to be "what has been, what is, and what will be", who divided himself into four, wherein the first three remained in the heavens, and the last fourth became all of living beings include humanity, as well as non-living nature. He, that is Vishnu, is the soul within each living being (jiva), identical everywhere and with the universal soul (atman).

Chapter 3 asserts that everything is manifestation of Vishnu, from Asuras to Gandharvas, from men to gods, and regardless of how one worships him, they become him. One must seek, states the text, to realize through meditation the identity of his own I (aham iti) with Brahman.

The Upanishad in chapter 4 discusses virtues in the context of self-knowledge, and asserts that the six inner enemies of man are anger, covetousness, infatuation, conceit, desire and jealousy. The six waves of inner reminder are hunger, thirst, sorrow, craving, old age and dying, while the six embarrassments, states the text, are race, family, social class (varna), stage in life (ashrama) and favorable circumstances. One overcomes these with Yoga, asserts the text, and by meditating on one's soul, and realizing it being one with Vishnu.

== See also ==
- Atma Upanishad
- Maha Upanishad
- Nirvana Upanishad
- Sarvasara Upanishad
