= Bhavana Upanishad =

Medieval Hindu text

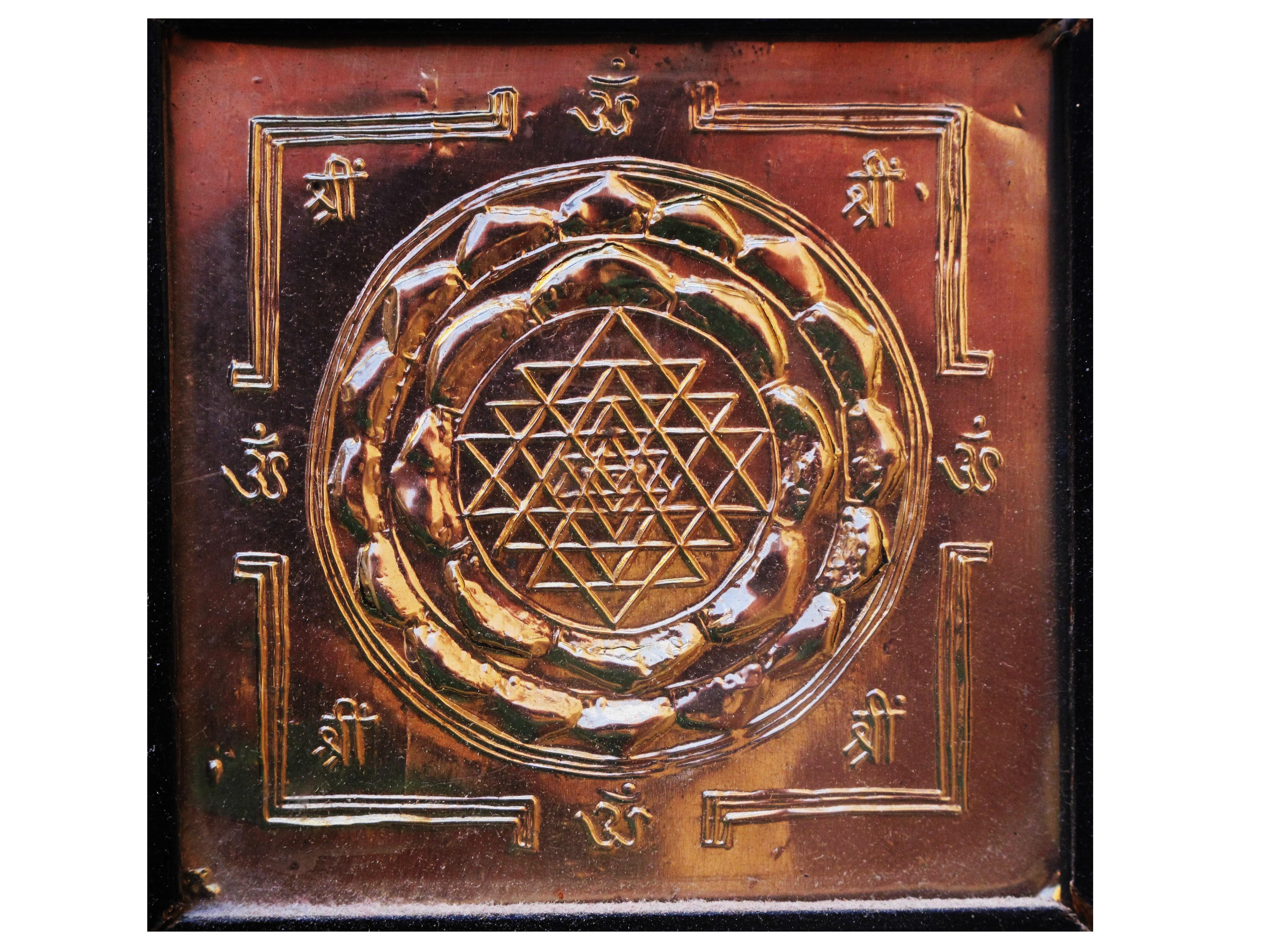
- The text discusses the human body as Srichakra yantra.
- Devanagari: भावन
- IAST: Bhāvana
- Title means: Feeling, internal visualization
- Date: ~15th-century CE
- Type: Shakta
- Linked Veda: Atharvaveda
- Chapters: 1
- Verses: 37
- Philosophy: Shaktism, Vedanta

The Bhavana Upanishad (Sanskrit: भावन उपनिषद्, IAST: Bhāvana Upaniṣad) is a medieval era minor Upanishad of Hinduism. Composed in Sanskrit, the text is classified as one of the Shakta Upanishads and attached to the Atharvaveda. The Upanishad identifies the human body as Srichakra yantra and elaborates on this theme, and its worship.

== History ==
The author and the date when Bhavana Upanishad was composed are unknown. The text was likely composed, in the same period as other Shakta Upanishads, between the 12th- and 15th-century CE. While this text is a relatively late composition in the Upanishadic collection, literary evidence confirms that Shakta Tantrism has roots in ancient times and the interaction between Vedic and Tantric traditions trace back to at least the sixth century, and the surge in Tantra tradition developments during the late medieval period, states Geoffrey Samuel, were a means to confront and cope with Islamic invasions and political instability in and after 14th-century CE in parts of India and Tibet.

The Bhavana Upanishad is a sister text to Tripura Upanishad. Both of these texts were commented on the 18th-century Tantra and Mother goddess scholar Bhaskararaya. The text has been popular in Srividya tradition of South India.

The text was translated by AG Krishna Warrier in 1967. However, scholarly reviews such as those by Brooks have questioned the translation and its conservative modern interpretation that is inconsistent with how the text was interpreted by 15th- to 18th-century Indian scholars such as Bhaskararaya in their bhasya (review and commentary). S. Mira published an English translation and study of the Bhāvanopaniṣad, along with Bhāskararāya's commentary, in 1976 through Ganesh and Company Press in Chennai.

Manuscripts of this text are also found titled as Bhavanopanisad. In the Telugu language anthology of 108 Upanishads of the Muktika canon, narrated by Rama to Hanuman, it is listed at number 84.

== Contents ==
The Upanishad describes the human body to be Sri Yantra (Sri chakra), by mapping each part of the body to the chakra. It asserts that the Shakti is the Atman (soul) within. The text is notable for its emphasis on Antaryaga (internal worship) in contrast to external rituals and offerings. The 18th-century scholar Bhaskararaya, in his commentary, explains verse 29 of the Bhavana Upanishad to be based on the premise "all love their own self".

The text presents nondualistic ideas, presenting Goddess as the supreme reality of the universe. The philosophical premises in this text as in many Shakta Upanishads, states June McDaniel, is syncretism of Samkhya and Advaita Vedanta schools of Hindu philosophy, called Shaktadavaitavada (literally, the path of nondualistic Shakti).

== See also ==
- Atharvashiras Upanishad
- Devi Upanishad
- Mahanarayana Upanishad
