= Naradaparivrajaka Upanishad =

Medieval era Sanskrit text

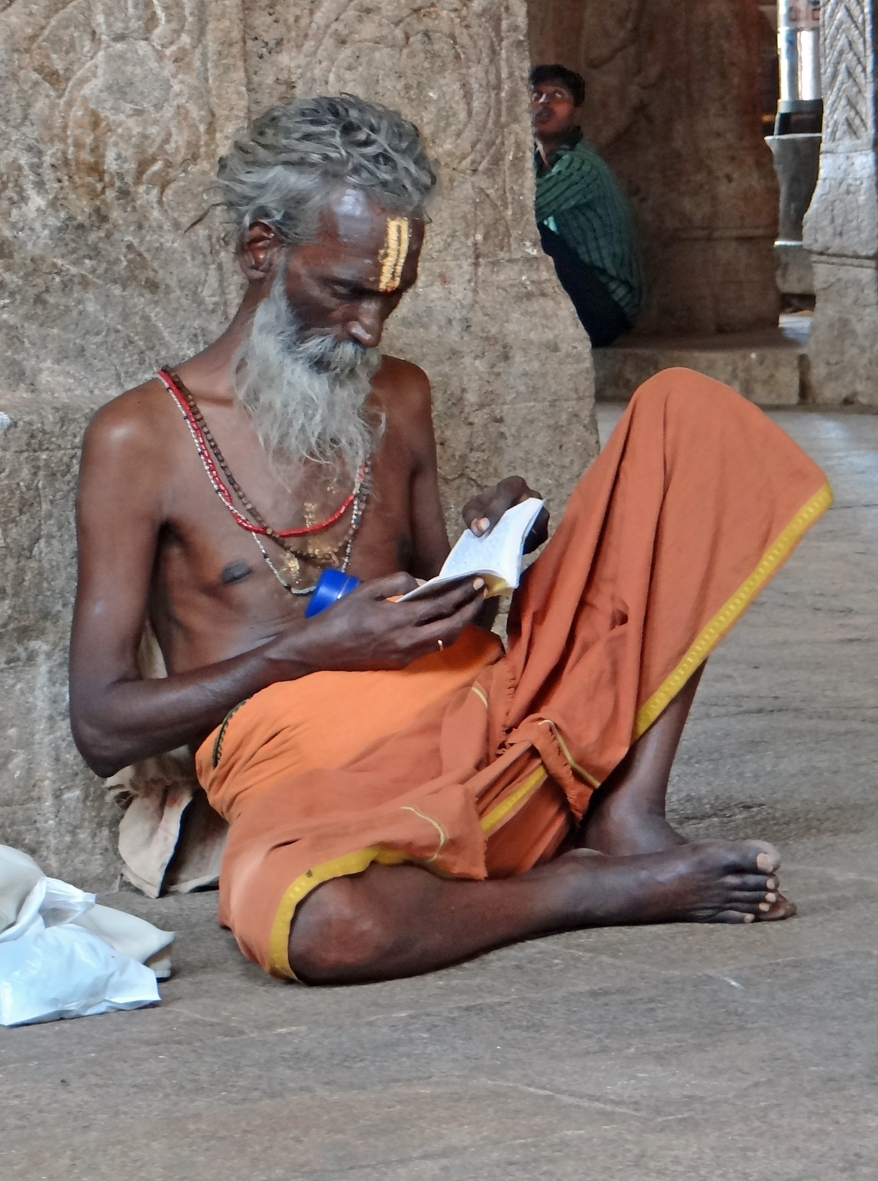
- The Naradaparivrajaka Upanishad discusses Sannyasi
- Devanagari: नारदपरिव्राजकोपनिषत्
- IAST: Nāradaparivrājaka
- Title means: Wandering Nārada
- Date: ~12th-century
- Type: Sannyasa
- Linked Veda: Atharvaveda
- Chapters: 9
- Verses: 221
- Philosophy: Vedanta

The Naradaparivrajaka Upanishad (Sanskrit: नारदपरिव्राजक उपनिषत्, IAST: Nāradaparivrājaka Upaniṣad) is a medieval era Sanskrit text and one of the minor Upanishads of Hinduism. The text is attached to the Atharva Veda, and is one of the 20 Sannyasa (renunciation) Upanishads.

The Naradaparivrajaka text describes the rites of passage associated with renunciation and the life of someone who has chosen the monastic path of life as a sannyasi in Hindu Ashrama tradition. It is significantly longer than many related Sannyasa Upanishads, states Patrick Olivelle, and resembles a "medieval legal compendia".

== History ==
The word Parivrajaka means "roaming ascetic". The title refers to the teachings of the Vedic sage Narada as a roaming sannyasi.

The century in which Naradaparivrajaka Upanishad was composed is unclear. This text was likely composed much after the Ashrama Upanishad which is itself dated to the 3rd-century CE. It refers to the Manusmriti and other Dharmasastras, and therefore is chronologically placed to a period after. Sprockhoff dates Naradaparivrajaka Upanishad to be a 12th-century text.

The Naradaparivrajaka Upanishad was translated by Ramanathan in 1978, but this translation has been reviewed as "extremely poor and inaccurate". Another translation was published by Olivelle in 1992.

This text has been sometimes titled as Naradaparivrajakopanishad in some discovered manuscripts. In the Telugu language anthology of 108 Upanishads of the Muktika canon, narrated by Rama to Hanuman, it is listed at number 43.

== Contents ==
The Upanishad, which is presented in nine chapters, opens by describing the tale of Nārada, a Vedic sage revered in numerous texts of the Hindu tradition, who deeply meditates in the Naimisha Forest mentioned in the epic Mahabharata. He is approached by other sages, and they ask him, "please tell us the way to moksha (liberation)". Nārada, asserts the text, tells them that a man should first complete the samskaraas (rites of passage in life), complete studies in Brahmacharya from a Guru (teacher) he reverentially loves for twelve years, then be a householder or Grihastha for twenty five years, be a Vanaprastha or retired forest hermit for another twenty five, then finally renounce if he has no more attachments, is calm, free from enmity against anyone. Upanishad states in chapter 8 that of the four states of ambulating, dreaming, dreamless sleep and turiya or pure consciousness, the omnipresent is part of the fourth state only.

Readiness to renounce

He becomes indifferent toward everything;
attains purity of mind;
and burns away desire, jealousy, envy and egotism;
such a man is fit to renounce.
He has lost the fear of others, and
whom others have ceased to fear.

— Naradaparivrajaka Upanishad Chapter 2

The sannyasi, states the Upanishad, is one who is attached to his soul and nothing else, he seeks and knows the highest truth, he is one with imperishable Brahman (ultimate reality), he is peaceful, tranquil, pure, truthful, content, sincere, kind, compassionate, free from anger, free from love or hate, he is without material possessions. He is rapt in contemplation, to others he may appear dumb or mad. A sannyasi lives a simple life, he never hurts any living being, he remains happy when people assault him just as much as when they honor him.

The text asserts the view also found in much older Sannyasa Upanishad, that a sannyasi does not do "social rituals, divine worship, propitiatory rites and such practices", he is beyond pilgrimages, vows, injunctions and temporal actions, states Olivelle. Verses 193–194 of the text assert that the renouncer lives in his own self, and therefore transcends all social classes and orders of life, for him no laws or restrictions or prohibitions apply.

The Naradaparivrajaka text is notable for describing the rites of passage at time of renunciation in a manner similar to those for the dying and dead, implying that the renouncer was leaving his world and the family, social and material ties that he had, and for his family and friends the rite was akin to they accepting him as deceased. The text is also notable for its description of how anyone in mortal danger may renounce, as well as describing the life of renunciation as the highest Yoga, as that of aloof self-content person who is a meditator of Brahman and Vedanta philosophy.

== See also ==
- Aruni Upanishad
- Jabala Upanishad
- Paramahamsa Upanishad
