= Hayagriva Upanishad =

Sanskrit text, part of Atharva Veda

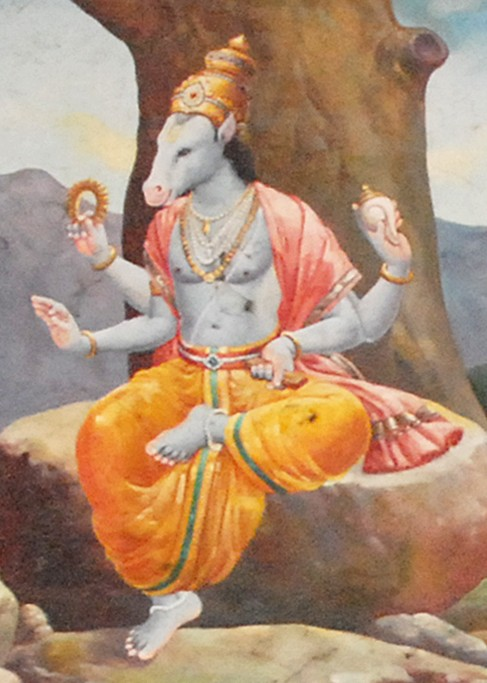
- Hayagriva
- Devanagari: हयग्रीव
- IAST: Hayagrīva
- Title means: horse-necked, one of the avatars of Vishnu
- Date: Medieval period
- Type: Vaishnava
- Linked Veda: Atharvaveda
- Chapters: 2
- Verses: 20
- Philosophy: Vaishnavism

Hayagriva Upanishad or Hayagrivopanishad (Sanskrit: हयग्रीव उपनिषद्) is one of 108 Upanishad, written in Sanskrit language. It is a minor Upanishad, dedicated to Hayagriva – the horse-faced avatar of the god Vishnu. It belongs to the Vaishnava sect, which worships Vishnu, and is associated with the Atharvaveda.

In a Telugu language anthology of 108 Upanishads of the Muktika in the modern era, narrated by Rama to Hanuman, it is listed at number 100. The Upanishad is neither part of the anthology of 52 popular Upanishads in north India by Colebrooke, nor is it found in the Bibliotheca Indica anthology of popular Upanishads in south India by Narayana.

The Hayagriva Upanishad presents mantras to know the nature of the supreme reality Brahman.

== Date ==
The composition date of the text is unknown. Given the Vishnu avatar-oriented sectarian nature, and the description of tantric mantras in the text, it is likely a relatively late Upanishad. Sectarian Upanishads with tantra mantras were likely composed after the 10th century, states Douglas Brooks. Patrick Olivelle states that sectarian Upanishads attached to Atharvaveda were likely composed in the 2nd-millennium, until about the 16th century.

== Name ==
The word Hayagriva means "horse necked". The term also refers to several different mythological characters found in all three major ancient Indic religions – Hinduism, Buddhism and Jainism.

Hayagriva refers to a horse-themed avatar, also known as Ashvamukha, Ashvasirsa and Hayashirsa. In one legend, Hayagriva is the persistent horse who brought back the Vedas from asuras Madhu and Kaitabha who stole them, during the mythical battle between good and evil – a battle described in the Mahabharata. In an alternate mythology, Hayagriva refers to a demon who stole the Vedas and was slain by Vishnu in his Matsya (fish) avatar, a story presented in the Bhagavata Purana. In a third version, a mythology presented in medieval era Devi-Bhagavata Purana, Vishnu appears in a hybrid human-body, horse-headed form called Hiyagriva who battles and kills a horse-like demon also named Hiyagriva. Finally, in Pancaratra Vaishnava tradition, Hayagriva-Vishnu becomes the god of learning and one who protects, maintains the Vedas. In the Hayagriva Upanishad, the term refers to half-human horse-headed Vishnu avatar who is the teacher of humanity.

== Content ==
The Hayagriva Upanishad has 20 verses and is divided into two chapters. It is narrated as a sermon by the god Brahma to sage Narada. The text opens with an invocation to the god Vishnu, Indra, Garuda, the Sun, and Brihaspati are also invoked for welfare of all.

Narada asks Brahma to grant him the knowledge of Brahman, which saves one from sins and grants spiritual and material wealth. Brahma declares that one who "masters" the mantras of Hayagriva learns the wisdom of the scriptures Shrutis ("heard knowledge"), Smritis (memorized knowledge), Itihasas (Hindu epics, literally "history"), and Puranas and is bestowed with wealth. Brahma then starts narrating the various mantras that are used in Hayagriva's worship.

The first mantra salutes Hayagriva as Vishnu, the ruler of knowledge. He is praised beyond the material universe and as a saviour. The second mantra identifies Hayagriva as the manifestation of the three Vedas — Rigveda, Yajurveda and Samaveda — and Om. He is, asserts the text, the symbol of all Vedas, the teacher of everything. Hayagriva is described to be radiant like the moon and holds a shankha (conch), chakra (discus) and a book in his three hands, while the fourth makes the maha-mudra hand gesture. The 29-syllabled mantra (Om srim hlaum om namo bhagavate hayagrivaya vishnave mahyam medham prajnam prayaccha svaha) and 28-syllable mantra (Om srim hrim aim aim aim klim klim sauh sauh hrim om namo bhagavate hayagrivaya mahyam medham prajnam prayaccha svaha) are then told, ending the first chapter.

The second chapter begins with Brahma telling about the one-syllable mantra (bija) of Hayagriva: Lhoum. The mantra Amritam kuru kuru svaha, asserts the text, grants control over words, wealth and the eight siddhis. Another mantra Lhoum sakala-samrajyena siddhim kuru kuru svaha through which, claims the text, in life the reciter gains pleasures and after death, salvation. This helps one realize the true spiritual meanings of the Vedic maxims (Mahavakya):

- Prajnanam Brahma (Brahman is wisdom),
- Tat tvam asi (You are that)",
- Ayam atma brahma (My soul is Brahman),
- Aham Brahmasmi (I am Brahman).

Four supplementary Vedic mantras are then recited, which are "Yad Vak Vadanthi ...", "Gowrimimaya...", "Oshtapidhana ..." and "Sa Sarpareeramathim ...".

In tradition of Upanishads, the Hayagriva Upanishad ends by mentioning the merits of the text. The canon declares that one who recites the Hayagriva Upanishad on ekadashi (11th lunar day, which is sacred to Vishnu) would be blessed with Hayagriva's grace and attain salvation. The text ends with a prayer that this knowledge of the Brahman may remain with the devotee.

== See also ==
- Ganapati Upanishad
- Mahanarayana Upanishad
- Nirvana Upanishad
- Varaha Upanishad
