= Shukarahasya Upanishad =

Minor Upanishad of Hinduism

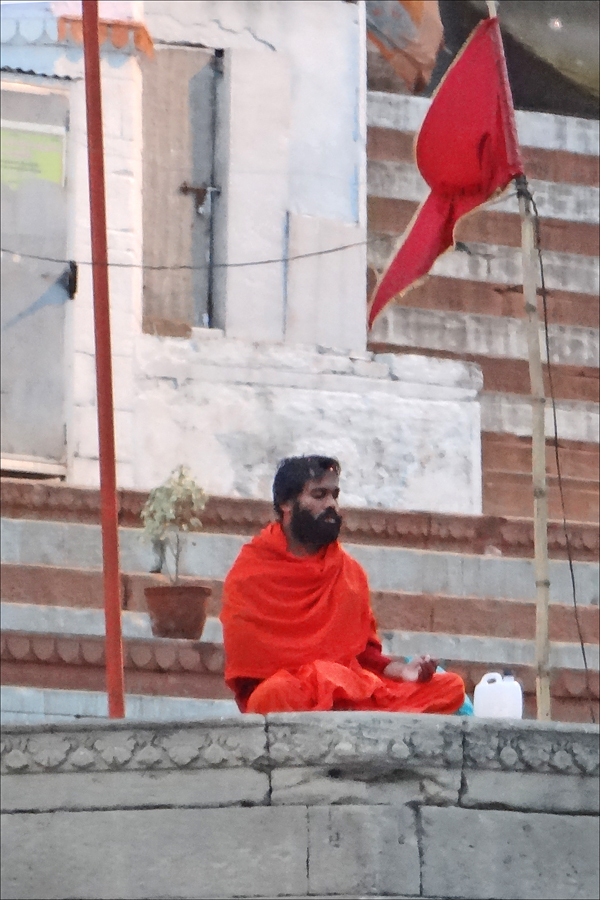
- The Upanishad discusses meditation for spiritual liberation
- Devanagari: शुकरहस्य
- IAST: Śukarahasya
- Title means: Mystery of Shuka (sage Vyasa's son)
- Type: Samanya (general)
- Linked Veda: Krishna Yajurveda
- Chapters: 6
- Philosophy: Vedanta

The Shukarahasya Upanishad (Sanskrit: शुकरहस्य उपनिषद्, IAST: Śukarahasya Upaniṣad), also called Rahasya Upanishad, is a Sanskrit text and one of the minor Upanishads of Hinduism. It is classified under one of the 21 Samanya Upanishads and attached to the Krishna Yajurveda.

The text is a mix of prose and verses. It asserts that it has six parts and is structured as a discourse between Shiva and Shuka – the son of Vedic sage Vyasa. Shukha is celebrated in Hinduism as the one who became a sannyasi (Hindu monk) at a very young age.

The text is notable for extracting and describing four Mahavakyas, or sacred statements one each from the ancient layers within the four Vedas, and presenting them as meditative tools. The text asserts that Shuka achieved Jivanmukti – achieving freedom in this life, after he meditated on the knowledge in this Upanishad that he received from Shiva. The text further asserts that anyone can achieve similar spiritual liberation by meditating on the four Mahavakyas, and there is no need for rituals, pilgrimages and mantras for the one willing to meditate on these four.

== History ==
The author and the century in which Shukarahasya Upanishad was composed is unknown. Manuscripts of this text are also found titled as Rahasyopnisad and Sukarahasyopanisad. This Upanishad is listed at number 35 in the Telugu language anthology of 108 Upanishads of the Muktika canon, narrated by Rama to Hanuman.

== Contents ==
What is Brahman?

Truth, knowledge, infinity is Brahman.

—Shukarahasya Upanishad
Translated by AGK Warrier

The text opens with sages asking Hindu god Brahma to teach them the Rahasya Upanishad. Brahma replies that he will recite to them what Vyasa, the compiler of the four Vedas, once learnt from Shiva when Vyasa asked for advice on educating his own son named Shuka. The text thereafter presents a mix of prose and verses as discourse between Shiva and Shuka, with Vyasa listening and Shiva stating that this Upanishad is in six parts.

The Pranava (Om) starts the text, consists of knowledge, poetic meter, seed, goal and the power of liberation. It is Brahman, which the text defines as truth, knowledge, infinity, eternal joy, plenitude, one, nondual, svaha to the head, vasat to the hair, and that which resides in the heart.

The path to liberation, states the Upanishad, is meditation on Mahāvākyas on self and Brahman, particularly listing these four sacred statements:

| Shukarahasya Upanishad Text | Translation | Reference |
|---|---|---|
| प्रज्ञानं ब्रह्म prajnānam brahma | "Knowledge is Brahman" | |
| अहं ब्रह्म अस्मि aham brahmāsmi | "I am Brahman" | |
| तत्त्वमसि tat tvam asi | "Thou art that" ("You are Brahman") | |
| अयम् आत्मा ब्रह्म ayam ātmā brahma | "The Atman (Self, soul) is Brahman" | |

Tat symbolizes Paramahamsa and Vamadeva, Tvam symbolizes Vishnu and Vasudeva, and Asi symbolizes Ardhanarishvara and Nrisimha, asserts the text. All these, states the Upanishad, are within oneself as Jiva, and also in all living beings, everywhere. This, claims the text, is what the six limbs of the Vedas purport to teach.

The meditation must focus on the silent witness within, the Brahman, the unity and nonduality between them, states the Upanishad. The innermost self is self-luminuous and is to be known intimately, asserts the text, the truth and all one sees in the universe is Brahman, both are one, as the Ishvara within, and their essence is satcitananda. Meditation alone is the path, the knowledge does not come as a result of rites, rituals, reciting mantra or pilgrimage.

This knowledge, states Shukarahasya text, is to be heard from the guru, then thought about, meditated upon, till one fully comprehends it. One who comprehends the ultimate Brahman becomes Brahman, asserts the text. Shuka followed this guidance from Shiva, states the text, and became one with the universe, became detached from the world at a young age and began living the free liberated life of a Jivanmukta. Though initially Vyasa was affected by his son's separation, the entire universe and he rejoiced Shuka's monastic achievement.

== See also ==
- Atma Upanishad
- Jabala Upanishad
- Nirvana Upanishad
- Yogatattva Upanishad
