= Brihat-Sannyasa Upanishad =

Minor Upanishad of Hinduism

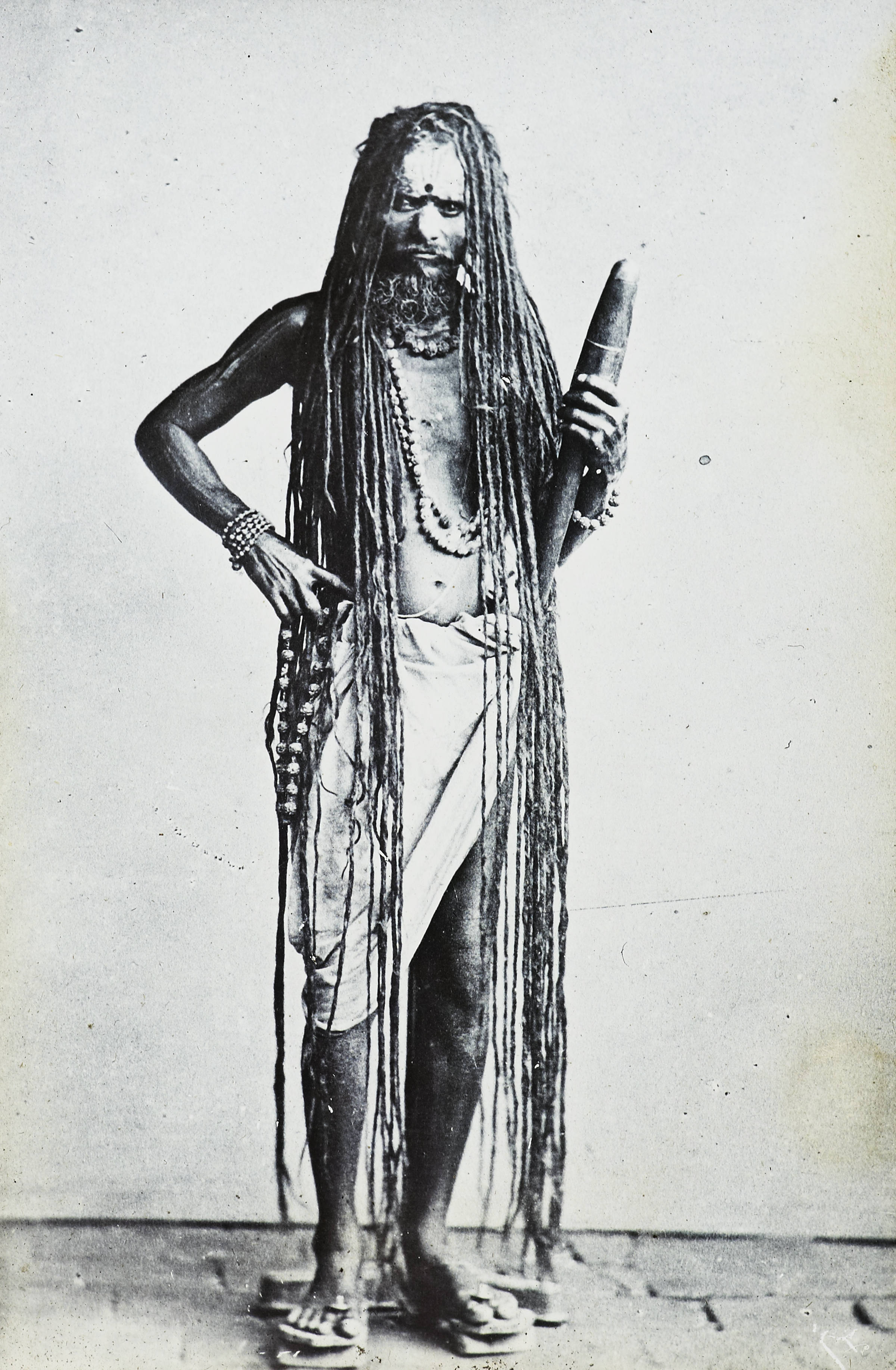
- The text discusses the monk tradition
- Devanagari: संन्यास
- IAST: Saṃnyāsa
- Title means: Renounce the world
- Date: 14th or 15th-century
- Type: Sannyasa
- Linked Veda: Samaveda
- Chapters: 2

The Brihat-Sannyasa Upanishad (Sanskrit: संन्यास उपनिषत्, IAST: Bṛhat-Saṃnyāsa Upaniṣad) is a 14th- or 15th-century Sanskrit text and one of the minor Upanishads of Hinduism. The text is attached to the Samaveda, and is one of the 20 Sannyasa (renunciation) Upanishads.

Sometimes just referred to as Sannyasa Upanishad, it is a highly damaged, corrupted text that exists in very different versions. Its style within each manuscript also varies, mixing prose and poetic verses. In some manuscripts, local titles are prefixed with terms such as Laghu (minor, shorter) and Brihad (major, greater), suggesting the manuscripts were living texts that reflected local sociocultural beliefs on sannyasa. A critical edition of the Calcutta and Poona manuscripts of Sannyasa Upanishad were compiled and translated by Paul Deussen, which also is known by the alternate title Kundika Upanishad. A very different 14th- or 15th-century CE manuscript titled Brihat-sannyasa has been translated by Patrick Olivelle.

Unlike most ancient Sannyasa Upanishads, the medieval Brihat-Sannyasa text translated by Olivelle, is notable for its six categories of monks, their begging habits and its manual-like list of who do not qualify to join the order of monks in a monastery. The disqualified from monasteries, according to Brihat-Sannyasa Upanishad, include criminals (homicide), people suffering from contagious diseases such as consumption (tuberculosis), crippled, alcoholics, eunuchs and others. However, states the text in verse 251, that these people may renounce, on their own, when in mortal danger.

People are bound by rites (rituals), and liberated by knowledge. Wise ascetics, therefore, do not perform rites.

—Brihat-Sannyasa Upanishad (Tr: Olivelle)

The text identifies six types of renouncers – Kuticaka, Bahudaka, Hamsa, Paramahamsa, Turiyatita and Avadhuta. Kutichaka is the monk who retains his sacred thread, his topknot hair style, his contacts with his family members and eats at one place. Bahudaka, states the text, is the monk who is like Kutichaka but eats only eight mouthfuls a day begged in the manner of a bee (randomly from different houses). A Hamsa monk has matted hair, is like Bahudaka, but wanders and begs from houses he has not preselected. A Paramahamsa monk has abandoned his sacred thread, cut off his topknot and hair, abandoned all social and material things, begs with his hand as bowl, and is happy whether he finds something to eat or not. A Turiyatita monk eats fruits and leaves like a cow, states the text, and the days he eats cooked food, it comes from three different houses he has never visited before. An Avadhuta monk meditates all the time on his own nature, receives food from anyone who gives it to him.

The text is notable for an operating manual-like presentation with a melange of subjects in a disorderly fashion, such as the rites of renunciation before becoming a monk, abrupt verses reminding ascetics not to speak to women, another set reminding them not to perform divine worship of any kind, never recite mantras, never take food that has been offered before idols, never accept metal objects, poison or weapons as donation, and instructions such as,

Outside a time of distress, an ascetic shall never carry any provisions for a journey. During a time of distress when food is unavailable, he may take with him a cooked dish. A young and healthy mendicant should not live in a monastery. One should not accept something for the use of another (...)

— Brihat-Sannyasa Upanishad, Translated by Patrick Olivelle

The first chapter of the Sannyasa Upanishad is identical to the first chapter of the ancient Kathashruti Upanishad. The text also references and includes fragments of Sanskrit text from the medieval era Hindu text Yoga Vasistha, as well as other Upanishads.

The date or author of Sannyasa Upanishad is unknown, but other than the chapter 1 it includes from Kathashruti Upanishad, the rest of the text is likely a late medieval era text. Olivelle and Sprockhoff suggest it to be 14th- or 15th-century text.

Manuscripts of this text are also found titled as Sannyasopanishad. In the Telugu language anthology of 108 Upanishads of the Muktika canon, narrated by Rama to Hanuman, it is listed at number 65.

== See also ==
- Aruni Upanishad
- Jabala Upanishad
- Laghu-Sannyasa Upanishad
- Nirvana Upanishad
