= Garuda Upanishad =

Hindu Vaishnava scripture

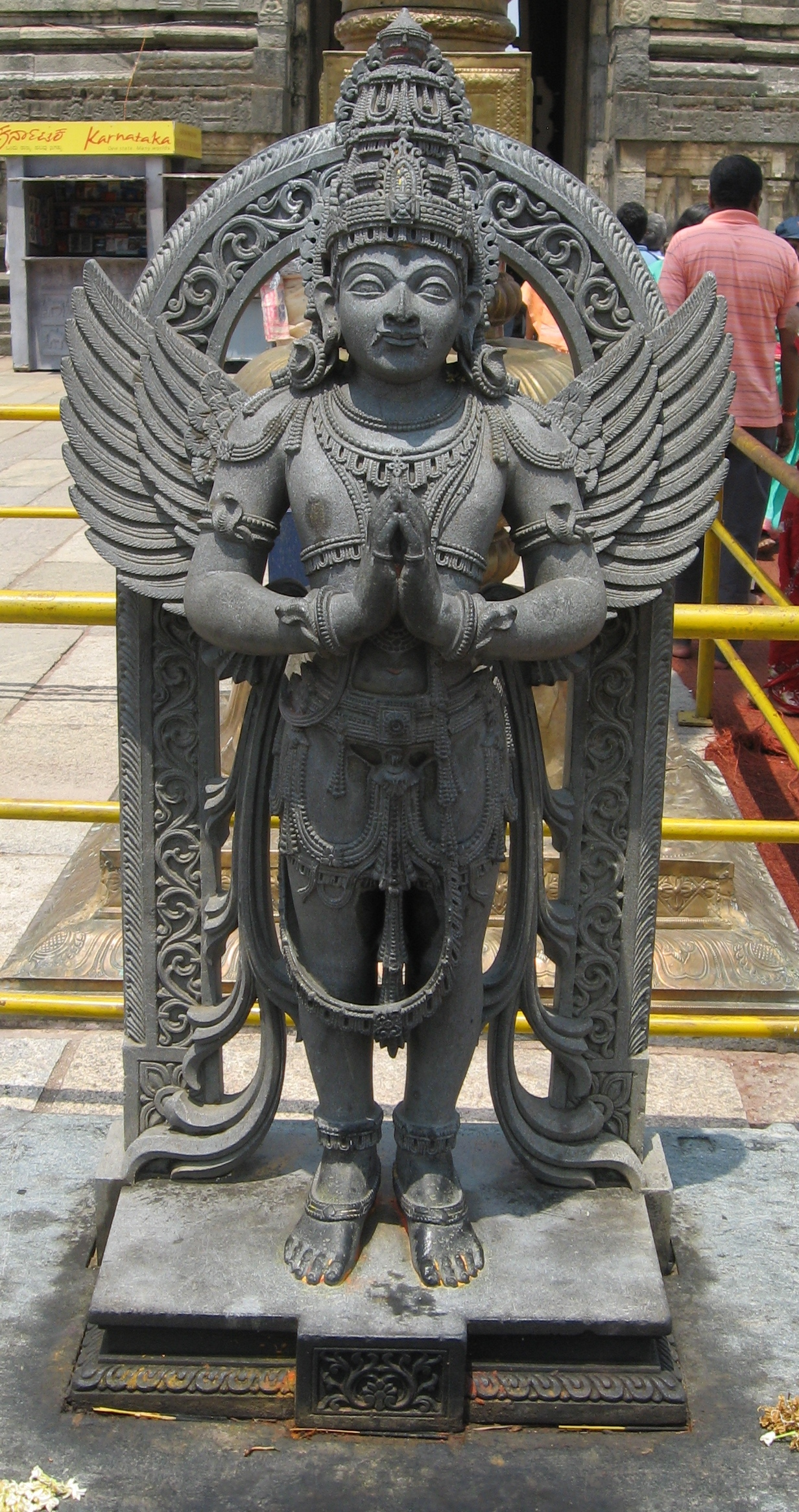
- Statue of Garuda, Belur
- Devanagari: गरुडोपनिषद्
- IAST: Garuḍopaniṣad
- Title means: The Upanishad of Garuda
- Type: Vaishnava
- Linked Veda: Atharvaveda
- Chapters: 1
- Verses: 25

Garuda Upanishad or Garudopanishad is one of 108 Upanishadic Hindu scriptures, written in Sanskrit language. It is dedicated to Garuda, the eagle-demigod mount of the god Vishnu. It is a Vaishnava Upanishad, and associated with the Vaishnava sect, which worships Vishnu, and is associated with the Atharvaveda. It is considered as "late" Upanishad in terms of dating. The Garuda Upanishad has mantras and charms that are said to cure poison. The text says that its charms not only prevent and remedy snakebite and the venom, but also poison from any other source like other poisonous animals, weapons and supernatural beings. Therefore, the Upanishad aim to seek freedom from fear of all types of poisonous creatures.

== Purpose ==
The German orientalist Paul Deussen, who partially translated the Garuda Upanishad describes it essentially as a snake-charm dedicated to Garuda, the mount of Vishnu, and the eternal foe of serpents. It serves two objectives: to prevent snakebite and to alleviate the evil effects of the bite. The snake charm was elevated to the status of the Upanishad due to the imminent danger of snakebite in India, where people had to walk in the dark in snake-infested regions or work in fields and forests. Pious people following the dictum of Ahimsa have to resort to snake charm, as for them killing snakes is taboo. The snake charm is similar to the other spells of the sage Bharadvaja, who is said to have taught the Garuda Upanishad charms to his disciples. Bharadvaja's spells are said to prevent or cure infectious diseases, wounds by weapons and carnivorous wild beasts like tigers and bites and infestations by insects and worms. However, snakes feature prominently in these spells due to higher probability and danger of snakebite.

== Content ==
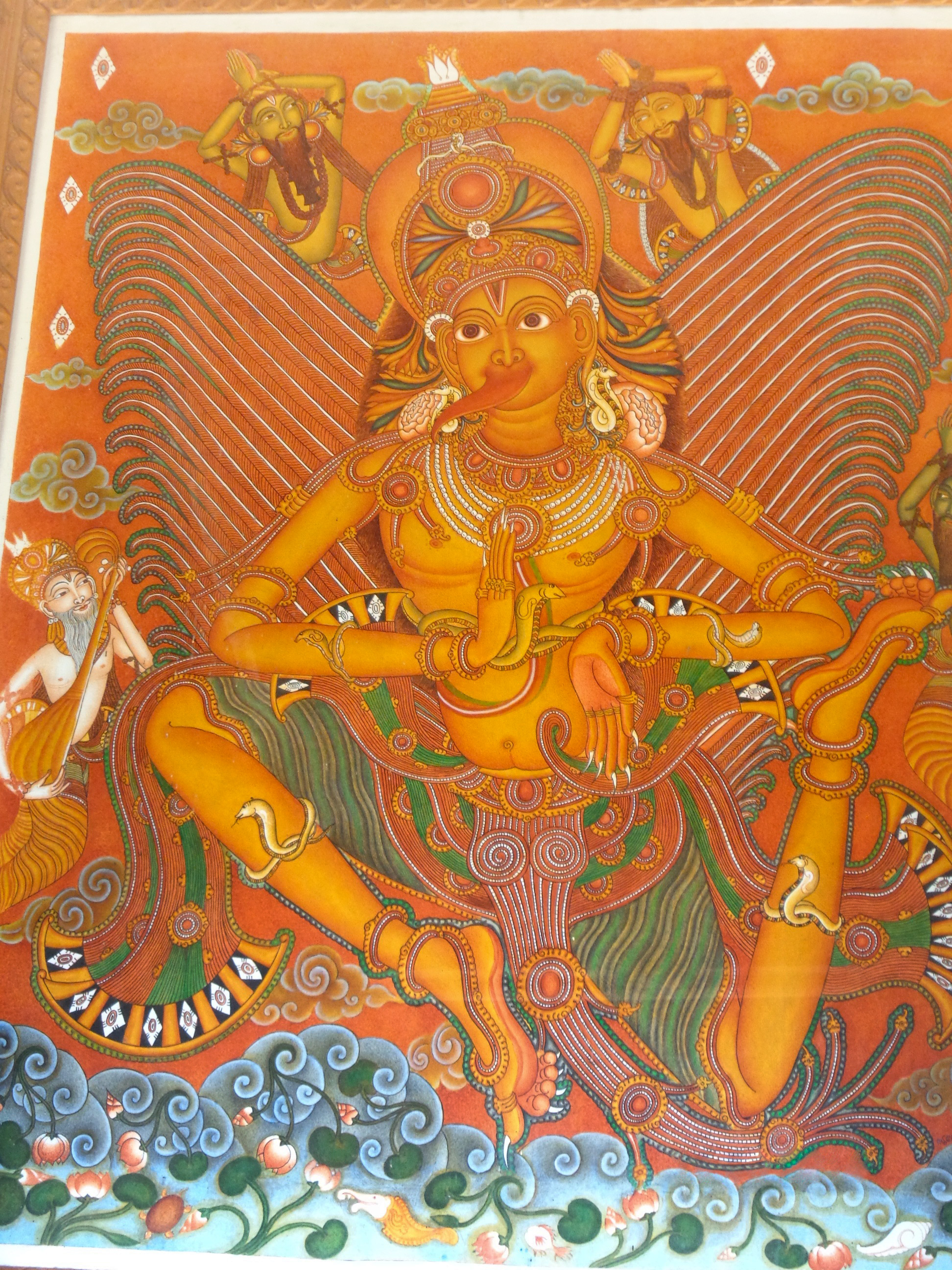
Garuda wearing various serpent-ornaments.

The Garuda Upanishad has 25 stanzas. It begins with a generic prayer to the gods for protection. Garuda, Indra, the sun-god Surya and Brihaspati are invoked for their blessing. The prayer ends with the wish: Let there be Peace. The text declares this knowledge was taught by the god Brahma to the sage Narada. It was passed through successive teachers: Narada, Brihatsena, the god Indra, the sage Bharadvaja. Bharadvaja taught it to his students, who spread it across the world. This scientific knowledge is said to destroy poison in all its forms. Then starts the sermon of Brahma to Narada.

The second part is dedicated to the iconography or dhyana of Garuda. A dhyana is the iconographical form of a deity that a devotee must visualize while performing dhyana (meditation). Meditating on a deity is said to placate the god. The dhyana in the Garuda Upanishad is also replicated in other texts. Garuda is said to be wearing various Nagas (serpent-gods) as ornaments. The Naga Vasuki is his sacred thread. Takshaka is his girdle. Padma and Mahapadma are his earrings, Karkota his necklace, Shankha and Gulika his jewels. Other nagas serve him as his servants. Garuda's iconography is consistent with a bird of prey like an eagle or a kite. His body is reddish-saffron. His hips are white, his lower legs golden, his arms long and his shoulders broad. His face is fair. The beak is bluish-dark. The great mount of Vishnu, Garuda, is finally invoked to destroy poison.

The third part is incantations. Garuda is praised as the lord of birds with allusions to his iconography. He is invoked to annihilate the poison. Then "she" is called to destroy the poison and kills it finally. It is unclear who the feminine pronouns are referring to, possibly the shakti of Garuda. The poison is killed by Garuda's magic, by Indra's thunderbolt weapon (Vajra).

The fourth part is a hymn (stotra) to Garuda. Garuda is exalted. Various parts of his body are compared to Vedic poetic meters like the Gayatri mantra-meter, stomas (division of the Vedas), and sacred texts called Saman.

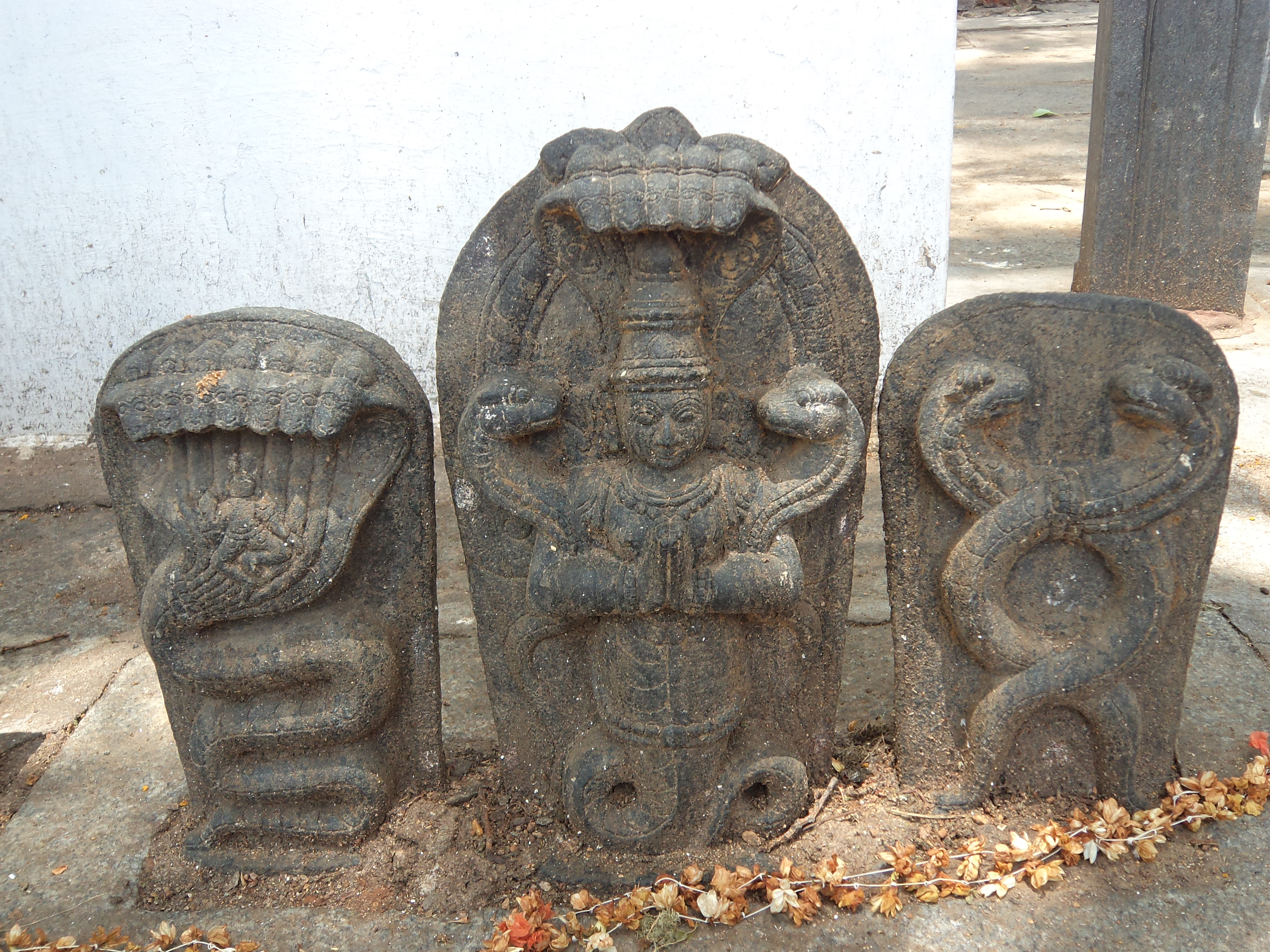
Nagas worshipped in a Hindu temple.

The fifth part are charms to counter the divine Nagas or their messengers. The charm to counter the Nagas Anantaka (Ananta), Vasuki, Takshaka, Karkotaka (Karkota), Pulika, Shakha(ka), Padma(ka), Mahapadma(ka), Gulika, Kulika, Paundra, Kalika, Elapatraka (Ela) and Nagaka are told. The charm is repeated many times starting with the name of the Naga it counters. The charm which partly appears in the "Incantations" part of the Upanishad. "He moves", referring to Garuda; then "she will do the job, destroy the poison" and the poison is declared destroyed. The destruction of poison is again associated to Indra's weapon (Vajra).

The end of this part states where the charms can be used. Diseases caused by the Nagas as well as wounds by their "venomous beaks, teeth, tusks, limbs and tails"; infestations caused by other poisonous animals like scorpions, spiders, lizards, rats, insects found in places such as houses, forests, fields, mountains, and bites by animals including tigers, dogs, worms and boars are cured by the charm. The text declares that the charm is a remedy for cuts, spits and other wounds by poisonous arrows, swords and other weapons as well as wounds by harmful supernatural beings like Yakshas (nature-spirits), Rakshasas (demons), pretas (ghosts) and bhutas (ghosts). The text emphasizes that poison from any source can be cured by these charms.

The last part of the Upanishad is by tradition the "fruit" of the text, which tells the advantages of the text. One who listens to the Garuda Upanishad on an amavashya (new moon night) is said to immune a person from snake bite for 12 years. One who hears the text and keeps it with him as an amulet is saved from snakebite for life. One who teaches it to eight Brahmins, will be able to cure snakebite by touching the inflicted person with grass, wood or ashes. One who teaches it to a hundred Brahmins, can cure poison by looking the wound. One who teaches it to a thousand can cure it by mere thought.

== Publication ==
The Garuda Upanishad was first published in 1883 by S. Subrahmanya in Telugu language in Chennai, India and then in 1885 in Albrecht Weber. In 1891, G. A. Jacob published it in his Eleven Atharvana Upanishads. Paul Deussen partially translated it into German and published it in 1897. V. L. Panshikar Shastri published it numerous times in Mumbai in Sanskrit; first edition in 1913. Another version was published by Adayar Library in Chennai in 1923. While the text is the same in Panshikar Shastri's and Adiyar Library's edition, numbering of paragraphs differs; the Chennai edition is considered more accurate.
