= Shakta Upanishads =

Upanishads that adhere to the goddess-centric tradition

Shakta Upanishads are a group of minor Upanishads of Hinduism related to the Shaktism theology of a Goddess (Devi) as the Supreme Being. There are 8 Shakta Upanishads in the Muktika anthology of 108 Upanishads. They, along with other minor Upanishads, are generally classified separate from the thirteen major Principal Upanishads considered to be from the ancient Vedic tradition.

The Shakta Upanishads also contrast from other groups of minor Upanishads, such as the Samanya Upanishads which are of a generic nature, the Sannyasa Upanishads which focus on the Hindu renunciation and monastic practice, the Yoga Upanishads related to Yoga, the Shaiva Upanishads which highlight aspects of Shaivism, and the Vaishnava Upanishads which highlight Vaishnavism.

Composed in medieval India, the Shakta Upanishads are among the most recent minor Upanishads, and constitute an important source of information on Devi worship and Tantra-related theology. Some Shakta Upanishads exist in more than one version.

The Shakta Upanishads are notable for declaring and revering the feminine as the Supreme, the primal cause and the metaphysical concepts in Hinduism called Brahman and Atman (soul). The philosophical premises in many Shakta Upanishads, states June McDaniel, is syncretism of Samkhya and Advaita Vedanta schools of Hindu philosophy, called Shaktadavaitavada (literally, the path of monistic Shakti).

== Date ==
The composition dates and authors of the Shakta Upanishads are unknown. Patrick Olivelle states that sectarian Upanishads attached to Atharvaveda were likely composed in the second millennium, until about the 16th century. The Shakta Upanishads, states Denise Cush, were composed between the 12th- and 15th-century CE.

== List of 8 Shakta Upanishads ==
List of the Shakta Upanishads according to Muktikā anthology
Title	Muktikā Serial Number	Attached Veda
Sita Upanishad	45	Atharva Veda
Tripuratapini Upanishad	80	Atharva Veda
Devi Upanishad	81	Atharva Veda
Tripura Upanishad	82	Rigveda
Bhavana Upanishad	84	Atharva Veda
Saubhagyalakshmi Upanishad	105	Rigveda
Sarasvati-rahasya Upanishad	106	Krishna Yajurveda
Bahvricha Upanishad	107	Rigveda

== See also ==
- Hindu texts
- Puranas
