= Tripuratapini Upanishad =

Medieval era Sanskrit text

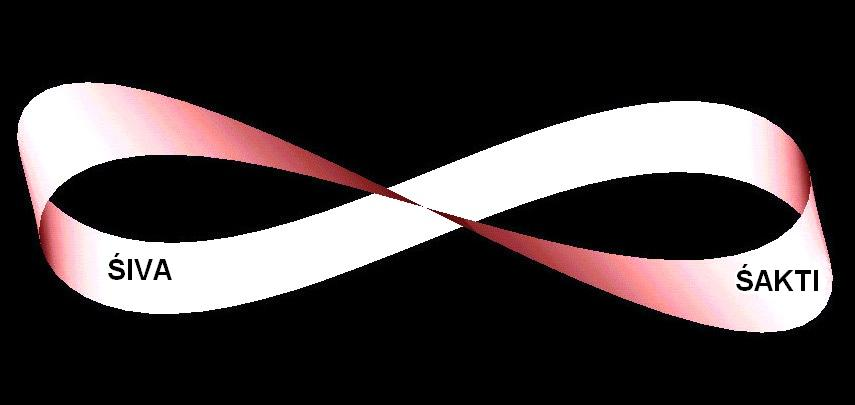
- The Upanishad presents goddess Shakti and god Shiva together as the source of universe
- Devanagari: त्रिपुरातापिनी
- IAST: Tripurātāpinī
- Title means: Devotee of the three cities
- Date: 12th- to 15th-century CE
- Type: Shakta
- Linked Veda: Atharvaveda
- Chapters: 5
- Philosophy: Shaktism, Shakta, Vedanta

The Tripuratapini Upanishad (Sanskrit: त्रिपुरातापिनी उपनिषद्, IAST: Tripurātāpinī Upaniṣad) is a medieval era Sanskrit text and one of the minor Upanishads of Hinduism. It is classified as one of the eight Shakta Upanishads and attached to the Atharvaveda.

The Upanishad is a notable goddess and tantra-related text. It asserts that the universe was created by the union of Shiva and Shakti, that all existence is interdependent on both the feminine and the masculine. The text presents Tripura, as the primordial power, as the great goddess of three cities, tantra chakras (yantra) as means of her worship, the wheel of kamakala and describes mantras to remember her.

The last chapter of the Upanishad is an Advaita-style discussion of goddess (Shakti) as the ultimate reality Brahman with the text asserting that one's Atman (self, soul) is identical with the Brahman. These philosophical premises of Tripuratapini Upanishad belong to the Shaktadavaitavada tradition (literally, the path of nondualistic Shakti).

== History ==
The author and the century in which Tripuratapini Upanishad was composed is unknown. The text was likely composed, in the same period as other Shakta Upanishads, between the 12th- and 15th-century CE. While this text is a relatively late composition in the Upanishadic collection, literary evidence confirms that Shakta Tantrism has roots in ancient times and the interaction between Vedic and Tantric traditions trace back to at least the sixth century, and the surge in Tantra tradition developments during the late medieval period, states Geoffrey Samuel, were a means to confront and cope with Islamic invasions and political instability in and after 14th-century CE in parts of India and Tibet.

The Tripuratapini Upanishad, along with Tripura Upanishad, have attracted scholarly bhasya (commentary) in the second half of 2nd-millennium, such as by Bhaskararaya, and by Ramanand.

Manuscripts of this text are also found titled as Tripuratapinyopanisad and Tripuratapinyupanisad, but latter is different in structure and verses than former, even though the message is similar in both. In the Telugu language anthology of 108 Upanishads of the Muktika canon, narrated by Rama to Hanuman, it is listed at number 80.

== Contents ==
The text consists of 5 chapters, each of which it calls as an Upanishad.

The first Upanishad section describes the nature of Tripura - the goddess of three cities, asserting that the world was created by the union of Shiva and the Shakti of Tripura. The three Bija (seeds), asserts the text, are Vagbhava-kuta (peak of creative feeling), Kama-kuta (peak of desire) and Shakti-kuta (peak of power), and text explains all of them as coded Gayatri Mantra.

Meditation

Free of attachment to objects,
enveloped in the heart (Note: The fifth chapter describes the heart as the temple of one's soul, self.)
the mind ceases to be the mind.
This is the supreme state,
control the mind,
till it quietens within the heart,
this is knowledge,
this is meditation.

— Tripuratapini Upanishad 5.7-8
Translated by William Mahony

Tat states the text is the eternal Brahman (metaphysical reality), manifesting in the world as that filled with desires, or Shiva. Tat is reflected by ka within ka-e-i-la-hrim tantric code, while the la in that code is goddess earth. Similarly, the text maps all the portions of Vedic Gayatri mantra to be part of the secret code within the Srividya and Srichakra as it discusses Kama-kuta, asserting it to be feminine and her procreative nature. The Shakti-kuta, is described by the text as a code for the genderless individual Self (soul), masculine god (Shiva) and feminine goddess (Tripura). To accomplish Vagbhava-kuta is to master speech, to accomplish Kama-kuta is to master splendor, and to accomplish Sakti-kuta is to master and attract all three worlds, asserts the Tripuratapini text.

The second Upanishad part describes Tripura-vidya (knowledge of the Tripura), in three forms - Atmasana, Shakti and Shiva. The text explains Srichakra first in natural order and then in reverse order, then describes techniques for goddess worship and methods for devotion to her. The third Upanishad part describes Yantras (mystic geometrical diagrams), as a means to conceptualize the divine within and for external ritualistic devotion. The fourth Upanishad part is shortest of all chapters, and asserts a theory of life, the meaning of Bhagavati, and the possibility of victory over death. Goddess Tripura, states Mahadevan, is presented here in tantric terms, as the Kundalini Shakti.

The fifth and last Upanishad part is predominantly philosophical, presenting its theory of the abstract nirguna Brahman (ultimate unchanging reality without qualities, without attributes), one's Atman (unchanging reality within as soul, self), mind as a source of egotism, superficial cravings and suffering. Thereafter, the text asserts that the spiritual person should quieten this mind, meditate and know of the Atman within his heart, know that same one soul exists in all beings and this is identical with the formless Brahman.

== Influence ==
The Tripuratapini Upanishad along with Bhavana Upanishad, Devi Upanishad and Sri Sukta of the Rigveda, states Brooks, is often appended in both Kaula and Samaya Tantra traditions to Shri Vidya rituals. This suggests the text's widespread reach across two major tantra traditions, and their attempts to link relatively modern texts to ancient Vedic foundations.

== See also ==
- Devi
- Jabala Upanishad
- Nirvana Upanishad
- Yogatattva Upanishad
