= Shaktism =

Goddess-centric sect of Hinduism

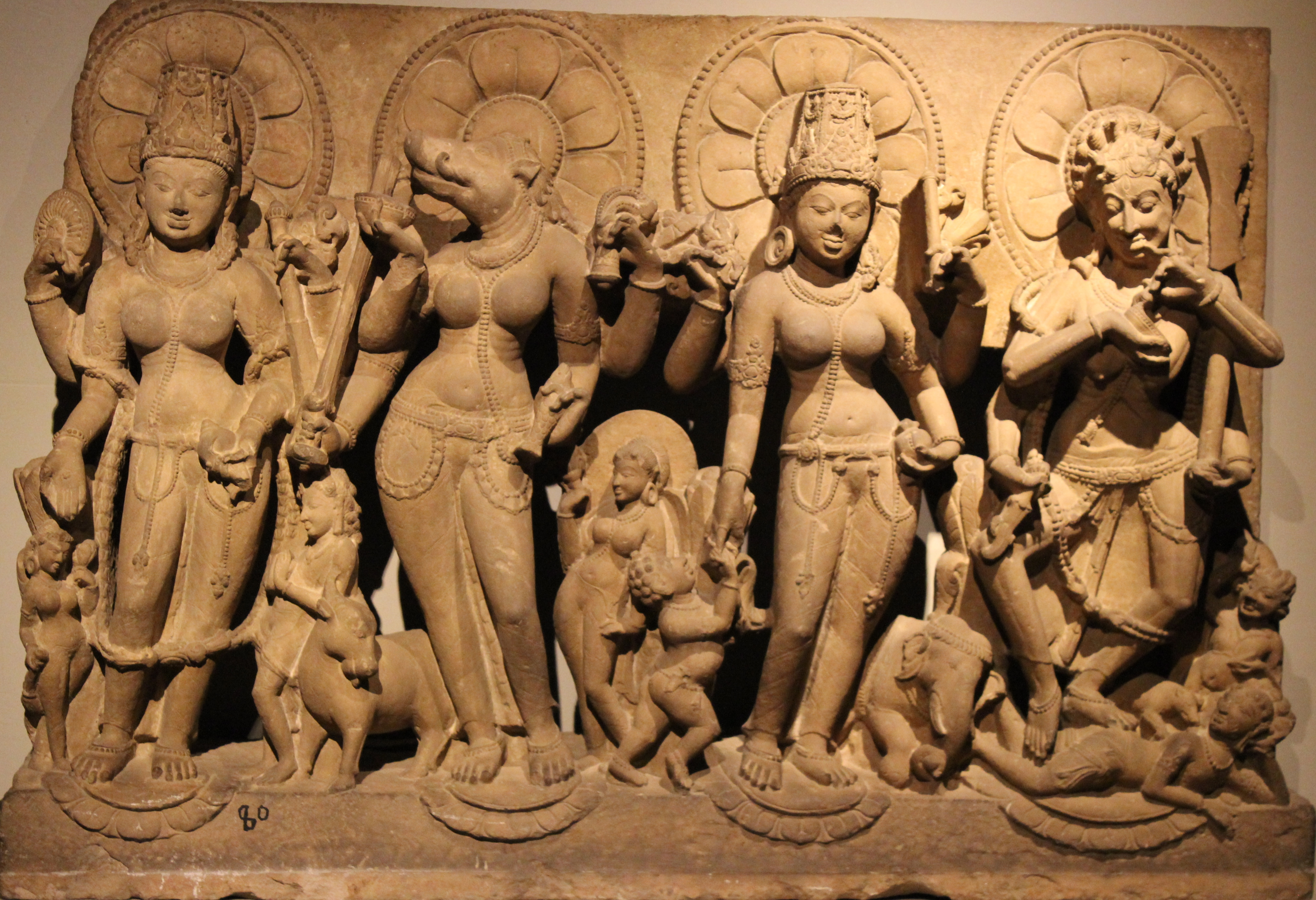
Shaktism is a goddess-centric Hindu tradition; relief statues of Matrikas: from left to right Vaishnavi, Varahi, Indrani, Chamunda

Shaktism (Note: Sanskrit: शाक्तसम्प्रदायः, romanised: Śāktasampradāyaḥ) is a major Hindu denomination in which Shakti or the divine feminine energy is revered as the Ultimate reality. Shaktism is primarily marked by the worship of Hindu goddesses (Devi), who are regarded as manifestations or personifications of Shakti.

While Mahadevi or the great Goddess is held as being the supreme Goddess in Shaktism, the most prominently worshiped goddesses are Durga, the vanquisher of evil and restorer of cosmic order; and Kali, the primal force of time and transformation. Additionally, Shaktism reveres a broader pantheon of goddesses, including Saraswati, the goddess of knowledge, wisdom and arts; Lakshmi, the goddess of wealth and prosperity; Parvati, the gentle yet powerful mother goddess of fertility and devotion; and Tripura Sundari, the goddess of beauty and grace. Also honoured are the various Gramadevata (local village guardian deities), who protect and bless their communities. Following the decline of Buddhism in India, elements of Hindu and Buddhist goddess worship gradually merged, culminating in the emergence of the Mahavidya, a revered group of ten fierce and esoteric goddesses central to the tantric traditions within Shaktism.

The Sruti and Smriti texts of Hinduism form an important scriptural framework in Shaktism. Scriptures such as the Devi Mahatmya, Devi-Bhagavata Purana, Kalika Purana, and Shakta Upanishads like the Devi Upanishad are revered. In Shaktism, the Devi Mahatmya is considered to be as important as the Bhagavad Gita. The Devi (Shakti) is revered in many Hindu temples and is worshipped during a number of Hindu festivals. The goddess-focused tradition and its festivals, such as the Durga Puja, are very popular in eastern India.

== Origins and history ==
The earliest archaeological evidence of what appears to be an Upper Paleolithic shrine for Shakti worship were discovered in the terminal Upper Paleolithic site of Baghor I (Baghor stone) in Sidhi district of Madhya Pradesh, India. The excavations were conducted under the guidance of archaeologists G. R. Sharma of Allahabad University and J. Desmond Clark of the University of California, with assistance from Jonathan Mark Kenoyer and J. N. Pal. The Baghor formation was dated to between 9000 BC and 8000 BC. The origins of Shakti worship may also be traced to the Indus Valley Civilisation.

Among the earliest evidence of reverence for the female aspect of the deity in Hinduism is this passage in chapter 10.125 of the Rig Veda, also called the Devi Suktam hymn:

I am the Queen, the gatherer-up of treasures, most thoughtful, first of those who merit worship. Thus Gods have established me in many places with many homes to enter and abide in. Through me alone all eat the food that feeds them, – each man who sees, breathes, hears the word outspoken. They know it not, yet I reside in the essence of the Universe. Hear, one and all, the truth as I declare it. ....I created all worlds at my will, without any higher being, and permeate and dwell within them. The eternal and infinite consciousness is I, it is my greatness dwelling in everything.

— Devi Sukta, Rigveda 10.125.3 – 10.125.8,

The Vedic literature reveres various goddesses, but far less frequently than the gods Indra, Agni and Soma. The goddesses often mentioned in the Vedic layers of text include the Ushas (dawn), Vāc (speech, wisdom), Sarasvati (as river), Prithivi (earth), Nirriti (annihilator), Shraddha (faith, confidence). In Kena Upanishad (sections 3-4), the goddess Uma is described as another aspect of divine and the knower of ultimate knowledge (Brahman).

Shakteya pooja performed by a Thiyyar at an ancient kavu in Meppayur, Kerala, along with the prasadam. Malabar Shakteyam, which is distinct from other Shakteya traditions, is practised by the Thiyyars of Malabar, whose principal deity is Kurumba Bhagavathy. Their lifestyle, customs, and rituals are deeply rooted in Shakteyam. The term Thiyyar itself means Vamacharari.

Hymns to goddesses are also in Mahabharata, particularly in the Harivamsa section (100 to 300 CE) to the work. Thomas B. Coburn notes that by about the third or fourth century, archaeological and textual evidence suggest the goddess had become as prominent as God. Shakti theology developed in ancient India, reaching its peak in one of the most important texts of Shaktism, the Devi Mahatmya. C. Mackenzie Brown describes the text as both the culmination of centuries of Indian ideas about the divine woman and the foundation for the literary and spiritual focus on female transcendence in the centuries that followed. The Devi Mahatmya is considered in Shaktism to be as important as the Bhagavad Gita. According to Thomas Coburn, the Devi-Mahatmya is not the earliest literary fragment attesting to the devotion to a goddess figure, but "it is surely the earliest in which the object of worship is conceptualized as goddess, with a capital G".

== Theology ==
[T]he central conception of Hindu philosophy is of the Absolute; that is the background of the universe. This Absolute Being, of whom we can predicate nothing, has Its powers spoken of as She - that is, the real personal God in India is She.

— Swami Vivekananda

Shaktas regard Shakti as the supreme, ultimate, eternal reality of all existence-the same as the Brahman concept in wider Hinduism. She is simultaneously considered as the source, embodiment, and energy of the cosmos, and that into which everything ultimately dissolves. The Devi Upanishad verse 2 states: "I am essentially Brahman". According to V. R. Ramachandra Dikshitar, a professor of Indian history, in Shaktist theology, "Brahman is static Shakti and Shakti is dynamic Brahman." The Devi-Bhagavata Purana states:

I am Manifest Divinity, Unmanifest Divinity, and Transcendent Divinity.... I am Female; I am Male in the form of Shiva. (Note: Srimad Devi Bhagavatam, VII.33.13-15, cited in Brown 1990.)

Shaktism does not reject the masculine, but rejects the dualisms such as masculine-feminine, male-female, soul-body, transcendent-immanent dualism, affirming nature as divine. According to C. MacKenzie Brown, cultural concepts of the masculine and feminine among practitioners of Shaktism are aspects of the divine, transcendent reality. This concept is represented in Hindu iconography by Ardhanari, the half-Shakti, half-Shiva deity.

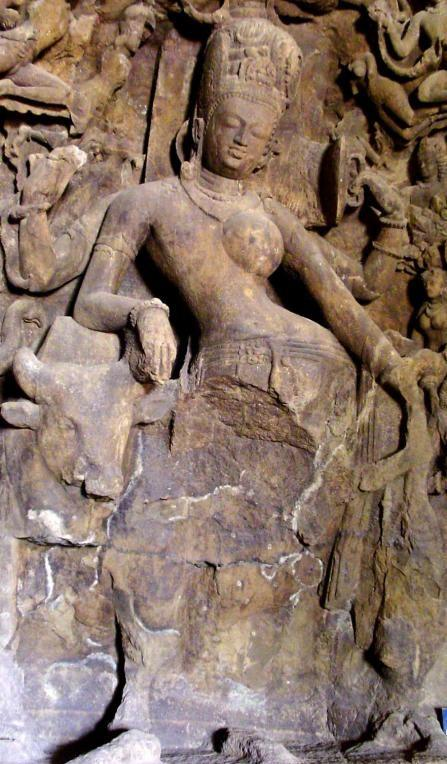
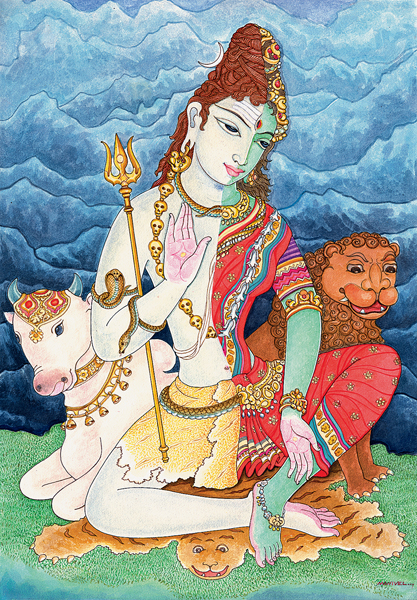
In Shakta theology, the female and male are interdependent realities, represented with Ardhanarishvara icon. Left: A 5th century art work representing this idea at the Elephanta Caves; Right: a painting of Ardhanarishvara.

June McDaniel notes that many Shakta texts reflect a syncretism of the Samkhya and Advaita Vedanta schools, called Shaktadavaitavada (literally, the 'path of nondualistic Shakti').

Swami Vivekananda explained that the true Shakti-worshipper sees "God is the omnipresent force in the universe and sees in women the manifestation of that Force." Sri Ramakrishna believed that all Hindu goddesses are manifestations of the same mother goddess. The 18th-century Shakta bhakti poems and songs were composed by two Bengal court poets, Bharatchandra Ray and Ramprasad Sen, and the Tamil collection Abhirami Anthadhi was composed by Abhirami Bhattar.

=== Scriptures ===
The scriptures of Shaktism include the Shakta Upanishads, as well as Shakti-oriented Upa Puranic literature, such as the Devi Purana, the Kalika Purana, and the Lalita sahasranama (from the Brahmanda Purana). The Tripura Upanishad is historically the most complete introduction to Shakta Tantrism, distilling into its 16 verses almost every important topic in Shakta Tantra tradition. Along with the Tripura Upanishad, the Tripuratapini Upanishad has attracted scholarly bhasya (commentary) in the second half of the 2nd millennium, such as the work of Bhaskararaya and Ramanand. These texts might link the Shakti Tantra tradition to the Vedas, but this link has been contested by scholars. Scriptures such as the Devi Mahatmya, Devi-Bhagavata Purana, Kalika Purana, and Shakta Upanishads, like the Devi Upanishad are also revered.

==== Devi Gita ====
The soul and the Goddess

My sacred syllable ह्रीम्] transcends, (Note: ह्रीम् is pronounced as hrīm, it is a tantric mantra bīja, and it identifies a "Shakti".)
the distinction of name and named,
beyond all dualities.
It is whole, infinite being, consciousness and bliss.
One should meditate on that reality,
within the flaming light of consciousness.
Fixing the mind upon me,
as the Goddess transcending all space and time,
One quickly merges with me by realizing,
the oneness of the soul and Brahman.

— Devi Gita, Transl: Lynn Foulston, Stuart Abbott
Devibhagavata Purana, Book 7

The seventh book of the Srimad Devi-Bhagavatam presents the theology of Shaktism. This book is called Devi Gita (Song of the Goddess). The goddess explains she is the Brahman that created the world, asserting the Advaita premise that spiritual liberation occurs when one fully comprehends the identity of one's soul and the Brahman. This knowledge, asserts the goddess, comes from detaching self from the world and meditating on one's own soul.

The Devi Gita, like the Bhagavad Gita, is a condensed philosophical treatise. It presents the divine female as a powerful and compassionate creator, pervader, and protector of the universe. She is presented in the opening chapter of the Devi Gita as the benign and beautiful world-mother, called Bhuvaneshvari (literally, ruler of the universe). Thereafter, the text presents its theological and philosophical teachings.

The Devi Gita describes the Devi (or goddess) as "universal, cosmic energy" resident within each individual. It thus weaves in the terminology of the Samkhya school of Hindu philosophy. The text is suffused with Advaita Vedanta ideas, wherein nonduality is emphasised, all dualities are declared as incorrect, and interconnected oneness of all living beings' souls with Brahman is held as the liberating knowledge. However, adds Tracy Pintchman, a professor of religious studies and Hinduism, Devi Gita incorporates Tantric ideas, giving the Devi a form and motherly character rather than the gender-neutral concept of Adi Shankara's Advaita Vedanta.

=== List of 8 Shakta Upanishads ===
List of the Shakta Upanishads according to Muktikā anthology
| Title | Muktika serial # | Attached Veda |
|---|---|---|
| Sita Upanishad | 45 | Atharva Veda |
| Tripuratapini Upanishad | 80 | Atharva Veda |
| Devi Upanishad | 81 | Atharva Veda |
| Tripura Upanishad | 82 | Rigveda |
| Bhavana Upanishad | 84 | Atharva Veda |
| Saubhagyalakshmi Upanishad | 105 | Rigveda |
| Sarasvati-rahasya Upanishad | 106 | Krishna Yajurveda |
| Bahvricha Upanishad | 107 | Rigveda |

== Principal deities ==
Shaktism is a goddess-centric tradition of Hinduism in which many goddesses are regarded as various aspects, manifestations, or personifications of the supreme goddess, Shakti. Shaktas worship the Devi in many forms, but all are considered as expressions of the one supreme goddess. The primary form of Devi worshiped by a Shakta is the ishta-devi, that is a personally selected Devi. The selection of this deity can depend on many factors such as family tradition, regional practice, guru lineage, and personal resonance.

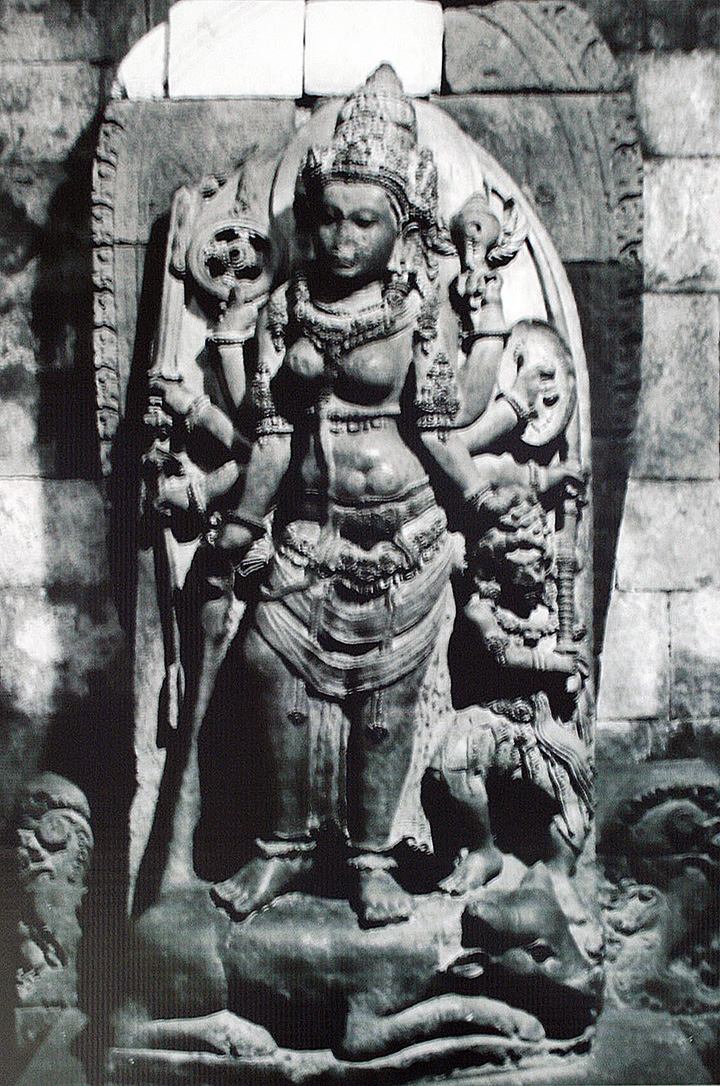
A 9th-century Durga Shakti idol, victorious over demon Mahishasura, at the Shiva temple, Prambanan, Indonesia

Some forms of the goddess are widely known in the Hindu world. By the mid 1st-millennium CE, deities such as Parvati, Durga, Kali, Yogamaya, Lakshmi, Saraswati, Gayatri, Radha, and Sita were already prominent within Shaktism. In eastern India, after the decline of Buddhism in India, various Hindu and Buddhist goddesses were combined to form the Mahavidya, a pantheon of ten goddesses.

Among tantric Shaktas, rare forms of Devi include the Mahavidyas, particularly Tripura Sundari, Bhuvaneshvari, Tara, Bhairavi, Chhinnamasta, Dhumavati, Bagalamukhi, Matangi, and Kamala.

Other major goddess groups include the Sapta-Matrika ("Seven Mothers"), described as the energies of different major gods who assist the supreme Devi in her battles with deamons, and the 64 Yoginis. The eight forms of the goddess Lakshmi (Ashtalakshmi) and the nine forms of goddess Durga (the Navadurgas) are mainly worshipped during the Navaratri festival. Numerous local goddesses (Gramadevatas) are also worshipped across villages in India.

== Tantric traditions ==
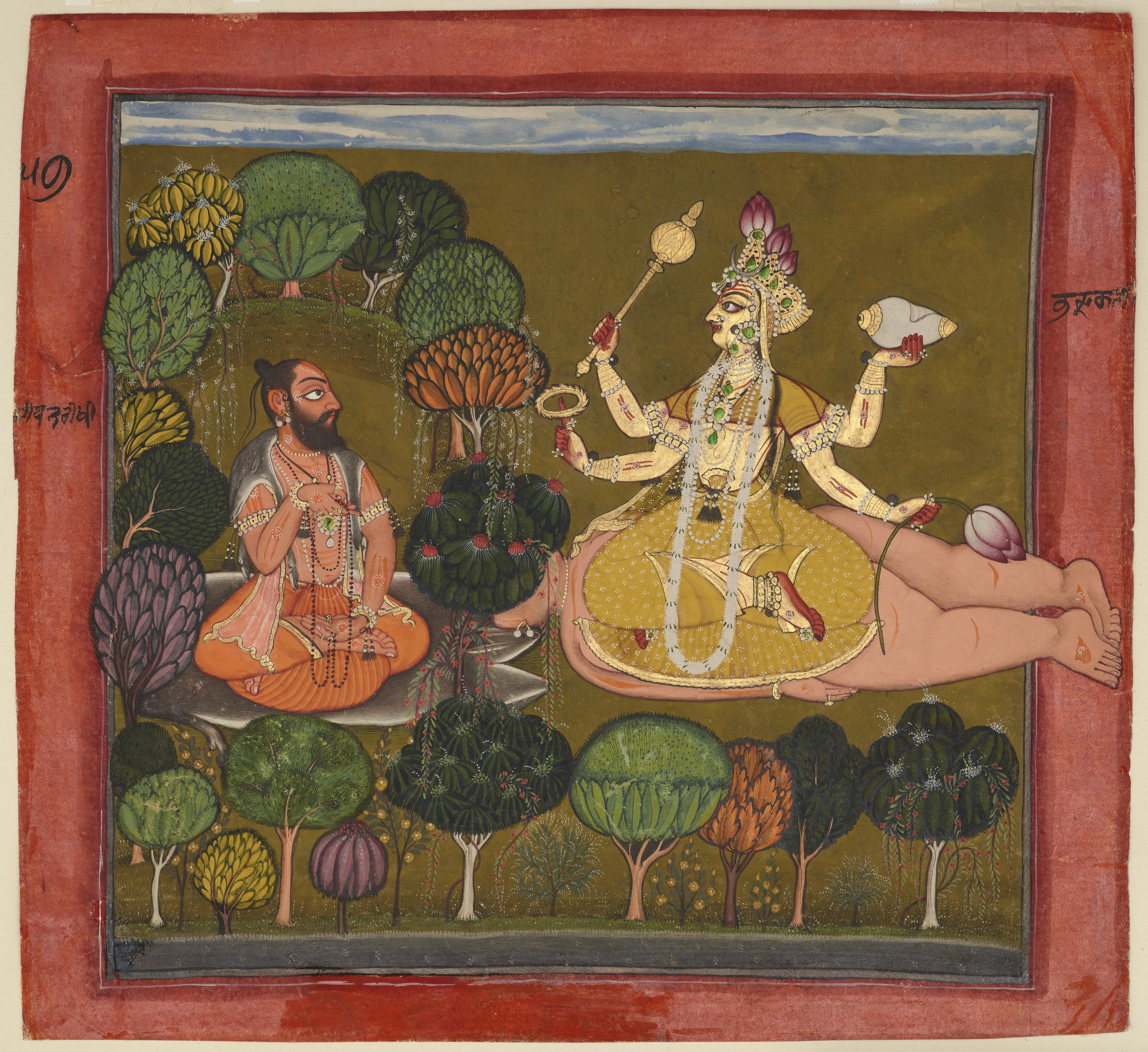
A sage, Rishi Chyavana, worships Devi, an 18th-century painting from the Tantrik Devi Series, Punjab, India

Sub-traditions of Shaktism include "Tantra", which refers to techniques, practices and ritual grammar involving mantra, yantra, nyasa, mudra and certain elements of traditional kundalini yoga, typically practiced under the guidance of a qualified guru after due initiation (diksha) and oral instruction to supplement various written sources. There has been a historic debate between Shakta theologians on whether its tantric practices are Vedic or non-Vedic.

The roots of Shakta Tantrism are unclear, probably ancient and independent of the Vedic tradition of Hinduism. The interaction between Vedic and Tantric traditions trace back to at least the sixth century, and the surge in Tantra tradition developments during the late medieval period, states Geoffrey Samuel, were a means to confront and cope with Islamic invasions and political instability in and after the 14th century CE.

Notable Shakta tantras are Saradatilaka Tantra of Lakshmanadesika (11th century), Kali Tantra (c. 15th century), Yogini Tantra, Sarvanandanatha's Sarvolassa Tantra, Brahmananda Giri's Saktananda Tarangini with Tararahasya and Purnananda Giri's Syamarahasya with Sritattvacintamani (16th century), Krishananda Agamavagisa's Tantrasara and Raghunatna Tarkavagisa Bhattacarya Agamatattvavilasa (17th century), as well as works of Bhaskaracharya (18th century).

=== Vidyāpīṭha ===
The Vidyāpīṭha is subdivided into Vāmatantras, Yāmalatantras, and Śaktitantras.

=== Kulamārga ===
The Kulamārga preserves some of the distinctive features of the Kāpālika tradition, from which it is derived. It is subdivided into four subcategories of texts based on the goddesses Kuleśvarī, Kubjikā, Kālī and Tripurasundarī respectively. The Trika texts are closely related to the Kuleśvarī texts and can be considered as part of the Kulamārga.

== Worship ==
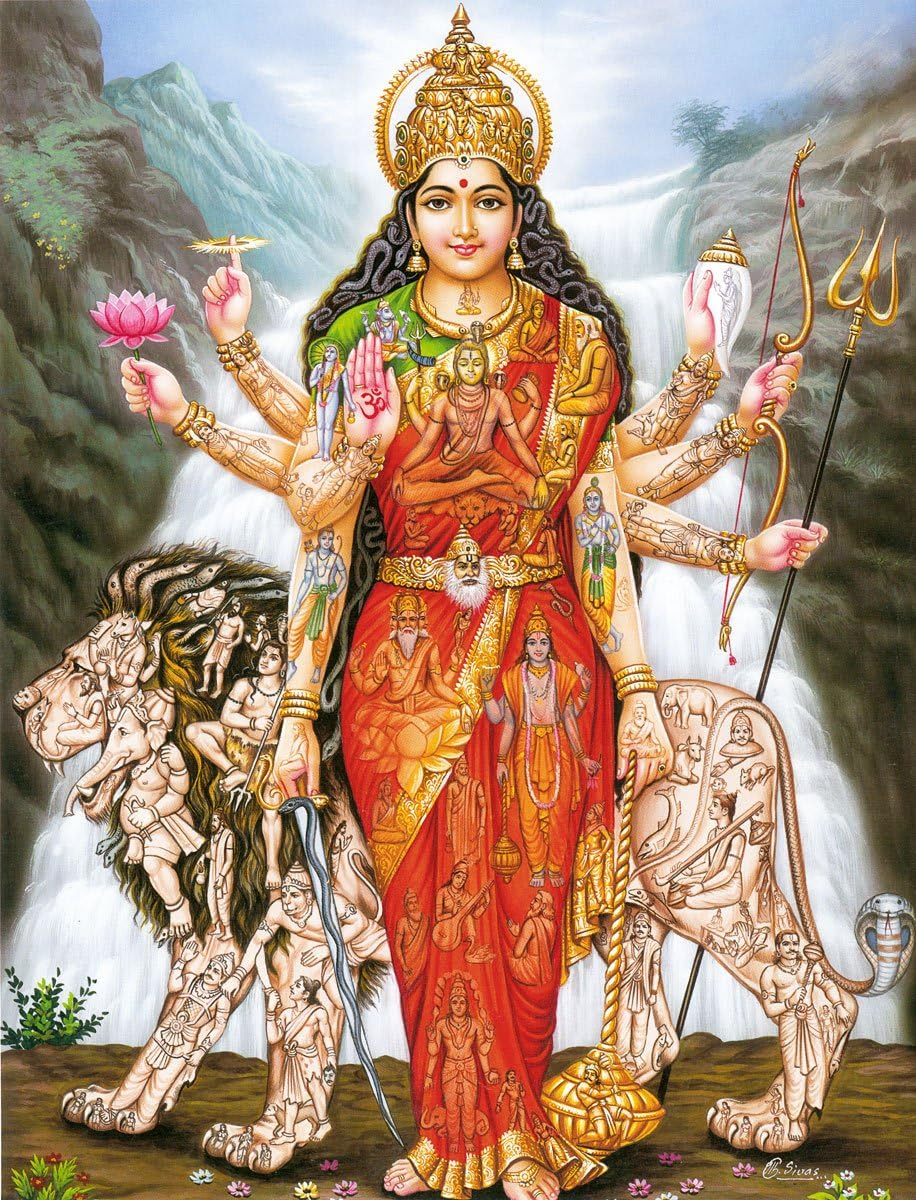
A modern depiction of the Divine Mother as the supreme divine ultimate reality encompassing all divinities.

Shaktism encompasses a nearly endless variety of beliefs and practices – from animism to philosophical speculation of the highest order – that seek to access the Shakti (Divine Energy or Power) that is believed to be the Devi's nature and form. Its two largest and most visible schools are the Srikula (family of Tripura Sundari), strongest in South India, and the Kalikula (family of Kali), which prevails in northern and eastern India.

=== Srikula: family of Lalita Tripura Sundari ===
The Srikula (family of Sri) tradition (sampradaya) focuses worship on Devi in the form of the goddess Lalita-Tripura Sundari. Rooted in first-millennium. Srikula became a force in South India no later than the seventh century, and is today the prevalent form of Shaktism practiced in South Indian regions such as Kerala, Tamil Nadu and Tamil areas of Sri Lanka.

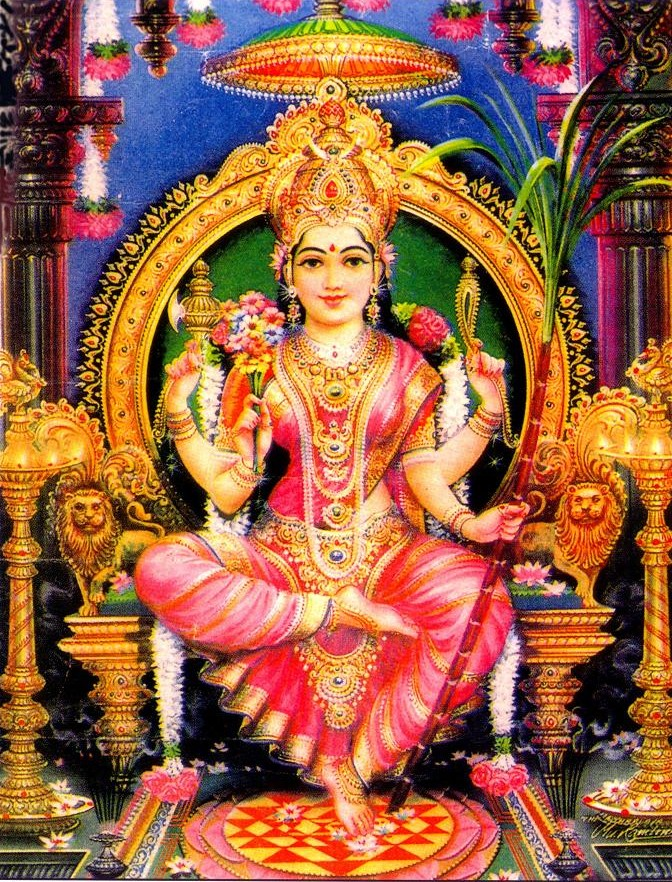
Sri Lalita-Tripurasundari enthroned with her left foot upon the Sri Chakra, holding her traditional symbols, the sugarcane bow, flower arrows, noose and goad

The Srikula's best-known school is Srividya, "one of Shakta Tantrism's most influential and theologically sophisticated movements." Its central symbol, the Sri Chakra, is probably the most famous visual image in all of Hindu Tantric tradition. Its literature and practice is perhaps more systematic than that of any other Shakta sect.

Srividya largely views the goddess as "benign [saumya] and beautiful [saundarya]" (in contrast to Kalikula's focus on "terrifying [ugra] and horrifying [ghora]" Goddess forms such as Kali or Durga). In Srikula practice, moreover, every aspect of the goddess – whether malignant or gentle – is identified with Lalita.

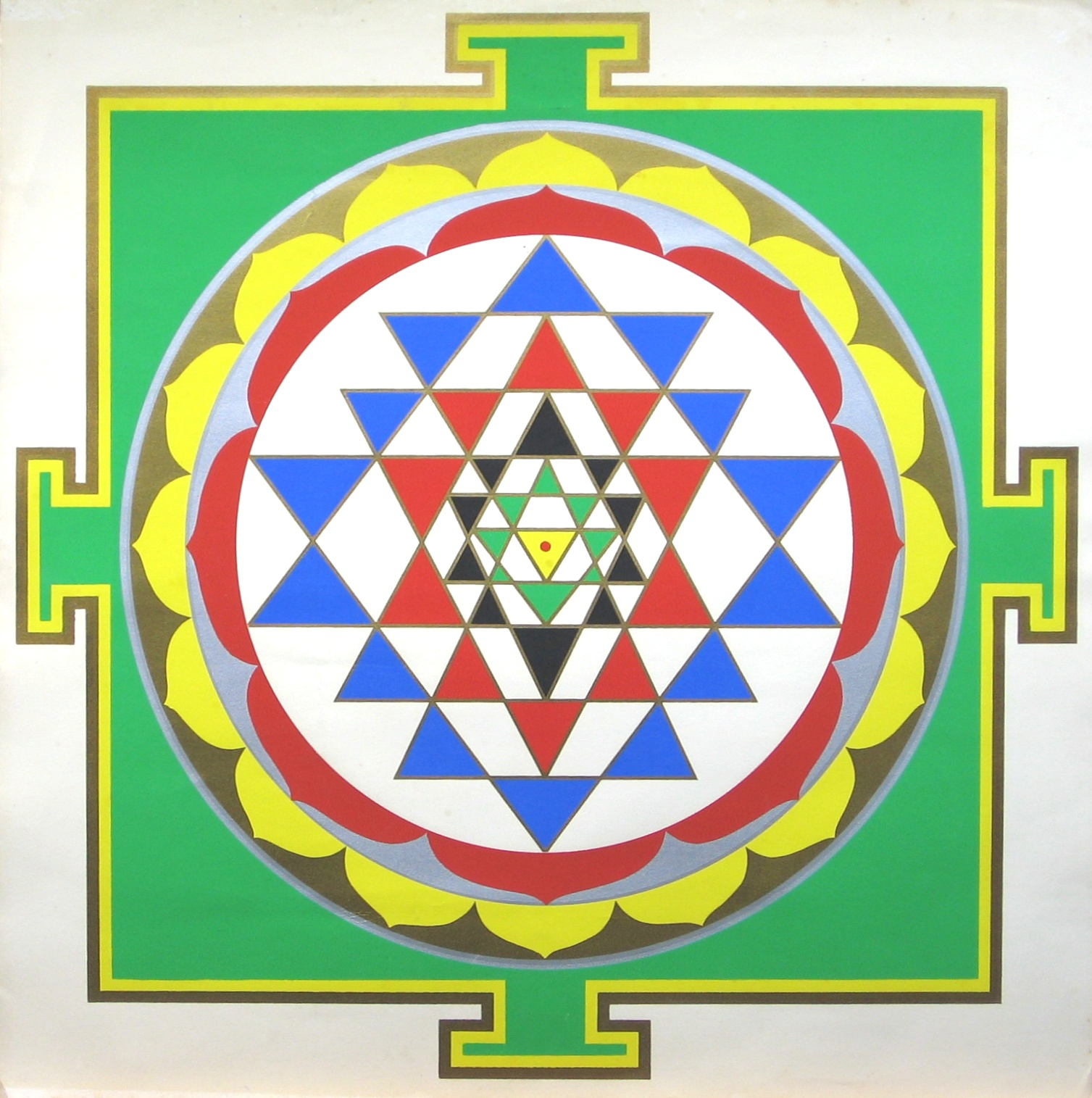
The Sri Chakra, also known as the Shri Yantra, is a mystical diagram used in Shaktism.

Srikula adepts most often worship Lalita using the abstract Sri Chakra yantra, which is regarded as her subtle form. The Sri Chakra can be visually rendered either as a two-dimensional diagram (whether drawn temporarily as part of the worship ritual, or permanently engraved in metal) or in the three-dimensional, pyramidal form known as the Sri Meru. It is not uncommon to find a Sri Chakra or Sri Meru installed in South Indian temples, because – as modern practitioners assert – "there is no disputing that this is the highest form of Devi and that some of the practice can be done openly. But what you see in the temples is not the srichakra worship you see when it is done privately." (Note: A senior member of Guru Mandali, Madurai, November 1984, cited in Brooks 1992.)

The Srividya paramparas can be further broadly subdivided into two streams, the Kaula (a vamamarga practice) and the Samaya (a dakshinamarga practice). The Kaula or Kaulachara, first appeared as a coherent ritual system in the 8th century in central India, and its most revered theorist is the 18th-century philosopher Bhaskararaya, widely considered "the best exponent of Shakta philosophy."

The Samaya or Samayacharya finds its roots in the work of the 16th-century commentator Lakshmidhara, and is "fiercely puritanical [in its] attempts to reform Tantric practice in ways that bring it in line with high-caste brahmanical norms." Many Samaya practitioners explicitly deny being either Shakta or Tantric, though scholars argues that their cult remains technically both. The Samaya-Kaula division marks "an old dispute within Hindu Tantrism".

=== Kalikula: family of Kali ===
The Kalikula (Family of Kali) form of Shaktism is most dominant in northeastern India, and is most widely prevalent in West Bengal, Assam, Kerala, Mithila, Uttar Pradesh, Bihar, Jharkhand, Chhattisgarh, Madhya Pradesh, Rajasthan, and Odisha and Nepal, and also previously in Kashmir (the Kaula tradition). The goddesses Kubjika, Kulesvari, Chamunda, Chandi, Shamshan Kali (goddess of the cremation ground), Dakshina Kali, and Siddheshwari are worshipped in the region of Bengal to protect against disease and smallpox as well as ill omens. Kalikula lineages focus upon the Devi as the source of wisdom (vidya) and liberation (moksha). The tantric part generally stands "in opposition to the brahmanic tradition," which they view as "overly conservative and denying the experiential part of religion."

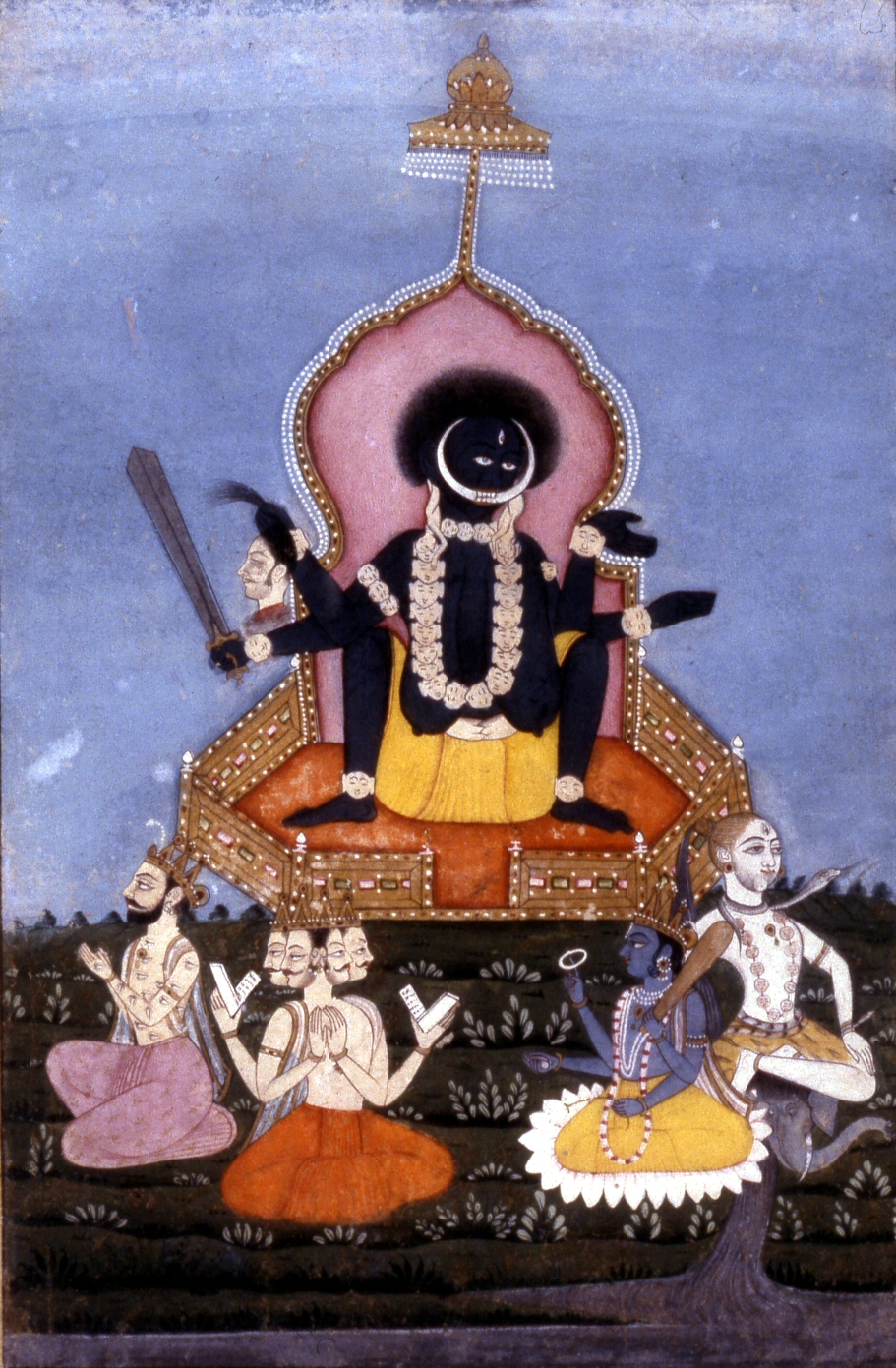
Kali as the supreme deity worshiped by Indra, Brahma, Vishnu and Shiva

The main deities of the Kalikula tradition are Kali, Chandi, Bheema and Durga. Other goddesses that enjoy veneration are Tara and all the other Mahavidyas, Kaumari as well as regional goddesses such as Manasa, the snake goddesses, Ṣaṣṭī, the protectress of children, Śītalā, the smallpox goddess, and Umā (the Vedic and Bangla Language name for Parvati) - all of them, again, considered aspects of the Divine Mother.

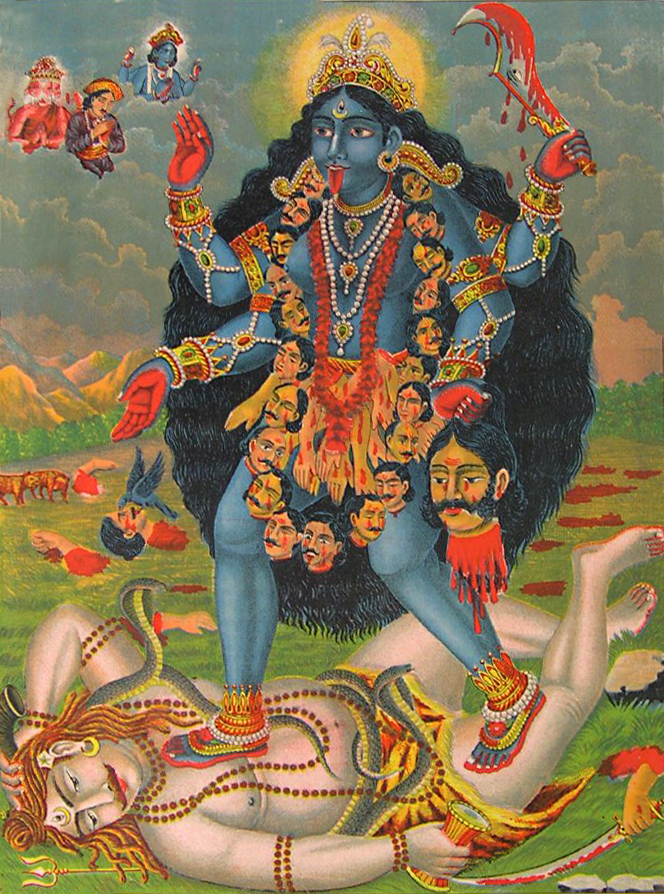
Kali in her Dakshina Kali form

In Nepal devi is mainly worshipped as the goddess Bhavani. She is one of the important Hindu deities in Nepal. Two major centres of Shaktism in West Bengal are Kalighat where the skull of Kali is believed to be worshipped along with her 25 forms. The kali ghat temple is located in Calcutta and Tarapith in Birbhum district. In Calcutta, emphasis is on devotion (bhakti) to the goddess as Kali. Where the goddess (Kali) is seen as the destroyer of evil;

She is "the loving mother who protects her children and whose fierceness guards them. She is outwardly frightening – with dark skin, pointed teeth, and a necklace of skulls – but inwardly beautiful. She can guarantee a good rebirth or great religious insight, and her worship is often communal – especially at festivals, such as Kali Puja and Durga Puja. Worship may involve contemplation of the devotee's union with or love of the goddess, visualization of her form, chanting [of her] mantras, prayer before her image or yantra, and giving [of] offerings."

At Tarapith, Devi's manifestation as Tara ("She Who Saves") or Ugratara ("Fierce Tara") is ascendant, as the goddess who gives liberation (kaivalyadayini). [...] The forms of sadhana performed here are more yogic and tantric than devotional, and they often involve sitting alone at the [cremation] ground, surrounded by ash and bone. There are shamanic elements associated with the Tarapith tradition, including "conquest of the Goddess, exorcism, trance, and control of spirits."

The philosophical and devotional underpinning of all such ritual, however, remains a pervasive vision of the Devi as supreme, absolute divinity. As expressed by the 19th-century saint Ramakrishna, one of the most influential figures in modern Bengali Shaktism:

Kali is none other than Brahman. That which is called Brahman is really Kali. She is the Primal Energy. When that Energy remains inactive, I call It Brahman, and when It creates, preserves, or destroys, I call It Shakti or Kali. What you call Brahman I call Kali. Brahman and Kali are not different. They are like fire and its power to burn: if one thinks of fire one must think of its power to burn. If one recognizes Kali one must also recognize Brahman; again, if one recognizes Brahman one must recognize Kali. Brahman and Its Power are identical. It is Brahman whom I address as Shakti or Kali.

=== Festivals ===
Shaktas celebrate most major Hindu festivals, as well as a huge variety of local, temple- or deity-specific observances. A few of the more important events are listed below:

==== Navaratri ====
The most important Shakta festival is Navaratri (lit. 'Festival of Nine Nights'), also known as "Sharad Navaratri" because it falls during the Hindu season of Sharad (September/October/November). This is the festival that worships the Navadurgas, forms of Devi. This festival – often taken together with the following tenth day, known as Dusshera or Vijayadashami – celebrates the goddess Durga's victory over a series of powerful demons described in the Devi Mahatmya. In Bengal, the last four days of Navaratri are called Durga Puja, and mark one episode in particular: Durga's iconic slaying of Mahishasura (lit., the "Buffalo Demon"). Durga Puja also became the main religio-cultural celebration within the Bengal diaspora in the West (together with Kali and Sarasvati Pujas, if a community enough big and rich).

While Hindus of all denominations celebrate the autumn Navratri festival, Shaktas also celebrate two additional Navratris – one in the spring and one in the summer. The spring festival is known as Vasanta Navaratri or Chaitra Navatri, and celebrated in the Hindu month of Chaitra (March/April). Srividya lineages dedicate this festival to Devi's form as the goddess Tripura Sundari. The summer festival is called Ashada Navaratri, as it is held during the Hindu month of Ashadha (June/July). The Vaishno Devi temple in Jammu, with Vaishno Devi considered an aspect of Durga, celebrates Navaratri. Ashada Navaratri, on the other hand, is considered particularly auspicious for devotees of the boar-headed Goddess Varahi, one of the seven Matrikas named in the Devi Mahatmya.

==== Vasant Panchami ====
Vasant Panchami is the most important festival dedicated to Goddess Saraswati, the consort of Lord Brahma and the goddess of arts, knowledge, and wisdom, who was a significant deity in Vedic India and embodies sound and speech. The festival is celebrated in late January or early February on the fifth day of spring, when devotees perform Saraswati Puja, and it is especially significant for students, writers, musicians, and other learners, who honour her with books, pens, and learning rituals. Young children often write on their first letters on this day.

==== Diwali and others ====
Lakshmi Puja is a part of Durga Puja celebrations by Shaktas, where Laksmi symbolises the goddess of abundance and autumn harvest. Lakshmi's biggest festival, however, is Diwali (or Deepavali; the "Festival of Lights"), a major Hindu holiday celebrated across India and in Nepal as Tihar. In North India, Diwali marks the beginning of the traditional New Year, and is held on the night of the new moon in the Hindu month of Kartik (usually October or November). Shaktas (and many non-Shaktas) celebrate it as another Lakshmi Puja, placing small oil lamps outside their homes and praying for the goddess's blessings. Diwali coincides with the celebration of Kali Puja, popular in Bengal, and some Shakta traditions focus their worship on Devi as Parvati rather than Lakshmi.

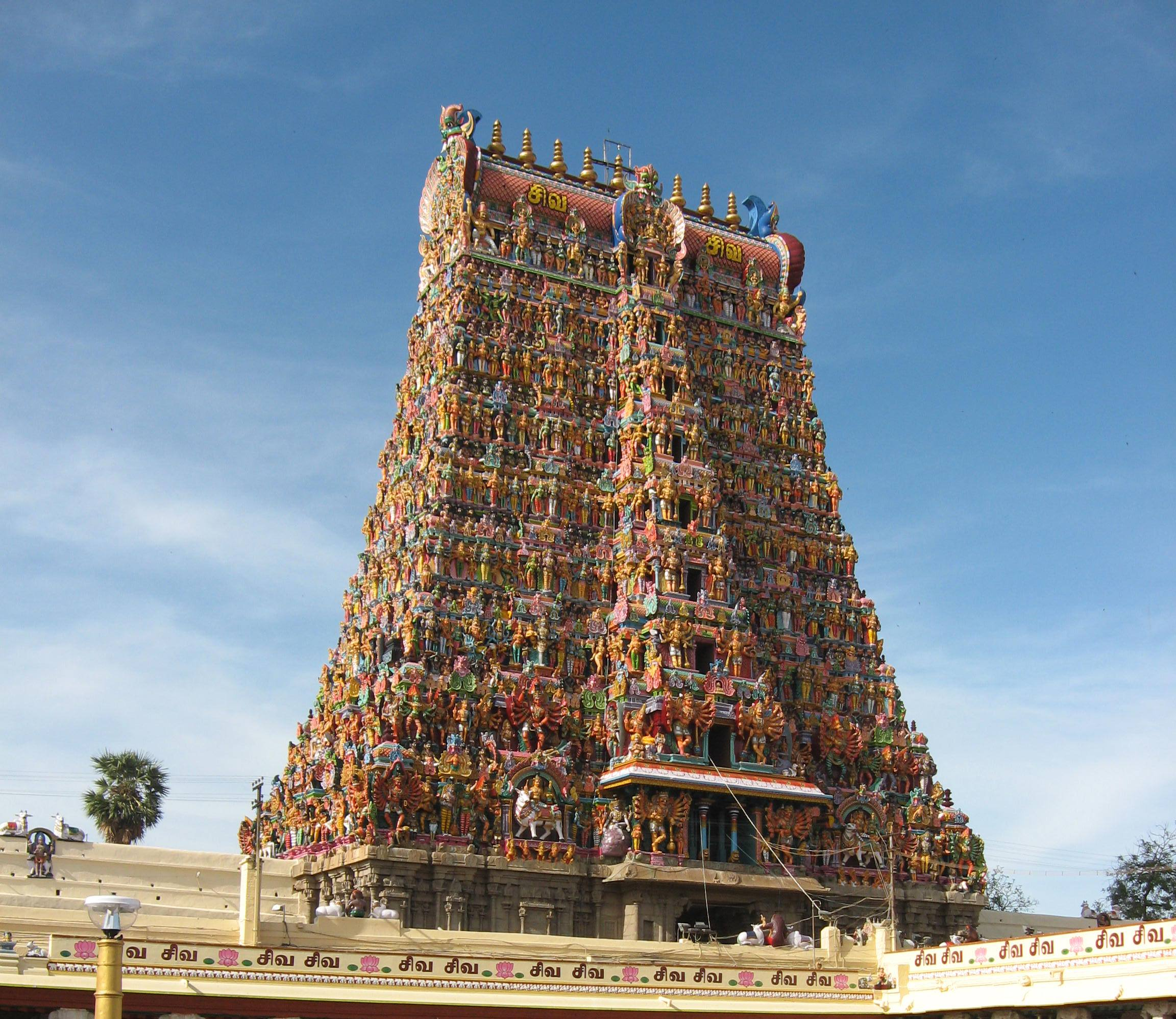
A gopuram (tower) of the Meenakshi Amman Temple, a Shakta temple at Madurai, Tamil Nadu, India

Major Shakta temple festivals are Meenakshi Kalyanam and Ambubachi Mela. The Meenakshi Kalyanam is a part of the Chithirai Thiruvizha festival in Madurai around April/May, one of the largest festivals in South India, celebrating the wedding of goddess Meenakshi (Parvati) and Shiva. The festival is one where both the Vaishnava and Shaiva communities join the celebrations, because Vishnu gives away his sister Parvati in marriage to Shiva.

Ambubachi Mela or Ameti is a celebration of the menstruation of the goddess, by hundreds of thousands of devotees, in a festival held in June/July (during the monsoon season) at Kamakhya Temple, Guwahati, Assam. Here the Devi is worshiped in the form of a yoni-like stone, and the site is one of Shakta Pitha or pilgrimage sites in Shaktism.

=== Animal sacrifice ===
Shakti tradition practices animal sacrifice to revere goddesses such as Kali in many parts of India but particularly in the eastern and Himalayan states of India and Nepal. This is either an actual animal, or a vegetable or sweet dish substitute considered equivalent to the animal. In many cases, Shakti devotees consider animal sacrifice distasteful, and practice alternate means of expressing devotion while respecting the views of others in their tradition.

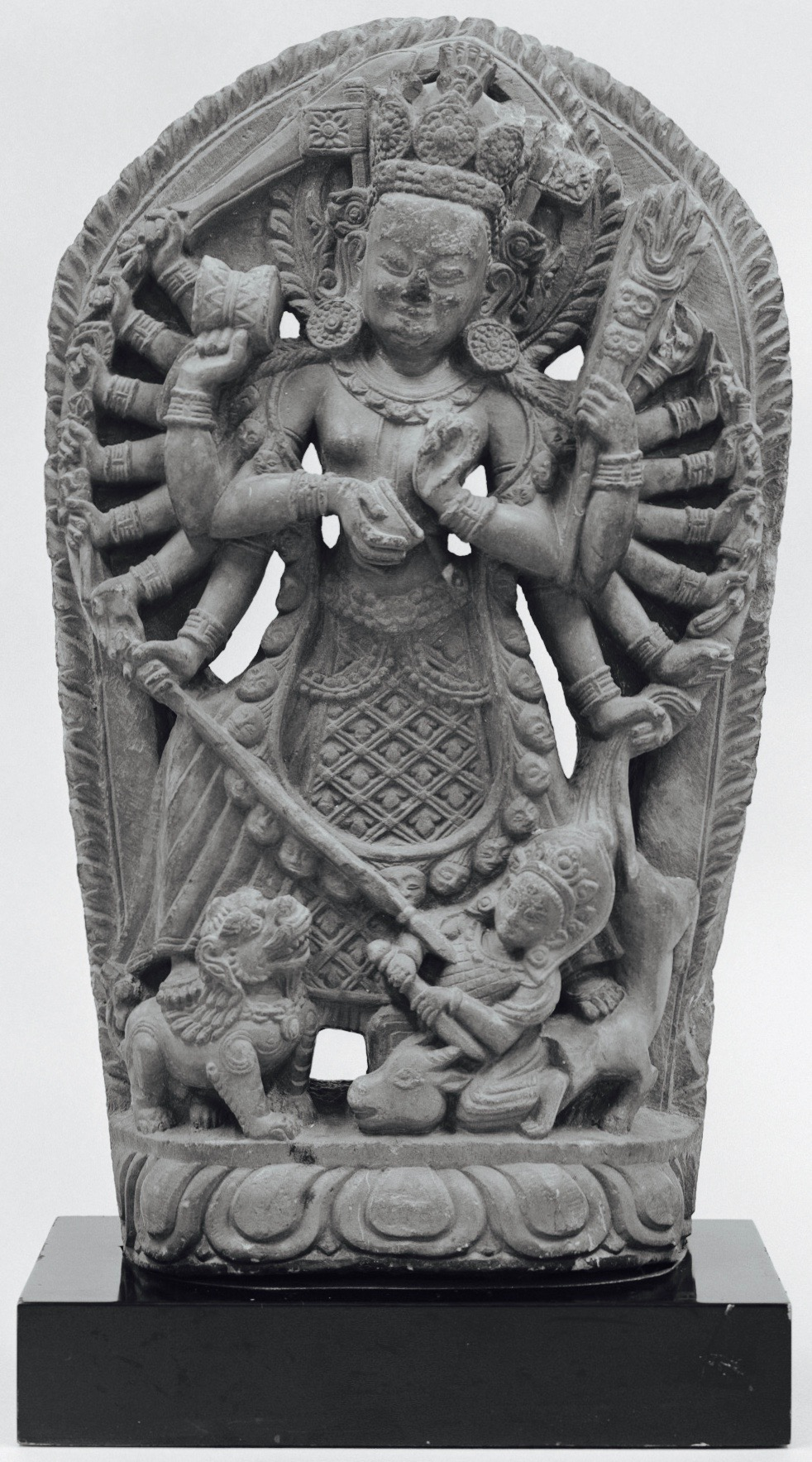
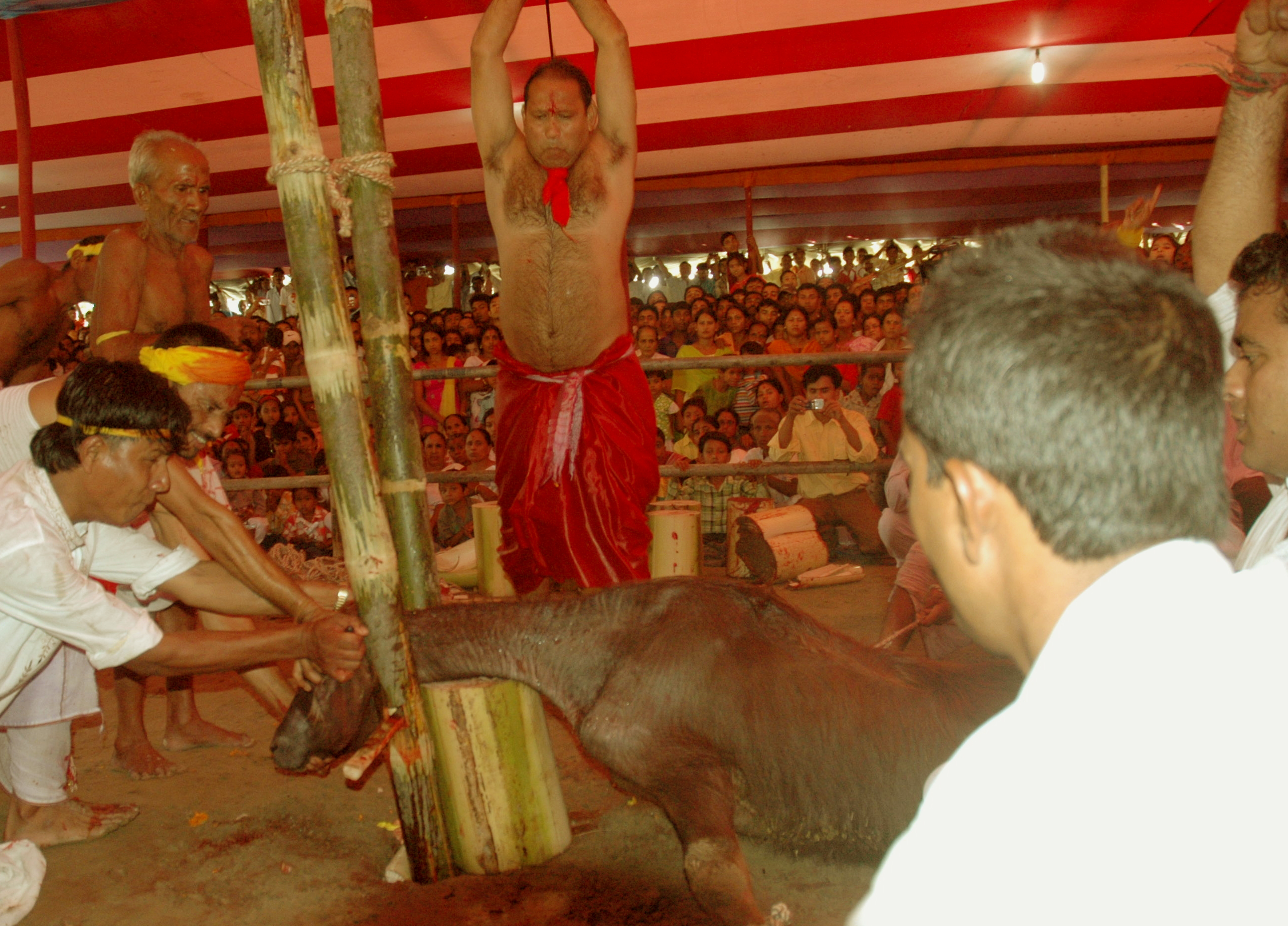
In Shakti mythology, Durga slays an evil buffalo demon (left, 18th century statue). Right: A buffalo about to be sacrificed by a villager during Durga puja festival. The buffalo sacrifice practice, however, is rare in contemporary India.

In Nepal, West Bengal, Odisha, Assam, Bihar and Jharkhand, animal sacrifices are performed at Shakti temples, particularly to mark the legend of goddess Durga slaying the buffalo demon. This involves slaying of a goat or a male water buffalo. Animal sacrifice is also an essential component as part of the Kaula tantra school of Shaktism. This practice is rare among Hindus, outside this region.

In Bengal, the animal sacrifice ritual follows the guidelines as seen in texts such as Mahanirvana Tantra. This ritual includes selecting the animal, then a priest offers a prayer to the animal, then recites the Gayatri Mantra in its ear before killing it. The meat of the sacrificed animal is then cooked and eaten by the Shakta devotees.

In Nepal, animal sacrifice en masse occurs during the three-day-long Gadhimai festival. In 2009 it was speculated that more than 250,000 animals were sacrificed during this event.

In Odisha, during the Bali Jatra, Shakti devotees sacrifice male goats to the goddess Samaleswari in her temple in Sambalpur, Orissa.

The Rajput of Rajasthan worship their weapons and horses on Navratri, and formerly offered a sacrifice of a goat to a goddess revered as Kuldevi – a practice that continues in some places. The ritual requires slaying of the animal with a single stroke. In the past this ritual was considered a rite of passage into manhood and readiness as a warrior. The ritual is directed by a priest. The Kuldevi among these Rajput communities is a warrior-pativrata guardian goddess, with local legends tracing reverence for her during Rajput-Muslim wars.

Animal sacrifice of a buffalo or goat, particularly during smallpox epidemics, has been practiced in parts of South India. The sacrificed animal is dedicated to a goddess, and is probably related to the myth of goddess Kali in Andhra Pradesh, but in Karnataka, the typical goddess is Renuka. According to Alf Hiltebeitel – a professor of Religions, History and Human Sciences, these ritual animal sacrifices, with some differences, mirrors goddess - related ritual animal sacrifice found in Gilgamesh epic and in texts of Egyptian, Minoan and Greek sources.

In the 19th century through the early 20th century, Indian labourers were shipped by the British Empire into colonial mining and plantations operations in the Indian ocean and the Caribbean regions. These included a significant amount of Shakta devotees. While instances of Shakta animal sacrifice during Kali puja in the Caribbean islands were recorded between 1850s to 1920s, these were relatively uncommon when compared to other rituals such as temple prayers, community dancing and fire walking.

== Shaktism versus other Hindu traditions ==
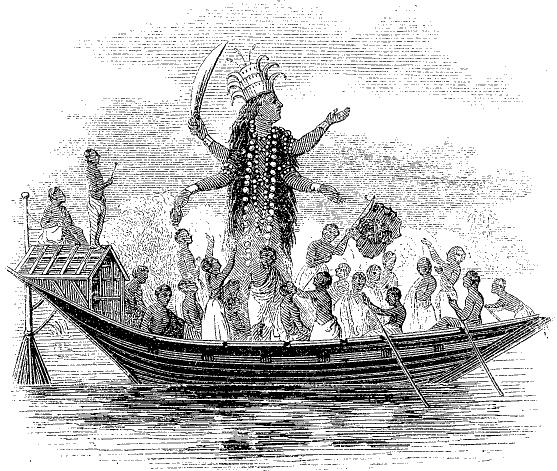
"The Hindoo Goddess Kali", an illustration from Dr. Scudder's Tales for Little Readers About the Heathen, by Dr. John Scudder (London, 1849)

The tantra practices are secretive, subject to speculations and criticism. Scholars variously attribute such criticism to ignorance, misunderstanding or sectarian bias on the part of some observers, as well as unscrupulous practices by some Shaktas. These are some of the reasons many Hindus question the relevance and historicity of Tantra to their tradition. The emphasis in Shaktism that love of the deity is more important than obedience shows an influence of the Vaishnavaite idea of passionate relationship between Radha and Krishna as an ideal bhava. Similarly, Shaktism influenced Vaishnavism and Shaivism. The goddess is considered the consort and energy (shakti) of the gods Vishnu and Shiva; they have their individual shaktis, Vaishnavi for Vishnu and Maheshvari for Shiva, and consorts Lakshmi and Sati/Parvati.

Beyond tantra, the Shakta sub-traditions subscribe to various philosophies, are similar in some aspects and differ in others. These traditions compare with Vaishnavism, Shaivism and Smartism as follows:

Comparison of Shaktism with other traditions
| | Vaishnava Traditions | Shaiva Traditions | Shakta Traditions | Smarta Traditions | References |
|---|---|---|---|---|---|
| Scriptural authority | Vedas and Upanishads | Vedas and Upanishads | Vedas, Upanishads and Tantras | Vedas and Upanishads | |
| Supreme deity | God Vishnu | God Shiva | Goddess Devi | None | |
| Creator | Vishnu | Shiva | Devi | Brahman principle | |
| Avatar | Key concept | Minor | Significant | Minor | |
| Monastic life | Accepts | Recommends | Accepts | Recommends | |
| Rituals, Bhakti | Affirms | Affirms | Affirms | Optional | |
| Ahimsa and Vegetarianism | Affirms | Recommends, Optional | Optional | Recommends, recommends Optional | |
| Free will, Maya, Karma | Affirms | Affirms | Affirms | Affirms | |
| Metaphysics | Brahman (Vishnu) and Atman (Soul, Self) | Brahman (Shiva), Atman | Brahman (Devi), Atman | Brahman, Atman | |
| Epistemology (Pramana) | 1. Perception; 2. Inference; 3. Reliable testimony | 1. Perception; 2. Inference; 3. Reliable testimony 4. Self-evident | 1. Perception; 2. Inference; 3. Reliable testimony | 1. Perception; 2. Inference; 3. Comparison and analogy 4. Postulation, derivation 5. Negative/cognitive proof 6. Reliable testimony | |
| Philosophy | Dvaita, qualified advaita, advaita, Visishtadvaita | Dvaita, qualified advaita, advaita | Shakti-advaita, Samkhya | Advaita | |
| Salvation (Soteriology) | Videhamukti, Yoga, champions householder life | Jivanmukta, Charya-Kriyā-Yoga-Jnana | Bhakti, Tantra, Yoga | Jivanmukta, Advaita, Yoga, champions monastic life | |

== Demography ==
There is no census data available on demographic history or trends for Shaktism or other traditions within Hinduism. Estimates vary on the relative number of adherents in Shaktism compared to other traditions of Hinduism. According to a 2010 estimate by Johnson and Grim, the Shaktism tradition is the smaller group with about 30 million or 3.2% of Hindus. According to a 2020 estimate by the World Religion Database (WRD), hosted at Boston University’s Institute on Culture, Religion and World Affairs (CURA), Shaktism is the third largest Hindu sect, constituting about 305 million Hindus.

Adherents of Shaktism are referred to as Shaktas. Large shakta communities are particularly found in eastern states, such as West Bengal, Assam, Bihar, Odisha, Jharkhand and Tripura with substantial communities also existing in Punjab, Jammu, Himachal Pradesh, Uttarakhand, Gujarat and Central India. In West Bengal Shaktas belong to the upper castes as well as lowest castes and tribes, while the lower middle castes are Vaishnavas.

Gavin Flood states that Shaivism and Shaktism traditions are difficult to separate, as many Shaiva Hindus revere the goddess Shakti regularly. The denominations of Hinduism, states Julius Lipner, are unlike those found in major religions of the world, because Hindu denominations are fuzzy with individuals revering gods and goddesses henotheistically, with many Shaiva and Vaishnava adherents recognising Sri (Lakshmi), Parvati, Saraswati and other aspects of the goddess Devi. Similarly, Shakta Hindus revere Shiva and goddesses such as Parvati (such as Durga, Radha, Sita and others) and Saraswati important in Shaiva and Vaishnava traditions.

North Malabar, Kashmir, Bengal, and Tripura are the regions in India where Shaktism was historically worshipped in its core and most distinctive form. In 1909, Edgar Thurston wrote that in North Malabar, the Thiyyar are the primary practitioners of Shaktism (Shaktheyam). In every tara (village), there is a Bhagavati temple for Thiyyar where they officiate as priests. The Komaram (oracle) of the Bhagavati temple is clothed in red and embellished with red sandalwood paste mixed with turmeric. Thurston also noted that Sakti worship is perhaps more peculiarly theirs than any other group's owing to their ability to use arrack, a product of the palm. A Thiyyar can achieve the highest form of Shaktheyam in Malabar through the ritual use of arrack, whereas a Brahmin cannot. The Sakti goddess, Bhagavati, is regarded by the Thiyyar as their guardian spirit.

== Temples and influence ==
The map depicts location of Shakta pithas in South Asia, major (blue) and minor (red).

Shakta temples are found all over South Asia. Many towns, villages and geographic landmarks are named for various forms of the Devi. Major pilgrimage sites of Shaktism are called "Shakta pithas", literally "Seats of the Devi". These vary from 4 to 51.

Some Shakta temples are also found in Southeast Asia, the Americas, Europe, Australia and elsewhere. Examples in the United States include the Kali Mandir in Laguna Beach, California; and Sri Rajarajeswari Peetam, a Srividya temple in rural Rush, New York.

Some feminists and participants in New Age spirituality who are attracted to Goddess worship", suggest Shaktism is a "symbol of wholeness and healing, associated especially with repressed female power and sexuality."

=== Buddhism ===
There has been a significant sharing of ideas, ritual grammar and concepts between Tantric Buddhism (Vajrayana tradition) found in Nepal and Tibet and the Tantric Shakta tradition of Hinduism. Both movements cherish female deities. According to Miranda Shaw, "the confluence of Buddhism and Shaktism is such that Tantric Buddhism could properly be called Shakta Buddhism".

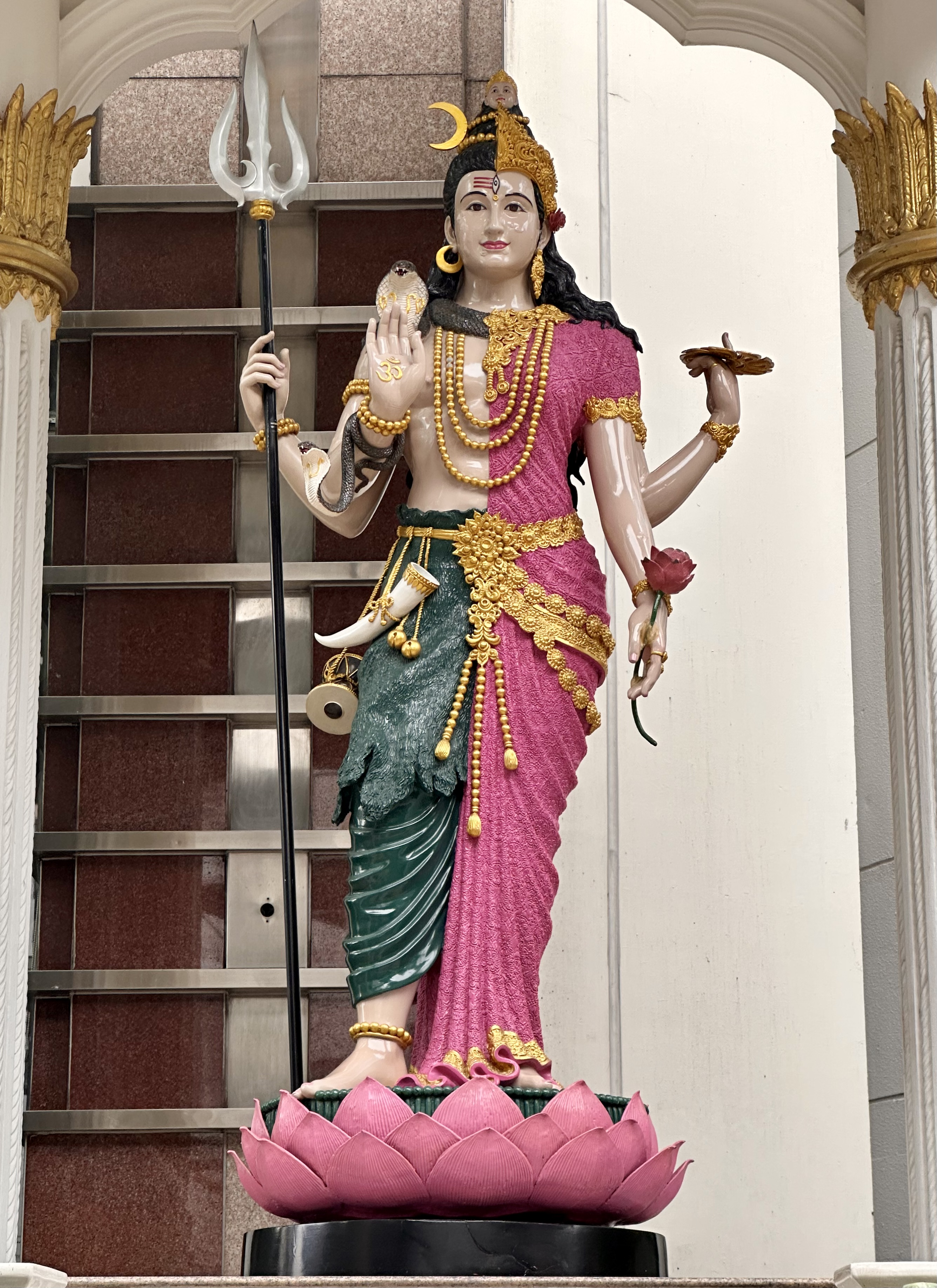
Ardhanarishvara in Southeast-Asia (Bangkok)

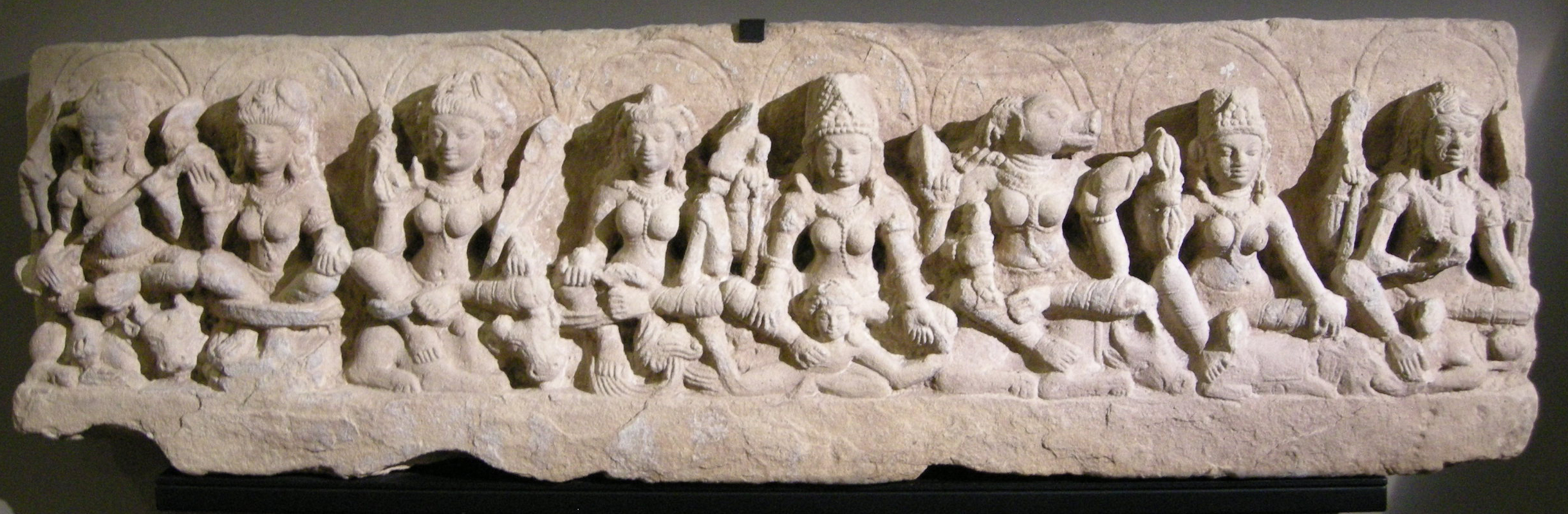
Matrika – mother goddesses – are found in both Shakta-Hinduism and Vajrayana-Buddhism.

The Buddhist Aurangabad Caves about 100 kilometers from the Ellora Caves, dated to the 6th to 7th century CE, show Buddhist Matrikas (mother goddesses of Shaktism) next to the Buddha. Other goddesses in these caves include Durga. The goddess iconography in these Buddhist caves is close, but not identical to the Hindu Shakta tradition. The "seven Goddess mothers" are found in other Buddhist caves and literature, such as their discussion in the Buddhist text Manjusrimulakalpa and Vairocanabhisambodhi.

=== Jainism ===
In Jainism, ideas similar to Shaktism tradition are found, such as the Vidyadevis and the Shasanadevis.

=== Sikhism ===
The secondary scripture of Sikhs, Dasam Granth attributed to Guru Gobind Singh, includes numerous sections on Shakta goddesses, particularly Chandi – the fierce warrior form of the Hindu goddess. According to Nikky-Guninder Kaur Singh – a professor of Religious Studies, the stories about goddess Durga in the Dasam Granth are reworkings of ancient Shakti mythologies. A significant part of this Sikh scripture is based on the teachings in the Shakta text Devi Mahatmya found in the Markandeya Purana of Hinduism.

== See also ==
- Palden Lhamo – Female Tibetan Buddhist deity
- Tridevi – Trinity of chief goddesses in Hinduism
- Caribbean Shaktism

== Sources ==
=== Books and Journals ===
- Bhattacharyya, N. N. (1996) [1974]. History of the Sakta Religion (2nd ed.). New Delhi: Munshiram Manoharlal Publishers.
- Brooks, Douglas Renfrew (1990). The Secret of the Three Cities: An Introduction to Hindu Shakta Tantrism. Chicago: The University of Chicago Press. ISBN 978-0-226-07569-3.
- Brooks, Douglas Renfrew (1992). Auspicious Wisdom: The Texts and Traditions of Srividya Shakta Tantrism in South India. Albany: State University of New York Press. ISBN 978-0-7914-1146-9.
- Brown, C. MacKenzie (1990). The Triumph of the Goddess: The Canonical Models and Theological Issues of the Devi-Bhagavata Purana. SUNY Series in Hindu Studies. State University of New York Press. ISBN 978-0-7914-0364-8.
- Brancaccio, Pia (2010). The Buddhist Caves at Aurangabad: Transformations in Art and Religion. Brill Academic. ISBN 978-90-04-18525-8.
- Brown, Cheever Mackenzie (1998). The Devi Gita: The Song of the Goddess: A Translation, Annotation, and Commentary. Albany: State University of New York Press. ISBN 978-0-7914-3939-5.
- Coburn, Thomas B. (1991). Encountering the Goddess: A translation of the Devi-Mahatmya and a Study of Its Interpretation. State University of New York Press. ISBN 0791404463.
- Coburn, Thomas B. (2002). Devī Māhātmya, The Crystallization of the Goddess Tradition. South Asia Books. ISBN 81-208-0557-7.
- Cush, Denise; et al. (2007). Encyclopedia of Hinduism. Routledge. ISBN 978-0700712670.
- Dasgupta, S (1996). Journal of the Indian Musicological Society. Vol. 27–28. Indian Musicological Society.
- Dempsey, Corinne G. (2006). The Goddess Lives in Upstate New York: Breaking Convention and Making Home at a North American Hindu Temple. New York: Oxford University Press.
- Dikshitar, V. R. Ramachandra (1999) [1942]. The Lalita Cult. Delhi: Motilal Banarsidass.
- Dhavamony, Mariasusai (1999). Hindu Spirituality. Gregorian Press. ISBN 978-88-7652-818-7.
- Dhavamony, Mariasusai (2002). Hindu-Christian Dialogue: Theological Soundings and Perspectives. Rodopi. ISBN 90-420-1510-1.
- Deutsche, Eliott (2000). Perrett, Roy (ed.). Philosophy of Religion : Indian Philosophy Vol 4. Routledge. ISBN 978-0815336112.
- Deussen, Paul (1980). Sixty Upaniṣads of the Veda, Part 1. Motilal Banarsidass. ISBN 978-81-208-1468-4.
- Dalal, Roshen (2010). The Religions of India: A Concise Guide to Nine Major Faiths. Penguin Books. ISBN 978-0-14-341517-6.
- Dalal, Roshen (2014). Hinduism: An Alphabetical Guide. Penguin UK. ISBN 9788184752779.
- Eng, Lai Ah (2008). Religious Diversity in Singapore. Institute of Southeast Asian Studies, Singapore. ISBN 978-981-230-754-5.
- Elsberg, Constance Waeber (2003). Graceful Women: Gender and Identity in an American Sikh Community. University of Tennessee Press. ISBN 978-1-57233-214-0.
- Fuller, Christopher John (2004). The camphor flame: popular Hinduism and society in India (Revised and Expanded ed.). Princeton University Press. ISBN 978-0-691-12048-5.
- Flood, Gavin (2008). The Blackwell Companion to Hinduism. John Wiley & Sons. ISBN 978-0-470-99868-7.
- Flood, Gavin D. (1996). An Introduction to Hinduism. Cambridge University Press. ISBN 978-0-521-43878-0.
- Frazier, J. (2013). "Bhakti in Hindu Cultures". The Journal of Hindu Studies. 6 (2). Oxford University Press: 101–113. doi:10.1093/jhs/hit028.
- Foulston, Lynn; Abbott, Stuart (2009). Hindu Goddesses: Beliefs and Practices. Sussex Academic Press. ISBN 978-1-902210-43-8.
- Grimes, John A. (1996). A Concise Dictionary of Indian Philosophy: Sanskrit Terms Defined in English. State University of New York Press. ISBN 978-0791430675.
- Gray, David B.; Overbey, Ryan Richard (2016). Tantric Traditions in Transmission and Translation. Oxford University Press. ISBN 978-0-19-990952-0.
- Gonda, Jan (1970). Visnuism and Sivaism: A Comparison. Bloomsbury Academic. ISBN 978-1-4742-8080-8.
- Gupta, Sanjukta (2013). Advaita Vedanta and Vaisnavism: The Philosophy of Madhusudana Sarasvati. Routledge. ISBN 978-1-134-15774-7.
- Greenberg, Yudit Kornberg (2008). Encyclopedia of Love in World Religions. ABC-CLIO. ISBN 978-1-85109-980-1.
- Harlan, Lindsey (1992). Religion and Rajput Women. Berkeley, California: University of California Press. ISBN 0-520-07339-8.
- Hiltebeitel, Alf; Erndl, Kathleen M. (2000). Is the Goddess a Feminist?: the Politics of South Asian Goddesses. New York University Press. ISBN 978-0-8147-3619-7.
- Hiltebeitel, Alf (February 1980). "Rāma and Gilgamesh: the sacrifices of the water buffalo and the bull of heaven". History of Religions. 19 (3): 187–223. doi:10.1086/462845. JSTOR 1062467. S2CID 162925746.
- Hurley, Leigh; Hurley, Phillip (2012). Tantra, Yoga of Ecstasy: the Sadhaka's Guide to Kundalinin and the Left-Hand Path. Maithuna Publications. ISBN 9780983784722.
- Harlan, Lindsey (2003). The goddesses' henchmen gender in Indian hero worship. Oxford [u.a.]: Oxford University Press. ISBN 978-0195154269.
- Harper, Katherine Anne; Brown, Robert L. (2012). The Roots of Tantra. State University of New York Press. ISBN 978-0-7914-8890-4.
- Johnston, Charles (2014). The Mukhya Upanishads: Books of Hidden Wisdom, (1920–1931) (PDF) (reprint ed.). Kshetra Books. ISBN 978-1-4959-4653-0. Archived from the original (PDF) on 20 January 2022.
- Johnson, Todd M; Grim, Brian J (2013). The World's Religions in Figures: An Introduction to International Religious Demography. John Wiley & Sons. ISBN 9781118323038. Archived from the original on 9 December 2019. Chapter 1: Global Religious Populations Archived 20 October 2013 at the Wayback Machine
- Jones, Constance; Ryan, James D. (2006). Encyclopedia of Hinduism. Infobase Publishing. ISBN 978-0-8160-7564-5.
- Jones, Constance; Ryan, James (2014). Encyclopedia of Hinduism. Infobase Publishing. ISBN 978-0816054589.
- Katznelson, Ira; Jones, Gareth Stedman (2010). Religion and the Political Imagination. Cambridge University Press. ISBN 978-1-139-49317-8.
- Kemmerer, Lisa; Nocella, Anthony J. (2011). Call to Compassion: Reflections on Animal Advocacy from the World's Religions. Lantern. ISBN 978-1-59056-281-9.
- Kali, Davadatta (2003). In Praise of the Goddess: The Devimahatmya and Its Meaning. Berwick, ME: Nicolas-Hays. ISBN 8120829530.
- Kinsley, David (1987). Hindu Goddesses: Visions of the Divine Feminine in the Hindu Religious Tradition. Motilal Banarsidass. ISBN 978-81-208-0394-7.
- Kinsley, David (1998). Tantric Visions of the Divine Feminine: The Ten Mahavidyas. Motilal Banarsidass. ISBN 978-81-208-1523-0.
- Krishna Warrier, A. J. (1999) [1967]. The Sākta Upaniṣads. The Adyar Library and Research Center, Library Series. Vol. 89 (3rd. ed.). Chennai: Vasanta Press.
- Keul, István (2012). Transformations and Transfer of Tantra in Asia and Beyond. Walter de Gruyter. ISBN 978-3-11-025811-0.
- Klostermaier, Klaus K. (2010). A Survey of Hinduism (third ed.). State University of New York Press. ISBN 978-0-7914-8011-3.
- Kenoyer, J.M.; Clark, J.D.; Pal, J.N.; Sharma, G.R. (1983). An upper paleolithic shrine in India? (PDF). Archived from the original (PDF) on 11 November 2023.
- Lipner, Julius J. (2009). Hindus: Their Religious Beliefs and Practices (2nd ed.). Routledge. ISBN 978-0-415-45677-7.
- McDermott, Rachel Fell (1998). "The Western Kali". In Hawley, John; Wulff, Donna Marie (eds.). Devi: Goddesses of India. Motilal Banarsidass. ISBN 978-81-208-1491-2.
- McDermott, Rachel Fell (2005). "Bengali religions". In Lindsay Jones (ed.). Encyclopedia of Religion: 15 Volume Set. Vol. 2 (2nd ed.). Detroit, Mi: MacMillan Reference USA. pp. 824–832. ISBN 0-02-865735-7.
- McDermott, Rachel Fell (2011). Revelry, Rivalry, and Longing for the Goddesses of Bengal: The Fortunes of Hindu Festivals. Columbia University Press. ISBN 978-0-231-12919-0.
- Munavalli, Somashekar (2007). Lingayat Dharma (Veerashaiva Religion) (PDF). Veerashaiva Samaja of North America. Archived from the original (PDF) on 26 June 2013.
- McDaniel, June (2004). Offering Flowers, Feeding Skulls. Oxford University Press. ISBN 978-0-19-534713-5.
- Monaghan, Patricia (2011). Goddesses in World Culture. ABC-CLIO. ISBN 978-0-313-35465-6.
- Melton, J. Gordon; Baumann, Martin (2010). Religions of the World: A Comprehensive Encyclopedia of Beliefs and Practices (second ed.). ABC-CLIO. ISBN 978-1-59884-204-3.
- Maharaj, Ayon (2020). "Panentheistic Cosmopsychism: Swami Vivekananda's Sāṃkhya-Vedāntic Solution to the Hard Problem of Consciousness". In Göcke, Benedikt Paul; Brüntrup, Godehard; Jaskolla, Ludwig (eds.). Panentheism and Panpsychism. Brill. pp. 273–301. doi:10.30965/9783957437303_015. ISBN 978-3-95743-171-4.
- Nikhilananda, Swami (trans.) (2000) [1942]. The Gospel of Sri Ramakrishna (9th ed.). New York: Ramakrishna-Vivekananda Center.
- Olivelle, Patrick (1992). The Samnyasa Upanisads. Oxford University Press. ISBN 978-0195070453.
- Ooi, Keat Gin (2004). Southeast Asia: A Historical Encyclopedia, from Angkor Wat to East Timor. ABC-CLIO. ISBN 978-1-57607-770-2.
- Pattanaik, Devdutt (2000). Devi the Mother-Goddess: An Introduction. Mumbai: Vakils, Feffer and Simons Ltd.
- Pintchman, Tracy (2014). Seeking Mahadevi: Constructing the Identities of the Hindu Great Goddess. State University of New York Press. ISBN 978-0-7914-9049-5.
- Pintchman, Tracy (2015). The Rise of the Goddess in the Hindu Tradition. State University of New York Press. ISBN 978-1-4384-1618-2.
- Pfeffer, Georg; Behera, Deepak Kumar (1997). Contemporary Society: Developmental issues, transition, and change. Concept Publishing Company. ISBN 9788170226420.
- Partridge, Christopher (2013). Introduction to World Religions. Fortress Press. ISBN 978-0-8006-9970-3.
- Phillips, Stephen H (1995). Classical Indian Metaphysics. Columbia University Press. ISBN 978-0812692983.
- Prakash, Prem (1998). The Yoga of Spiritual Devotion: A Modern Translation of the Narada Bhakti Sutras. Inner Traditions. ISBN 978-0-89281-664-4.
- Prasad, Rajendra (2008). A Conceptual-analytic Study of Classical Indian Philosophy of Morals. Concept. ISBN 978-81-8069-544-5.
- Rocher, Ludo (1986). The Puranas. Otto Harrassowitz Verlag. ISBN 978-3447025225.
- Roberts, Peter Alan (2011). Mahamudra and Related Instructions: Core Teachings of the Kagyu Schools. Simon and Schuster. ISBN 978-0-86171-444-5.
- Rinehart, Robin (2011). Debating the Dasam Granth. Oxford University Press. ISBN 978-0-19-984247-6.
- Rigopoulos, Antonio (1998). Dattatreya: The Immortal Guru, Yogin, and Avatara: A Study of the Transformative and Inclusive Character of a Multi-faceted Hindu Deity. State University of New York Press. ISBN 978-0-7914-3696-7.
- Subramuniyaswami, Satguru Sivaya (2002) [1999]. Merging with Siva: Hinduism's Contemporary Metaphysics (2nd ed.). Hawaii: Himalayan Academy. ISBN 978-0-945497-99-8.
- Simoons, Frederick J. (1998). Plants of Life, Plants of Death. University of Wisconsin Press. ISBN 978-0-299-15904-7.
- Samuel, Geoffrey (2010). Tantric Revisionings. Motilal Banarsidass. ISBN 978-8120827523.
- Sivaraman, K. (1973). Śaivism in Philosophical Perspective. Motilal Banarsidass. ISBN 978-81-208-1771-5.
- Skoog, Kim (1996). Andrew O. Fort; Patricia Y. Mumme (eds.). Living Liberation in Hindu Thought. SUNY Press. ISBN 978-0-7914-2706-4.
- Sharma, Arvind (2000). Classical Hindu Thought: An Introduction. Oxford University Press. ISBN 978-0-19-564441-8.
- Saxena, N. B. (2012). Fulkerson, Mary McClintock; Briggs, Sheila (eds.). The Oxford Handbook of Feminist Theology. Oxford University Press. ISBN 978-0-19-927388-1.
- Singh, Pashaura; Fenech, Louis E. (2014). The Oxford Handbook of Sikh Studies. Oxford University Press. ISBN 978-0-19-969930-8.
- Sanderson, Alexis (2014) [2012–2013]. "The Śaiva Literature" (PDF). Journal of Indological Studies (24 & 25). Kyoto. Archived from the original (PDF) on 4 March 2016.
- Singh, Akhileshwar (10 April 2018). "Goddess Durga: Origin, iconography and mythology" (PDF). International Journal of Applied Social Science. 5 (5).
- Taylor, Patrick; Case, Frederick (2013). The Encyclopedia of Caribbean Religions: Volume 1: A - L. University of Illinois Press. ISBN 978-0-252-09433-0.
- Urban, Hugh (1997). "Elitism and Esotericism: Strategies of Secrecy and Power in South Indian Tantra and French Freemasonry". Numen. 44 (1): 1–38. doi:10.1163/1568527972629894.
- Wadley, Susan Snow (2004). Raja Nal and the Goddess: The North Indian Epic Dhola in Performance. Indiana University Press. ISBN 0-253-11127-7.
- White, David Gordon (2003). Kiss of the Yogini: "Tantric Sex" in its South Asian Contexts. Chicago: University of Chicago Press. ISBN 978-0-226-89483-6.
- Yadav, Neeta (2001). Ardhanārīśvara in Art and Literature. New Delhi: D. K. Printworld (P) Ltd.
- Zeidan, Adam (20 January 2024). "Durga Puja". www.britannica.com. Encyclopædia Britannica, Inc. Archived from the original on 20 December 2023.

=== Websites ===
- "Complete-Works/Volume 9/Lectures and Discourses/THE WOMEN OF INDIA". ramakrishnavivekananda.info. Archived from the original on 24 October 2023.
- "Complete-Works/Volume 5/Epistles-First Series". ramakrishnavivekananda.info. Archived from the original on 24 October 2023.
- "Devi Upanishad – Rishi Atharvan". 10 October 2016. Archived from the original on 20 June 2023.
- "Devi Upanishad – Vyasa Mahabharata". Archived from the original on 28 October 2023.
- "Devi Upanishad". Astrojyoti.com. 30 May 2022. Archived from the original on 24 September 2023.
- "Full text of "108 Upanishads English Translation"". 14 January 2022.
- "Shakta". www.merriam-webster.com/dictionary. Archived from the original on 3 November 2023.
- "Durga Puja". DurgaPuja.org. Archived from the original on 27 March 2024.
- "Diwali". Diwalifestival.org. Archived from the original on 19 April 2024.
- "Kali Pooja in Bengal". Diwalifestival.org. Archived from the original on 9 November 2023.
- "Shaivas". www.philtar.ac.uk. Overview Of World Religions. Philtar: University of Cumbria. Archived from the original on 24 October 2023.
- "Hindus". www.pewresearch.org. 18 December 2012. Archived from the original on 17 April 2024.
- "History of Sakti Cult in Odisha". www.historyofodisha.in. 11 March 2018. Archived from the original on 7 August 2023.
- "kalimandir". www.kalimandir.org. Archived from the original on 3 March 2024.
- "SriVidya". www.srividya.org. Archived from the original on 25 December 2023.
- Srinivasan, G. (4 July 2007). "Regaling Varahi with different 'alankarams' in 'Ashada Navaratri'". The Hindu. Archived from the original on 14 November 2007.
- Lang, Olivia (24 November 2009). "Hindu sacrifice of 250,000 animals begins". London: Guardian. Archived from the original on 31 January 2024.
- Preston, Charles (2 July 2024). "List of religious populations | Largest Religions, Smallest Religions, Lists, Data, & Overview | Britannica". www.britannica.com.
- Shrestha, Manesh (24 November 2009). "Ritual animal slaughter begins in Nepal". CNN.com. Archived from the original on 24 October 2023.
