= Bahvricha Upanishad =

Sanskrit text and one of the minor Upanishads of Hinduism

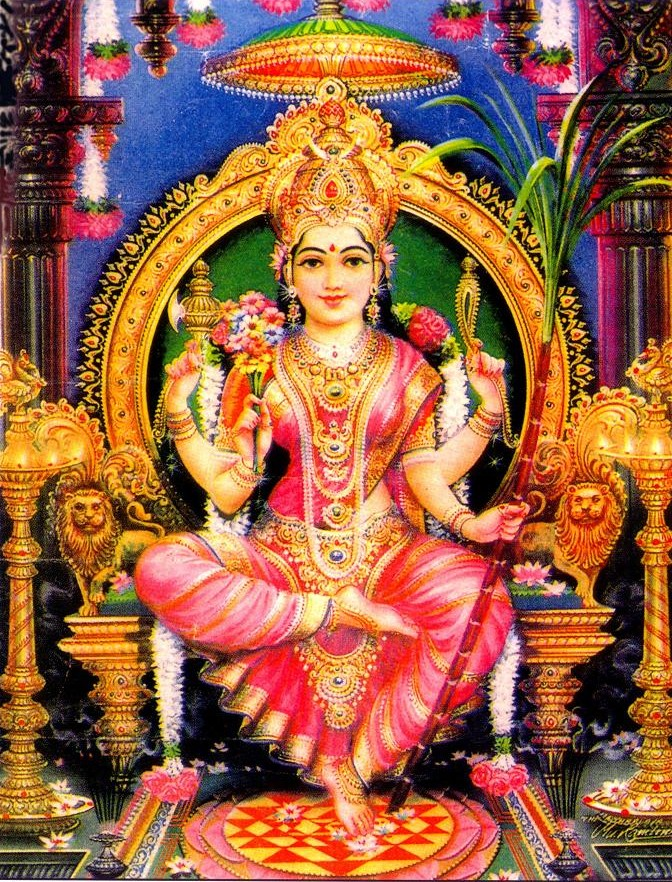
- The Upanishad states the universe began from the feminine
- Devanagari: बह्वृच
- IAST: Bahvṛca
- Title means: One conversant with Rigveda
- Date: 12th- to 15th-century CE
- Type: Shakta
- Linked Veda: Rigveda
- Chapters: 1
- Verses: 9
- Philosophy: Shaktism, Vedanta

The Bahvricha Upanishad (Sanskrit: बह्वृच उपनिषद्, IAST: Bahvṛca Upaniṣad) is a medieval era Sanskrit text and one of the minor Upanishads of Hinduism. It is classified as one of the eight Shakta Upanishads and attached to the Rigveda.

The Upanishad is notable for asserting that the Self (soul, Atman) is a Goddess who alone existed before the creation of the universe. She is the supreme power, asserts the text, she is the ultimate reality (Brahman), from her being and because of her the universe was born, she is the knowledge, the consciousness and the soul (Atman) of every being.

The philosophical premises of Bahvricha Upanishad assert the feminine as non-different, non-dual (Advaita) from transcendent reality, she is the primary and the material cause of all existence, and the text belongs to the Shaktadavaitavada tradition (literally, the path of nondualistic Shakti).

== History ==
Neither the author nor the composition date of Bahvricha Upanishad is known. The text was likely composed, in the same period as other Shakta Upanishads, between the 12th- and 15th-century CE. The text existed before the 14th-century, states Max Muller, as it was referenced by the 13th/14th-century Dvaita Vedanta scholar Madhvacharya.

In 19th-century compilations of the Upanishads, a part of the Aitareya Aranyakas from the Rigveda was sometimes called Aitareya Upanishad, Atmasatka Upanishad and also Bahvricha Upanishad. The Devi-related medieval era Bahvricha Upanishad is different from the ancient BCE era Aitareya Upanishad, but both discuss the nature of Atman (soul, Self).

Manuscripts of this text are also found titled as Bahvrcopanisad. In the Telugu language anthology of 108 Upanishads of the Muktika canon, narrated by Rama to Hanuman, it is listed at number 107.

== Contents ==
The text consists of 9 verses. Some manuscripts include a prelude in the form of an invocation asserting that the Vedas must be imbibed in one's mind, thoughts and speech, and through truth only is peace assured.

The Upanishad opens with the assertion "Devi is one and she alone existed in the beginning", she is Kama (love), and she is Atman (soul, Self), The second verse of the Upanishad states that not only Brahma, Vishnu and Rudra are her progeny but every being in the universe is her creation.

The Upanishad describes Devi as identical to all truth and reality, and whatever is not she as unreal, non-truth and non-self. She is the ultimate unchanging reality (Brahman), the consciousness, the bliss who shines by herself. She is everywhere, within and without, asserts the Upanishad. She is pure, she is love and she symbolized as the Tripurasundari goddess is the form of all. She is the ardha matra, last half syllable, of the Om syllable. Her Shakti is in Om.

She alone is Atman. Other than She is untruth, non-self. She is Brahman-Consciousness. She is the Vidya of Consciousness, nondual Brahman Consciousness, a wave of Truth-Consciousness-Bliss. The Beauty of the three-great-cities, penetrating without and within, is resplendent, nondual, self-subsisting. What is, is pure Truth; what shines, is pure Consciousness; what is dear, is Bliss. So here is the Maha-Tripura-sundari who assumes all forms. You and I and all the world and all divinities and all besides are the Maha-Tripura-sundari. The sole Truth is the thing named "the Beautiful". It is the nondual, integral, supreme Brahman.

— Bahvricha Upanishad, Verse 5 (Abridged), Translated by AG Krishna Warrier

The closing verses of the text asserts that she should be contemplated as "That which I am", as Sodasi and fifteen syllabled Sri Vidya, the power of Savitur, Sarasvati, and Gayatri, the sacred, the mother, the auspicious who chooses her own partner, the mistress, the dark, the light, the Brahmic bliss.

== See also ==
- Atharvashiras Upanishad
- Devi
- Devi Upanishad
- Mahanarayana Upanishad
