= Sarasvati-rahasya Upanishad =

Goddess related text

- Devanagari: सरस्वती रहस्य
- IAST: Sarasvatī Rahasya
- Title means: Mystery of goddess Sarasvati
- Date: 12th- to 16th-century CE
- Type: Shakta
- Linked Veda: Krishna Yajurveda
- Chapters: 2
- Verses: 47
- Philosophy: Shaktism, Vedanta

The Sarasvati-rahasya Upanishad (Sanskrit: सरस्वती रहस्य उपनिषत्, IAST: Sarasvatī-rahasya Upaniṣad), meaning “the Secret Knowledge of the Wisdom Goddess”, is a late medieval era Sanskrit text and one of the minor Upanishads of Hinduism. The text is classified as one of the eight Shakta Upanishads and embedded in the Krishna Yajurveda.

The Upanishad is notable for glorifying the feminine as the Shakti (energy, power) and as the metaphysical Brahman principle, and extensively uses a combination of Bhakti and Vedanta terminology. Annette Wilke and Oliver Moebus state that the underlying philosophical premise of this text corresponds to Advaita Vedanta. The text is important to the Goddess traditions of Hinduism.

== History ==
The author and the century in which Sarasvati-rahsya Upanishad was composed is unknown. It is a late Upanishad, likely from the late medieval period. The text was likely composed, in the same period as other Shakta Upanishads, between the 12th- and 15th-century CE. The text, along with other Shakta Upanishads, has been dated to 16th-century, according to C Mackenzie Brown – a professor of Religion and writer of books on Hindu goddesses. Even though this text is of relatively late origin, Sarasvati as goddess is traceable to Vedic literature from the 2nd millennium BCE.

The text has been influential in the Shaktism (Goddess) tradition of Hinduism. Many of its verses are found incorporated in later Shakti texts such as the Vakyasudha, a treatise on non-dualist Vedanta school of Hindu philosophy. This link had been a basis for dating this text to be from the 1st-millennium, by Maurice Winternitz and Louis Renou, because they credited the 8th-century Adi Shankara to have composed Balabodhani, which some scholars such as Windischmann considered to have been also titled as Vakyasudha and Drigdrishya Viveka. However, 20th-century scholarship doubts that Shankara was the actual author of several secondary works attributed to him, and thus it is unclear if Vakyasudha or this Upanishadic text existed before 8th-century CE.

Manuscripts of this text are also found titled as Sarasvati Upanisad, Saraswati Rahasyopnisad, Sarasvatyupanishad and Sarasvatirahasyopanisad. In the Telugu language anthology of 108 Upanishads of the Muktika canon, narrated by Rama to Hanuman, it is listed at number 106.

== Contents ==
The text has two chapters each in a distinct format. The first is structured in the style of litany hymns found in the Rigveda to Devi (goddess Sarasvati), the second part is in the Shloka (metered verse) format. The wording of the text has been layered in a way that it can be interpreted in two ways, first of dualistic Bhakti (devotional worship), second of a discourse between the devotee and the goddess representing a steady journey of the devotee towards the Vedanta philosophy, with the text's final verses climaxing with non-dualism premises, a style that Wilke and Moebus call as "code switching".

The text opens with benediction unto goddess Saraswati. This benediction, also found in other Upanishads of Krishna Yajurveda, begins with "Do thou protect us, do thou preserve us". She is praised as the essence of truth, universal empress, who manifests in all things, nourishing minds and souls, and asking for her blessing. She is called the goddess of wisdom, radiant, resplendent in white, who manifests as syllables, words, sentences, meaning and understanding, thereby purifying and enriching the soul of man. She is, according to Sarasvati-rahasya Upanishad, the goddess of anything that flows, of music, of poetry, of voice, of language, of art, of imagination. The chapter 1 of the text presents the devotee's litany with words such as, "Oh Goddess, increase my understanding", "Sarasvati! make me like yourself" and "Sarasvati, may we remain immersed in you!"

The text presents the conversation between Sarasvati and the devotee in the second chapter. Here, she is stated to be the power, inspiration and knowledge source for Brahma, the latter credited with authoring the Vedas. Thereafter, the text presents its theory of changing reality (Maya) and unchanging reality (Brahman). Sixteen of the text's verses from this chapter are referenced and found in their entirety in Vakyasudha (literally "A Nectar of Sayings"), an Advaita Vedanta text, as verses 13, 15–20, 23–28 and 30–32. The theme of these verses, states Dhavamony, is that "Brahman, the Absolute, is the ultimate ground of the objective world, and the innermost self (soul) of the subjective consciousness structure of man". It is the Vedantic theology of spiritual unity in everything.

Sarasvati: You are me

My consciousness shines in your world,
like a beautiful face in a soiled mirror,
Seeing that reflection, I call myself you,
an individual soul, as if I could be finite!

A finite soul, an infinite goddess,
these are false concepts,
in the minds of those unacquainted with truth.

No space, my loving devotee,
exists between your Self and my Self,
Know this and you are free,
This is the secret wisdom.

—Saraswati Rahasya Upanishad 2.31–2.33

The verses of Saraswati-rahasya Upanishad present a discussion of Maya as the changing reality, and Brahman as the unchanging reality. For example, the following verses appear in both this Upanishad and the Vakyasudha:

तथा सर्गब्रह्मणोश्च भेदमावृत्य तिष्ठति
या शक्तिस्त्वद्वशाद्ब्रह्म विकृतत्वेन भासते ।
अत्राप्यावृतिनाशेन विभाति ब्रह्मसर्गयोः
भेदस्तयोर्विकारः स्यात्सर्गे न ब्रह्मणि क्वचित् ।

In the same way, this power is used to conceal the distinction between Brahman and the phenomenal universe; by its efficacy Brahman appears as being of the nature of modification. Even in this case, with the destruction of concealing, the distinction between Brahman and the phenomenal universe becomes manifest. Therefore change can exist only in the phenomenal universe, but by no means in Brahman.

— Sarasvati-rahasya Upanishad, Translated by Dhavamony

The text, after its ontological discussion, presents six methods of Dharana-Samadhi (concentration-union), and meditation is a means to self-knowledge and the realization of the Goddess within oneself as self-luminous, free from duality and endowed with "Being, Consciousness and Bliss".

स्वानुभूतिरसावेशाद्दृश्यशब्दाद्यपेक्षितुः
निर्विकल्पः समाधिः स्यान्निवान्तस्थितदीपवत् ।

Once the mind becomes freed from false ideas arising from the attachment to empirical objects, the mind becomes steady like a sheltered lamp and the practitioner experiences the highest bliss in realizing his true self.

— Sarasvati-rahasya Upanishad, Translated by Dhavamony

Dualism is speculation and false, asserts the text in its closing verses, and the realization of oneness of the individual soul and goddess Saravati is Mukti (freedom, liberation).

== See also ==
- Atharvashiras Upanishad
- Devi
- Devi Upanishad
- Mahanarayana Upanishad
