= Saubhagyalakshmi Upanishad =

Minor Upanishad of Hinduism

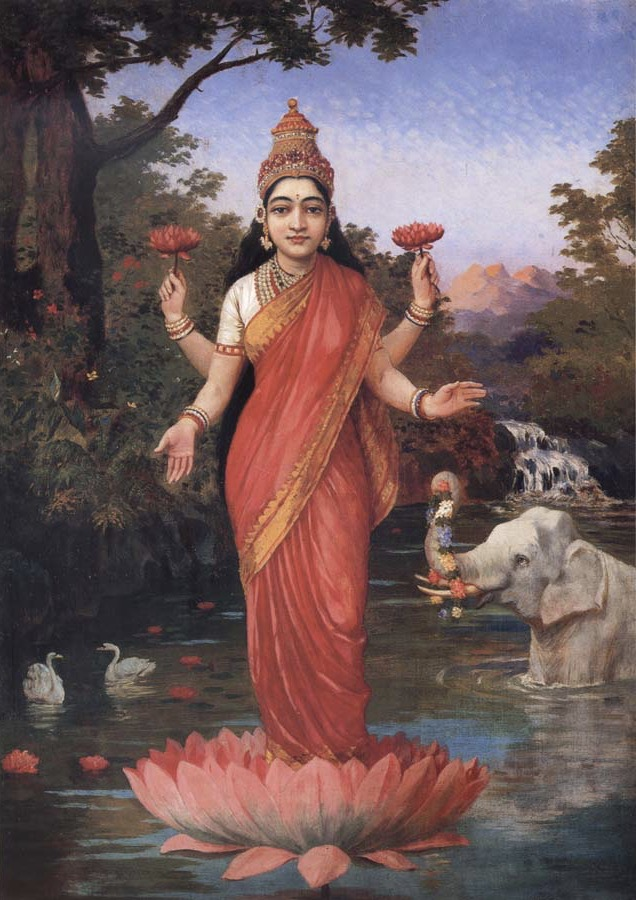
- Sri synonym for Lakshmi denoting prosperity
- Devanagari: सौभाग्यलक्ष्मी
- IAST: Saubhāgyalakṣmī
- Title means: Bestower of fortune
- Type: Shakta
- Linked Veda: Rigveda
- Chapters: 3
- Philosophy: Shakta

The Saubhagyalakshmi Upanishad (सौभाग्य लक्ष्मी उपनिषत्), also called Saubhagyalakshmyupanishad (सौभाग्यलक्ष्म्युपनिषत्), Saubhagya meaning auspicious, Lakshmi a deity, Saubhagyalakshmi is a minor Upanishadic text of Hinduism. Written in Sanskrit, it is one of the 10 Upanishads attached to the Rigveda, and is classified as one of the 8 Shakta Upanishads.

The Upanishad presents its ideas through Lakshmi, goddess of wealth, fortune, prosperity and fertility. It discusses true wealth, and then presents Yoga meditation for spiritual attainment away from material cravings and towards inner wealth. Sri is the synonym used for Lakshmi. The text also presents Tantra concepts such as nine chakra as a part of yogic practice.

The text is notable for its syncretic presentation of the Advaita Vedanta doctrines with Shaktism worship.

== History ==
In the Telugu language anthology of 108 Upanishads of the Muktika canon, narrated by Rama to Hanuman, it is listed by Paul Deussen – a German Indologist and professor of philosophy, at number 105.

== Contents ==
The Upanishad text is presented in three chapters. The first part describes the Lakshmi as the goddess of prosperity, presents the hymn of Sri, and then presents her in Tantra terms as a yantra drawing.

The text mentions the Om mantra, followed by her iconography. The text calls her lotus-eyed, describes her iconography as holding lotus, raining gifts, shining like gold, wherein white elephants spray water on her. She wears a crown with gems, glistening embroidered silk and stands in a lotus.

She is the spouse of Vishnu, states the text. She is the giver of wealth, asserts the Upanishad, but she reserves her blessings for those who are free from material cravings and never gives it to them who mindlessly cherish their desires.

Samadhi in Shaktism

As salt thrown into water,
dissolves completely as water,
so the state of I-consciousness,
dissolves in the supreme consciousness,
this is Samadhi.

—Saubhagyalakshmi Upanishad 2.14

The second chapter describes the ones who the goddess favors. Yoga, asserts the text, is their path. They seek the inner light using the Om mantra. They are moderate in their habits and what they eat, practice asana (posture) and breath exercises. The chapter describes that such yogi awaken their kundalini chakras, they look resplendent in their health because of such yoga.

The text, in second part of the second chapter, asserts that the goal of yoga is to become free of all dualities, and achieve the unity with the Atman (Self). The yogi renounces egoism, and thus becomes free of otherness and sorrow. Through yoga meditation, asserts the text, the yogi discovers concentration and the state where his lower and higher self is unified. His Self and the Supreme Brahman become one, and he abides with Lakshmi's abode, states the text.

The third chapter of the text returns to the discussion of chakra wheels, and presents nine chakras. The text is notable for presenting the supreme void as the ninth wheel. The text closes by asserting that whoever studies and understands this text gains whatever wealth he seeks and he is also liberated from the cycles of rebirth.

Navachakras (nine cycles) Chapter 3
Number	Name of the chakra	Description	Seat of
1	Brahmachakra in Muladhara	Three rings	Desires
2	Svadhishthana chakra in the Uddayan peetha	A lotus of 6 leaves	Girdle
3	Nabhi chakra	Winding in the form of a snake.	Competence
4	Anahata or heart chakra	White movement in the form of a swan	Enchantment
5	Kantha chakra	Four finger thick	Sushumna anahata
6	Talu chakra	Moon nerve	Dissolution
7	Ajna or the wheel of the brow	below skull	Words, linguistics
8	Brahmarandra in the Nirvana chakra	Thread of smoke	seat of Brahman
9	Akashi chakra	Flower in the midst of a 16-leafed lotus	Void, full mount

== See also ==
- Vrata (Vowed religious observances) and Saubhagya (Auspiciousness)
