= Devi Upanishad =

Goddess-related Hindu text

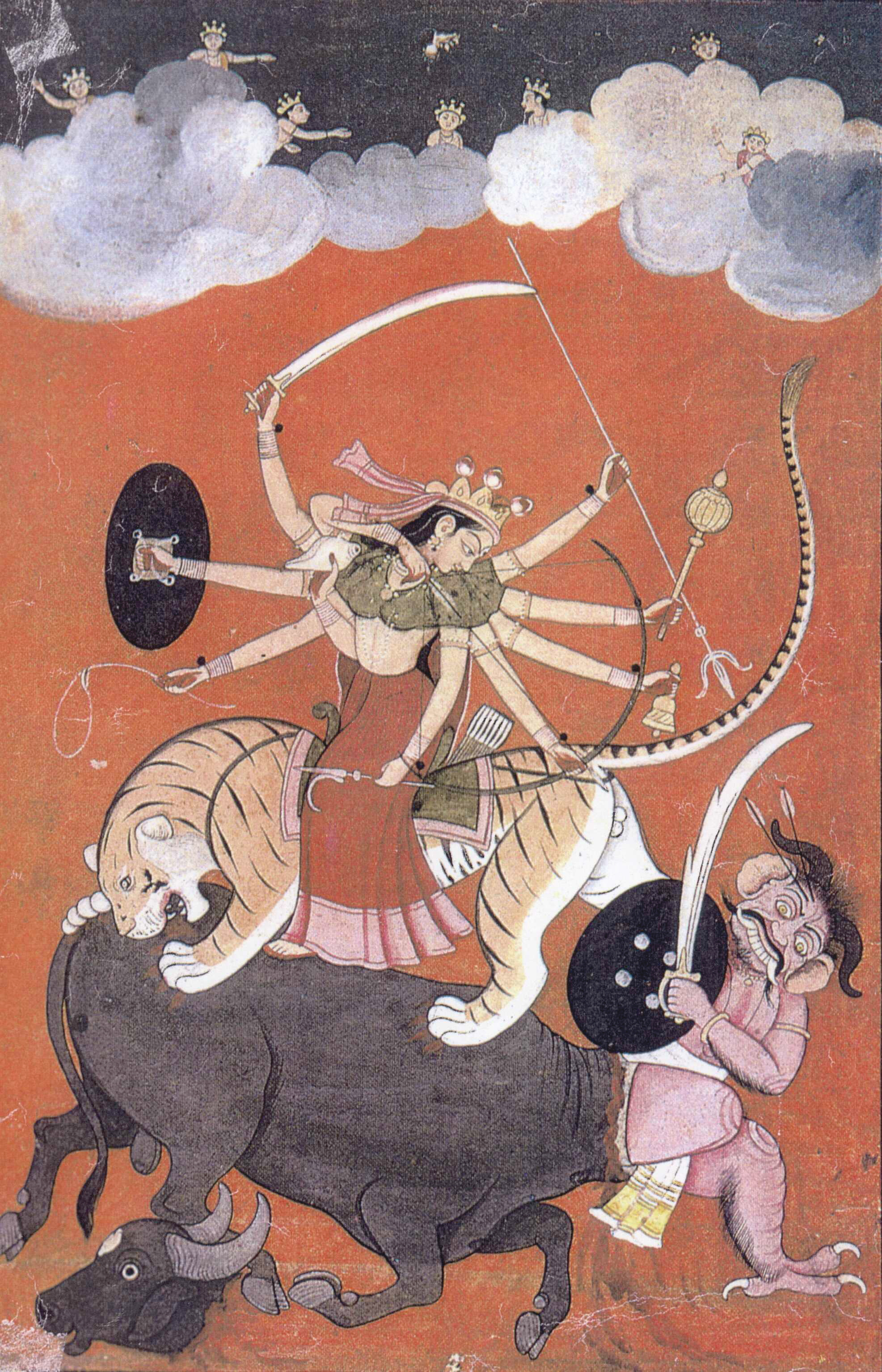
- Mahadevi or Durga
- Devanagari: देवी
- IAST: Devī
- Title means: Goddess
- Date: 9th- to 14th-centuries CE
- Type: Shakta Upanishads
- Linked Veda: Atharvaveda
- Chapters: 1
- Verses: 32
- Philosophy: Shaktism, Vedanta

The Devi Upanishad (Sanskrit:देवी उपनिषत्), is one of the minor Upanishads of Hinduism and a text composed in Sanskrit. It is one of the 19 Upanishads attached to the Atharvaveda, and is classified as one of the eight Shakta Upanishads. It is, as an Upanishad, a part of the corpus of Vedanta literature collection that present the philosophical concepts of Hinduism.

The text was likely composed between 9th- to 14th-centuries CE. It refers to Mahadevi as representing all goddesses. The Devi Upanishad is part of the five Atharvashiras Upanishads important to Tantra and Shakta philosophy traditions.

The Upanishad states that the Goddess is the Brahman (ultimate metaphysical Reality), and from her arise Prakṛti (matter) and Purusha (consciousness). She is bliss and non-bliss, the Vedas and what is different from it, the born and the unborn, and all of the universe.

== Etymology ==
Devī and Deva are Sanskrit terms found in the Vedic literature, such as the Rigveda of the 2nd millennium BCE. Deva is masculine, and the related feminine equivalent is Devi. They mean "heavenly, divine, terrestrial things of high excellence, exalted, shining ones". Etymologically, a cognate of Devī is Latin dea.

The term Upanishad means it is knowledge or "hidden doctrine" text that belongs to the corpus of Vedanta literature collection presenting the philosophical concepts of Hinduism and considered the highest purpose of its scripture, the Vedas.

== History ==
According to Cheever Mackenzie Brown – a professor of Religion at the Trinity University, this important Tantric and Shaktism text was probably composed sometime between the ninth and fourteenth centuries CE.

The Devi Upanishad is part of the five Atharva Shiras Upanishads, each of which are named after the five main deities or shrines (panchayatanan) of Ganapati, Narayana, Rudra, Surya and Devi. Its philosophy is also found in the Tripura Upanishad, Bahvricha Upanishad, and the Guhyakala Upanishad.

It is composed in Sanskrit and is a minor Upanishad. The text is listed at 81 in the modern era anthology of 108 Upanishads found in the Muktika enumerated by Rama to Hanuman. Some manuscripts of this Upanishad are titled as the Devyupanishad (देव्युपनिषत्).

== Foundation and structure ==
The Devi Upanishad consists of 32 verses after an invocation from the Atharvaveda. The text describes the goddess as the highest principle, and the ultimate truth in the universe (Brahman).

The foundational premises of reverence for the feminine, as stated in the Devi Upanishad, are present in the Rigveda, in the following hymn,

I am the Queen,
the gatherer-up of treasures, most thoughtful, first of those who merit worship.
I load with wealth the zealous sacrificer who pours the juice and offers his oblation.
Thus Gods have established me in many places with many homes to enter and abide in.
Through me alone all eat the food that feeds them, – each man who sees, breathes, hears the word out spoken.
They know it not, yet they dwell beside me. Hear, one and all, the truth as I declare it.
I, verily, myself announce and utter the word that Gods and men alike shall welcome.
I make the man I love exceedingly mighty, make him sage, a Rsi, and a Brahman.
I bend the bow for Rudra that his arrow may strike and slay the hater of devotion.
I rouse and order battle for the people, and I have penetrated Earth and Heaven.
On the world's summit I bring forth the Father: my home is in the waters, in the ocean.
Thence I extend o'er all existing creatures, and touch even yonder heaven with my forehead.
I breathe a strong breath like the wind and tempest, the while I hold together all existence.
Beyond the wide earth and beyond the heavens I have become so mighty in my grandeur.
I move with Rudras and Vasus, with Ā dityas and Visvedevas,
Mitra and Varuņa, Indra and Agni, I support, and the two Aśvins.
I uphold Soma, Tvaşțr, Pūşan and Bhaga,
The wide-stepping Vishnu, Brahma, Prajāpati.

— Devi Sukta, Rigveda 10.125.3 – 10.125.8,

The Devi Upanishad, in a manner similar to this Rigvedic hymn, asserts that from the Goddess arise Prakṛti (matter) and Purusha (consciousness), she is bliss and non-bliss, from her emerged the Vedas and what is different from it, the born and the unborn, and all of the universe. She suggests that "Brahman and non-Brahman must be known", that she is all the five elements, as well as all that is different from these elements, what is above, what is below, what is around, and thus the universe in its entirety.

== Contents ==
=== Who is the Goddess? ===
The Devi Upanishad opens with a gathering of gods, who ask, "Great Goddess, who are you?"

The Devi asserts that she is Svarupini – identical in form to – Brahman. (Note: In some manuscripts of the Devi Upanishad, this is in verse 17;) In verses 2 and 3, states Thomas B. Coburn, Devi explains her forms of nirguna (without attributes) and saguna (with attributes), the true being (Sat), the consciousness (Citta) and the bliss (Anand). (Note: This corresponds to Satcitananda concept of Hinduism;)

Verses 2 and 3 further assert that she is the universe, the Prakrti (nature) and Purusha (consciousness), the knowledge and ignorance, Brahman and Non-Brahman, the Vedas and whatever is different from it, "the unborn and the born, I am below, above and around".

In verses 4 and 5, the Devi Upanishad mirrors the opening verses of the Devi sukta hymn of the Rigveda.

I move with Rudras and Vasus, with Adityas and Visvedevas,
Mitra and Varuna, Indra and Agni, I support, and the two Asvins.
I uphold Soma, Tvastir, Pusan and Bhaga,
The wide-stepping Vishnu, Brahma, Prajapati.

— Devi Upanishad, 4 – 5, Translated by AG Krishna Warrier

I travel with the Rudras and the Vasus, with the Adityas and All-Gods I wander.
I hold aloft both Varuna and Mitra, Indra and Agni, and the Pair of Asvins.
I cherish and sustain high-swelling Soma, and Tvastar I support, Pusan, and Bhaga.
I load with wealth the zealous sacrificer who pours the juice and offers his oblation

— Rigveda, 10.125.1 – 10.125.2, Translated by Ralph Griffith – an Indologist

The first five verses of the Devi Upanishad resonate with ideas from the Mahanarayana Upanishad and the Shvetashvatara Upanishad. There, states June McDaniel – a Professor of Religious Studies, the ideas of metaphysical reality called Brahman is in "everything below, around and above is her own personification".

After suggesting in the first six verses that she is identical with Mahadevi, Durga, Kali, Mahalakshmi, Vaishnavi, Saraswati and all goddesses, Devi asserts that it is she to whom the oblations of any Yajna (fire rituals) reach. In verse 7, with a hymn structure resonating with the Gayatri Mantra, the Devi states, that one who knows "my essence in the water of the inner sea", attains her.

=== Devi stuti and iconography ===
In verses 8 through 14, the gathered gods acknowledge Devi's answer. They accept, states Devi Upanishad, that she is the Shakti, the Maha-vidya (the great knowledge), the Vedas, the power of Vishnu, she is the inspirer, she is the reason that gods were born, she is the love in the universe, the primordial source of universe, the bearer of thunderbolt, the cave, the wind, the cloud, the enchanting, the power of Self. This part of the Upanishad is the same as the Devi Stuti in Devi Gita 1.44–1.48.

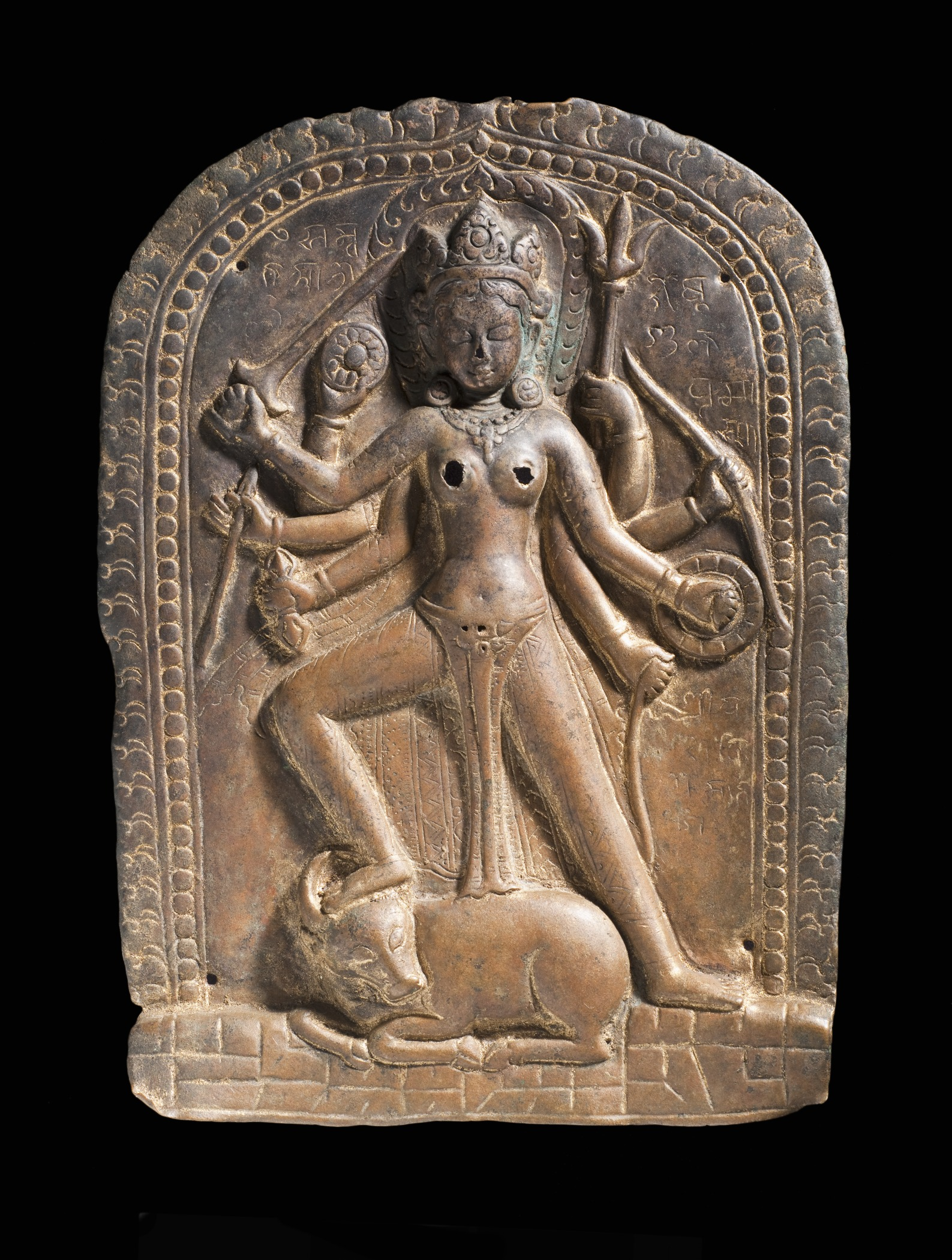
Iconography found in sculpture and paintings of Devi as Durga, such as above from 11th century Nepal, is mentioned in the Devi Upanishad.

In verse 15, in an iconographic description of the Great Goddess, the text states Devi carries a noose, a goad, a bow and arrow, and enchants all.

According to verse 18, she is venerated because Devi is eight attendant deities of Indra ("Vasus"); the eleven Rudras; and the twelve Adityas or sun gods representing each month of a year. She represents all gods who consume the Vedic ritual drink Soma or those who choose not to. She is also all the goblins, the demons, the evil beings, the ghosts, the super-human and the semi-divine, the planets, stars and all that shines in the sky, she is time and its divisions, she is everything that was, is and will be in the universe.

She is, states the text, the three Guṇas – Sattva, Rajas and Tamas. She is Prajapati, Indra and Manu. She is infinite, pure, Shiva, refuge and the giver of that which is good, states verse 19.

In another iconic description, in verses 20 and 24, the texts says that she is seated in one's "lotus heart", adorned with a crescent moon, conjoined with fire, glowing like the early morning sun, propitious, armed with the "noose and goad", with expressions marking her benevolence and dissolving fears, and that she is three eyed, attired in red, tender, bestows all wishes to her devotees.

=== Epilogue ===
The Upanishad, in verses 26 to 28, asserts that Devi is "Unknowable, the Endless, the Incomprehensible, the Unknown, the One and the Many." The Upanishad states that Devi is the fountainhead of all mantras. All knowledge is her inherent characteristic, beyond her there is nothing, she is the pilot of worldly life.

In verses 29 to 32, the benefits of reciting this Upanishad, at specific times and days are explained. Reciting the Upanishad ten times removes all sins and obstacles; also prescribes recitation in the morning and evening hours to get the same benefits. Recitation at midnight makes one's speech perfect. Recitation during the consecration of an image of a deity imbibes the image with energy.

== Influence in Tantra ==
The tantric aspect in this Upanishad, says McDaniel, is in the usage of the terms yantra, bindu, bija, mantra, shakti and chakra.

The five verses from 8 to 12 form part of the Devi Stuti (in Devi Gita 1.44–48). This reflects the Vedicization of tantric nature of the Devi Upanishad, a fusion, which the author of the Devi Gita says "as one of those texts whose recitation is pleasing to her." Her relationship with Shiva like Aditi and the progeny of Skanda, her comradeship with goddesses like Saraswati and Lakshmi, her status as Maya (the empirical reality) and her representation of the wind, the cloud and Indra are all recalled in verses 8 to 14.

== Bibliography ==
- Brown, Cheever Mackenzie (1998). The Devi Gita: The Song of the Goddess: A Translation, Annotation, and Commentary. SUNY Press. ISBN 978-0-7914-3939-5.
- Coburn, Thomas B. (1991). Encountering the Goddess: A Translation of the Devi-Mahatmya and a Study of Its Interpretation. SUNY Press. ISBN 978-0-7914-0445-4.
- Deussen, Paul; Bedekar, V.M. (tr.); Palsule (tr.), G.B. (1 January 1997). Sixty Upanishads of the Veda. Motilal Banarsidass. ISBN 978-81-208-1467-7.
- Kennedy, Vans (1831). Researches Into the Nature and Affinity of Ancient and Hindu Mythology. Longmans, Rees, Orme, Brown, and Green. p. 491.
- Klostermaier, Klaus K. (2010). Survey of Hinduism, A: Third Edition. SUNY Press. ISBN 978-0-7914-8011-3.
- McDaniel, June (9 July 2004). Offering Flowers, Feeding Skulls : Popular Goddess Worship in West Bengal: Popular Goddess Worship in West Bengal. Oxford University Press, USA. ISBN 978-0-19-534713-5.
- Ramamoorthy, Dr. H.; Nome (2000). The Song of Ribhu: The English Translation of the Tamil Ribhu Gita. Society of Abidance in Truth. ISBN 978-0-9703667-0-2.
- Tinoco, Carlos Alberto (1997). Upanishads. IBRASA. ISBN 978-85-348-0040-2.
- Knapp, Stephen (2005). The Heart of Hinduism: The Eastern Path to Freedom, Empowerment, and Illumination. iUniverse. ISBN 978-0-595-35075-9.
- Warrier, AG Krishna (1967). Śākta Upaniṣads. Adyar Library and Research Center. ISBN 978-0835673181. OCLC 2606086.
