= Sita Upanishad =

Minor Upanishad

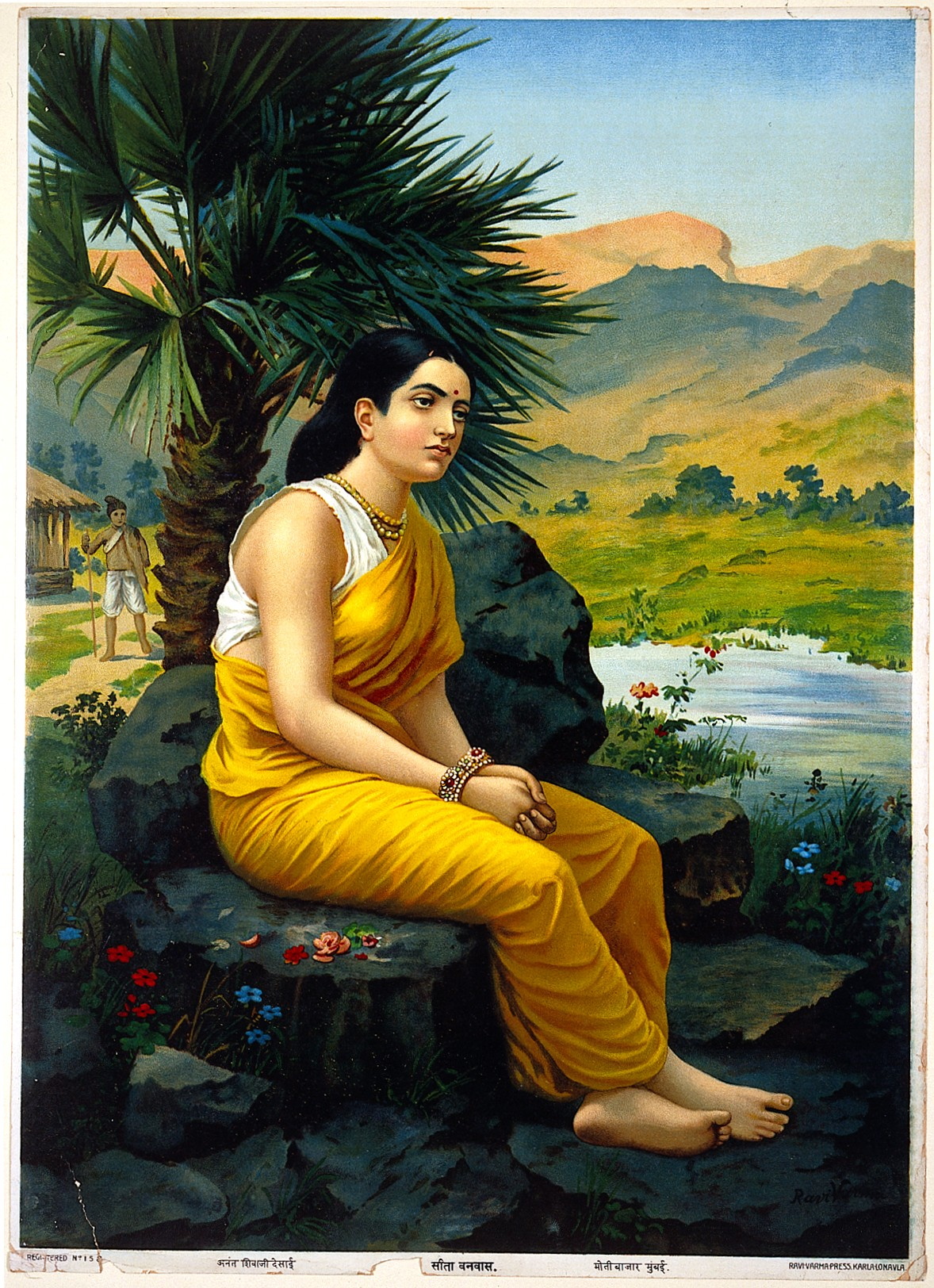
- Sita
- Devanagari: सीता
- IAST: Sītā
- Title means: Goddess Sita
- Date: 12th- to 15th-century
- Type: Vaishnava
- Linked Veda: Atharva Veda
- Chapters: 1
- Verses: 37
- Philosophy: Vaishnavism, Vedanta

The Sita Upanishad (Sanskrit: सीता उपनिषत्) is a medieval era Sanskrit text and a minor Upanishad of Hinduism. It is attached to the Atharva Veda, and is one of the Vaishnava upanishads. It is categorized as a late Upanishad, in which goddess Sita is extolled as the Ultimate Reality of the Universe (Brahman), the ground of Being (Spirituality), and material cause behind all manifestation. The Upanishad identifies Sita with primordial Prakriti (nature) and her three powers, asserts the text, are manifested in daily life as will (iccha), action (kriyā) and knowledge (jnana).

This Upanishad is notable for asserting that the cosmos is Atman (soul), it resides in the heart, its awareness and self-realization emerges by Vichara (investigation into the Self) and Samadhi, the ultimate stage of meditation.

== History ==
The author and the century in which Sita Upanishad was composed is unknown. The text was likely composed, in the same period as other Shakta Upanishads, between the 12th- and 15th-century CE. Even though this text is of relatively late origin, Sita as goddess is traceable to 1st-millennium BCE Hindu texts and the Epic Ramayana.

Manuscripts of this text are also found titled as Sitopanishad. In the Telugu language anthology of 108 Upanishads of the Muktika canon, narrated by Rama to Hanuman, it is listed at number 45.

== Contents ==
The Upanishad has 37 verses in one chapter and is narrated as a discourse between Prajapati and the gods, the latter eager about "Who is Sita? What is her nature?"

Prajapati describes Sita as primal Prakriti, or primordial nature. She is, asserts the text, same as Lakshmi and the Shakti (energy and power) of Vishnu. The text references and uses fragments of hymns in the Vajasaneyi Samhita of Yajurveda, asserting the goddess to manifest all the times as "will, action and knowledge" that drives change in the universe, wherein everything, the empirically observed and the transcendental reality, is manifestation of her Being.

Sita is all of creation, the good and the bad, all the gods and the demons, the cause and the effect, the material and the spiritual, the virtue and the beauty. Her quality includes the changing reality (Maya, metaphysical illusion), and the unchanging reality without a second (Brahman, metaphysical constant). She is free from change. She has no blemishes. She represents the vocal form of the four Vedas, which the text asserts comes from 21 schools of Rigveda, 109 schools of Yajurveda, 1000 schools of Samaveda, and 40 schools of Atharvaveda. She is ethics, tradition, law, legend, and the five minor Vedas, asserts the text, naming these as architecture, archery, music, medicine and Daivika (divinity). She is the basis of the whole world, is composed of Brahma Vishnu and Shiva, and she is the soul (inner self, Atman) that resides in all livings.

Who is Sita?

सा देवी त्रिविधा भवति शक्त्यासना
इच्छाशक्तिः क्रियाशक्तिः साक्षाच्छक्तिरिति

That divine Being is threefold,
through her power, namely,
the power of desire,
the power of action,
the power of knowledge.

— Sita Upanishad verse 11

Her name Sita, signifies Pranava or “Aum”, and she is the first cause of the universe. The text then offers a folk etymology for her name, asserting that each letter of her name has specific meaning. The “S” indicates Satya or eternal truth, the “i” signifies Maya or illusion in an unchanging form, and “ta” denoting the goddess of speech conjoined with Brahman.

The text weaves in mythical elements of her origins. She, asserts the text, emerged at the tip of the plough symbolizing her link to Prakriti or nature that feeds and nourishes all life. She is all pervading. She, asserts the text, lights up everything in all worlds. "The wheel of time and the wheel of the Universe" are her personifications. Evolution and preservation are her gifts, she is the tree of plenty.

She is Lakshmi, seated as a Yogini on her lion throne. The universe is full of the beautiful, states the Upanishad, and all that beauty is she, she alone.

The Vedas are her, states Sita Upanishad, and she personifies the three goddesses: Shri (goddess of prosperity, Lakshmi), Bhumi (mother earth), and Nila (goddess of destruction). These manifestations of her, correspond to Samkhya theory of Guṇa, as Sattva, Rajas and Tamas respectively, and are traced in Vaishnavism tradition respectively to the Sri-Sukta, Bhu-Sukta, and Nila-Sukta hymns in the Vedas.

Sita, states the text, is the supreme goddess, non-dual Brahman (Ultimate Reality), the Being (Spirituality), and material cause of empirical reality.

== Reception ==
David Scott states that the description of Sita in this Upanishad mirrors the description of goddesses in Greek literature and other civilizations. Sita is described in verse 10 of this text, states Scott, as the one with different forms yet same in essence, "she is all" embodied with various attributes and activities, she is who manifests as gods, sages and men. Similarly, adds Scott, Apuleius in section 11.5 of Metamorphoses describes its goddess as, "Though I am worshipped in many aspects, known by countless names and propitiated by all manners of different rites, yet the whole earth venerates me".

== Bibliography ==
- Cush, Denise (2007). Encyclopedia of Hinduism. Routledge. ISBN 978-0415556231.
- Dalal, Roshen (2014). Hinduism: An Alphabetical Guide. Penguin. ISBN 978-81-8475-277-9.
- Deussen, Paul (1997). Sixty Upanishads of the Veda. Motilal Banarsidass. ISBN 978-81-208-1467-7.
- Hattangadi, Sunder (2000). "सीतोपनिषत् (Sita Upanishad)" (PDF) (in Sanskrit).
- Johnsen, Linda (2002). The Living Goddess. YI Publishers. ISBN 978-0936663289.
- Maharshi, Ramana; Brunton, Paul; Venkataramiah, Mungala (1984). Conscious Immortality: Conversations with Ramana Maharshi. Sri Ramanasramam.
- Mahadevan, T. M. P. (1975). Upaniṣads: Selections from 108 Upaniṣads. Motilal Banarsidass. ISBN 978-81-208-1611-4.
- Nair, Shantha N. (1 January 2008). Echoes of Ancient Indian Wisdom. Pustak Mahal. ISBN 978-81-223-1020-7.
- Prasoon, Prof.S.K. (1 January 2008). Indian Scriptures. Pustak Mahal. ISBN 978-81-223-1007-8.
- Tinoco, Carlos Alberto (1996). Upanishads. IBRASA. ISBN 978-85-348-0040-2.
- Warrier, AG Krishna (1967). Śākta Upaniṣads. Adyar Library and Research Center. ISBN 978-0835673181. OCLC 2606086.
