= Outline of Hinduism =

Range of Indian religious traditions

The following outline is provided as an overview of and topical guide to Hinduism:

Hinduism – predominant and indigenous religious tradition of the Indian subcontinent. Its followers are called Hindus, who refer to it as Sanātana Dharma (Sanskrit: सनातनधर्मः, lit. 'the eternal law that sustains/upholds/surely preserves'), amongst many other expressions. Hinduism has no single founder, and is formed of diverse traditions, including a wide spectrum of laws and prescriptions of "daily morality" based on the notion of karma, dharma, and societal norms. Among its direct roots is the historical Vedic religion of Iron Age India and, as such, Hinduism is often called the "oldest living religion" or the "oldest living major religion" in the world.

== General reference ==
- Pronunciation: /ˈhɪnduɪzəm/ HIN-doo-iz-əm
- Common English name: Hinduism
- Adherent(s): Hindus
- Sacred language: Sanskrit (sa)
- Sacred sign: Om (ॐ)

== History ==
- History of Hinduism in Pakistan
- History of Hinduism in Southeast Asia
- History of Hinduism in Afghanistan
- History of Hinduism in China
- History of Hinduism in the Philippines

=== Prehistoric ===
- Indus Valley civilisation
- Dravidian folk religion

=== Vedic history ===
- Historical Vedic religion
- Vedic Sanskrit
- Iron Age in India
- Proto-Indo-Europeans
- Proto-Indo-European religion
- Proto-Indo-Iranian religion
- Indo-Aryan migrations

== Denomination ==
=== Vaishnavism ===
- Manipuri Vaishnavism
- Bhagavatism
- Vaikhanasas
- Pancharatra
- Thenkalais
- Vadakalais
  - Munitraya
- Krishnaism
- Jagannathism
- Warkari
- Mahanubhava
- Haridasa
- Sahajiya
  - Baul
- Pushtimarg
- Ekasarana
- Gaudiya
- Radha-vallabha
- Ramanandi
- Kapadi
- Balmiki
- Kabir panth
- Dadu panth
- Pranami
- Swaminarayan
- Ramsnehi
- Mahanam

=== Shaivism ===
- History of Shaivism
- Kashmir Shaivism
- Shiva
  - Sadasiva
  - Bhairava
  - Rudra
  - Virabhadra
- Shakti
  - Parvati
  - Sati
  - Durga
  - Kali
- Ganesha
- Kartikeya
- Sastha
- Shiva forms
- Others
- Agamas and Tantras
- Shivasutras
- Tirumurai
- Vachanas
- Pati
- Pashu
- Pasam

Three bondages

- Karma
- Maya
- 36 Tattvas
- Yoga
- Satkaryavada
- Abhasavada
- Svatantrya
- Aham
- Samariscus
  - Vibhuti
  - Rudraksha
  - Panchakshara
  - Bilva
  - Maha Shivaratri
  - Yamas-Niyamas
  - Guru-Linga-Jangam
- Philosophies and Schools
- Adi Margam
  - Pashupata
  - Kalamukha
  - Kapalika
  Mantra Margam Saiddhantika
  - Siddhantism Non - Saiddhantika
  - Kashmir Shaivism
    - Pratyabhijna
    - Vama
    - Dakshina
    - Kaula: Trika-Yamala-Kubjika-Netra
  - Others
    - Nath
      - Inchegeri
    - Veerashaiva/Lingayatism
    - Siddharism
    - Sroutaism
    - Aghori
    - Indonesian

=== Newer movements ===
- Advait Mat
  - Divine Light Mission
- American Meditation Institute
- Ananda (Ananda Yoga)
- Ananda Ashrama
- Ananda Marga
- Art of Living Foundation
- Arya Samaj
- Ayyavazhi
- Brahma Kumaris
- Brahmoism (Brahmo Samaj)
  - Adi Dharm
  - Sadharan Brahmo Samaj
- Chinmaya Mission
- Datta Yoga
- Divine Life Society
- Hanuman Foundation
- Himalayan Institute of Yoga Science and Philosophy
- Advaita Vedanta
- Akshar-Purushottam Darshan
- Bhedabheda
  - Achintya Bheda Abheda
  - Dvaitadvaita
- Dvaita Vedanta
- Integral yoga
- Pratyabhijna
- Shaiva Siddhanta
- Shiva Advaita
- Shuddhadvaita
- Vishishtadvaita

== Practices ==
=== Festivals ===
- Diwali
- Holi
- Shivaratri
- Raksha Bandhan
- Navaratri
  - Durga Puja
  - Ramlila
  - Vijayadashami
- Ganesh Chaturthi
- Rama Navami
- Janmashtami
- Onam
- Pongal
- Makar Sankranti
- New Year
  - Bihu
  - Gudi Padwa
  - Pahela Baishakh
  - Puthandu
  - Vaisakhi
  - Vishu
  - Ugadi
- Kumbh Mela
  - Haridwar
  - Nashik
  - Prayag
  - Ujjain
- Ratha Yatra
- Teej
- Vasant Panchami

=== Philosophy ===
- Ahimsa
- Arati
- Āstika and nāstika
- Bhakti
- Bhajan
- Brahman
- Darshan
- Dashavatara
  - Matsya
  - Kurma
  - Varaha
  - Narasimha
  - Vamana
  - Parashurama
  - Rama
  - Krishna/ Jagannatha/Vithoba
  - Balarama/Budha
  - Kalki
- Deva
- Dhyana
- Diksha
- Guru
- Hare Krishna
- Om
- Japa
- Kirtan
- Krishnaism
- Mantras
- Maya (religion)
- Moksha
- Pancha-tattva
  - Chaitanya
  - Nityananda
  - Advaita Acharya
  - Gadadhara Pandita
  - Srivasa Thakura
- Puja
- Prāyaścitta
- Rishis
- Sattvic diet
- Supreme Personality of Godhead
- Tilaka
- Yoga

== Politics ==
- Hindu studies
- Hindutva
- Hindu nationalism

=== Hindu groups and political parties ===
- Bharatiya Janata Party
- Shiv Sena
- Hindu Samaj Party
- Asom Bharatiya Janata Party
- Maharashtra Navnirman Sena
- Hindu Munnani
- Hindu Dharma Samudaya of Bhutan
- Maharashtrawadi Gomantak Party
- Hindu Makkal Katchi
- Dr. Syamaprasad Jana Jagaran Manch
- Bharath Dharma Jana Sena
- Hindu Mahasabha
- Hindu Mahajana Sangam
- Hindu Samhati
- Shivsena Nepal
- Rastriya Prajatantra Party Nepal
- Rastriya Prajatantra Party
- Hindu Prajatantrik Party
- Siva Senai
- Banga Sena
- Swadhin Bangabhumi Andolan
- Pakistan Hindu Party
- Progressive Reform Party (Suriname)
- HINDRAF
- Malaysia Makkal Sakti Party
- Malaysian Ceylonese Congress
- Malaysian Advancement Party
- Minority Rights Action Party
- Sangh Parivar
  - Vishva Hindu Parishad
  - Rashtriya Swayamsevak Sangh
  - Akhil Bharatiya Vidyarthi Parishad
  - Bharatiya Mazdoor Sangh
  - Bharatiya Kisan Sangh
  - Bajrang Dal
  - Hindu Swayamsevak Sangh
  - Akhil Bharatiya Adhivakta Parishad
  - Swadeshi Jagaran Manch
  - Deen Dayal Shodh Sansthan
  - Bharat Vikas Parishad
  - Sabarimala Ayyappa Seva Samajam
  - Seva Bharati
  - Hindu Aikya Vedi
  - Ekal Vidyalaya
  - Saraswati Shishu Mandir
  - Vidya Bharati Akhil Bharatiya Shiksha Sansthan
  - Vanavasi Kalyan Ashram
  - Friends of Tribals Society
  - Akhil Bharatiya Itihas Sankalan Yojana
  - India Development and Relief Fund

=== Organisations ===
- Survey of Hindu organisations
- ISKCON
- Swaminarayan Sampraday
- Bochasanwasi Shri Akshar Purushottam Swaminarayan Sanstha
- Arya Samaj
- Ramakrishna Mission
- Sringeri Sharada Peetham
- Banga Mahila Vidyalaya
- Gaudiya Math
- Hindu Maha Sabha (Fiji)
- Manav Dharma Sabha
- Paramahansa Mandali
- Prarthana Samaj
- Ratnagiri Hindu Sabha
- Satyashodhak Samaj
- Tattwabodhini Sabha
- Theosophical Society of the Arya Samaj
- Trust deed of Brahmo Sabha
- Hindu Sewa Parishad
- Sri Trimurtidham Balaji Hanuman Mandir
- Saiva Siddhanta Church
- Sanatan Dharma Maha Sabha
- Sanatan Sanstha
- Santhigiri Ashram
- Sathya Sai Organization
- Satsang (Deoghar)
- Science of Identity Foundation
- Science of Spirituality (a.k.a. Sawan Kirpal Ruhani Mission)
- Self-Realization Fellowship
  - Yogoda Satsanga Society of India
- Shree Shree Anandamayee Sangha
- Siddha Yoga Dham Associates Foundation
- Sivananda Yoga Vedanta Centres
- Society of Abidance in Truth
- Sree Narayana Dharma Paripalana Yogam
  - Alwaye Advaita Ashram
  - Sree Narayana Trust
  - List of Sree Narayana Institutions
- Sri Aurobindo Ashram
  - Auroville Foundation
  - Sri Aurobindo International School, Hyderabad
- Sri Chinmoy Centres
- Sri Ramana Ashram
- Sri Sri Radha Govindaji Trust
- Sringeri Sharada Peetham
- Swadhyay Parivar
- Swaminarayan Mandir Vasna Sanstha
- Vishwa Madhwa Maha Parishat
- Vishwa Nirmala Dharma

== Hindu texts ==
- Shruti
- Smriti

=== Vedas ===
- Rigveda
- Samaveda
- Yajurveda
- Atharvaveda
- Samhita
- Brahmana
- Aranyaka
- Upanishads

=== Upanishads ===
==== 108 Upanishads ====
- The 108 Upanishads
  - Isha
  - Kena
  - Katha
  - Prashna
  - Mundaka
  - Mandukya
  - Taittiriya
  - Aitareya
  - Chandogya
  - Brihadaranyaka
  - Brahma
  - Kaivalya
  - Jabala
  - Shvetashvatara
  - Hamsa
  - Aruneya
  - Garbha
  - Narayana
  - Paramahamsa
  - Amritabindu
  - Amritanada
  - Atharvashiras
  - Atharvashikha
  - Maitrayaniya
  - Kaushitaki
  - Brihajjabala
  - Nrisimha Tapaniya
  - Kalagni Rudra
  - Maitreya
  - Subala
  - Kshurika
  - Mantrika
  - Sarvasara
  - Niralamba
  - Shukarahasya
  - Vajrasuchi
  - Tejobindu
  - Nadabindu
  - Dhyanabindu
  - Brahmavidya
  - Yogatattva
  - Atmabodha
  - Naradaparivrajaka
  - Trishikhi-brahmana
  - Sita
  - Yogachudamani
  - Nirvana
  - Mandala-brahmana
  - Dakshinamurti
  - Sharabha
  - Skanda
  - Mahanarayana
  - Advayataraka
  - Rama Rahasya
  - Ramatapaniya
  - Vasudeva
  - Mudgala
  - Shandilya
  - Paingala
  - Bhikshuka
  - Maha
  - Sariraka
  - Yogashikha
  - Turiyatita
  - Sannyasa
  - Paramahamsaparivrajaka
  - Akshamalika
  - Avyakta
  - Ekakshara
  - Annapurna
  - Surya
  - Akshi
  - Adhyatma
  - Kundika
  - Savitri
  - Atma
  - Pashupatabrahma
  - Parabrahma
  - Avadhuta
  - Tripuratapini
  - Devi
  - Tripura
  - Kathashruti
  - Bhavana
  - Rudrahridaya
  - Yoga-Kundalini
  - Bhasma
  - Rudraksha
  - Ganapati
  - Darshana
  - Tarasara
  - Mahavakya
  - Pancabrahma
  - Pranagnihotra
  - Gopala-Tapani
  - Krishna
  - Yajnavalkya
  - Varaha
  - Shatyayaniya
  - Hayagriva
  - Dattatreya
  - Garuda
  - Kali-Santarana
  - Jabali
  - Saubhagyalakshmi
  - Sarasvati-rahasya
  - Bahvricha
  - Muktikā

==== Rig Vedic ====
- Aitareya
- Kaushitaki

==== Sama Vedic ====
- Chandogya
- Kena

==== Yajur Vedic ====
- Brihadaranyaka
- Isha
- Taittiriya
- Katha
- Shvetashvatara
- Maitri

==== Atharava Vedic ====
- Mundaka
- Mandukya
- Prashna

=== Vedangas ===
- Shiksha
- Chandas
- Vyakarana
- Nirukta
- Kalpa
- Jyotisha

=== Puranas ===
==== Brahma Puranas ====
- Brahma
- Brahmānda
- Brahmavaivarta
- Markandeya
- Bhavishya

==== Vaishnava Puranas ====
- Vishnu
- Bhagavata
- Naradiya
- Garuda
- Padma
- Vamana
- Varaha Purana
- Kurma
- Matsya

==== Shaiva Puranas ====
- Shiva
- Linga
- Skanda
- Vayu
- Agni

=== Shastras and Sutras ===
- Dharma Shastra
- Artha Shastra
- Kamasutra
- Brahma Sutras
- Samkhya Sutras
- Mimamsa Sutras
- Nyāya Sūtras
- Vaiśeṣika Sūtra
- Yoga Sutras
- Pramana Sutras
- Charaka Samhita
- Sushruta Samhita
- Natya Shastra
- Vastu Shastra
- Panchatantra
- Divya Prabandha
- Tirumurai
- Ramcharitmanas
- Yoga Vasistha
- Swara yoga
- Shiva Samhita
- Gheranda Samhita
- Panchadasi
- Vedantasara
- Stotra

=== Literary texts ===
- Ramayana
- Mahabharata
- Bhagavad Gita

== Hindu people ==
- List of Hindus
- List of Hindu gurus

=== Freedom fighters ===
- Pazhassi Raja
- Mangal Pandey
- Chandrashekhar Azad
- Subhas Chandra Bose
- Bankim Chandra Chatterjee
- Lokmanya Tilak
- Mahatma Gandhi

=== Social leaders ===
- B. R. Ambedkar
- K.B. Hedgewar
- Madhav Sadashiv Golwalkar
- K.S. Sudarshan
- Pravin Togadia
- Shanta Kumar

=== Politicians ===
- Mahatma Gandhi
- Jawaharlal Nehru
- Vallabhbhai Patel
- Lal Bahadur Shastri
- Rajiv Gandhi
- Indira Gandhi
- Atal Bihari Vajpayee
- Lal Krishna Advani
- Balasaheb Thackeray
- Yogi Adityanath
- Govindacharya
- Narendra Modi
- Uma Bharti
- Himanta Biswa Sarma
- Rajnath Singh

== Other terms and concepts ==
- Maya (illusion)
- Itihasa
- Karma in Hinduism
- Kosas
- Sri
- Shakti
- Purusha
- Gayatri
- Vac

== Inter-religious ==
- Hinduism and Buddhism
  - Gautama Buddha in Hinduism
  - Theravada
- Hinduism and Jainism
  - Rama in Jainism
  - Salakapurusa
- Hinduism and Sikhism
  - Rama in Sikhism
  - Dasam Granth
- Hinduism and Islam
  - Hindu-Muslim riots
  - Hindu–Muslim unity
  - Ganga-Jamuni tehzeeb
- Hinduism and Christianity
- Hinduism and Judaism
