= Samanya Upanishads =

Hindu religious text

Samanya Upanishads or Samanya Vedanta Upanishads are minor Upanishads of Hinduism that are of a generic nature. They were composed later and are classified separate from the thirteen major Principal Upanishads considered to be more ancient and connected to the Vedic tradition.

The Samanya Upanishad as group contrast with other minor Upanishads grouped as the Yoga Upanishads which are related to Yoga, the Sannyasa Upanishads which are related to Hindu renunciation and monastic practice, the Shaiva Upanishads which are related to Shaivism, the Vaishnava Upanishads which are related to Vaishnavism, and the Shakta Upanishads which are related to Shaktism.

The Samanya Vedanta Upanishads are variously classified, ranging from a list of 21 to 24. The variation in count is based on whether some of the older Principal Upanishads are included as Samanya. Some include three ancient Upanishads as Samanya Upanishads bringing the list to 24: 14. Shvetashvatara Upanishad; 24. Maitrayaniya Upanishad; and 25. Kaushitaki Upanishad. If these three are included as Samanya Upanishads, the list of Principal Upanishads shrinks to ten. Many scholars, however, consider the Principal Upanishads to be thirteen.

== Nomenclature ==
The term samanya literally means "generic, universal".

== Date ==
The Principal Upanishads are dated to be between eighth and first century BCE, the estimates for the minor Upanishads vary. According to Mahony, the minor Upanishads are approximately dated to be from about 100 BC to 1100 AD.

== List of 21 Samanya Upanishads ==
List of the Samanya Vedanta Upanishads
Title	Muktika serial #	Attached Veda	Period of creation
Garbha Upanishad	17	Krishna Yajurveda	
Subala Upanishad	30	Shukla Yajurveda	2nd millennium CE
Mantrika Upanishad	32	Shukla Yajurveda	1st millennium BCE
Sarvasara Upanishad	33	Atharvaveda also Krishna Yajurveda	1st millennium BCE
Niralamba Upanishad	34	Shukla Yajurveda	Late medieval text
Shukarahasya Upanishad	35	Krishna Yajurveda	
Vajrasuchi Upanishad	36	Samaveda	Likely in the 8th-century
Atmabodha Upanishad	42	Rigveda	
Skanda Upanishad	51	Krishna Yajurveda	
Mudgala Upanishad	57	Rigveda	Post-Vedic
Paingala Upanishad	59	Atharvaveda, and Shukla Yajurveda	Early medieval era
Maha Upanishad	61	Samaveda also in Atharvaveda	
Sariraka Upanishad	62	Krishna Yajurveda	
Ekakshara Upanishad	69	Krishna Yajurveda	
Surya Upanishad	71	Atharvaveda	
Akshi Upanishad	72	Krishna Yajurveda	
Adhyatma Upanishad	73	Shukla Yajurveda	
Savitri Upanishad	75	Samaveda	
Atma Upanishad	76	Atharvaveda	
Pranagnihotra Upanishad	94	Atharva Veda	
Muktika Upanishad	108	All four Vedas	

== List of 24 Samanya Upanishads ==
The list of Samanya Upanishad varies by the scholar. For example, Brahmayogin's list of 24 included Annapurna Upanishad, Maitri Upanishad and Kaushitaki Upanishad as Samanya Upanishads.

== See also ==
- Hindu texts
- Vedas

== Bibliography ==
- Aiyar, K. Narayanasvami (1914). Thirty Minor Upanishads. Archive Organization.
- Deussen, Paul (1997). Sixty Upanishads of the Veda. Motilal Banarsidass. ISBN 978-81-208-1467-7.
- Mahony, William K. (1998). The Artful Universe: An Introduction to the Vedic Religious Imagination. SUNY Press. ISBN 978-0-7914-3579-3.
- Nair, Shantha N. (2008). Echoes of Ancient Indian Wisdom. Pustak Mahal. ISBN 978-81-223-1020-7.
