= The Principal Upanishads =

Book by Sarvepalli Radhakrishnan

- Cover of the 1994 edition
- Author: Sarvepalli Radhakrishnan
- Language: English
- Subject: Upanishads
- Genre: Philosophy; Spirituality
- Publisher: Allen & Unwin; Harper India; others
- Publication date: 1953; 1994; others
- Pages: 958
- ISBN: 81-7223-124-5

The Principal Upanishads is a 1953 book written by Sarvepalli Radhakrishnan (1888–1975), then Vice President of India (and later President of India), about the main Upanishads, which carry central teachings of the Vedanta. Originally published in 1953 by Harper, the book has been republished several times.

All editions have had 958 pages and have used the same title, although the spelling of "Upanishads" has varied slightly between editions and their listing elsewhere (the retroflex "sh" has also been represented as "ṣ" or as "ṣh").

== Outline of book ==
Radhakrishnan's The Principal Upanishads begins with a 129-page introduction, with the following 19 section headers:

General Influence; The Term 'Upaniṣad'; Number, Date and Authorship; The Upaniṣads as the Vedānta; Relation to the Vedas: The Ṛg Veda; The Yajur, the Sāma and the Atharva Vedas; The Brāhmanas; The Āranyakas; The Upaniṣads;

Ultimate Reality: Brahman; Ultimate Reality: Ātman; Brahman as Ātman; The Status of the World and the Doctrine of Māyā and Avidyā; The Individual Self; Knowledge and Ignorance; Ethics; Karma and Rebirth; Life Eternal; Religion.

The largest portion of the book (pp. 147–938) contains Sanskrit originals (in a romanized transliteration, rather than in Devanagari), plus verse-by-verse translations and commentaries on the following Upanishads, in this order:

Translated Upanishads

1. Bṛhadāraṇyaka
2. Chāndogya
3. Aitareya
4. Taittirīya
5. Īṣa
6. Kena

7. Kaṭha
8. Praśna
9. Muṇḍaka
10. Māṇḍūkya
11. Śvetāśvatara
12. Kauśītāki

13. Maitrāyaṇi
14. Subāla
15. Jābāla
16. Paiṅgala
17. Kaivalya
18. Vajrasūcikā

The book also includes two appendices about the perspectives of Rabindranath Tagore and Edmond Holmes on the Upanishads, as well as a selected bibliography (2 pages) and general index (6 pages); all editions also contain a preface by the author (6 pages), dated 1951.

== Reception ==
The book was reviewed in the magazine Newsweek in 1954, soon after it was first published. The reviewer stated that

"The Principal Upanishads"... have now been nicely translated by Sir Sarvepalli Radhakrishnan, Asia's foremost contemporary philosopher, a man as well-versed in Jewish and Christian theology as he is in the cults and culture of the East.... His book includes... a strikingly clear commentary explaining their spirit as well as their literal meaning. (p. 55)

The book was also reviewed in several professional journals, including Journal of Bible and Religion (predecessor to the Journal of the American Academy of Religion), Philosophy, The Journal of Religion, and The Philosophical Review.

Journal of Bible and Religion referred to the book as "Another solid work by India's greatest living philosopher.... Radhakrishnan has selected the eighteen most important [Upanishads]" (p. 152). Philosophy stated that "The Western world was in fact already well provided with translations and critical editions," but that "the value of Radhakrishnan's version... will surely be found to lie in his commentary and the long introductory essay on the teaching of the Upanisads, for therein the Western scholar is given the interpretation of these basic documents of Hinduism reached by one of the finest minds of contemporary India after long years of study both of his people's traditional philosophy and of the thought of the West" (pp. 71–72).

One reviewer of a subsequent translation of the Upanishads by Swami Nikhilananda provided extensive comparison between the two versions.

== Editions ==
The original edition was published by in 1953 in London by Allen & Unwin and in New York by Harper. Editions include:

- New York: Harper (1953), The Principal Upaniṣads
- London: Allen & Unwin (1953), The Principal Upaniṣads
- London: Allen & Unwin (1969), The Principal Upaniṣads
- London: Allen & Unwin (1978), The Principal Upaniṣads, ISBN 0-391-00571-5, ISBN 978-0-391-00571-6
- Oxford, UK: Oxford University Press (1989), ISBN 0-19-562350-9, ISBN 978-0-19-562350-5
- Amherst, New York: Prometheus Books (1992), The Principal Upaniṣads, ISBN 1-57392-548-9, ISBN 978-1-57392-548-8
- New Delhi, India: Indus / Harper Collins India (1994), The Principal Upaniṣads, ISBN 81-7223-124-5, ISBN 978-81-7223-124-8

The book has also been translated into other languages besides English (e.g., Hindi, Delhi: Rajapala, 1981, OCLC 19410015).

As a work of scholarly interest, the Introduction itself has been translated and republished (e.g., Hindi, Delhi: Rajapala, 1990 "Upanishadoṃ kī sandeśa", ISBN 81-7028-087-7, ISBN 978-81-7028-087-3, OCLC 30701903)

== See also ==
- Mukhya Upanishads
