= Mahavakya Upanishad =

Sanskrit text, linked to Atharva Veda

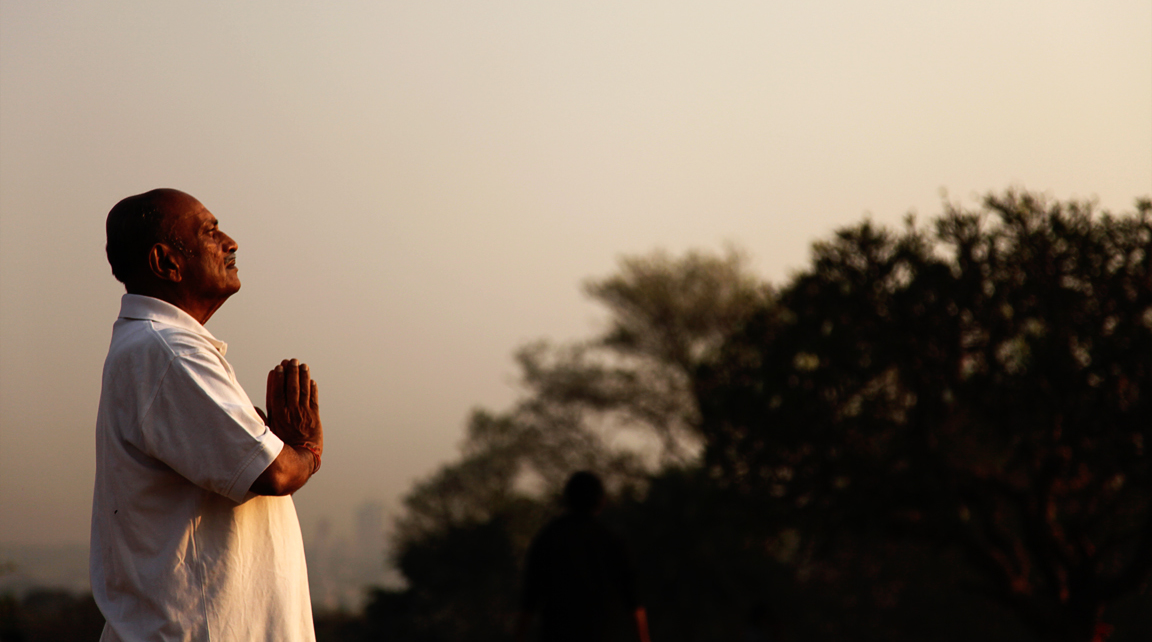
- The soul is like radiant sun, states the text.
- Devanagari: महावाक्य
- IAST: Mahāvākya
- Title means: Great proposition, sacred utterances
- Type: Yoga
- Linked Veda: Atharvaveda
- Chapters: 1
- Verses: 12
- Philosophy: Yoga, Vedanta

The Mahavakya Upanishad (Sanskrit: महावाक्य उपनिषत्, IAST: Mahāvākya Upaniṣad) is a Sanskrit text and one of the minor Upanishads of Hinduism. It is attached to the Atharvaveda, and is classified as one of the 20 Yoga Upanishads. The text describes the nature of Atman (self, soul) and Brahman (ultimate reality), then asserts that they are identical and liberation is the state of fully understanding this identity.

== History ==
Gavin Flood dates this text, along with other Yoga Upanishads, to be probably from the 100 BCE to 300 CE period. In the Telugu language anthology of 108 Upanishads of the Muktika canon, narrated by Rama to Hanuman, it is listed by Paul Deussen – a German Indologist and professor of philosophy, at number 92.

The title of the text refers to Mahavakya, which refers to great summary sentence or sacred utterances found in the Upanishads.

== Contents ==
The Mahavakya Upanishad is a short text that discusses nature of Atman (self, soul) and Brahman (metaphysical reality), their oneness, and the nature of knowledge and ignorance. The text asserts that Yoga and introspection is the way to spiritual knowledge, with the help of a guru. The Upanishad is notable for characterizing Vedic rituals and chasing sensual pleasures as a mark of darkness within, that this darkness can be shed with the radiance of knowledge, the discovery of self as light. This, states the text, is why yoga is started with Gayatri mantra and yogins assert "hamsa-so'ham" (I am he, he is I). Supreme self is satcitananda, or "truth-consciousness-bliss", states the Upanishad. There is no other means to liberation other than realizing the identity of Atman and Brahman, asserts the text.

What is darkness? what isn't?

Addiction to observing Vedic rituals,
with the objective to fulfill cherished desires,
is darkness.

Atman is not this darkness.

—Mahavakya Upanishad 4–5

The Upanishad asserts that Samadhi while being a yogic accomplishment is not Self-knowledge and moksha, nor is it the dissolution of mind to external objects. The highest state is, translates Ayyangar, oneness with the inmost Brahman. This is when, asserts the text, the yogin fully feels and understands "the radiant knowledge of sun is in me, Shiva is within me, this transcendent radiance in the universe is in me", and such is the conviction with which he attains the union with Mahavishnu within. This is liberation, nothing less, states the Mahavakya Upanishad.

The state of singular self-awareness and consciousness described in Mahavakya Upanishad, states Laurence Rosan, is similar to those found in Chandogya Upanishad, Atmabodha Upanishad, Maitreya Upanishad, Maha Upanishad, Subala Upanishad, Adhyatma Upanishad, Brahmavidya Upanishad and Tejobindu Upanishad. These ideas are also found in Greek Neoplatonic philosophy, states Rosan, particularly the works of 5th-century Proclus.

== See also ==
- Nirvana Upanishad
- Yoga (philosophy)
- Yoga Vasistha
- Yoga Yajnavalkya
