= Brahma Upanishad =

Sanskrit text, linked to Krishna Yajurveda

- Devanagari: ब्रह्म
- IAST: Brahma
- Title means: Brahman
- Date: before 3rd-century CE
- Type: Sannyasa
- Linked Veda: Krishna Yajurveda
- Chapters: 3

Brahma Upanishad (Sanskrit: ब्रह्मोपनिषद्, IAST: Brahmopaniṣad) is an ancient Sanskrit text and one of the minor Upanishads of Hinduism. It is among the 32 Upanishads attached to the Krishna Yajurveda, and classified as one of the 19 Sannyasa Upanishads.

The text has been one of the important Upanishads dealing with Hindu renunciation traditions. It discusses Atma (soul) and its four avasthas (states of consciousness) and four seats; the seats for the purpose of achieving Dhyana (mediation) of the Nirguna Brahman (the formless Brahman). It is presented as a conversation between Sage Pippalada and Shaunaka Mahashala. The Brahma Upanishad is notable, in its third chapter, for rejecting all forms of rituals and external religious observations, and declaring the highest complete state of man is one that is dedicated entirely to knowledge.

In the Telugu anthology of 108 Upanishads of the Muktika canon, narrated by Rama to Hanuman, the Brahma Upanishad is listed at number 11. The text is also referred to as Brahmopanishad.

== Chronology and anthology ==
The date or century in which Brahma Upanishad was composed is unknown. Textual references and literary style suggest that this Hindu text is ancient, composed before the Ashrama Upanishad which is dated to the 3rd-century CE.

In Colebrooke anthology of 52 Upanishads, popular in North India, the Brahma Upanishad is listed at number 10. In Narayana's anthology of 52 Upanishads, popular in South India, the Upanishad is listed at 10 as well. In later age compilation collection which was brought out in South India, Brahma Upanishad is part of the 108 Upanishads.

== Structure ==
Knowledge is the highest

Whom knowledge is the highest sacred thread,
Whom knowledge the highest aim is,
That wise one has the sacrificial thread,
He is versed in sacrifice, is sacrifice himself.

— Brahma Upanishad Chapter 3

The Brahma Upanishad manuscripts have survived into the modern era in different versions. The divisions and structure of these manuscripts is different, particularly those referred to as "Calcutta and Poona editions", though with similar message. The Telugu language versions exist in two very different versions in terms of size, with one recension splitting the text into Parabrahma Upanishad and Brahma Upanishad.

The most studied version of the manuscript consists of four parts, but presented in three chapters. The four parts are structured as two prose sections and two metered poem sections. The prose sections are the most ancient layer in this Upanishad given their archaic Sanskrit style, while the poetic parts likely added at some later time.

The initial portions of the text contain general speculations not renunciation, which has made scholars such as Narayana question whether it belongs in the text. Starting about mid 2nd chapter and all of the 3rd chapter constitute a treatise on the ancient Hindu tradition of renunciation.

== Contents ==
The text opens with Shaunaka Mahashala – a wealthy householder, meeting Vedic sage Pippalada, calling human body as the "divine city of Brahman (the Supreme One)", and inquiring about how the human body is constituted, what is the source of power found in human body?

=== Brahman is the Self in human body ===
Brahman, states sage Pippala in the text, indeed is the Prana (breath, life-force) and is the Atma (soul). The self's form is the shining Brahman that resides in one's body giving it a glow, and which controls everything. The Brahman is Prana, and the life of the gods that are the vital sensory organs in human body, their beginning and end.

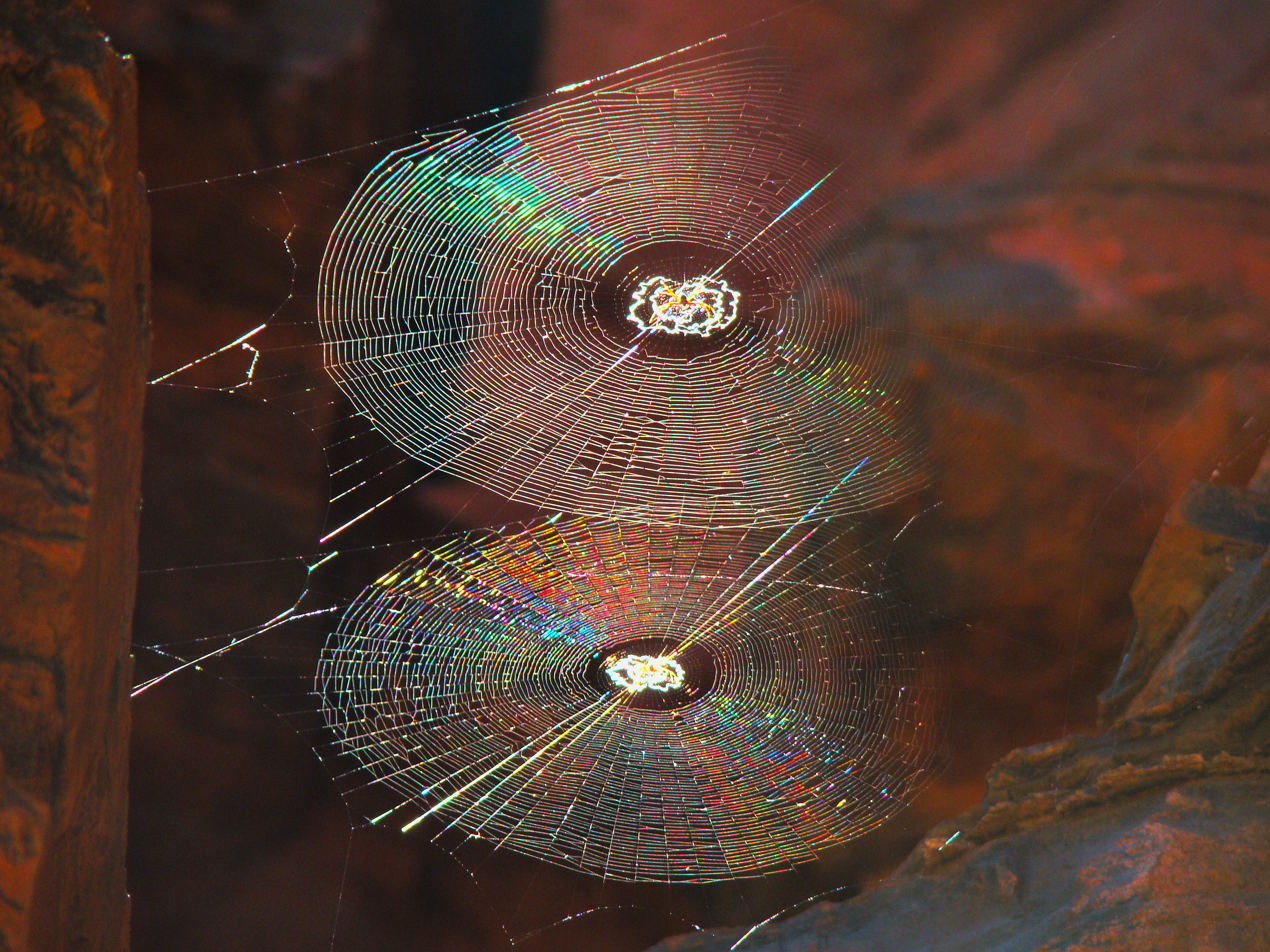
The soul weaves a connection to the gods of sensory organs similar to a spider, states the Brahma Upanishad.

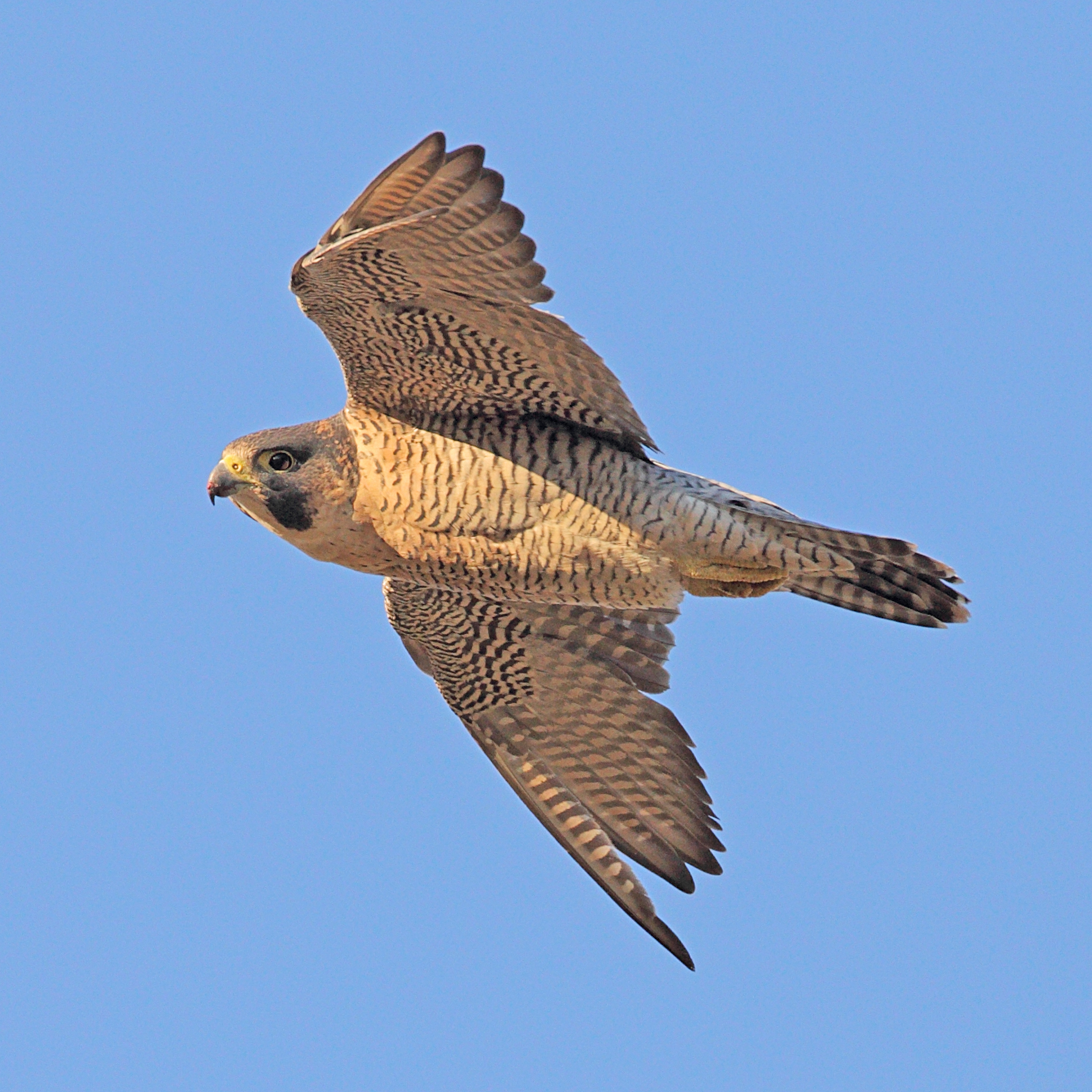
Prana soars to heights when awake and retires during deep sleep, states the text, just like the falcon soars to the skies and returns to its nest in the night.

The Chapter 1 uses many similes using nature to describe how the soul and the human body interact. The Brahman (Atman) leads all these gods within the human body, and they follow him, asserts the text, in a way similar to bees and queen-bee. They do and focus on what the Atman wants. He connects a web with them, and withdraws within itself like a spider. In a similar way, Prana spreads out into arteries in the temple that is human body and also retracts when it wants to. When the human body goes into deep sleep, the Prana retires, just like falcon soars to the skies when he wants to and then goes to his nest to retire.

The soul is not affected by rituals and rites, nor by good or evil, states the Upanishad. This soul (Devadatta) is like a child without desires experiencing joy innocently, he loves the highest light, experiences the joy therein.

Like a caterpillar, which moves from its first grass or leaf abode to the next leaf, puts its foot forward to get a firm footing there before leaving its original abode; the Atman moves to its new abode yet retains a footing in the sleeping body. The Atman, states the text, is the source of the Vedas and the gods.

Both Deussen and Olivelle state that the prose in this chapter and many of the similes are fragments and references to earlier Upanishads, such as Mundaka Upanishad 1.1.7 and 2.2.9, Kaushitaki Upanishad at 4.19, Brihadaranyaka Upanishad in section 4.3, and Prashna Upanishad in 2.4.

Brahman, as the Atman, expresses itself when the man is awake, he is the bird, the crab, and the lotus. While the bird and lotus analogy for the human soul is commonly found in Vedic literature, this is the first and isolated mention of crab analogy, states Deussen. It may refer to a lost Upanishad, or Schrader suggests that the chaotic movements of a crab that is difficult to follow, might be implied in the crab simile here.

The Atman is the higher and lower Brahman, the one inspiring the principle of non-harm (Ahimsa), imbuing consciousness into the gods that are sensory organs, he is the swan, he is the self.

=== Four states of consciousness ===
Some South Indian versions of the Brahma Upanishad manuscripts begin here. As Purusha, Brahman has four dwellings or seats which are the navel, the heart, the throat, and the head. From these emanate the four aspects through which Brahman is effulgent. These are the state of wakefulness representing God Brahma; the state of dreaming which denotes God Vishnu; the state of "dreamless sleep" that is Rudra's form; and the "transcendental" imperishable state of Turiyam in which Brahman is supreme.

The Para Brahman (Supreme Brahman) is, states Brahma Upanishad, same as Aditya, Vishnu, Ishvara, Purusha, Prana (human breath, life force), individual Self (soul), and the "god-filled fire inside the Brahman-city of human body" where the highest Brahman shines.

The temple of human body

In the heart are all gods,
In it the vital breaths also,
In the heart is life and light,
And the threefold thread of the world. (Note: Threefold:Sattva, Rajas, Tamas (Guṇa))

— Brahma Upanishad Chapter 2

The shining Brahman state of the Atman has no worlds or non-worlds, no Vedas nor non-Vedas, neither gods nor non-gods, no sacrifices nor non-sacrifices, no mother nor father, no non-mother nor non-father, no relatives no non-relatives, no ascetic nor non-ascetics, neither recluse nor non-recluse, and this one highest Brahman is which shines.

This Atman-Brahman lives in the space of one's heart, but a universe is in it, weaving all we experience. The same soul is ever present in all living creatures, and to know this soul through meditation is to become the highest Brahman. This knowledge is liberation, states the Brahma Upanishad. In this spirit, in this heart, in this consciousness it is.

=== Renunciation ===
Put away the sacred thread and shear off the tied tuft of hair on your head, states the text, as it begins its discussion of renunciation. Abandon the external rites and rituals, and rest in peace with your soul and pursuit of its wisdom, the one who does so has understood the Vedas. Everything in this universe is interwoven into the Atman-Brahman, like rows of pearls upon a string. It is this string a yogin, who understands the truth of yoga, should wear.

Knowledge is the hair-tuft, knowledge is his sacred thread, knowledge to the renouncer is the highest, states the text. Knowledge is the incomparable means of self purification, the state of purity, the means of purification. The Brahmin, translates Deussen, is engaged in Vedic duties wearing the hair tuft and the external sacred thread then doing the ritual works, but it is the one who wears knowledge as his hair tuft and internal sacred thread is the true state of Brahmin.

The Brahma Upanishad then references and includes a fragment from the Shvetashvatara Upanishad chapter 6.11:

The one god, hidden in all the beings,
all-pervading, inner soul of all,
the observer of works, abode of all beings,
witness, knower, alone, without Guṇas.

— Brahma Upanishad Chapter 3,

Self-knowledge

The all pervading Atman,
Like butter concealed in milk,
In self-knowledge, self-discipline rooted,
Is the final goal of the Upanishad.

— Brahma Upanishad, Closing verses

The sage is within, one's own soul, and those who know this have eternal peace, asserts the text. One should make one's Self as lower churn-stick (fire stick), the Om the upper churn-stick, then rub them through meditation to see the godly latent fire within. Just like there is butter in milk, oil in seeds, water in streams, fire hidden in dormant churn-stick, there is Atman within to be found.

Through meditation and with such wisdom, asserts the text, one's soul unites itself with the supreme soul. This journey is twilight worship.

== See also ==
- Aruni Upanishad
- Jabala Upanishad
