= Paingala Upanishad =

Sanskrit text

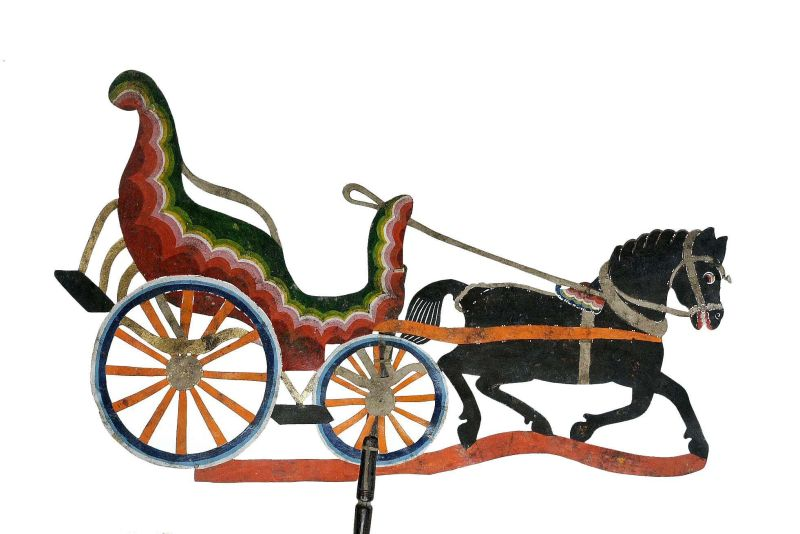
- The text repeats the Vedic metaphor of a horse-drawn car and rider for human body and soul
- Devanagari: पैङ्गल
- IAST: Paiṅgala
- Title means: Name of Yajnavalkya's student, Vedic school
- Date: Unclear,
- Type: Samanya
- Linked Veda: Yajurveda
- Chapters: 4
- Philosophy: Vedanta

The Paingala Upanishad (Sanskrit: पैङ्गल उपनिषत्, IAST: Paiṅgala Upaniṣad) is an early medieval era Sanskrit text and is one of the general Upanishads of Hinduism. It is one of the 22 Samanya (general) Upanishads, and its manuscripts survive in modern times in two versions. The shorter version of the manuscript is found attached to the Atharvaveda, while the longer version is attached to the Shukla Yajurveda. It presents a syncretic view of Samkhya and Vedanta schools of Hindu philosophy.

== History ==
The date or author of Paingala Upanishad is unclear, but given its style and the texts it references, because the 8th-century scholar Adi Shankara refers to it in his bhasya (review and commentary) on Brahma Sutras.

Manuscripts of this text are also found titled as Paingalopanisad. In the Telugu language anthology of 108 Upanishads of the Muktika canon, narrated by Rama to Hanuman, it is listed at number 59. This text is among the Upanishads which were included in the collection of fifty Upanishads that were compiled and translated into Persian by Sultan Mohammed Dara Shikhoh in 1656, under the title Oupanekhat. The Persian version itself was translated into Latin by the French scholar Anquetil Duperron and who then introduced the collection to the scholars of Europe. However, states Deussen, this text exemplifies the liberties and serious translation inaccuracies in the Shikoh's Oupanekhat.

== Contents ==
The Upanishad comprises four chapters, and it is presented as a discourse from the Vedic sage Yajnavalkya to his student Paingala, who has lived at Yajnavalkya's Gurukul (school) for 12 years of studies. The Upanishad quotes from the Vedas, the Principal Upanishads such as the Katha Upanishad and early medieval era Hindu Smriti texts.

God is within

One who has pure heart,
and has become pure spirit,
should say, "I am he" with patience,
"I am he" with patience.

—Paingala Upanishad (Tr: Deussen)

The first three chapters of the text are a general discussion of the Hindu cosmology found in Rigveda that the universe started from nothing, along with the theories of Samkhya school of Hindu philosophy. The text asserts that the universe originated from Sat (Truth, Reality, Be-ness) as changeless Brahman only, and had no material manifestation. It then divided itself into Purusha (spirit) and Mula-Prakriti (matter), states the text. The Purusha-Brahman is changeless Vishnu (Ishvara), while the ever changing reality became five Koshas (covering of Atman) manifesting as Maya (illusion).

The theories in chapter 1 and the first part of chapter 2 of the text, represented an expansion of the then mainstream ideas on the nature of Atman and of reality, states Goudriaan, possibly influencing those found in later Tantra traditions. The Upanishads such as Paingala, states Cohen, formed one of the basis for tantra philosophy by defining "microcosm and macrocosm" in relation to the anatomical elements and mystical physiology of a human being.

In second part of chapter 2 and thereafter, the text describes the human body as the changing reality, Jiva-Atman as the Brahman within the body that is changeless. Ignorance (Avidya, Ajnana) makes people attached to the body and forget the Jiva. Bondage occurs because of non-inquiry into self, translates Parmeshwaranand, while moksha is realized through inquiry, and with the understanding that Brahman and Atman (soul, self) are non-different. Chapter 3 of the text, states Radhakrishnan, asserts that one must meditate on "That thou art" and "I am Brahman", and thus reach the knowledge that Brahman is non-distinct from the self (Atman). Samadhi, asserts the Upanishad, is Atman-darshan (a visit to or view of one's soul).

In the fourth chapter, the text repeats the Vedic metaphor for body-soul as a man in a horse-drawn car. The body is the car, intelligence is the driver, mind the reins, sensory organs are the horses, sense objects the road, and the soul is the traveller in this car. What matters is self-knowledge, states the text, and not whether one dies in a holy place or the house of someone who eats dogs-flesh. The man, who has become one with the Brahman (ultimate reality) and imbued with the "fire of knowledge", rejects all rituals and needs no customs, he has outgrown the world of illusion and realized the truth, "I am He" (So'ham). The state of liberation, states the Upanishad, is the complete understanding of oneness between individual soul with the Absolute Self.

The Paingala Upanishad is notable for one of the earliest elaboration of the idealism theories about Maya (illusion). It includes a discussion of the four states of consciousness, similar to those found in Mandukya Upanishad of Hinduism and in early Buddhist texts. The text, states Krishnan, defines the highest reality Brahman as Satyajnananandam, or "Truth, Knowledge and Bliss", compared to competing Hindu ideas of Brahman as Satcitananda or "Truth, Consciousness and Bliss". The text notably reaches the same non-dualism conclusions in chapter 4, as in other Hindu classics, that liberation (moksha) is the state where the individual realizes, "I am indeed the Brahman, the eternal, undying Self that is within me and also within all beings; there is nothing else apart from Brahman".

The Upanishad, states Radhakrishnan, describes the state of inner insight as when the sense of duality has vanished, when the transcendent Brahman is sensed within oneself and as well established in everyone, everything. The liberated individual feels limitless and one with the universal self.

== See also ==
- Atma Upanishad
- Jabala Upanishad
- Kaushitaki Upanishad
- Mandukya Upanishad
