= Sariraka Upanishad =

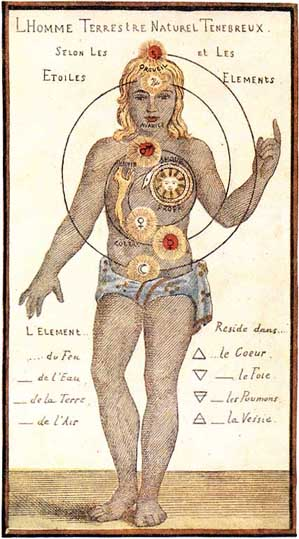
- The Sarira (body) and elements
- Devanagari: शरीरक or शारीरक
- Title means: Body
- Type: Samanya
- Linked Veda: Krishna Yajurveda

The Sariraka Upanishad (Sanskrit: शारीरक उपनिषत्, IAST: Śārīraka Upaniṣad) is one of the minor Upanishads and is listed at 62 (in the serial order in the Muktika enumerated by Rama to Hanuman) in the modern era anthology of 108 Upanishads. Composed in Sanskrit, it is one of the 32 Upanishads that belongs to the Krishna Yajurveda, and is classified as one of the Samanya (general), and is one of several dedicated mystical physiology Upanishads.

The Upanishad, along with Garbha Upanishad, focuses on what is the relation between human body and human soul, where and how one relates to the other, and what happens to each at birth and after death. These questions and various theories are mentioned in the earliest Upanishads of Hinduism, the theories evolve, but Sariraka and other mystical physiology Upanishads are dedicated to this discussion. The texts, states Paul Deussen, have been revised in later era and their corrupted content is inconsistent across known manuscripts.

The text asserts that the human body is a composite of elements from earth, water, air, space (akash), and energy (agni, fire); and that the human soul (jīva) is "the lord of the [human] body". It then describes how human sensory organs arise from these, how functions such as human will, doubt, memory, intellect, copulation, speech, anger, fear, delusion, right conduct, compassion, modesty, non-violence, dharma and other aspects of life arise. The Sariraka Upanishad states that Prakriti (inert but always changing nature) consists of eight native forms, fifteen functional modifications, for a total of twenty-three tattva. It adds that the twenty fourth tattva in human body is avyakta (undifferentiated cosmic matter), asserting the individual soul functions as Kshetrajna ("the lord of the body") and the Purusha (indestructible universal principle, unchanging cosmic soul) is different and greater than the twenty four tattvas.

== Etymology ==
The term śārīraka literally means "relating to the constitution of body and its parts" and "doctrine about the body and soul". The text is also called Sharirakopanishad (Sanskrit: शारीरकोपनिषत्).

== Structure ==
The text consists of one chapter, which begins with a long prose prologue presenting a theory of human physiology, followed by eight verses. Verses 1 through 4, as well as 6 through 7 are metric, while the 5th verse is longer and presents the theory of three Guṇas and four states of consciousness. The last verse asserts that Purusha is supreme.

== Contents ==
=== What constitutes the body? ===
The Upanishad opens with the declaration that a body is a composite of pṛiṭhvī or earth and four primordial elements (mahābhūṭas) – agni or fire, vayu or air, apas or water, and akasha or cosmic space. It asserts that whatever is hard in any living body is the essence of earth; that which is fluid part is the essence of water; the hot in a body is the essence of fire; that which moves is essence of air; and the openings or pores in the body is of the essence of cosmic space.

=== Jñānenḍriyas: the sensory organs ===
Shariraka Upanishad refers to the sensory organs as jñānenḍriyas (organs to know). It links them to the elements as follows: the ear is attributed to space and both as essential to the sense of sound; the skin as essence of vayu, for touch; the eye is associated with fire with characteristics to know form; the tongue as essence of water, for taste; and nose as essence of earth, for smell.

=== Karmenḍriyas: the organs of action ===
The text refers to the functional organs as karmenḍriyas (organs of action). These are of two types, external and internal, suggests the text. The external organs of action include the mouth as the organ of speech; the hands to lift; the legs to walk, the organs of excretion to remove bodily waste, and the organs of procreation to enjoy.

The internal organs of action are called Anṭaḥkaraṇa, comprising four types namely: Manas or mind for Sankalpa-vikalpa (free will and doubt); Buddhi or intellect for discernment and understanding; Ahamkara or ego for sense of self (egoism); and chitta or mental faculty for memory. The body parts where these four antahkaranas reside, asserts the text, are as follows: mind is at the end of the throat; intellect behind the face; ego in the heart; and chitta emanates from the navel.

=== Physiology of the body ===
The Sariraka Upanishad maps the various empirical physiology and sensory functions to its theory of constitutional elements as follows:

Elements and human anatomy, physiology
Element	Sanskrit name	Physiology	Functional role
Earth	Prithvi	Bone, skin, nadis (vessels), nerves, hair and flesh	Sound, touch, form, taste, smell
Water	Apas	Blood, phlegm, urine, shukra (semen) and sweat	Sound, touch, form, taste
Fire	Agni	Hunger, thirst, need for rest, greed and need to copulate	Sound, touch, form
Air	Vayu	Walking, eyelid movement, vocal cords, scratching	Sound, touch
Space	Akash	Desire, anger, avarice, delusion and fear	Sound

=== Psyche and character ===
The Upanishad adopts the Samkhya theory of three Guṇas or innate qualities, as being present in all beings. These three gunas are called: sattva (goodness, constructive, harmonious), rajas (passion, active, confused), and tamas (darkness, destructive, chaotic).

अहिंसा सत्यमस्तेयब्रह्मचर्यापरिग्रहाः । अक्रोधो गुरुशुश्रुषा शौचं सन्तोष आर्जवम् ॥ १॥
अमानित्वमदम्भित्वमास्तिकत्वमहिंस्रता । एते सर्वे गुणा ज्ञेयाः सात्त्विकस्य विशेषतः ॥ २॥

Non-violence, truthfulness, non-stealing, Brahmacharya, Aparigraha, non-anger, serving the Guru, shaucha (purity in mind and body), santosha (contentment), Arjava, abstinence from arrogance, simplicity (non-pompousness), astika (faith in Self, belief in God), and avoiding being cause of injury to others – these Guṇa (qualities, character, psyche) are generally known in particular as Sattvic.

— Sariraka Upanishad, 1.1–1.2

The focus on "I", without consideration of its effect on other living beings, such as "I am the actor, I am the enjoyer" are considered Rajasic guna by those who have realized Brahman knowledge, states the text. The Tamasic guna are those related to the psyche that continues sloth, theft, craving, delusion and destruction. Those with preponderance of Sattvic nature seek spirituality, divine and self-knowledge, asserts the Sariraka Upanishad in verse 1.5, while those with dominating Rajas psyche seek knowledge of dharma, while those who seek destructive knowledge are Tamasic.

=== Four states of consciousness ===
The text posits the same four states of consciousness or avasthas as found in Mandukya Upanishad and Buddhist texts. It defines the four states as Jāgraṭa (waking state), Svapna (dreaming state), Sushupṭi (dreamless sleeping state), and Turiya (pure consciousness). The text then attempts to link its physiology theory to explain these four states of consciousness as follows: in the Jāgraṭa state the 14 organs of the body which come into play are five organs of sense, five organs of action, and the four internal organs. Svapna or dreaming state shuts off all ten external organs, and only the four internal organs are operative states the Upanishad. In Sushupṭi, everything is silent, except chiṭṭa or mind only. Ṭuriya avastha is exclusively about jiva (life force, soul immersed in itself).

=== Soul and Purusha ===
The liberated person is one, states the Sariraka Upanishad, who is aware of Turiya-state jiva (soul), while awake, or while dreaming, or while dreamless sleeping. This is the Jīvāṭmā and Paramāṭmā state of a person. The Upanishad state that soul is the Ksheṭrajña, or "the lord of the body". The subtle elements of a body are seventeen, eight are Prakritis, fifteen are functional modifications of the eight Prakritis. The Upanishad summarises the 24 tattvas which includes Avyakta (the "undifferentiated matter"), as five organs of sense, and eight pertaining to prakriti or nature which further includes 15 modified forms. In verse 1.8, the text states that the Purusha is different and above than the twenty four tattvas.

== Bibliography ==
- Deussen, Paul; Bedekar, V.M. (tr.); Palsule (tr.), G.B. (1 January 1997). Sixty Upanishads of the Veda. Motilal Banarsidass. ISBN 978-81-208-1467-7.
- Ramamoorthy, Dr. H.; Nome (2000). The Song of Ribhu: The English Translation of the Tamil Ribhu Gita. Society of Abidance in Truth. ISBN 978-0-9703667-0-2.
- Tinoco, Carlos Alberto (1997). Upanishads. IBRASA. ISBN 978-85-348-0040-2.
