= Ekakshara Upanishad =

Minor Upanishad of Hinduism

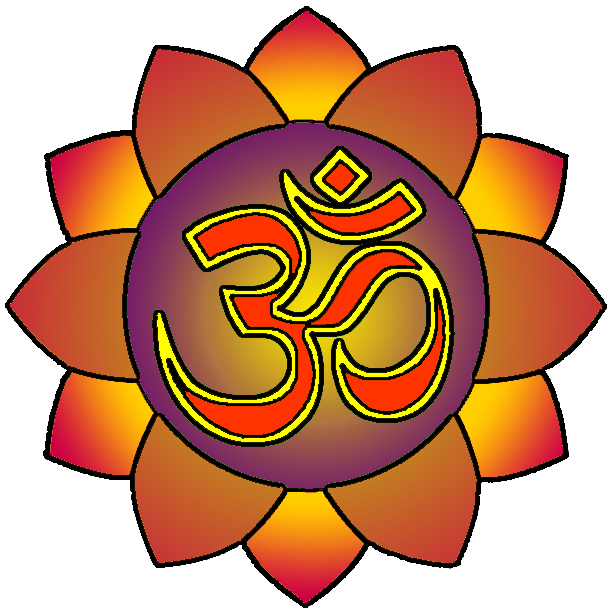
- The text presents Om as the one syllable, metaphysical truth Brahman
- Devanagari: एकाक्षर
- IAST: Ekākshara
- Title means: One imperishable syllable
- Type: Samanya
- Linked Veda: Krishna Yajurveda
- Chapters: 1
- Verses: 13
- Philosophy: Vedanta

The Ekakshara Upanishad (Sanskrit: एकाक्षर उपनिषत्; IAST: Ekākshara Upaniṣat), also titled Ekaksharopanishad (Sanskrit: एकाक्षरोपनिषत्), is a minor Upanishadic text of Hinduism written in Sanskrit language. It is attached to the Krishna Yajurveda, and is a Samanya (general) Upanishad.

The Upanishad discusses Om (Pranava) as the Ultimate Reality Brahman, equating it to the imperishable truth and sound, the source of the universe, the Uma, the Shiva, the Narayana, the Atman (soul) that resides in one's heart. The one immortal syllable (Ekakshara), is described in the text as the Hiranyagarbha (the golden fetus, the sun, Brahma), the manifested universe, as well as the guardian of the universe.

== History ==
Ekakshara, literally "the one syllable", refers to Om of Hinduism. It refers to the primordial sound, the seed, the source of the empirically observed universe, representing the totality of manifested changing cosmos and the unchanging supreme reality Brahman. The term Upanishad means it is knowledge or "hidden doctrine" text that belongs to the corpus of Vedanta literature collection presenting the philosophical concepts of Hinduism and considered the highest purpose of its scripture, the Vedas.

Manuscripts of this text are also found titled as Ekaksaropanisad. In the Telugu language anthology of 108 Upanishads of the Muktika canon, narrated by Rama to Hanuman, it is listed at number 69.

== Contents ==
This Upanishad, presented in 13 verses, is dedicated to Ekaksara. The Ekaksara is a compound of Ek (one) and Aksara (syllable), or the imperishable syllable in Hindu tradition, the Om. The text follows the Sabda-brahman tradition. One of the earliest mention of Ekaksara as OM, the cosmic sound, it being Brahman and the source of the universe, is found in verses 6.22-6.23 of the Maitri Upanishad, as well as in the Brahmana layer of the Vedic literature.

=== The imperishable ===
The text opens declaring Om the Ekakshara as the one imperishable, it is Sushumna (kindest core), it is all that is here, that which is unchanging firm, the primordial source of all, the one that created water wherein life arose, the protector, the only one. The verses 2 and 3 of the Upanishad state that the Ekakshara is the ancient unborn, and the first born therefrom, the immanent truth, the transcendental reality, the one who sacrifices all the time, the fire, the always omnipresent, the principle behind life, the manifested world, the womb, the child from the womb, the cause, and the cause of the causes.

The text asserts that it is the Ekakshara that created the Surya (sun), the Hiranyagarbha the golden womb of everything, the manifested cosmos, the Kumara, the Arishtanemi, the source of the thunderbolt, the leader of all beings. It is the Kama (love) in all beings, states the Upanishad, it is the Soma, the Svaha, the Svadha, the Rudra without suffering in the heart of all beings.

=== The eternal ===
Ekakshara is that which is all pervading, the divine, the bliss of aloneness, the one eternal support, the cleanser, the past of everything, the present of everything and the future of everything, the imperishable syllable, asserts the text. Verse 7 states that the Rigvedic hymns, the songs of Samaveda, the formulas of Yajur originate in this cosmic syllable, it is all knowledge, it is all sacrifice, it is the purpose of all striving. It dispels the darkness, it is the light in which the Devas dwell, it is all knowledge, it is that what is the fulcrum of all beings, it is pure truth, it is that which isn't born, it is sum total of everything, it is what the Vedas sing, it is the Brahman that the knowers know.

=== The one in every being ===
Om, the Ekakshara, is every man, every woman, every boy, every girl, states the Upanishad. It is the king Varuna, the Mitra, Garuda, Chandrama (moon), Indra, Rudra, Tvastr, Vishnu, Savitr, the earth, the atmosphere, the land, the water, the womb of all that is born, that which envelops the world, and the self-born states the text. It is the protector Vishnu, who guides away from what is wrong. It, states the Upanishad in verse 13, is wisdom, is the aim of those who seek wisdom, that which is in the heart of every being, the eternal dwelling innermost self, the golden truth. Thus ends the Upanishad.
