= Principal Upanishads =

Most ancient and widely studied Upanishads of Hinduism

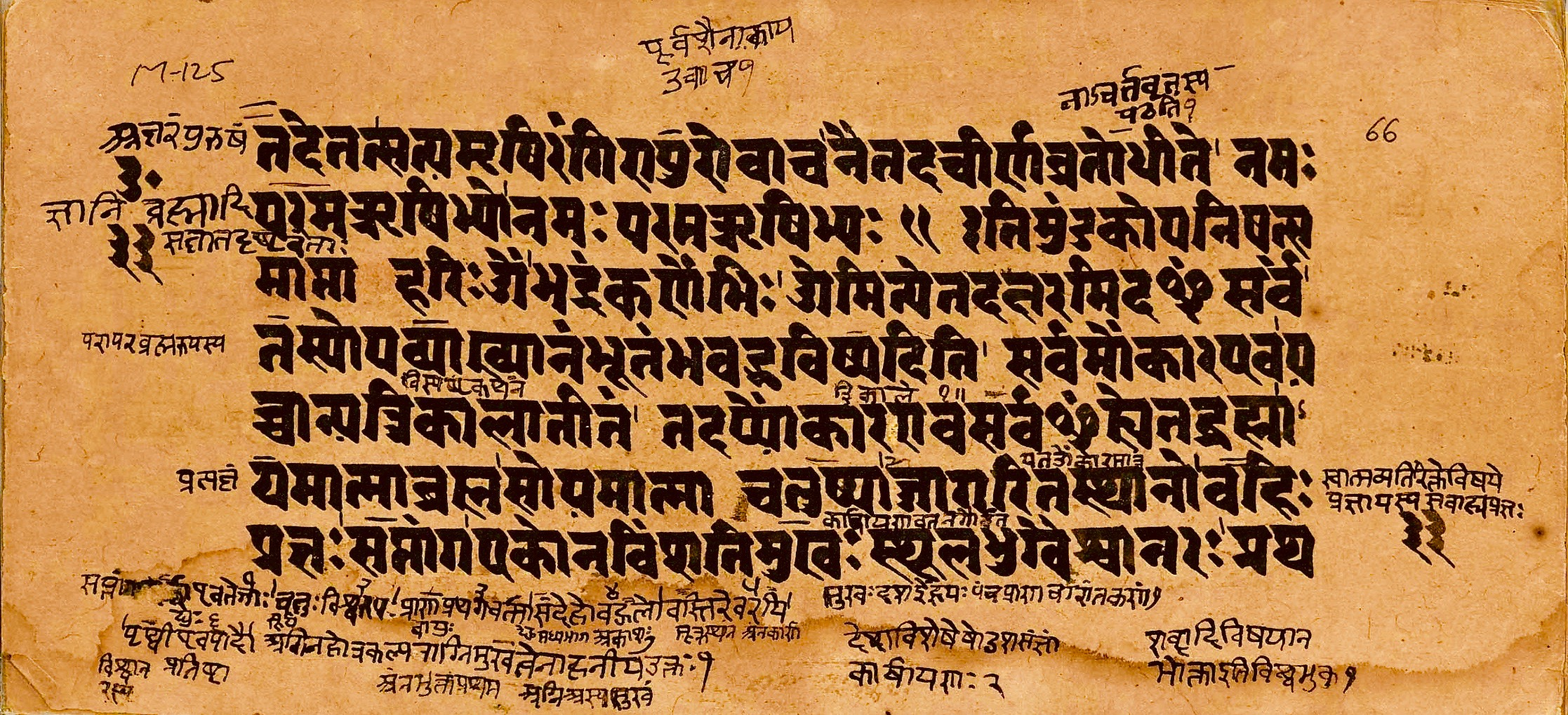
Manuscript of one of the Principal Upanishads - Mandukya Upanishad

The Principal Upanishads, also known as the Mukhya Upanishads, are the oldest and philosophically most influential texts of the larger Upanishad canon in Hinduism. The Upanishads consist of the concluding portion of the Vedas, referred to as Vedanta ("end of the Vedas"). There are hundreds of texts that claim the title Upanishad, however, classical scholarship prioritize a subset of ten (and sometimes thirteen) primary texts.

Commentaries (bhashyas) composed on the Principal Upanishads, along with the Bhagavad Gita and Brahma Sutra, are universally accepted to establish classical Indian philosophies. The Principal Upanishads are geared towards internal contemplation versus external rituals, which aid in the formulation of philosophies regarding the ultimate reality (Brahman), the self (atman), morality (karma), rebirth, and ultimate liberation (moksha).

== Etymology and overview ==
The Upanishads are a vast collection of Sanskrit texts and consist of the concluding portions of the Vedas, the most ancient scriptures of Hinduism. The Upanishads are also referred to as Vedanta, which translates to "the end of the Vedas." Over time, hundreds of texts claimed the title Upanishad, however, tradition dictates a small group of Principal Upanishads, or Mukhya Upanishads. These select Upanishads are consistently regarded as evolving from the Vedas and accepted across all major schools of Indian philosophy. The Principal Upanishads are separated into three categories: early prose, verse, and late prose.

The Sanskrit term mukhya translates to "principal" or "primary." This term distinguishes the selected Upanishads from the larger corpus of scriptures.

== Canon ==
The Principal Upanishads are linked to individually linked to a specific Veda and within the context of its specific recension.

The ten Principal Upanishads and their location in the Vedas are:

1. Īśā (Isha) from the Shukla Yajurveda
2. Kena (Kena) from the Samaveda
3. Kaṭha (Katha) from the Krishna Yajurveda
4. Praśna (Prashna) from the Atharvaveda
5. Muṇḍaka (Mundaka) from the Atharvaveda
6. Māṇḍūkya (Mandukya) from the Atharvaveda
7. Taittirīya (Taittiriya) from the Krishna Yajurveda
8. Aitareya (Aitareya) from the Rigveda
9. Chāndogya (Chandogya) from the Samaveda
10. Bṛhadāraṇyaka (Brihadaranyaka) from the Shukla Yajurveda

At times, some scholarship will expand the list to thirteen texts which include: Śvetāśvatara (Shwetashvatara) Kauṣītaki (Kaushitaki) and Maitrāyaṇīya (Maitrayaniya).

== Philosophical themes ==
The Principal Upanishads shift focus away from external rituals to internal contemplation and inquiry.

A central theme is the investigation into ultimate reality and the true inner self, sometimes known as Brahman and atman, respectively. Early doctrines of action and causation (karma), cycle of birth and death, and liberation (moksha) are also formulated in the Principal Upanishads. Themes of meditation, breath control, and withdrawal of the senses are also found which eventually lead to the establishment of classical Yoga by Patanjali.

== Commentarial tradition ==
The Principal Upanishads have served as a foundational root text for major schools of philosophy. Post-Vedic Indian philosophies developed through the authorship of commentaries (bhashya) on the Principal Upanishads, along with the Bhagavad Gita and Brahma Sutras, collectively known as the Prasthantrayi. Major schools of Vedanta were established through the commentarial tradition.

== Global impact ==
In the early modern period, the Principal Upanishads exerted a global intellectual influence. In 1657, Dara Shikoh, the Mughal prince, translated fifty Upanishads from Sanskrit into Persian titled "Sirr-i-Akbar" (The Greatest Secret).

In the 1800s, Dara Shikoh's Persian translation was later translated into Latin by French Indologist Anquetil-Duperron. This Latin translation impacted German philosopher Arthur Schopenhauer and declared that the Upanishads as "the solace of my life" and predicted they would become central in European studies. The Upanishads have also been known to influence American writers Ralph Waldo Emerson and Henry David Theoreau.
