= Akshi Upanishad =

Minor Upanishad of Hinduism

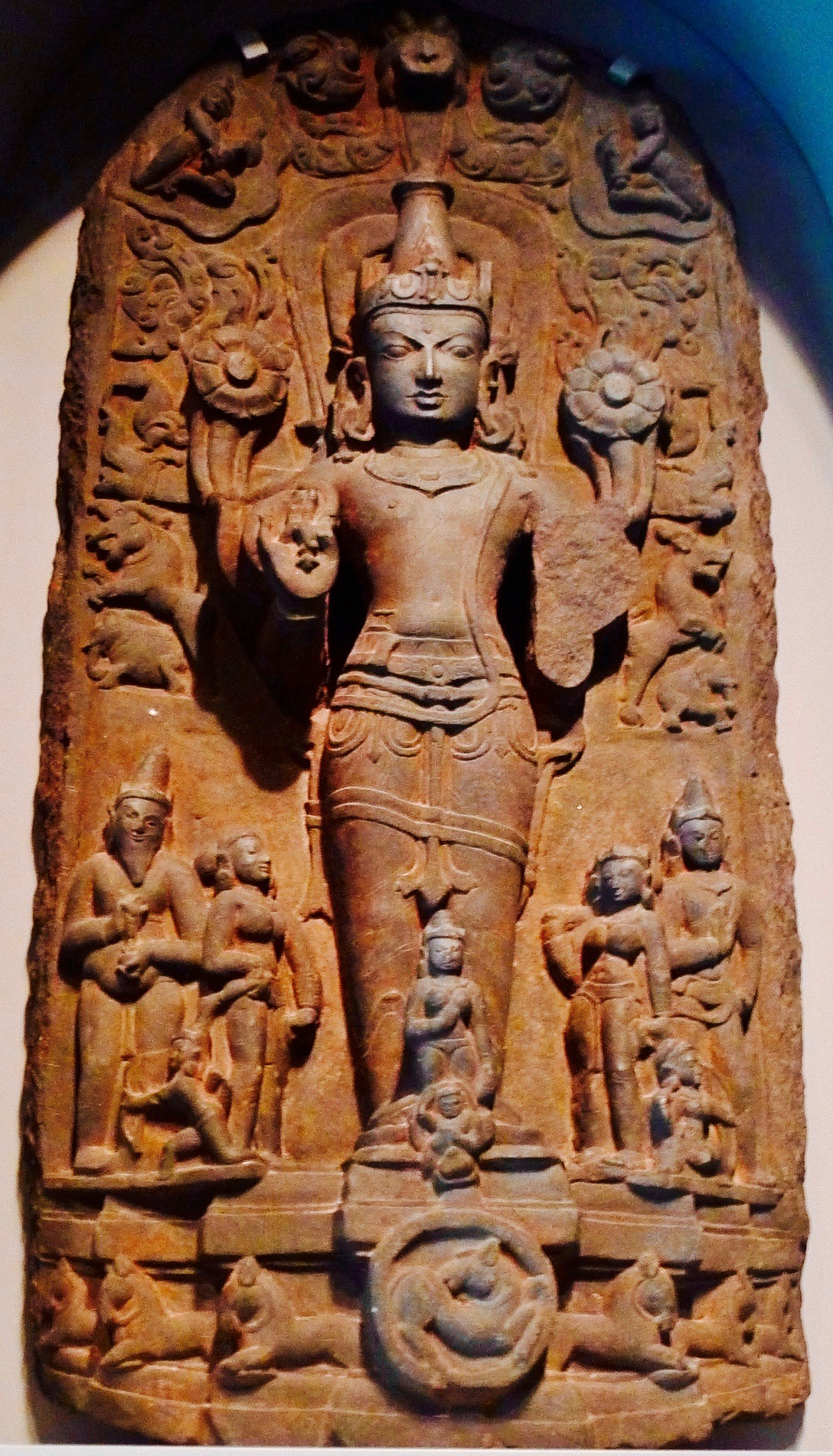
- The Sun god discusses self-knowledge in this text
- Devanagari: अक्षि
- IAST: Akṣi
- Title means: Eye, that which exists
- Type: Samanya
- Linked Veda: Krishna Yajurveda
- Chapters: 2
- Verses: 1st: prose, 2nd: 48
- Philosophy: Vedanta

The Akshi Upanishad (Sanskrit: अक्षि उपनिषत्), also spelled Akshy Upanishad), is a Sanskrit text and one of the minor Upanishads of Hinduism. It is attached to the Krishna Yajurveda, and one of the 21 Samanya (general) Upanishads. The text is structured in two sections, and as a discourse from the Sun god (Surya).

The Upanishad is notable for its Advaita Vedanta themes. The first section of the text presents the Caksusmati-Vidya. The second section discusses nonduality of Atman and Brahman, Yoga, seven steps to reach a dispassionate view of life and freedom, and the Om mantra.

== History ==
The authorship and date of composition of the Akshi Upanishad are unknown. Manuscripts of this text are also found under the title Aksyupanisad. In the Telugu language anthology of 108 Upanishads of the Muktika canon, narrated by Rama to Hanuman, it is listed at number 72.

== Contents ==
The Akshi Upanishad is structured into two khanda (parts, sections). The first part is prose, the second part has 48 verses.

=== Chakshushmati Vidya ===
The first section of the Upanishad opens with an expression of reverence, by sage Samkriti to Surya (Sun). He expresses respect to all three Guṇas in the Samkhya philosophy, with salutations to Sattva, Rajas and Tamas. Then a fragment of hymn from the ancient Brihadaranyaka Upanishad is incorporated by the text, stating,

असतो मा सद्गमय
तमसो मा ज्योतिर्गमय
मृत्योर्मा अमृतं गमय

—Akshi Upanishad khanda 1,
Brihadaranyaka Upanishad 1.3.28
Translation:

From untruth lead us to Truth.
From darkness lead us to Light.
From death lead us to Immortality.

Sun is the one who shows the truth, who scorches ignorance, who cleanses, he is the embodiment of Hamsa (Atman, soul), asserts the Upanishad. Thousand beamed Sun is, a hundred directions does Sun radiate unto, states the text, he is the life-giving energy to all living beings. Embracing the entire universe, in full compassion for all, is this Sun. He empowers the eyes, he brings peace to mind, he moves me, states the Upanishad. Salutations, O Sun! This is the Chakṣuṣmati Vidya, asserts the text, recited by sage Samkriti, to Surya.

=== Brahma Vidya ===
The second section of the Upanishad opens with sage Samkriti asking Sun for Brahma-Vidya (literally, the knowledge of Brahman). The rest of the text contains the answer, structured as a discourse from Surya, wherein the Sun god states that this knowledge leads to liberation and freedom while one is alive (Jivanmukta state).

The ultimate Reality and Truth called Brahman is all, it is one, without origin, the infinite, the quiescent and the constant. To comprehend its true nature, its relation to self, is to reach an inner calm, this is the Brahma-Vidya, and this is the goal of Yoga say those who know, asserts the Upanishad.

Step 1 of Yoga

He is gentle,
He avoids distressing others,
He does not hanker after enjoyment,
His words are affectionate and soft,
He makes himself useful to the virtuous,
by thought, deed and word.

—Akshi Upanishad, khanda 2

The first stage of Yoga, for the one who seeks self knowledge, is detachment day by day, from impressions, from being controlled by one's senses, from being controlled by external things or others. In this stage, the yogi thinks before acting, abstains from engaging in vulgar vices, avoids arguing with others and devotes self to virtues, state verses 2.4 to 2.7 of the text. He is gentle, he never seeks distress for anyone, he uses kind words, he is affectionate to everyone, he helps the virtuous with his deeds, with his words and with his thoughts, states the Upanishad. He studies the Shastras, he reflects on them, he investigates the world of knowledge and himself, in the first stage of Yoga.

According to the Upanishad, the second phase of Yoga involves engaging in inquiry with the guidance of teachers, known as gurus, those who know, and those he admires. He seeks out those who righteous in their life and their past conduct proves so, those who are lucid in explaining ideas, who know the Sruti and Smriti, who understand the rules of reason, proper inferences, correct and incorrect knowledge. He serves such teachers, learns from them, while he continues to cast off his tendencies to vices and cast in his tendencies to virtues, asserts the text.

The third stage of Yoga is the stage of non-concern, states the text. He reads and listens to ideas about Atman (soul, self), in the quiescent environment of hermitages, by walking alone in the woods and peaceful places of nature, bringing his mind where he is not concerned by anything other than his frame of mind. The state of non-concern is of two kinds, asserts the Upanishad. One is about non-clinging to things, or to one's past karma, or to one's anxiety about the future. The other is about non-clinging to one's assumption about one's soul, self. The first is called ordinary non-concern, states the text, while the latter is called extraordinary non-concern.

The fourth stage of Yoga, according to Akshi Upanishad, is eliminating ignorance and incorrect knowledge from within. This includes realizing the flaws in dualism, understanding what is constantly changing and what is unchanging constant, states the Upanishad.

The fifth stage of Yoga, states the text, is awakening state. This is the state of learning about the self, the non-dual state (Advaita), arousing the inward consciousness, of correct knowledge in within, where one functions in the empirical world and also fully aware of oneself.

The text presents the sixth stage of Yoga as the Turiya state. Therein, asserts the text, he learns and realizes a consciousness where there is neither absence of individuality nor is there the arrogance of ego. He is without fear, without incorrect knowledge about the world around him and the world within him, he has no fancies or delusions about either. He is now a Jivanmukta, has the Brahma-vidya, states the Upanishad.

The seventh and last stage of Yoga is the Videha-mukti state, one the Jivanmukta arrives naturally with time. Here, he accepts and is content with the prospect of his death someday, because he already has the Brahma-vidya.

=== The Omkara and Brahman ===
The Omkara (A-U-M) is the sign for the Viswa (world) and Prajna (wisdom) of nondual Brahman and Atman, states the Upanishad in verses 2.43- 2.48. The "A" in A-U-M signifies the world, the "U" signifies Taijasa (brilliance, the light), while the "M" signifies the wisdom. This is the realization where the yogi fully comprehends, "I am the Vasudeva", that the Atman is transcendent bliss and eternal, the pure, the nondual and the Om. It is the Om, asserts the text, which reminds one of the real existent, the glory of that which is beyond the darkness of ignorance, blissful, the flawless, the wisdom, "the ultimate reality Brahman is me". Thus ends the Upanishad.

== See also ==
- Paramahamsa Upanishad
- Nirvana Upanishad
- Yogatattva Upanishad
