= Mantrika Upanishad =

Minor Upanishad of Hinduism

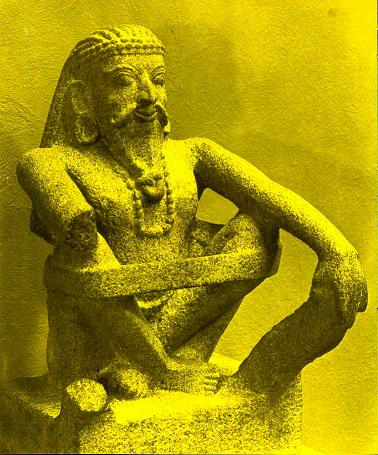
- Mantrika Upanishad is one of the earliest theistic yoga texts
- Devanagari: मन्त्रिक
- IAST: Māntrika
- Type: Samanya
- Linked Veda: Shukla Yajurveda
- Chapters: 1
- Verses: 21
- Philosophy: Samkhya, Yoga, Vedanta, Bhakti

The Mantrika Upanishad (Sanskrit: मन्त्रिक उपनिषत्, IAST:Māntrika Upaniṣad) is a minor Upanishad of Hinduism. The Sanskrit text is one of the 22 Samanya Upanishads, is part of the Vedanta and Yoga schools of Hindu philosophy literature, and is one of 19 Upanishads attached to the Shukla Yajurveda. In the Muktika canon, narrated by Rama to Hanuman, it is listed at number 32 in the anthology of 108 Upanishads.

The Upanishad comprises 21 verses. It attempts a syncretic but unsystematic formulation of ideas from Samkhya, Yoga, Vedanta and Bhakti. It is therefore treated as a theistic Yoga text. Mantrika suggests the theory, according to Paul Deussen's interpretation, that the universe was created by Purusha and Prakriti together, and various active soul-infants drink from inactive Ishvara soul (God) who treats this as a form of Vedic sacrifice. Dalal interprets the text as giving an exposition on Brahman (changeless reality) and Maya (changing reality, metaphysical illusion). According to the Mantrika Upanishad, "the Brahman dwells in body as soul, and this soul as God changes dwelling thousands of time".

The Mantrika Upanishad is also called Culika Upanishad (Sanskrit: चूलिका उपनिषत्).

== Etymology and classification ==
Mantrika means "enchanter, reciter of spells", while 'Cūlikā' means "tip, summit, top of a column". The basis for the title of the Upanishad is unclear, but may refer to the phrases in the text on "pointed top of a pillar" and its extensive use of mantra metaphors and riddle-like terms from Atharvaveda known partly for its esoteric teachings of spells and enchantment.

Different schools of Hindu philosophy have varied in their classification of Mantrika Upanishad. The 11th-century scholar Ramanuja, of Vishishtadvaita school, for example, quoted from Mantrika Upanishad, but classified Mantrika as an Atharvaveda Upanishad. The anthology in the Muktika Upanishad, however, lists it as attached to the White (Shukla) Yajurveda.

== Chronology ==
The Mantrika Upanishad (or Culika Upanishad), suggested Mircea Eliade, was "probably written at the same period as the Maitri Upanishad, and in it we find the simplest form of theistic Yoga". It is one of the earliest theistic yoga texts. The relative chronology of the text is likely to have been in the final centuries of 1st millennium BCE, contemporaneous with the didactic parts of the Mahabharata, and probably earlier than the Vedanta-sutras and the Yoga-sutras. The Upanishad attempts a synthesis of Samkhya, Yoga, Vedanta and Bhakti devotionalism ideas, but with a hazy syncretism and poor organization, suggesting that the text may be from a period where these ideas were being formulated.

== Structure ==
The text has a poetic structure and has 21 verses. For example, verses 17–18 of the text state,

In him in whom this universe is interwoven,
Whatever moves or is motionless,
In Brahman everything is lost,
Like bubbles in the ocean.

In him in whom the living creatures of the universe,
Emptying themselves become invisible,
They disappear and come to light again,
As bubbles rise to the surface.

— Mantrika Upanishad 17–18, Translated by Paul Deussen

== Contents ==
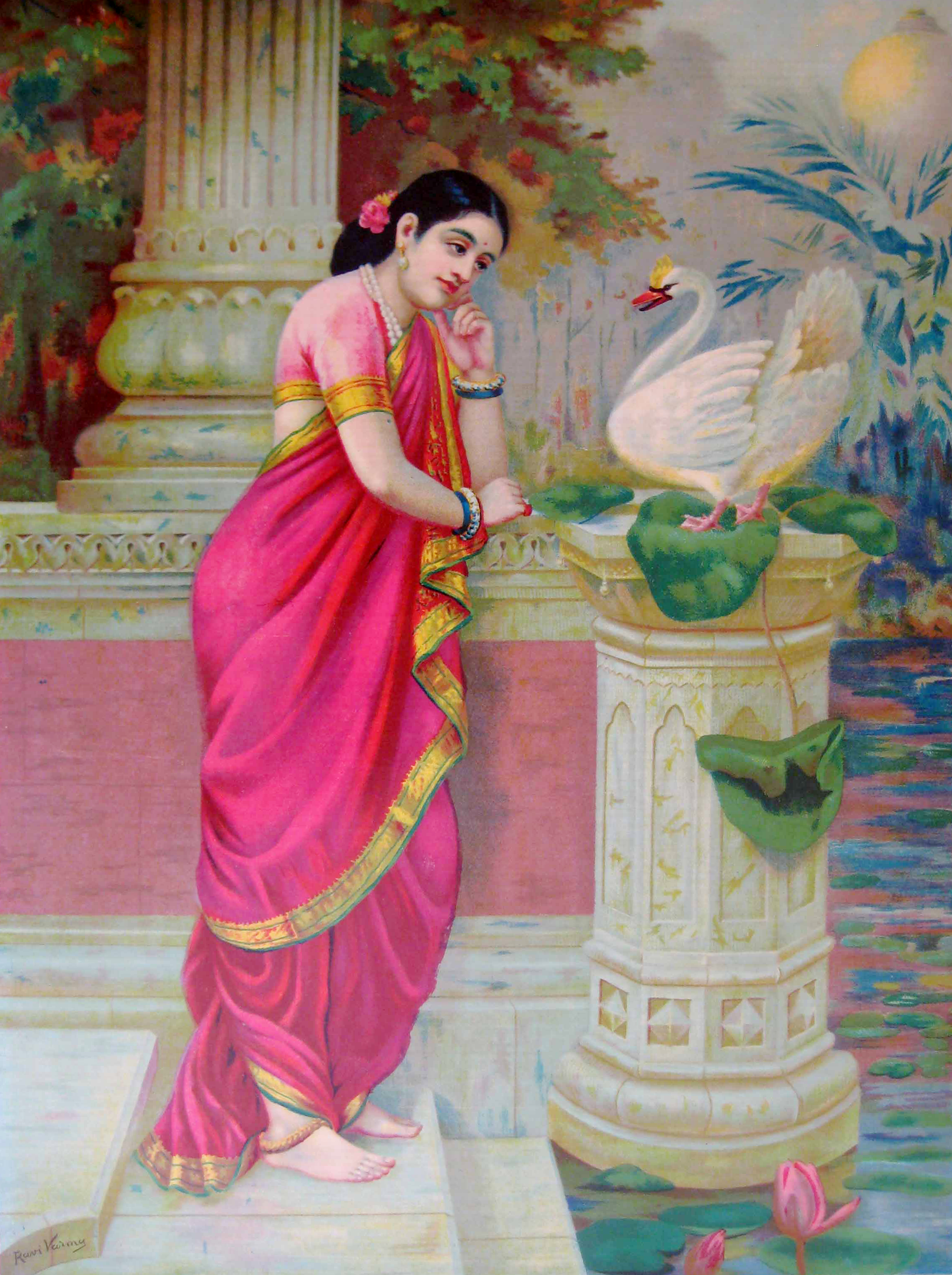
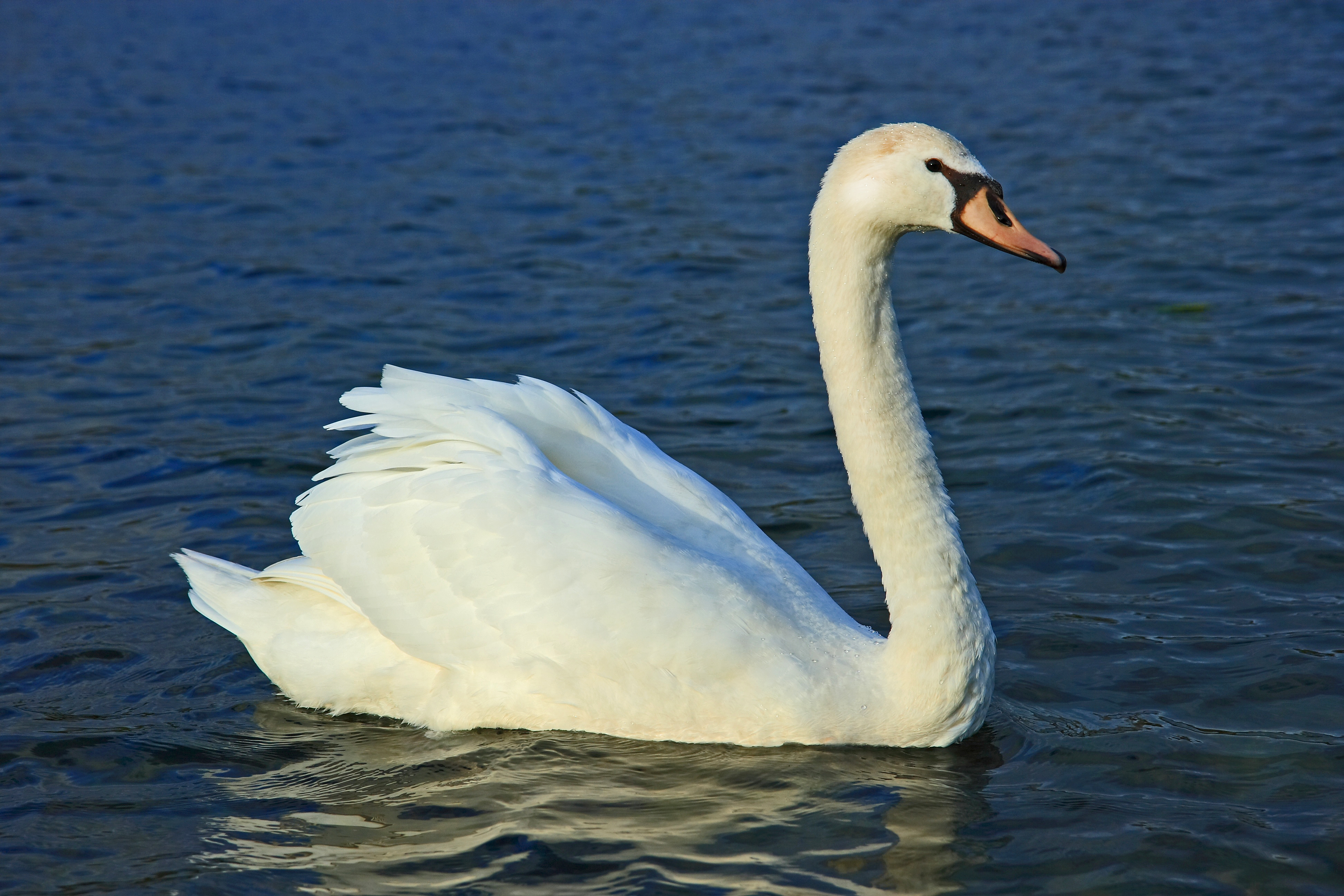
Verse 1 of Mantrika Upanishad describes Atman (soul) as an eight footed Hamsa bird fettered with three strands (Guṇas, innate qualities).

=== Metaphor of Atman as Swan: verses 1–2 ===
The Upanishad opens with a metaphor for soul, as an eight-footed swan bird, with three innate characteristics (Gunas), eternal jewel, radiating in eight regions of the heaven (eight quadrants of sphere):

The bird, radiating, eight footed
Three stranded, eternal jewel,
Having flames of fire, wandering twofold,
Everyone sees him and sees him not.

When at the time of creatures delusion,
The darkness around God is torn,
Then He is seen in the cavern of Gunas,
In Sattvam, by the Gunaless alone.

— Mantrika Upanishad 1–2,

In verse 1, states Deussen, the metaphor is that "everyone sees Him (Purusha) as the sun-bird, and does not see Him as the Atman". The Atman is without qualities (Guna) and perceives this Purusha, as that which develops out of Sattva. In Samkhya philosophy of Hinduism, Sattva is the Guna that is the innate attribute and quality of balance, harmony, goodness, purity, universalizing, holistic, constructive, creative, building, positive, peaceful, virtuous.

=== Metaphor of universe as milch-cow: verses 3–7 ===
In verse 3, states Deussen, Maya (Prakriti, nature) is stated to be the mother of all of the empirical universe, eternal, firm and of eight-fold form. She is impartial, and those who do not know their inner self, exploit her (Prakriti) for their enjoyment. This mother is like a milking cow, the procreatress, states the Upanishad, who generously cultivates all beings, with the three Gunas.

Those driven by their senses are countless, and like infants who drink from this sense-object milch cow, states the text. They enjoy her, but it is soul, states Deussen, who as God (the Ishvara of the theistic yoga system) who experiences and enjoys Prakriti through his thought and deed.

=== Metaphors for Self and Brahman: verses 8–13 ===
The Upanishad, in verses 8 to 9, states that the householders and the sages of Rigveda, Samaveda and Yajurveda recognize the two birds, one which eats the fruit and other which is detached and silently watches. This metaphor – for the Individual and Supreme (Atman, soul) or Prakriti and Purusha – is found in Rigveda verse 1.164.20, and numerous other Upanishads (such as Mundaka Upanishad 3.1.1, Katha Upanishad 1.3.1):

Two birds with fair wings, inseparable companions,
in the same sheltering tree have found a refuge.
One of the twain eats the sweet fig-tree's fruitage,
the other, not eating, just looks on.

— Rigveda 1.164.20,

The Mantrika Upanishad in verses 10–13, quotes from the Samhita and Brahmana of the Atharvaveda (AV), the designations of Brahman, citing sages like Bhrigu and Bhargavas. The series of designations where Brahman is pursued or found, as recited by verses 11 to 13 of the text, include – Brahmacharin (AV 11.5), Vratya or wandering sannyasi (AV 15.1), Skambha or pillar / household (AV 10.7–8), Palita or grey with age (AV 9.9–10), Anadvan or bull (AV 4.11), Rohita or rising red sun-god (AV 13.1.2–3), Ucchista or remaining (AV 11.7), Kala or time (AV 19.53–54), Prana or vital breath (AV 11.4), Bhagavan Atman or the exalted Atman (AV 10.8.44), Purusha (AV 19.6), Sarva-Bhava-Rudra (AV 11.2), Ishvara (AV 19.6.4), Prajapati (AV 4.2), Viraj (AV 8.9.10), Prsni (AV 2.1), and Salilam or primordial waters (AV 8.9.1).

The Mantrika Upanishad, states Maurice Bloomfield, is notable through its verse 10–13, for being an exception in the Upanishadic corpus, that provides an almost complete cryptic catalogue of the cosmogonic and theosophic hymns in Gopatha Brahmana of Atharvaveda.

=== Self, Brahman and Samkhya: verses 14–19 ===
The text in verse 14 acknowledges that Samkhya scholars and Atharvan scholars call him by different names or counts, the former consider him Gunaless person, the latter consider him as the head. The verse 15, similarly acknowledges that some state Brahman and Self to be non-dual, others as dual, some as three-fold, others as five-fold.

The Brahman is seen as One, with eyes of knowledge, everywhere including in the world of plants, states verse 16. It is this Brahman, asserts the Mantrika Upanishad, in whom the universe is woven, and it includes all that moves and all that does not move, from whom the empirical world emerges and into whom all objects ultimately merge. The Brahman dwells in body as soul, states verse 19 of the text, and this soul as God changes dwelling thousands of time (rebirth).

=== Brahman knowledge is for everybody: verses 20–21 ===
In the concluding verses, the Upanishad states that one who teaches this doctrine achieves Avyakta, and any Brahmin or non-Brahmin who knows Brahman achieves liberation and rests in Brahman.

Yea, who, Brāhmaṇā or not,
Knows the Brahman and its commandment,
He disappears, entering,
Into the one who rests in Brahman.

— Mantrika Upanishad 21,

== See also ==
- Chandogya Upanishad
- Maitri Upanishad
- Yoga-kundalini Upanishad
- Yogatattva Upanishad
- Yoga Vasistha

== Bibliography ==
- Dalal, Roshen (18 April 2014). Hinduism: An Alphabetical Guide. Penguin Books Limited. ISBN 978-81-8475-277-9.
- Deussen, Paul; Bedekar, V.M.; Palsule, G.B. (1997). Sixty Upanishads of the Veda, Volume II. Motilal Banarsidass. ISBN 978-81-208-1467-7.
- Nair, Shantha N. (1 January 2008). Echoes of Ancient Indian Wisdom. Pustak Mahal. ISBN 978-81-223-1020-7.
- Rāmānuja; Ramanujachari, V. K. (2004). Elements of Vedic Religion. Cosmo Publications. ISBN 978-81-7755-764-0.
