= Aitareya Upanishad =

One of the ancient Sanskrit scriptures of Hinduism

Aitareya
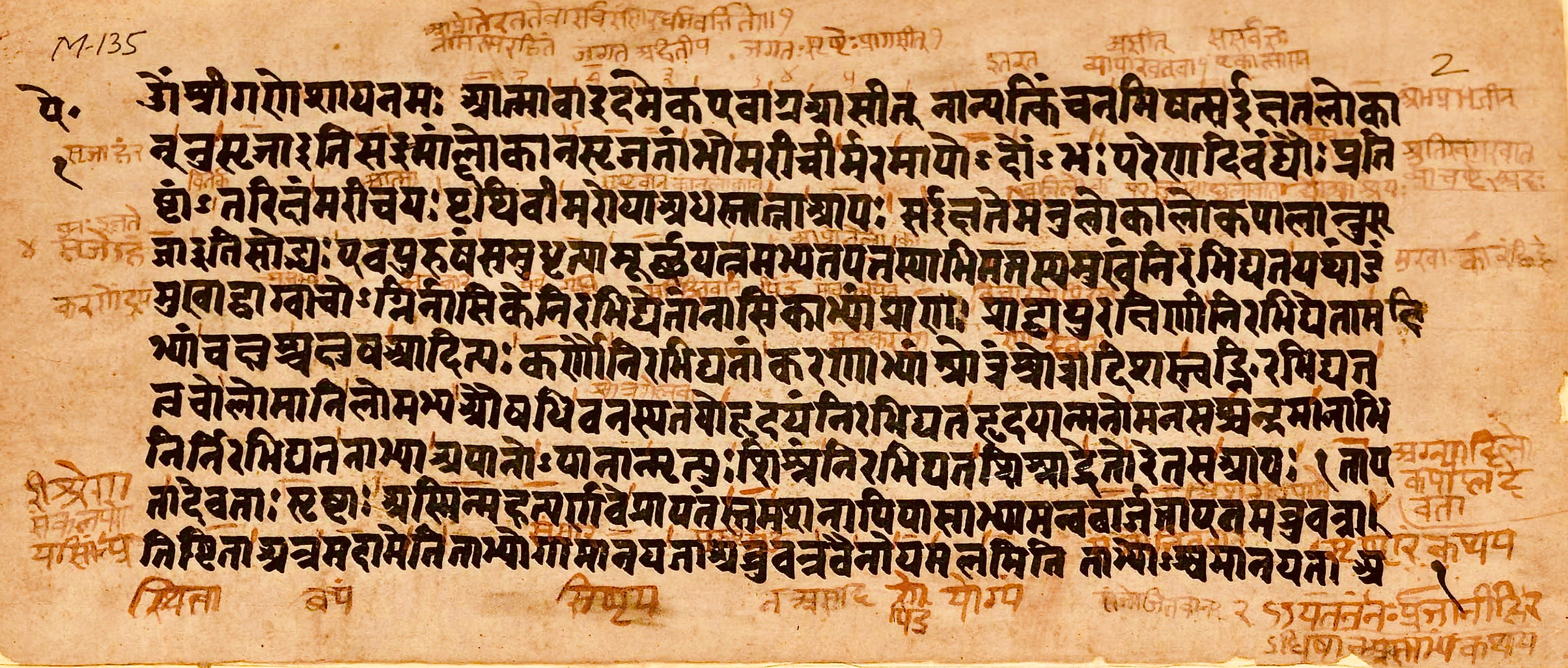
- The Aitareya Upanishad, is found embedded inside the Rigveda. Above: a manuscript page (Sanskrit, Devanagari script)
- Devanagari: ऐतरेय
- IAST: Aitareya
- Date: 1st millennium BCE
- Author(s): Aitareya Mahidasa
- Type: Mukhya Upanishad
- Linked Veda: Rigveda
- Linked Brahmana: Aitareya Brahmana
- Linked Aranyaka: Aitareya Aranyaka
- Chapters: 3
- Verses: 33
- Philosophy: Ātman, Brahman
- Commented by: Adi Shankara, Madhvacharya
- Popular verse: "Prajñānam Brahma"

The Aitareya Upanishad (Sanskrit: ऐतरेयोपनिषद्, IAST: Aitareyopaniṣad) is a Mukhya Upanishad, associated with the Rigveda. It comprises the fourth, fifth and sixth chapters of the second book of Aitareya Aranyaka, which is one of the four layers of Rig vedic text.

Aitareya Upanishad discusses three philosophical themes: first, that the world and man is the creation of the Atman (Universal Self); second, the theory that the Atman undergoes threefold birth; third, that Consciousness is the essence of Atman.

== Chronology ==
According to a 1998 review by Patrick Olivelle and other scholars, the Aitareya Upanishad was likely composed in a pre-Buddhist period, possibly 6th to 5th century BCE.

== Discussion ==
Aitareya Upanishad is a primary ancient Upanishad, and is listed as number 8 in the Muktika canon of 108 Upanishads. Considered one of the middle Upanishads, the date of composition is not known but has been estimated by scholars to be sometime around 6th or 5th century BCE.

The Aitareya Upanishad is a short prose text, divided into three chapters, containing 33 verses.

=== First chapter ===
In the first chapter of the Aitareya Upanishad, Atman is asserted to have existed alone prior to the creation of the universe. It is this Atman, the Self or the Inner Self, that is then portrayed as the creator of everything from itself and nothing, through heat. The text states that the Atman created the universe in stages. First came four entities: space, maram (earth, stars), maricih (light-atom) and apas (ur-water, cosmic fluid). After these came into existence, came the cosmic self and eight psyches and principles (speech, in-breathing, sight, hearing, skin/hair, mind, out-breathing, reproductivity). Atman then created eight guardians corresponding to these psyches and principles. Then, asserts Aitareya Upanishad, came the connective principles of hunger and thirst, where everything became interdependent on everything else through the principle of apana (digestion). Thereafter came man, who could not exist without a sense of Self and Atman. But this sense then began cogitating on itself, saying that "I am more than my sensory organs, I am more than my mind, I am more than my reproductive ability", and then asked (abridged),

कोऽहमिति

Who am I?

— Aitareya Upanishad, Chapter 1, Hymn 11

Paul Deussen summarizes the first chapter of Aitareya Upanishad as follows,

The world as a creation, the Man as the highest manifestation of the Atman who is also named as the Brahman - this is the basic idea of this section.

— Paul Deussen, Aitareya Upanishad, Chapter 1

=== Second chapter ===
In the second chapter, Aitareya Upanishad asserts that the Atman in any man is born thrice: first, when a child is born (procreation); second, when the child has been cared for and loved to Selfhood where the child equals the parent; third, when the parent dies and the Atman transmigrates. The overall idea of chapter 2 of Aitareya Upanishad is that it is procreation and nurturing of children that makes a man immortal, and the theory of rebirth, which are the means by which Atman sustainably persists in this universe.

=== Third Chapter ===
The third chapter of Aitareya Upanishad discusses the nature of Atman. It declares that consciousness is what defines man, the source of all intellectual and moral theories, all gods, all living beings (man, animals, plants), all that there is. Then the Upanishad asserts that the key to the riddle of the Universe is one's own inner self. To know the universe, know thyself. Become immortal, suggests the Aitareya Upanishad, by being you.

Max Muller translates parts of the chapter as follows (abridged),

Who is he whom we meditate on as the Self? Which is the Self?
(...)
Everything are various names only of Knowledge (the true Self)
Everything is led (produced) by knowledge.
It rests on Knowledge. The world is led by Knowledge. Knowledge is its cause.
Knowledge is Brahman.

— Aitareya Upanishad, Chapter 3

Aitareya Upanishad, like other Upanishads of Hinduism, asserts the existence of Consciousness as Atman, the Self or Brahman. It contains one of the most famous expressions of the Vedanta, "Prajnanam Brahma" (Knowledge is Brahman/god/divine/holy), which is one of the Mahāvākyas.

== Sanskrit commentaries ==
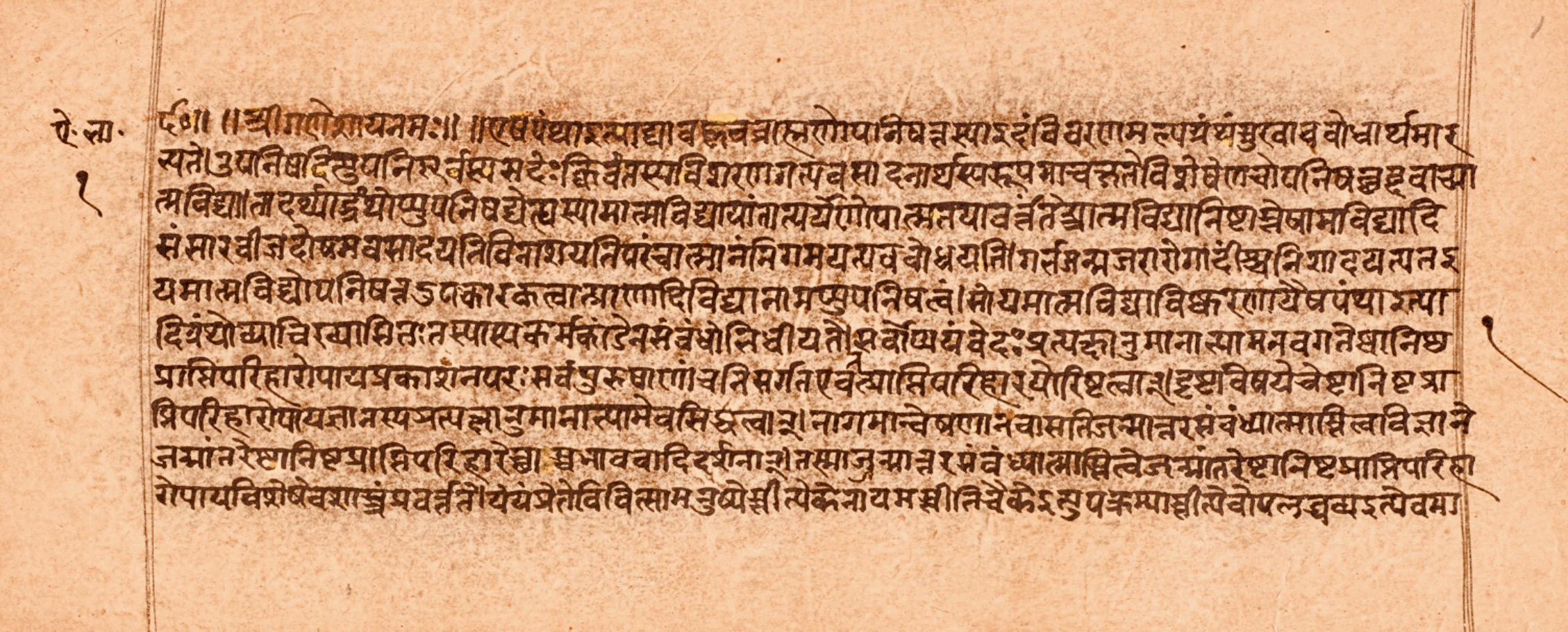
A 1593 CE manuscript page of the Aitareya Upanishad with Adi Shankara's commentary. This Hindu manuscript was preserved by and found in a Jain temple bhandara in Varanasi.

Aitareya Upanishad is one of the older Upanishads reviewed and commented upon in their respective Bhasyas by various ancient scholars such as Adi Shankara and Madhvacharya. Adi Shankara, for example, commented on Aitereya Upanishad, clarifying that some of his peer scholars have interpreted the hymns in a way that must be refuted. The first meaning, as follows, is incomplete and incorrect, states Shankara

This is the true Brahman called Prana (Life force), this is the only God. All the Devas (Gods) are only the various manifestations of this Prana. He who attains Oneness with this Prana attains the Devas.

— Adi Shankara, Aitareya Upanishad Bhasya

Adi Shankara then reminds the reader that the Aitereya Upanishad must be studied in its context, which starts with and states Atma va idam in hymn 1. It doesn't start with, nor does the text's context, mean that "I am alive, thus God". Rather, states Shankara, the context is abundantly clear that one must know, "Atman exists, I am consciousness, and that self-realization of one's Atman, its Oneness with Universal Self is the path to liberation and freedom. Know yourself. Worship yourself." Adi Shankara then explains that rituals, sacrifices, merit-karma (worship) does not lead to liberation, the wise do not perform these and rituals such as Agnihotra, they seek Atman and understanding of their own Being and their own Inner Self, and when one has achieved "Self-knowledge, full awareness of one's consciousness" does one achieve moksha.

== Translations ==
The first English translation was published in 1805 by Colebrooke. Other translators include Max Muller, Paul Deussen, Charles Johnston, Nikhilānanda, Gambhirananda, Sarvananda, Patrick Olivelle and Bhānu Swami (with commentary of Śrī Raṅgarāmānujācārya).

== Authorship ==
The author of the Aitareya Aranyaka and the Aitareya Upanishad has been historically credited to rishi Aitareya Mahidasa.
