= Atmabodha Upanishad =

Ancient Hindu text

Atmabodha
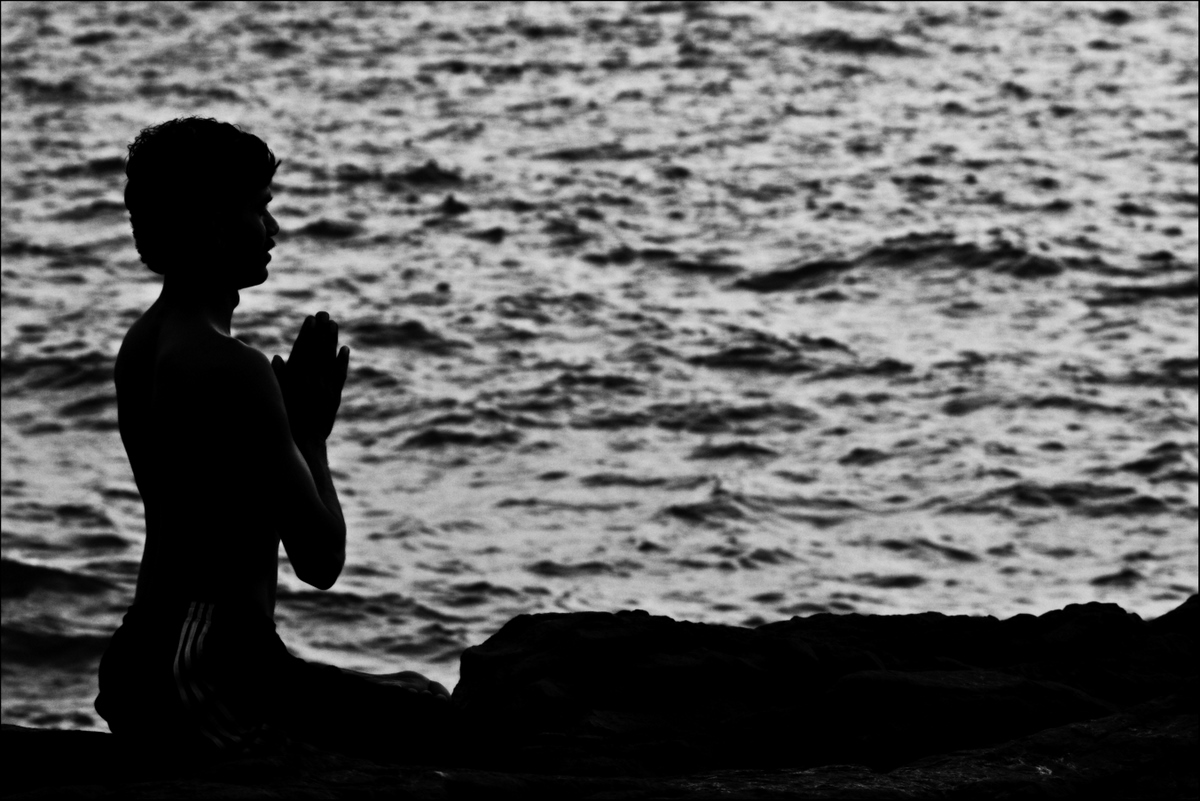
- Just like waves are fashioned in the ocean, all living beings are fashioned in non-dual Brahman, states the text.
- Devanagari: आत्मबोध
- IAST: Āṭmabodha
- Title means: Instruction of the inner self
- Date: अत्मबोध
- Type: Samanya
- Linked Veda: Rig Veda
- Chapters: 2
- Verses: 18
- Philosophy: Vedanta

Atmabodha Upanishad (Sanskrit: आत्मबोध उपनिषत्) (Ātmabodha Upaniṣat) or Atmabodhopanishad (Sanskrit: आत्मबोधोपनिषत्) is one of the 108 Upanishadic Hindu scriptures, written in Sanskrit. It is one of the 10 Upanishads associated with the Rigveda. It is a general (Samanya) or Vedanta Upanishad.

The Atmabodha Upanishad begins with a hymn to the god Vishnu (Narayana), but then focuses on its core theme Atmabodha, meaning "State of knowledge of the inner self". The text further speaks on the "innermost Brahman" (Absolute Reality). While Brahman is identified with Vishnu in the opening prayer, later Brahman—who resides in the heart-lotus—is given an identity of its own and talks in the first person explaining its different aspects.

== Contents ==
The first verse equates the god Narayana (an epithet of Vishnu) with Brahman, Purusha, and Om, who frees a yogi from samsara, cycle of birth-death-rebirth. The mantra Om Namo Narayanaya (obeisance to Narayana) will attain Vaikuntha, the abode of Vishnu. Vishnu's attributes the conch, chakra and mace are mentioned and interpreted to denote Akasha (ether), Manas (Mind) and Buddhi (intelligence). Brahman resides on the heart-lotus. Narayana, the Brahmanya (Lord of the city of Brahman), has effulgence and glows with light. He is called Vishnu, son of Devaki (an epithet of the god Krishna, avatar of Vishnu), Madhusudana (the slayer of the demon Madhu), Pundarikaksha (whose eyes are like lotuses) and Achyuta (infallible one), all of which are epithets of Vishnu. Narayana is identified with Parabrahman (Great Brahman), which resides in all beings.

In the lotus-heart dwells Brahman. Prajna (the conscious) is its eye. Prajnana, Consciousness or wisdom, is its seat. Prajnana is Brahman. Through meditation of the Brahman one achieves the Ultimate Heaven (Svarga) where there is no death, and which is overflowing with amrita (ambrosia, signifying immortality) and glowing light. One thus becomes immortal.

Atman, Brahman

Let mind be blown about by desires.
How can pains affect me,
who am by nature full of bliss;
I have truly known my Atman,
My Ajnana (ignorance) has fled away.
(...)
Should the clouds screen the eyesight,
a fool thinks there is no sun;
So an embodied person full of Ajnana,
thinks there is no Brahman (Reality).

—Atmabodha Upanishad

The narration that follows is in the first person addressed by Brahman, who says that I am devoid of Maya (illusion) and the gunas (qualities). Brahman is described as unique, and sole controller of knowledge. It is without ego and makes no differentiation between the world, the jiva (living being) and Ishvara (God). Brahman is the Supreme Lord identified as Pratyagatma (Individual atman or soul). It is beyond ageing, destruction and change. It does not differentiate between people; knowledge is its prime characteristic. It is Atman, the Soul. It is origin of all the worlds, which are in its stomach. It is always in a state of awareness and is the real existence. Brahman is Consciousness and Bliss. It is limitless, of infinite wisdom without any bondage, without any errors, augers well, unbreakable, full of happiness, dear to all in the universe, always glowing without a beginning. It is the Truth, Vijnana (knowledge).

Brahman's position is not challenged by anyone. It is not enslaved and has experienced freedom. Like Truth in an illusionary world (where the rope may be perceived as a snake), Brahman is hidden. Like sugar is subsumed in sugarcane, Brahman dwells in all the worlds, in the form of Advaita (non-dual, non-separate from the Soul). Brahma resides in everything starting with the god Brahma to the smallest insect. As the sea experiences waves and bubbles without aspiring for it, in the same way it does not aspire for anything in this universe. Its status is that of a wealthy person not wanting to do anything with poverty. A knowledgeable person desires only amrita and not poison. Similarly, Brahman rejects everything that is not Atman. As the Sun which makes the pot shine does not vanish when the pot is destroyed, the soul is immortal, not destroyed when its bodily shell perishes.

Brahman is devoid of any attachments or bondage, scriptures or guru (teacher). It is above Maya and is not affected whether life exists or not or the mind is subject to attack. Prana (life-force) and Manas (Mind) are at Brahman's command. It does not experience distress and is always happy. Brahman declares that it is beyond the three bodies (gross, subtle, and causal) and their associated attributes like kula (family), gotra (clan) etc.

Like the owl finds darkness in the Sun, a person without any knowledge finds darkness in the shining Brahman, who is Bliss. A fool thinks there is no Sun, when it is covered by clouds. Likewise, one with Ajnana (ignorance, lack of jnana) questions the existence of Brahman. Like Amrita - which differs from poison, Brahman is without stains. Just as a small flare of light destroys darkness, wisdom - even in a small degree - ends ignorance. Brahman is without Ahamkara (egoism). It is Advaita (non-dual) and Satchitananda, Truth-Consciousness-Bliss.But just as it is difficult to walk along a path in the obfuscation of darkness, so is the case with treading the path of spirituality without the guiding light of a living master.

Chanting this Upanishad for a muhurta (period of 48 minutes) will assure no rebirth.

== Bibliography ==
- Aiyar, Narayanasvami (1914). "Thirty minor Upanishads". Archive Organization.
- Dalal, Roshen (October 2011). Hinduism: An Alphabetical Guide. Penguin Books India. ISBN 978-0-14-341421-6.
- Prasoon, Prof.S.K. (1 January 2008). Indian Scriptures. Pustak Mahal. ISBN 978-81-223-1007-8.
- Gurumaa, Anandmurti (2020). Sri Adi Shankaracharya Krit Atmabodha. Gurumaa Vani. ISBN 9381464650.
