= Subala Upanishad =

Vaishnava Upanishad text

Subala
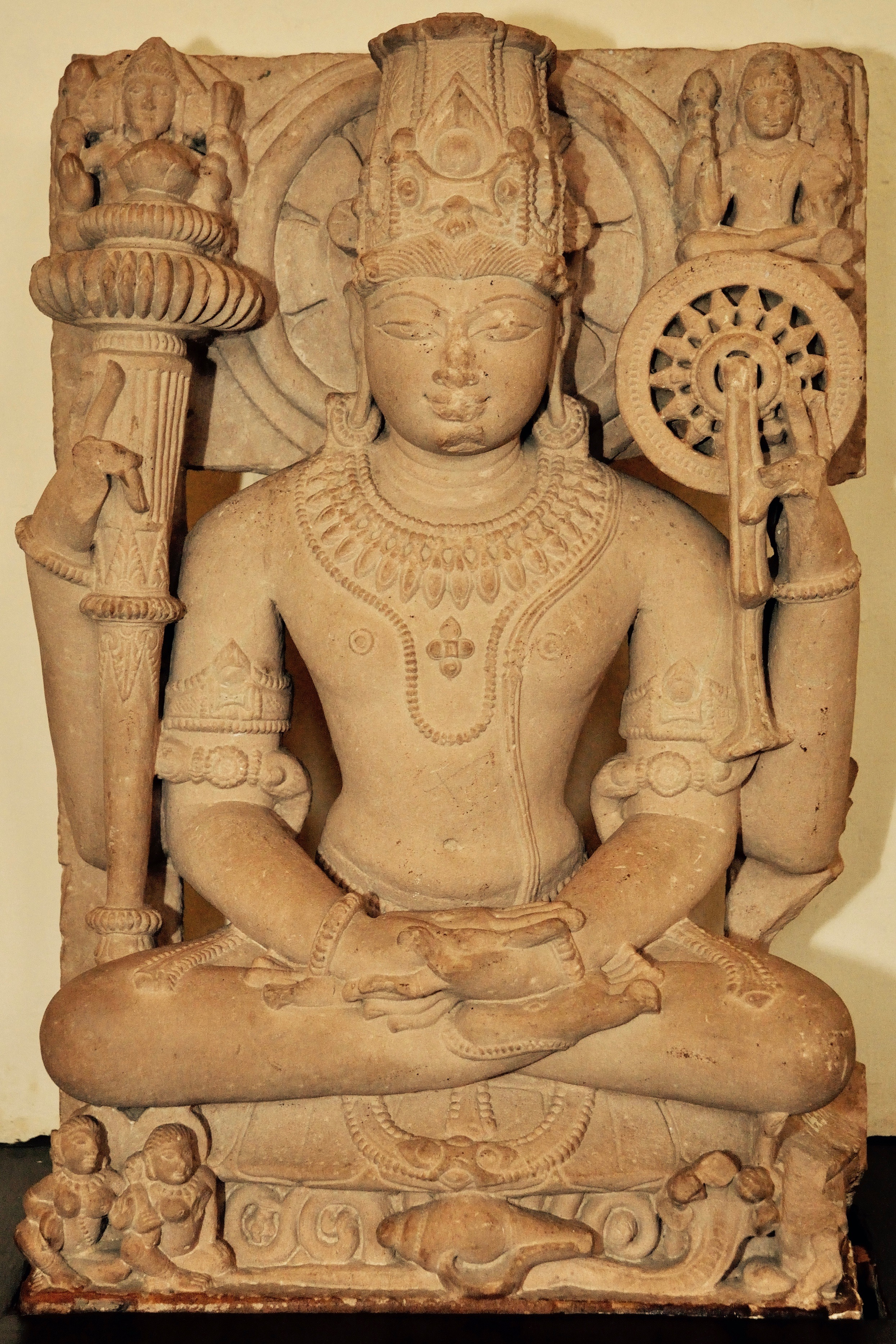
- The text extols Narayana (Vishnu)
- Devanagari: सुबाल
- IAST: Subāla
- Title means: name of a Vedic sage
- Date: Medieval
- Type: Samanya (general)
- Linked Veda: Shukla Yajurveda
- Chapters: 16
- Philosophy: Vaishnavism

The Subala Upanishad (सुबाल उपनिषत्, IAST: Subāla Upaniṣad), also called Subalopanishad (सुबालोपनिषत्), is an Upanishad written in Sanskrit. It is attached to the Shukla Yajurveda, and classified as one of the Samanya Upanishads of Hinduism.

The Subala Upanishad, together with the relatively older Mudgala Upanishad, are two Upanishads that discuss the Purusha Sukta of Rigveda, both notable for asserting that Narayana (Vishnu) is the Brahman (Highest Reality, Supreme Being). The Subala Upanishad text differs from Mudgala Upanishad in presenting more verses of the Purusha Sukta, being longer, and for declaring Narayana to be the father, the mother, the refuge, the friend and the goal of every living being.

The text is notable as the one frequently referred to by Ramanuja, the 11th-century proponent of Vishishtadvaita (qualified monism) school of Vedanta philosophy and a major influence on Vaishnavism in the 2nd millennium CE. Some modern scholars suggest that the Narayana theology of the Subala Upanishad may have been the decisive impetus to Ramanuja's Vishishtadvaita philosophy.

== History ==
The author or composition date of Subala Upanishad is unknown. Hans Hock states that it is a late Upanishadic text.

Manuscripts of this text are also found titled as Subalopanisad. In the Telugu language anthology of 108 Upanishads of the Muktika canon, narrated by Rama to Hanuman, it is listed at number 30.

== Contents ==
The Subala Upanishad is structured into sixteen chapters and deals a range of topics, including cosmology, physiology, psychology, and metaphysics.

=== Cosmology ===
The text opens as a conversation between Vedic sage Raikva (Subala) and Prajapati, the former is credited in the Chandogya Upanishad for Samvargavidya. Raikva asks about the origin of universe, with the question "What was at first?" The answer that follows in the text mirrors the Nasadiya Sukta hymn 10.129 of the Rigveda. In both texts, Prajapati replies that there was neither Sat (Be-ness), nor Asat (not-Be-ness), nor Sat-asat (co-mingling of both Sat and Asat). This Vedic cosmogony asserts that the universe started from nothing, a state where neither spirit nor matter nor a mingling of either existed. The Subala Upanishad asserts that in this nothingness existed the absolute Para-brahman, from which darkness emerged. This account resonates with the verses of the Purusha Sukta hymn 10.90 of the Rigveda.

The text states that from the darkness emerged ether (or space). In turn, air emerged from ether, fire emerged from air, water emerged from fire, and earth emerged from water. From earth emerged the egg, which split to create atmosphere and land. Between atmosphere and land emerged the divine person (Purusha) with one thousand heads, one thousand eyes, one thousand arms, and one thousand feet, who created death. The Brahman then created seven sons filled with truth, called Prajapatis. Out of the divine Purusha's mouth emerged the Brahmins, from the arms emerged the Kshatriyas, from the thighs emerged the Vaishyas and from the feet emerged the Shudras. From his mind emerged the moon, from the eyes came the sun, from his heart came the life-force (prana).

Chapter 2 asserts that from the apana of the divine Purusha came the Yakshas, Rakshasas, domestic animals, and Gandharvas. From his bones emerged the mountains, while the herbs and trees came from his hair. His forehead and anger became Rudra, while his exhalation became the Vedas, the Sutras, the grammar, the Nyaya logic, the prosody, the dharma, and all human knowledge and all beings. Atma (soul) emerged as divine light absorbing everything in the universe. He divided his own self (Atman of Purusha) into two, thus creating woman and man. The text asserts that along with the cycle of creation is competing cycle of destruction, wherein Vaishvanara destroys and returns everything back to darkness, where there is "neither Sat, nor Asat, nor Sat-asat."

Attaining Atma (Soul)

The undaunted man never grieves,
as he knows Atma to be great,
all-pervading and unborn. (...)
Some attain this Atma
by the six means: of Truth, Charity, Austerity,
of Non-injury to any creature,
of Brahmacharya,
of indifference to worldly objects;
And there are no other means.

—Subala Upanishad Chapter 3

=== Virtuous life as means to self-knowledge ===
Chapter 3 elaborates the path to moksha (liberation) through realization of the ultimate reality and being, the Atman and the Brahman. Atman and Brahman, asserts the text, is unborn, uncaused, devoid of form or nature that can be sensed; is imperishable, neither short nor long, neither definable nor obscure, neither provable nor shrouded, neither manifested nor measurable, neither with interior nor with exterior.

One attains this Atman and self-knowledge through virtues, which are six in number – truthfulness, charity, austerity, non-injury to others, Brahmacharya, and renunciation. The text then repeats the "da, da, da" axiology found in section 5.2 of the Brihadaranyaka Upanishad, referring to dama (self-restraint), dāna (charity) and daya (compassion).

=== States of consciousness ===
Chapter 4 states that the soul resides in the heart of a living being (dahara), in a ten petaled lotus. The heart feeds the 72,000 vessels in the body (nadis). The immortal soul, the innermost center of one's existence, is ever-present as the "resplendent effulgence", whether one is in an awake state of consciousness or dreaming in one's sleep. This section of the Subala Upanishad resonates with the doctrine presented in the much more ancient Chandogya Upanishad's section 8.1.

=== Organs in the human body are divine ===
Chapter 5 asserts, one by one, that 14 organs in the human body and ahamkara (personality) are divine. He who moves in these organs and binds them is the "fearless, sorrowless, infinite" Atman (soul, self).

For example, states the text, the eye is the deity Surya and the source of knowledge, and is thus linked to the soul. The tongue and mouth are Varuna, the hands are Indra, the feet are Vishnu, the mind is Moon, ahamkara (personality) is Rudra, and the sexual organs are Prajapati.

One must meditate on one's soul, states the text. This soul is the all-knowing ruler of all these organs and the source of happiness. The text asserts that soul is what is discussed by the Vedic texts and scriptures.

=== Narayana: the basis ===
Chapters 6 and 7 state that Narayana (Vishnu) is the one divine alone. The directional gods, all Devas, time and the aeons, the planetary systems, the climatic phenomena, the fourteen nadis, all organs of living beings, parents, siblings, fire, and ghee (clarified butter) are identified as manifestations of Narayana. Narayana is the radiant indwelling spirit in everyone and in every creature, asserts the text.

=== Dissolution ===
Chapter 8 through 12 state that everything except the Narayana (soul) is transitory and subject to dissolution. Everything merges back into the immortal, fearless, sorrowless, endless, seedless Brahman. Chapter 10 asserts that Atman is Brahman, and everything rests in one's own soul.

Be child-like

बाल्येन तिष्ठासेद्बालस्वभावोऽसङ्गो निरवद्यो
मौनेन पाण्डित्येन निरवधिकारतयोपलभ्येत

Child-like simplicity ought to be
one's outlook on life.
Unattached, innocent, blameless,
silent, with aloneness.

—Subala Upanishad Chapter 13

=== The life of the sage ===
Chapter 13 asserts that the child is a state of innocence and non-attachment, and this is what one must cultivate. The child knows of no classes or stages of life and learns innocently. So also, states the text, is the state of moksha (liberation) for a sage, who knows no fear, worries, cravings, anger, or falsehood.

=== Gradual dissolution in the supreme ===
Chapters 14 to 16 assert that with self-knowledge, a person dissolves into the supreme, the Narayana. In this state, there is "neither Sat, nor Asat, nor Sat-asat."

== Impact ==
The Subala Upanishad was frequently cited by the 11th-century scholar Ramanuja, the main proponent of Vishishtadvaita (qualified monism) school of Vedanta philosophy. His bhasya (commentary) on Brahma Sutras, for example, references the Subala Upanishad, as he interprets the Sutras. Ramanuja justifies Vishnu as each individual self (Atman, soul), the inner self of everyone, everything in the world, the means to ultimate liberation, with theological arguments partly based on the Subala Upanishad.

Bartley states that the Narayana theology of the Subala Upanishad was an important influence on Ramanuja, while Oberhammer and Rastelli describe Subala Upanishad as possibly the decisive impetus to Ramanuja's Vishishtadvaita philosophy.

According to John Plott, the Subala Upanishad influenced the Bhakti movement in medieval India.

== See also ==
- Atma Upanishad
- Advaita Vedanta
- Dvaita Vedanta
- Nirvana Upanishad
