= Adhyatma Upanishad =

Upanishadic Hindu scripture

Adhyatma
- Devanagari: अध्यात्म
- IAST: Adhyātma
- Title means: spiritual
- Type: Samanya
- Linked Veda: Shukla Yajurveda
- Chapters: 1
- Verses: 71

Adhyatma Upanishad (Adhyātma) or Adhyatmopanishad is one of the 108 Upanishadic Hindu scriptures, written in Sanskrit. It is one of the 19 Upanishads under the Shukla Yajurveda or White Yajurveda. It is classified as a Samanya (non-sectarian) Upanishad. It is also known as Ṭurīyāṭīṭa Avaḍhūṭa Upanishaḍ. The Upanishad expounds on the nature of Brahman.

== Contents ==
In the invocation, Brahman is praised as limitless and all-pervading in this universe. Prayer is offered for ushering peace in this world.

The Adhyatma Upanishad describes the eternal form of Brahman, the unborn (Aja) one who remains within the recess of the heart. His body is represented as the earth (Prithvi), water (Apa), fire (Agni), air (Vayu), ether (Akasha), mind (Manas), intellect (Buddhi), sense of self (ahamkara), Subconscious mind or memory (chitta), unmanifestated (Avyakta), indestructible (akshara), and Death (mrityu), all of these elements act within themselves, and within the body without one's awareness. Brahman is then equated with the god Narayana (Vishnu) who resides in the soul and cleans everything and washes away all misdeeds.

The Upanishad states that one who shuns the ego of “I and Mine” by meditating on Brahman, will be aware of his state of Pratyagatma (Brahman in an individual), of intellect. He should fix his thoughts on Soham ("I am That"). His aim should be of selflessness without pursuing worldly things with total obliviousness to sleeping, gossip, and sounds. He should surrender his Atman (soul) to Paramatman, the Supreme Soul. In order to realize Atman, he should not pay any attention to his impure body, a parental burden, which is to be shunned like an out caste. As a confined space becomes one with the infinite space, one should absorb his atma (self) with the Supreme Soul.

The Macrocosm and microcosm, which are the storehouses of all impure things, are to be rejected to become the "self-luminous Substratum". Shunning egoism amounts to a blissful and bright state, similar to the moon shining bright after an eclipse. Getting rid of impulsive thoughts will usher a feeling of freedom. An intelligent person avoiding truth gets into an illusory state, in the same way as a reed pulled out does not remain straight.

The Adhyatma Upanishad also dwells on the concept of samadhi. The consecutive sequence of benefits of Vairagya (detachment or renunciation) in life leads to bodha (spiritual knowledge) to uparati (restraint of mind); to Shanti, inner calmness achieved through perfect happiness of the mind. Nivṛṭṭi, the inward contemplation will achieve a unique sense of perfect happiness and spirituality. Illusion's upadhi encompasses the universe.

This self (soul) is the ultimate in the entire universe and it is constituted of the deities Brahma, Vishnu, Indra and Shiva. Extra sensory perception is embedded in the chitta (mind) and hence one's focus should be on the mind. While the thought process leads to reasoning so is the meaning of a sentence understood by listening.

Reincarnation on account of millions of karmas (past actions, works and deeds) vanishes with devoted attention which eventually results in moral principles taking roots. This situation is explained by the Yogis as “the cloud of virtues”. As universal space is always in a detached, so is the sage who is aware of his Reality also remains detached from futures events.

The sequence of communication of the teachings of the Adhyatma Upanishad, was from the Sage Apantaratama (sometimes regarded as the previous birth of Vyasa) to the god Brahma, Sage Angiras, Sage Raikva and the god Rama, who propagated it to all.

== Commentaries ==
Indian spiritual guru Osho authored a commentary named Finger Pointing to the Moon on the Adhyatma Upanishad, which was first published by its original Sanskrit name in Hindi in 1976.

== Bibliography ==
- Prasoon, Prof.S.K. (1 January 2008). Indian Scriptures. Pustak Mahal. ISBN 978-81-223-1007-8.
