= Atma Upanishad =

Atma
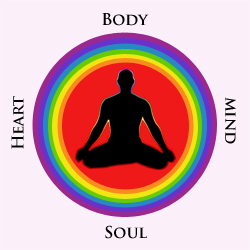
- The text describes body, mind and soul
- Devanagari: आत्मा
- IAST: Ātma
- Title means: Atman (self, soul)
- Author(s): Angiras
- Type: Samanya
- Linked Veda: Atharvaveda
- Chapters: 3
- Verses: 31
- Philosophy: Vedanta

The Atma Upanishad (Sanskrit: आत्मा उपनिषत्), is one of the minor Upanishadic texts of Hinduism, written in Sanskrit language. It is one of the 31 Upanishads, associated with the Atharvaveda. It is classified as a Samanya (general) and Vedantic Upanishad.

The Upanishad describes three types of Self (atman): the Bahya-atma or external self (body), the Antar-atma or inner self (individual soul) and the Param-atma or highest self (the Brahman, Purusha). The text asserts that one must meditate, during Yoga, on the highest self as one's self that is partless, spotless, changeless, desireless, indescribable, all-penetrating.

The text has also been referred to as Atmopanishad. In the Telugu language anthology of 108 Upanishads of the Muktika canon, narrated by Rama to Hanuman, it is listed at number 76.

== Structure ==
The Upanishad is a short text, structured as a mix of prose and verse poetry. It is presented as a sermon by the Vedic sage Angiras on body, mind, soul and Paramatma.

== Contents ==
The text opens with Sage Angiras stating Purusha manifests itself as three types of atman (Self): Ajayat-Atma or Bahya-atma or external atman (born self, body), Antar-Atma or the internal atman (individual soul), and the Param-atma or the highest atman (Brahman, the universal soul).

The external or outer self, states the text is composed of the anatomical organs and parts to see, perceive, act, react and procreate. The outer Self is the physical body, it is born and it perishes.

The internal self is what perceives the five elements: Prithvi (Earth), Ap (water), Vayu (air), Agni (fire) and Akasha (ether). This inner self, asserts the text, is discerned as consciousness, through activities such as perceiving the empirical world, speaking, dancing, singing, yawning; manifestations such as memory; it is the victim of ambition, likes and dislikes, anger, fear, greed, pleasure and pain, doubts and delusion. The inner self discriminates and distinguishes between philosophies such as Nyaya, Mimamsa, Puranas and various Dharmashastras. These abilities, the mind (Manas) and consciousness (Cit) constitute the inner self, defines the Atma Upanishad.

The highest Self is the one who is venerated by syllables of the Om, and adored in the Vedas. One mediates over this highest Self by practising yoga: breath-control, withdrawing in the mind and other yogic exercises. Like the seed of the ficus tree or millet cannot be comprehended by even by breaking into 100,000 parts, similarly Paramatman cannot be comprehended by breaking it into parts, as it is partless, it has no property and no quality (Guna), it is pure and is not the effect of works. It is the infinite Brahman, the Purusha that is neither born nor dies nor decays, states the text. It cannot be divided, burnt or destroyed. It has no limbs, no stains, no conflicts, no expectations and is untouched by the feelings of the sensory organs or ego. It is detached from outer self and inner self, it is all pervading, pure, changeless.

== Commentary ==
The German Indologist Paul Deussen states the Atma Upanishad converts the "beautiful poetic" section on the Atman in the Chandogya Upanishad, into "most dry" scholastic description. The Upanishad explains and references hymn fragments from ancient texts, including classical Upanishads. The description of Paramatman in this text is derived from the Chandogya Upanishad, the Shvetashvatara Upanishad, the Prashna Upanishad, the Bhagavad Gita, the Katha Upanishad, the Dhyanabindu Upanishad, the Yogashikha Upanishad and the Maitrayaniya Upanishad.

== Bibliography ==
- Dalal, Roshen (October 2011). Hinduism: An Alphabetical Guide. Penguin Books India. ISBN 978-0-14-341421-6.
- Deussen, Paul (1 January 1997). Sixty Upanishads of the Veda. Motilal Banarsidass. ISBN 978-81-208-1467-7.
- Gajendragadkar, K. V. (1959). Neo-upanishadic Philosophy. Bharatiya Vidya Bhavan.
- Hattangadi, Sunder (2003). "आत्मोपनिषत् (Atma Upanishad)" (PDF) (in Sanskrit).
- Prasoon, Prof.S.K. (1 January 2008). Indian Scriptures. Pustak Mahal. ISBN 978-81-223-1007-8.
- Weber, Albrecht (1677). History of Indian Literature. Trübner.
