= Kaushitaki Upanishad =

One of the ancient Sanskrit scriptures of Hinduism

The Kaushitaki Upanishad (Sanskrit: कौषीतकि उपनिषद्, Kauṣītaki Upaniṣad) is an ancient Sanskrit text contained inside the Rigveda. It is associated with the Kaushitaki shakha, but a Sāmānya Upanishad, meaning that it is "common" to all schools of Vedanta. It was included in Robert Hume's list of 13 Principal Upanishads, and lists as number 25 in the Muktikā canon of 108 Upanishads.

The Kaushitaki Upanishad, also known as Kaushitaki Brahmana Upanishad, is part of the Kaushitaki Aranyaka or the Shankhayana Aranyaka. The Kausitaki Aranyaka comprises 15 chapters and four of these chapters form the Kaushitaki Upanishad.

== Chronology ==
The chronology of the Kaushitaki Upanishad, like other Upanishads, is unclear. It is based on an analysis of archaism, style and repetitions across texts, driven by assumptions about likely evolution of ideas, and on presumptions about which philosophy might have influenced which other Indian philosophies.

The Kaushitaki Upanishad was probably composed before the middle of the 1st millennium BCE. R. D. Ranade places Kaushitaki chronological composition in the third group of ancient Upanishads, composed about the time of the Aitareya and Taittiriya Upanishads. Juan Mascaró posits that the Kaushitaki Upanishad was probably composed after the Brihadaranyaka, Chandogya, and Taittiriya Upanishads, but before all other ancient Principal Upanishads of Hinduism. Paul Deussen as well as M. Winternitz consider the Kaushitaki Upanishad as amongst the most ancient prose style Upanishads, and pre-Buddhist, pre-Jaina literature.

Ian Whicher dates the Kaushitaki Upanishad to about 800 BCE. According to a 1998 review by Patrick Olivelle and other scholars, the Kaushitaki Upanishad was likely composed in a pre-Buddhist period, but after the more ancient Brihadaranyaka and Chandogya Upanishads, placing the Kaushitaki text between 6th to 5th century BCE.

== Structure ==
The Kaushitaki Upanishad is part of the Rigveda, but it occupies different chapter numbers in the Veda manuscripts discovered in different parts of India. Three sequences are most common: the Upanishad is chapters 1, 2, 3 and 4 of Kausitaki Aranyaka, or 6, 7, 8, 9 chapters of that Aranyaka, or chapters 1, 7, 8 and 9 in some manuscripts. Paul Deussen suggests that these different chapter numbers may reflect that Upanishadic layer of Vedic literature were created and incorporated as spiritual knowledge in the pre-existing Aranyaka-layer of Vedic texts, and when this was being done in distant parts of India, the sequencing information was not implemented uniformly.

The Kausitaki Upanishad is a prose text, divided into four chapters, containing 6, 15, 9 and 20 verses respectively.

There is some evidence that the Kaushitaki Upanishad, in some manuscripts, had nine chapters, but these manuscripts are either lost or yet to be found.

== Content ==
=== First chapter ===
In the first chapter of the Kausitaki Upanishad, rebirth and transmigration of Atman (Self) is asserted as existent, and that one's life is affected by karma, and then it asks whether there is liberation and freedom from the cycles of birth and rebirth. Verse 2 of the first chapter states it as follows (abridged),

Born am I and again reborn,
As twelvefold year, as thirteenth beyond the moon,
From the twelvefold, from the thirteenfold father,
The this one and the other versus this to know,
Until ye, seasons, me led to death by virtue of this truth, by virtue of this Tapas,
I am the seasons, I am the child of the seasons !
Who are you? I am you.

— Kaushitaki Upanishad, Chapter 1, Hymn 2

In verse 6 of chapter 1, the Kausitaki Upanishad asserts that a man is the season (nature), sprouts from season, rises from a cradle, reborn through his wife, as splendour. It then states, in a dialogue between Man and Brahman (Universal Self, Eternal Reality),

He declares, "Man is the Self is every living being. You are the self of every being. What you are, I am."
Man asks, "Who am I then?"
Brahman answers, "The Truth."

— Kaushitaki Upanishad, Chapter 1, Hymn 6, Translated by Paul Deussen)

Edward Cowell translates the above verses that declare the "Oneness in Atman and Brahman" principle as follows,

(The Self answers, when asked by Brahma, "Who art thou?")
I am time, I am what is in time;
I am born from the womb of space;
from the self manifesting light of Brahman;
the seed of the year;
the splendour of the past and the cause, the Self of all that is sensible and insensible, and of the five elements;
Thou art Self. What thou art, that am I.
Brahma says to him, "Who am I?"
His answer, "Thou art the Truth".

— Kaushitaki Upanishad, Chapter 1, Translated by Edward Cowell

=== Second chapter ===
In the second chapter of the Kausitaki Upanishad, each life and all lives is declared as Brahman (Universal Self, Eternal Being). To the extent a person realizes that his being is identical with Brahman, to that extent he is Brahman. He doesn't need to pray, states Kausitaki Upanishad, the one who realizes and understands his true nature as identical with the universe, the Brahman. To those who don't understand their Atman, they blindly serve their senses and cravings, they worship the without; and in contrast, those who do understand their Atman, their senses serve their Atman, they live holistically.

In verse 5 of the second chapter, the Kausitaki Upanishad asserts that "external rituals such as Agnihotram offered in the morning and in the evening, must be replaced with inner Agnihotram, the ritual of introspection". Paul Deussen states that this chapter reformulates religion, by declaring, "religion is supposed not to consist in the observance of the external cult; but that which places the whole life, with every breathe, in its service." It is knowledge that makes one the most beautiful, the most glorious, and the strongest. Not rituals, but knowledge should be one's pursuit.

=== Third chapter ===
After asserting Atman (Self) as personified God in first two chapters, the Kausitaki Upanishad develops the philosophical doctrine of the Atman in the third chapter. It identifies perception of sense-objects as dependent on sense-organs, which in turn depend on integrative psychological powers of the mind. Then it posits that freedom and liberation comes not from sense-objects, not from sense-organs, not from subjective psychological powers of mind, but that it comes from "knowledge and action" alone. The one who knows Self, and acts harmoniously with the Self, solemnly exists as the highest God which is that Self (Atman) itself. The chapter invokes deity Indra, personifies him as Atman and reveals him as communicating that he is Life-breath and Atman, and Atman is him and all is One.

The chapter presents the metaphysical definition of a human being as Consciousness, Atman, Self. In verse 3, it develops the foundation for this definition by explaining that speech cannot define a human being, because we see human beings midst us who are born without the power of speech (dumb); that sight cannot define a human being, because we see human beings midst us who are born without the ability of sight (blind); that hearing cannot define a human being, because we see human beings midst us who are born without the ability to hear (deaf); that mind cannot define a human being, because we see human beings midst us who are without the power of clear thinking (foolishness); that arms or legs cannot define a human being, because we see human beings midst us who lose their arms or legs (cut in an accident). A being has life-force, which is consciousness. And that which is conscious, has life-force.

In many verses of chapter 3, the theme, the proof and the premise is re-asserted by Kaushitaki Upanishad, that "Prāṇa is prajñā, Prajñā is prāṇa" (वै प्राणः सा प्रज्ञा या वा प्रज्ञा स प्राणः, Life-force is consciousness, consciousness is life-force).

In the last verses of chapter 3, the Kaushitaki Upanishad asserts that to really know someone, one must know his Self. Know the Self of the subject, not just superficial objects. The structure of its argument is as follows (abridged),

One should not desire to understand the speech but should desire to know him who speaks,
One should not desire to understand the smell (described by a person) but should desire to know him who smells,
One should not desire to understand the form (of the person) but should desire to know him who sees the form,
One should not desire to understand the sound (described) but should desire to know him who hears,
One should not desire to understand the food (description) but should desire to know him who tastes,
One should not desire to understand the deed but should desire to know him who performs the deed,
One should not desire to understand pleasure and pain from excitation but should desire to know him who feels the pleasure and pain,
One should not desire to understand the opinion and thinking but should desire to know him who opines and thinks.
Because if there were no elements of consciousness, there would be no elements of material being
Because if there were no elements of material being, there would be no elements of consciousness
Because any one phenomenon does not come about through the one without the other,
Because Prāṇa (life-force) is also the Prajñātman (knowledge-self), is bliss, is not ageing, is immortal
This is my Ātman (Self) which one should know, O! this is my Ātman which one should know.

— Kausitaki Upanishad, Chapter 3

Edward Cowell translates these last verses as, "Prāṇa is prajñā, it is joy, it is eternally young, it is immortal. This is the guardian of the world, this is the king of the world, this is the lord of the world, this is my Self. Thus let a man know, thus let a man know." Robert Hume summarizes the last verse of Kaushitaki's Chapter 3 as stating that "a human being's ethical responsibility, his very self being is identical with the world-all".

=== Fourth chapter ===
The fourth chapter of Kausitaki Upanishad builds on the third chapter, but it peculiarly varies in various manuscripts of Rigveda discovered in Indian subcontinent. This suggests that this chapter may be an addition of a later era. Despite the variations, the central idea is similar in all recensions so far. The chapter offers sixteen themes in explaining what Brahman (Atman) is, which overlaps with the twelve found in Chapter 2 of Brihadaranyaka Upanishad. This last chapter of Kausitaki Upanishad states that Brahman and Self are one, there is ultimate unity in the Self, which is the creative, pervasive, supreme and universal in each living being.

== Translations ==
The Kaushitaki Upanishad has been translated by many scholars, but the translations vary because the manuscripts used vary. It was translated into Persian in medieval times, as Kokhenk; however, the manuscript used for that translation has been lost. The most cited English translations are those by Eduard Cowell, Paul Deussen, Robert Hume and Max Müller.
