= Fifth Veda =

Text which lies outside the four canonical Vedas

The notion of a fifth Veda (Sanskrit: pañcama veda), that is, of a text which lies outside the four canonical Vedas, but nonetheless has the status of a Veda, is one that has been advanced in a number of post-Vedic Hindu texts, in order to accord a particular text or texts and their doctrines with the timelessness and authority that Hinduism associates with the Vedas. The idea is an ancient one, appearing for the first time in the Upanishads, but has over the centuries since then also been applied to more recent Sanskrit and vernacular texts.

== Sanskrit texts: the "Panchama Veda" ==
The earliest reference to a fifth Veda is found in the Chandogya Upanishad (7.1.2), which applies the term to the "histories" (Itihasa-Purana, "ancient traditions") of its day,

itihāsapurāṇaṃ pañcamaṃ vedānāṃ

This reference to itihasa-purana is used by the Mahabharata, which belongs to the class of epic literature called "itihasa", to refer to itself as the fifth Veda. Relying also on its attribution to Vyasa, the legendary compiler of the Vedas, the Mahabharata declares itself a new Veda for a new era, intended for all people, and which is the equal of, and in some ways superior to, the four canonical Vedas. The other major Hindu epic, the Ramayana, also makes a claim to be the fifth Veda. But, since the Mahabharata itself contains an abbreviated version of Ramayana, so the Mahabharata itself is considered as the fifth Veda.

Similar claims are made in the Puranas, which claim to be the fifth Veda together with the itihasas, frequently referring to themselves as the "Itihasa-Purana-Veda". The Bhagavata Purana elaborates on the Chandogya Upanishad's statement concerning the fifth, by stating that after the four Vedas emerged from each of Brahma's four mouths, the fifth Veda - itihasapurana - emerged from his fifth mouth or all his mouths. It then declares itself supreme over all other puranas, on the grounds that it was Vyasa's crowning achievement. Similarly, the Skandapurana, too, suggests that the puranas are the Fifth Veda, thus giving itself scriptural authority.

The नाट्यशास्त्र Natya Shastra, a text dealing with performative theory, also applies to itself the label of "Fifth Veda" (1.4) although strictly speaking, it is a branch of the Gandharvaveda, an upaveda of the Samaveda (Monier-Williams). The Natyashastra says that it was formulated by Brahma, incorporating elements of the other four Vedas, the idea being that the dramatic or musical performance of sacred stories, which, through the events they related, symbolised divine processes, could draw individuals to holier thoughts. Other works that have been characterised as the "Fifth Veda" include, texts on ayurveda (Veda concerning the maintenance of "life"), a system of traditional South Asian medicine.

== Non-Sanskrit texts ==
Several non-Sanskrit texts have also had the status of Veda assigned to them. An example is the Ramcharitmanas, a 17th-century retelling of the story of the Ramayana in Awadhi, which is often called the "Fifth Veda" and is viewed by devotees as equalling or superseding the four canonical Vedas in authority and sanctity as the text for the Kali Yuga.

Several Tamil texts have been assigned the status of being a new Veda by the adherents, who usually term the text in question the "Tamil Veda" or "Dravida Veda". The Kural is traditionally praised with several epithets and alternative titles, including "the Tamil Veda" and "the Divine Book." The Tamil Vaishnavite bhakti community of the Alvars conferred this status on the Tiruvaymoli (and, later, the Divya Prabandham in general), a claim which was also accepted in secular works such as the Lilatilakam, a 14th-century grammar of Kerala Manipravalam. As with the Natyashastra, authors seeking to confer the status of a Veda on the Tiruvaymoli argued that unlike the canonical Vedic texts reserved for the Brahmins, this new Tamil Veda was accessible to all classes. Similarly, the Tamil Shaivite community conferred upon the hymns of the Tevaram the status of a Tamil Veda, a claim which several of the poets themselves made. Tamil Shaivites saw the designation "Tamil Veda" as making the Tevaram an alternative to the Sanskrit Veda, whereas Vaishnavites saw their equivalently designated texts as being a parallel track, rather than an alternative.

== See also ==
- Upaveda
- Jataveda
