= Agni =

Hindu fire god

- God of Fire
- Member of Pancha Bhuta
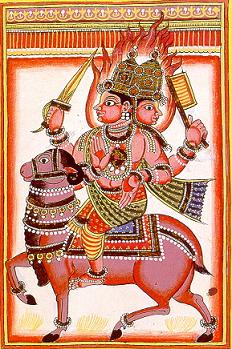
- Agni upon his mount, a sheep, with flames leaping upwards from his crown
- Other names: Mātariśvan
- Affiliation: Deva, Dikpāla
- Abode: Agniloka
- Mantra: Om Agni Devaya Vidhmahe Jathavedaya Dhimahi Tanno Agni Prachodyata
- Weapon: Āgneyāstra
- Mount: Sheep

Genealogy
- Parents: Brahma (father)
- Consort: Svāhā
- Children: Pāvaka, Pāvamāna, Śuchi, Nīla, Agneya

Agni (Sanskrit: अग्नि [ˈɐgni], meaning 'Fire') is the Hindu god of fire. As the guardian deity of the southeast direction, he is typically found in southeast corners of Hindu temples. In the classical cosmology of Hinduism, fire (Agni) is one of the five inert impermanent elements (Pañcabhūtá) along with sky (Ākāśa), water (Apas), air (Vāyu) and earth (Pṛthvī), the five combining to form the empirically perceived material existence (Prakṛti).

In the Vedas, Agni is a major and one of the most invoked gods along with Indra and Soma. Agni is considered the mouth of the gods and goddesses and the medium that conveys offerings to them in a homa (votive ritual). He is conceptualized in ancient Hindu texts to exist at three levels, on earth as fire, in the atmosphere as lightning, and in the sky as the sun. This triple presence accords him as the messenger between the deities and humans in the Vedic scriptures. The relative importance of Agni declined in the post-Vedic era, as he was internalised and his identity evolved to metaphorically represent all transformative energy and knowledge in the Upanishads and later Hindu literature. Agni remains an integral part of Hindu traditions, such as being the central witness of the rite-of-passage ritual in traditional Hindu weddings called Saptapadi (seven steps and mutual vows), in the Upanayana ceremony of rite of passage, as well being part of the diyā (lamp) in festivals such as Deepavali and Arti in Puja.

Agni (Pali: Aggi) is a term that appears extensively in Buddhist texts and in the literature related to the Senika heresy debate within the Buddhist traditions. In the ancient Jainism thought, Agni (fire) contains soul and fire-bodied beings, additionally appears as Agni-kumaras or "fire children" in its theory of rebirth and a class of reincarnated beings and is discussed in its texts with the equivalent term Tejas.

== Etymology, meaning and other names ==
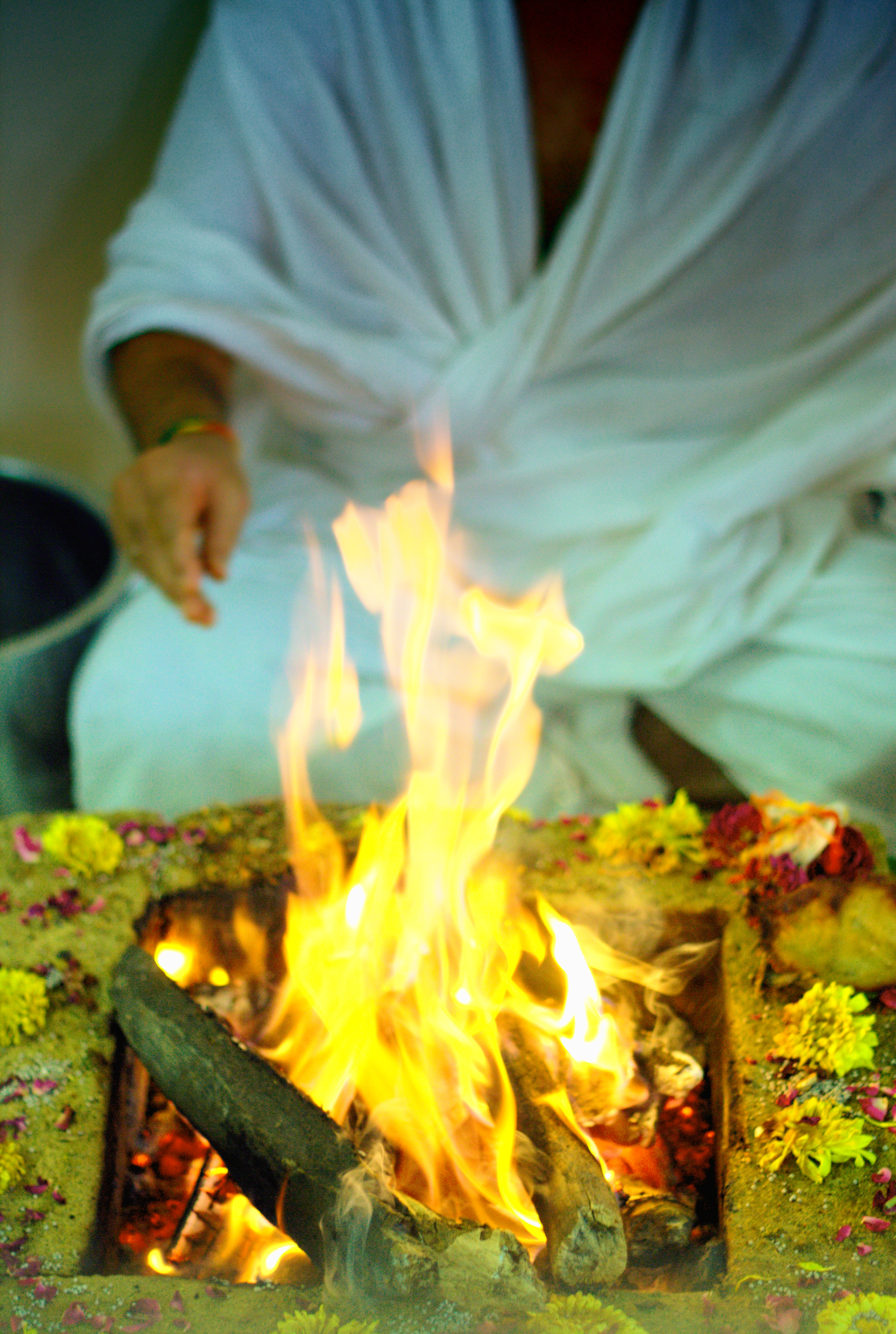
Agni (fire) is a part of major rites-of-passage rituals such as weddings and cremation in Indian religions.

Sanskrit अग्नि (Agni) continues one of two core terms for fire reconstructed to Proto-Indo-European, *h₁n̥gʷnis, other reflexes of which include Albanian: *Enj-i ([ɛɲi]), the reconstructed name of the fire god in the Albanian pagan mythology, which continues to be used in the Albanian language to refer to Thursday (e enjte), Latin ignis (the root of English ignite), Lithuanian ugnis, Kurdish agir, Old Slavonian огнь (ognĭ) and its descendants: Russian огонь (ogon´), Serbian oganj, Polish ogień, etc., all meaning "fire".

The ancient Indian grammarians variously derived it:

- from root aj, which in Sanskrit means "to drive" in the sense of "nimble, agile";
- from agri, the root of which means "first", referring to "that first in the universe to arise" or "fire" according to Shatapatha Brahmana section 6.1.1; the Brahmana claims this is cryptically called as Agni because everyone including the gods and goddesses are known to love short nicknames;
- according to the 5th-century BCE Sanskrit text Nirukta-Nighantu in section 7.14, sage Śakapūṇi states the word Agni is derived from three verbs – from 'going', from 'shining or burning', and from 'leading'; the letter "a" (अ) is from root "i" which he claims implies 'to go', the letter "g" (ग्) is from the root "añj" meaning 'to shine' or "dah" meaning 'to burn', and the last letter is by itself the root "nī" (नी) which means 'to lead'.

In the early Vedic literature, Agni primarily connotes the fire as a god, one reflecting the primordial powers to consume, transform and convey. Yet the term is also used with the meaning of a Mahabhuta (constitutive substance), one of five that the earliest Vedic thinkers believed to constitute material existence, and that later Vedic thinkers such as Kanada and Kapila expanded widely, namely Dyaus (aether), Vayu (air), Varuna (water), Bhumi (earth) and Agni (fire).

The word Agni is used in many contexts, ranging from fire in the stomach, the cooking fire in a home, the sacrificial fire in an altar, the fire of cremation, the fire of rebirth, the fire in the energetic saps concealed within plants, the atmospheric fire in lightning and the celestial fire in the sun. In the Brahmanas layer of the Vedas, such as in section 5.2.3 of Shatapatha Brahmana, Agni represents all the gods and goddesses, all concepts of spiritual energy that permeates everything in the universe. In the Upanishads and post-Vedic literature, Agni additionally became a metaphor for immortal principle in humans, and any energy or knowledge that consumes and dispels a state of darkness, transforms and procreates an enlightened state of existence.

Agni is also famously known as:

- Pāvaka – one who is the sanctifier of everything;
- Havyavāhana – one who carries the sacrificial butter;
- Saptajihvi – one who with seven tongues (flames); and consumes the sacrificial butter very fast;
- Vahni – one who is travelling with wind;
- Anala – one who is one of the Vasus;
- Hutāśana – one who is the consumer of the sacrificed offerings;
- Chitrabhānu – one who is the colourful light producing one;
- Jvalana – one who is always glowing;
- Vaiśvānara – one who is the man of the world;
- Vibhāvasu – one whose light is all's wealth;
- Dhumaketu – one who is crowned with fire.

Other names include Śikhī, Pingesa, Plavanga, Bhūritejaḥ, Rudragarva, Hiraṇyakṛta.

== Origins ==
Agnipani (100 BCE)

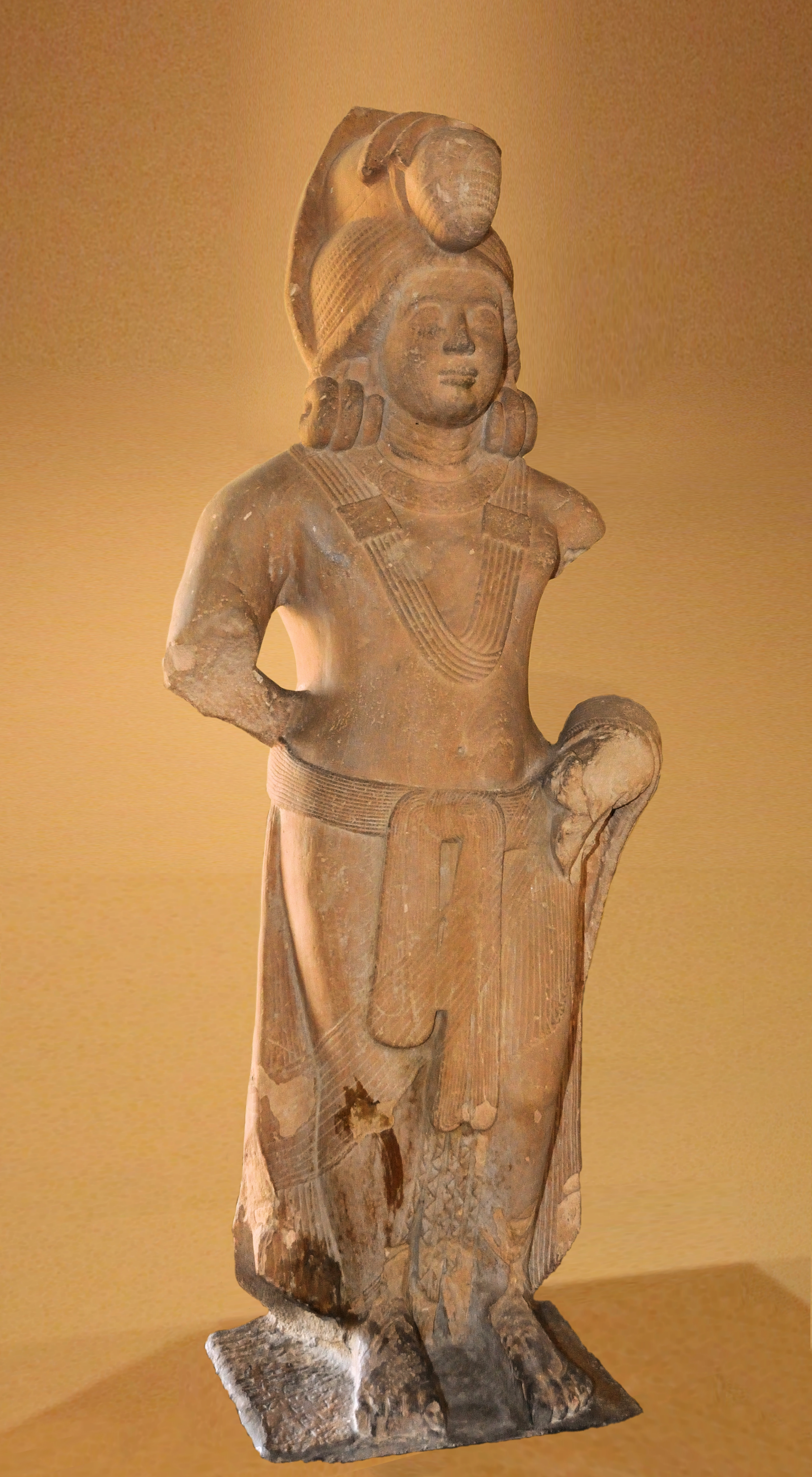
Front

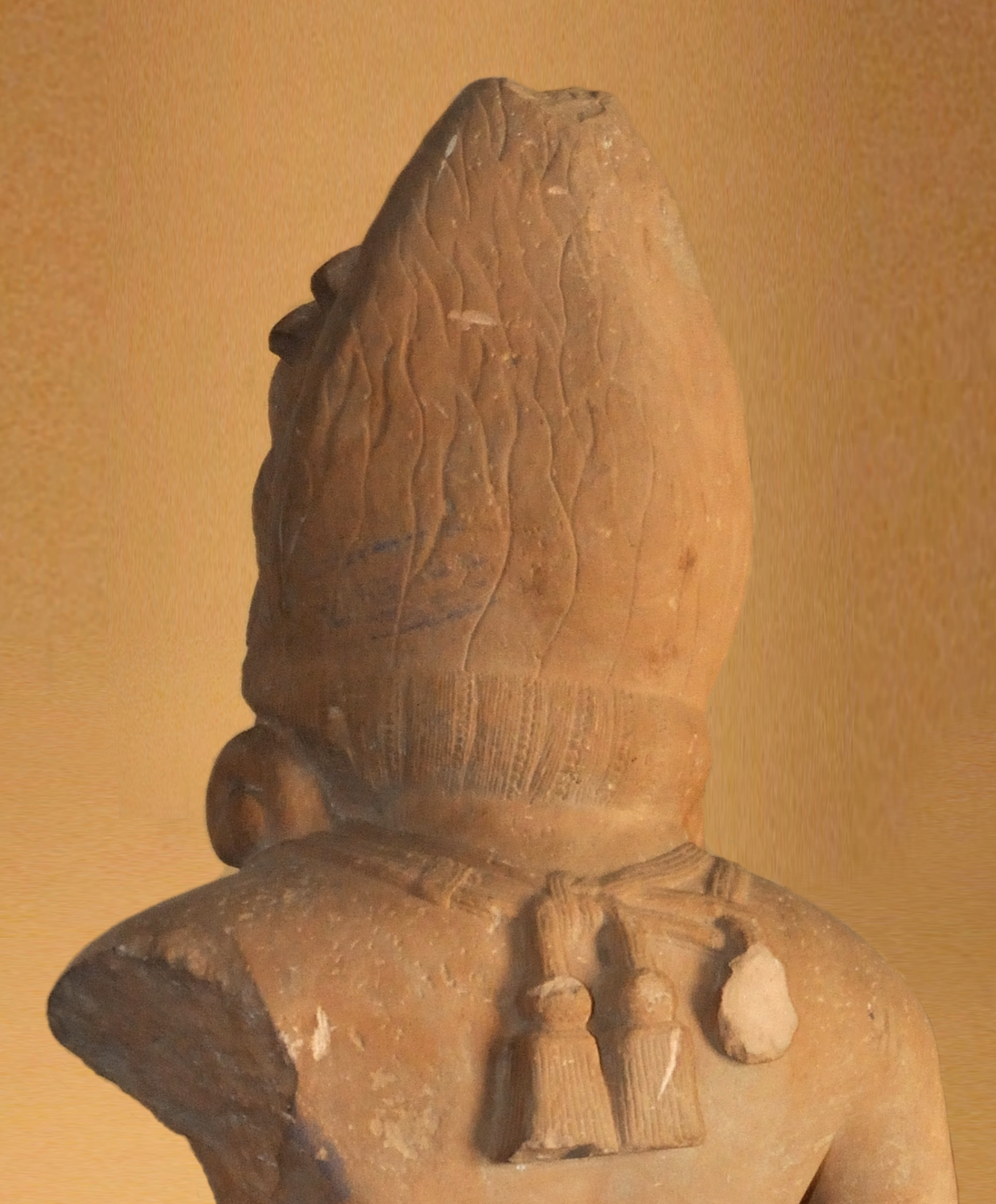
Back of head with flame tongues

"Agnipani" ("Fire-holder"), 100 BCE. Behind its turban, the statue has a flame-shaped aureole incised with flame tongues. Art of Mathura, Mathura Museum, GMM 87.146.

There are many theories about the origins of the god Agni, some tracing it to Indo-European mythology, others tracing to Hindu mythology.

The origin myth found in many Indo-European cultures is one of a falcon that carries or brings fire from the deities to people. This messenger also brings an elixir of immortality from heaven to earth. In either case, the falcon returns every day with sacrificial offerings for the deities, but sometimes the falcon hides and disappears to heaven. Agni is molded in similar mythical themes, in some hymns with the phrase the "heavenly falcon that flies".

The earliest layers of the Vedic texts of Hinduism, such as section 6.1 of Kaṭhaka Saṃhitā and section 1.8.1 of Maitrāyaṇī Saṃhitā state that the universe began with nothing, neither night nor day existed, what existed was just the god Prajāpati. Agni originated from the forehead of Prajāpati, assert these texts. With the creation of Agni came light, and with that were created day and night. Agni, state these Saṃhitās, is the same as the Brahman, the truth, the eyes of the manifested universe. These mythologies develop into more complex stories about Agni's origins in the later layers of Vedic texts, such as in section 2.1.2 of the Taittiriya Brahmana and sections 2.2.3–4 of Shatapatha Brahmana.

Agni is originally conceptualized as the ultimate source of the "creator-preserver-destroyer" triad, then one of the trinities, as the one who ruled the earth. His twin brother Indra ruled the atmosphere as the god of storm, rain and war, while his other brother Sūrya ruled the sky and heavens were the other two gods in that trinity. (Note: The Vedic idea that the sun, lightning, and fire were different manifestation of the same element and principle is summarized in many Hindu texts, such as the ancient Bṛhaddevatā.) His position and importance evolves over time, in the "creator-preserver-destroyer" aspects of existence in Hindu thought. (Note: The Trimurti idea of Hinduism, states Jan Gonda, "seems to have developed from ancient cosmological and ritualistic speculations about the triple character of an individual god, in the first place of Agni, whose births are three or threefold, and who is threefold light, has three bodies and three stations". Other trinities, beyond the more common "Brahma, Vishnu, Shiva", mentioned in ancient and medieval Hindu texts include: "Indra, Vishnu, Brahmanaspati"; "Agni, Indra, Surya"; "Agni, Vayu, Aditya"; "Mahalakshmi, Mahasarasvati, and Mahakali"; and others.)

The Shatapatha Brahmana mentions there have been three previous Agnis who died and current Agni is the fourth one now.

"Fourfold, namely, was Agni (the fire god) at first. Now that Agni whom they at first chose for the office of Hotri priest died. He also whom they chose the second time died. He also whom they chose the third time died. Thereupon the one who still constitutes the fire in our own time, concealed himself from fear. He entered into the waters. Him the deities discovered and brought out away from the waters as the fourth fire god." – 1:2:3:1

== Texts ==
=== Vedas ===
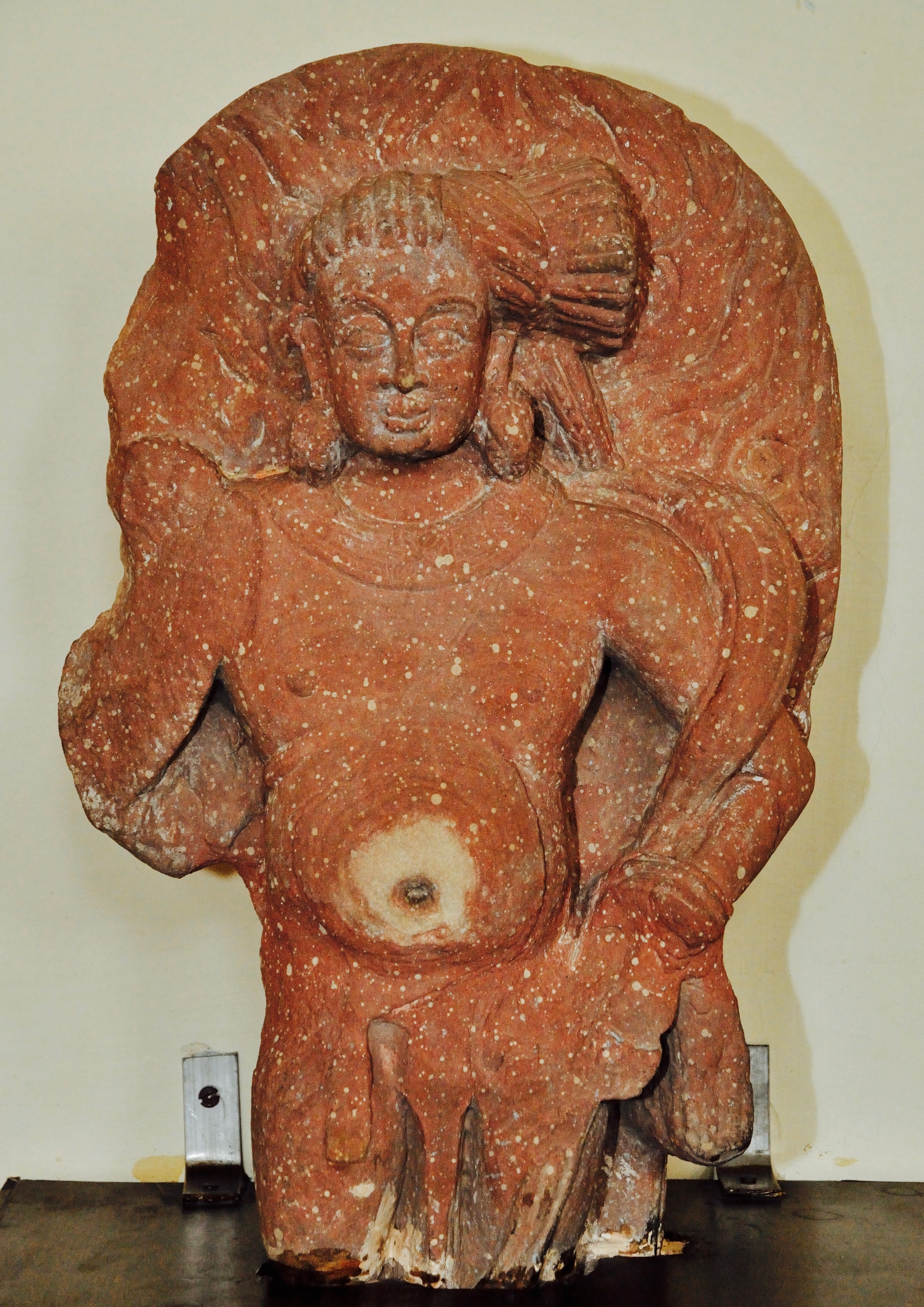
A pre-3rd century CE, Kushan Empire era red-stone Agni statue. Art of Mathura.

In the Hindu pantheon, Agni occupies, after Indra, the most important position. Agni is prominent in the hymns of the Vedas and particularly the Brahmanas. In the Rigveda there are over 200 hymns that praise Agni. His name or synonyms appear in nearly a third of 1,028 hymns in the Rigveda. The Rigveda opens with a hymn inviting Agni, who is then addressed later in the hymn as the guardian of Ṛta (Dharma). (Note: Other hymns of the Rigveda link Ṛta (cosmic harmony) to other Vedic deities, such as verse 10.133.6 calls on Indra for guidance on Ṛta.)

The Vedas describe the foster-parents of Agni as two kindling fire sticks of Prajapati, whose loving action creates him. Just born, he is poetically presented as a tender baby, who needs loving attention lest he vanishes. With care, he sparks and smokes, then flames and grows stronger than his foster-parents, finally so strong that he burns to ashes what created him his residence by Prajapati.

The hymns in these ancient texts refer to Agni with numerous epithets and synonyms, such as Jātaveda (he who knows all knowledge), Vaiśvānara (he who is relating to all people), Tanūnapāta (he who is self-made), Narāśaṃsa (he who embodies all people's praise), Tripatsya (he who is with three dwellings), and many others. In Hindu mythology, Agni is also presented as one who is mysterious with a tendency to play hide and seek, not just with humans but with the deities. He hides in strange places such as waters, where in one myth, he imbues life force into fishes that dwell therein, due to which the fishes report his presence to the deities, who take Agni to heaven.

Agni is in hymn 10.124 of the Rigveda, a Rishi (sage-poet-composer) and along with Indra and Sūrya makes up the Hindu trinity of gods who create, preserve, destroy.

Agni is considered equivalent to all the deities in the Hinduism, which formed the foundation for the various non-dualistic and monistic theologies of Hinduism. These theme of equivalence is repeatedly presented in the Vedas, such as with the following words in the Maṇḍala 1 of the Rigveda:

They call it Indra, Mitra, Varuna, Agni,
and he is heavenly-winged Garuda.
To what is One, sages give many a title,
they call it Agni, Yama, Matarisvan (Agni).

— Rigveda 1.164.46, Translator: Klaus Klostermaier

=== Upanishads ===
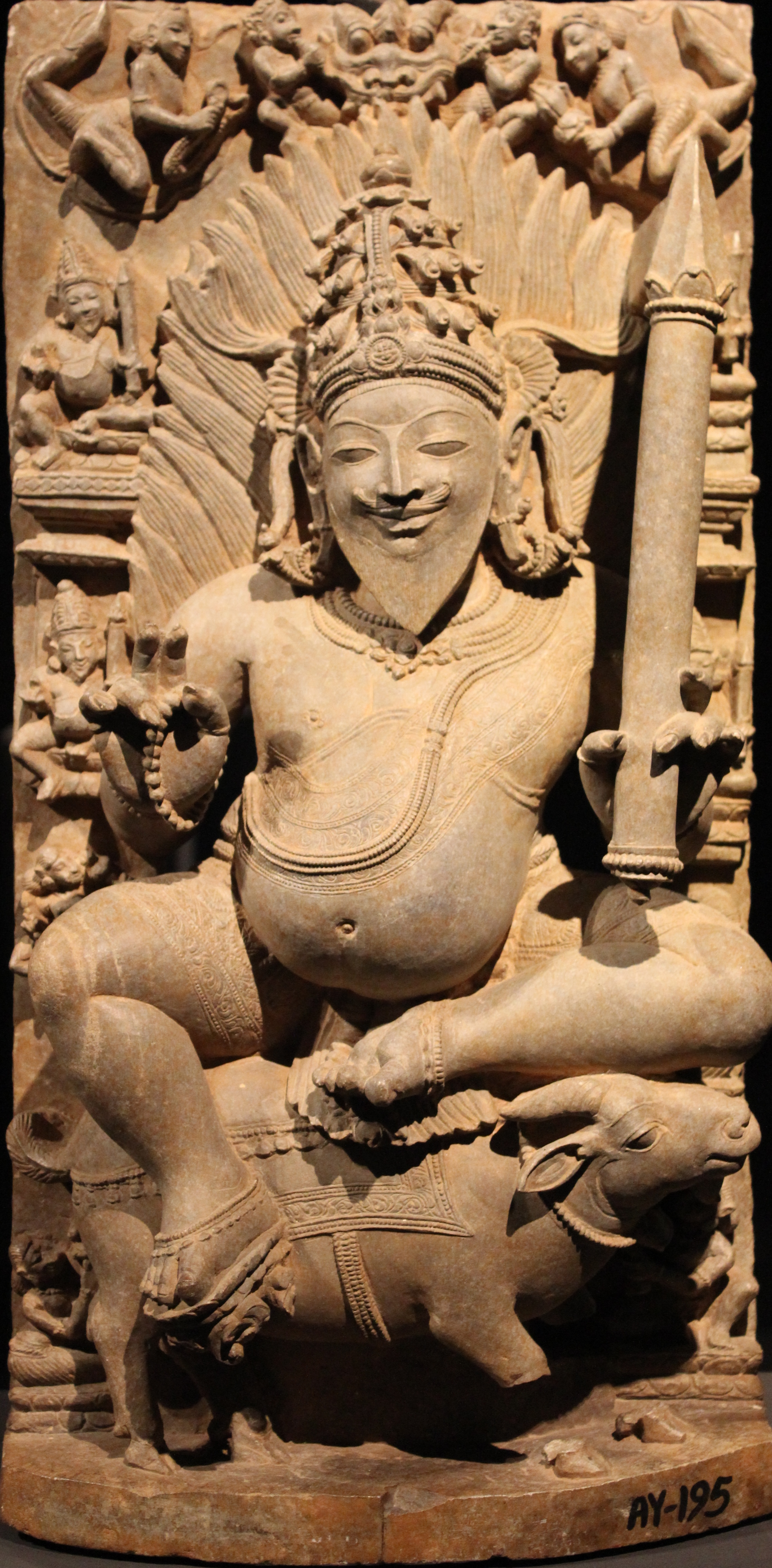
Agni with an aura of flames, seated on ram

Agni features prominently in the major and minor Upanishads of Hinduism. Among the earliest mention is the legend of a boy sage named Satyakāma Jābāla, the son of an unwed father and an unwed mother, in chapter 4 of the Chhāndogya Upanishad (~700 BCE). He honestly admits his poverty and that his mother does not know who his father was, an honesty that earns him a spot in a Hindu school (gurukula). During his studies, the boy sage meets Agni, who then becomes the god for him as a cardinal direction, world body, eye and knowledge, and the abstract principle of Brahman which the Upanishad states is in everything and is everywhere and he becomes a boy sage. Agni appears in section 1.13 of Chandogya Upanishad as well.

In verse 18 of the Isha Upanishad, Agni is invoked with, "O Agni, you know all the paths, lead me on to success by the good path, keep me away from the wrong path of sin". (Note: This prayer to Agni appears in Rigveda verse 1.89.1, composed before 1200 BCE.) In sections 4.5–6 of the Maitri Upanishad, the students ask their Hindu Guru (teacher) Maitri about which deity is best among deities they name, a list that includes Agni. The Guru replies that they are all supreme, all merely forms of the Brahman, the whole world is Brahman. So pick anyone, says the Upanishad, meditate and adore that one, then meditate over them all, then deny and discard the individuality of every one of these deities including of Agni, thus journey unto the universal reality, for a communion with the Purusha, which is the Ātman.

Sections 3 and 4 of Kena Upanishad, another major ancient Upanishad, presents a story which includes gods Agni, Vayu, Indra and goddess Parvati. After a battle between good deities and evil demons, where the deities kill all the demons and win, the deities wonder, "what is this Brahman, a wonderful being?" Agni goes first to find out, but fails. Vayu too goes to find out and fails. Then Indra tries and fails, but meets the Parvati who already understands Brahman, explains what Brahman is and how the deities reached victory through the nature of Brahman. Indra shares this knowledge with Agni and Vayu. The Kena Upanishad closes these sections by stating that "Agni, Vayu, Indra" are revered first because they were the first among the deities to realize Brahman from Parvati. The allegorical legend, states Paul Deussen, aims to teach that all the Hindu deities and natural things have their basis in the timeless, universal monistic principle called Brahman.

Another ancient major Hindu scripture named Prashna Upanishad mentions Agni in its second Prashna (question section). The section states that Agni and other deities manifest as five gross constituents that combine to make the entire universe, and that all the deities are internalized in the temple of a living body with Agni as the eyes.

Agni is mentioned in many minor Upanishads, such as the Pranagnihotra Upanishad, the Yogatattva Upanishad, the Yogashikha Upanishad, the Trishikhibrahmana Upanishad and others. The syncretic and monistic Shaivism and Shaktism text, namely Rudrahridaya Upanishad states that Shiva is same as Agni, and Parvati is same as Svaha.

Mundaka Upanishad (2.4) mentioned the seven tongues of Agni as kālī, karālī, manojavā, sulohita, sudhāmravarṇā, sphuliṅginī, visvarucī.

== Significance ==
Vedic rituals involve Agni. He is a part of many Hindu rites-of-passage ceremonies such as celebrating a birth (lighting a lamp), prayers (aarti lamp), at weddings (the yajna where the bride and groom circle the fire seven times) and at death (cremation). According to Atharvaveda, it is Agni that conveys the soul of the dead from the pyre to be reborn in the next world or life. However, this role was in post-Vedic texts subsumed in the role of god Yama. Agni has been important in temple architecture, is typically present in the southeast corner of a Hindu temple.

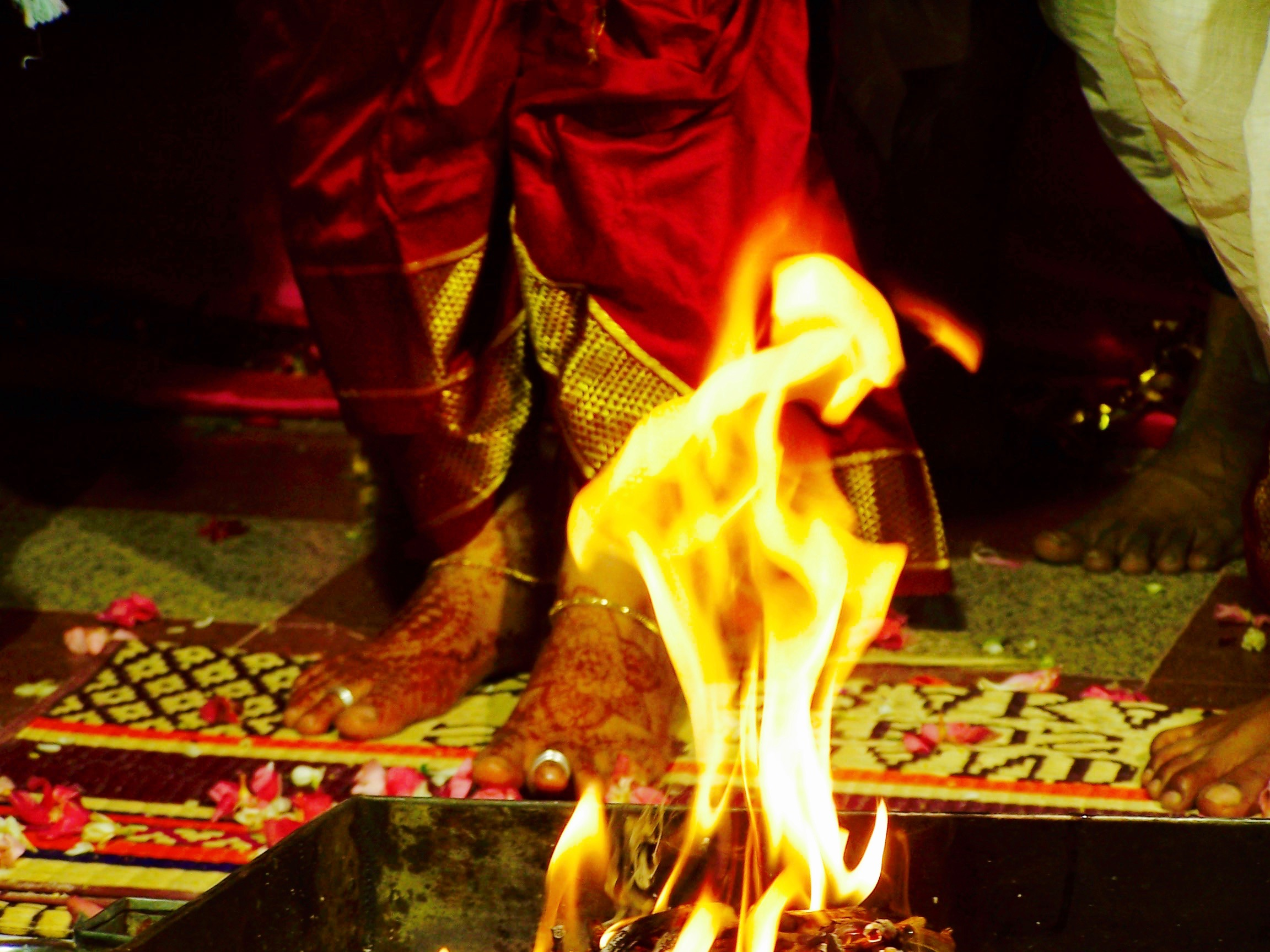
Saptapadi, a Hindu wedding ritual, around Agni in progress

=== Rites of passage: Hindu wedding ===
The most important ritual of Hindu weddings is performed around Agni. It is called the Saptapadi (Sanskrit for "seven steps"), and it represents the legal part of Hindu marriage. The ritual involves a couple completing seven actual or symbolic circuits around the Agni, which is considered a witness to the vows they make to each other. (Note: The two rake the holy vow in the presence of Agni ... In the first four rounds, the bride leads and the groom follows, and in the final three, the groom leads and the bride follows. While walking around the fire, the bride places her right palm on the groom's right palm and the bride's brother pours some unhusked rice or barley into their hands and they offer it to the fire ...) Each circuit of the consecrated fire is led by both the bride or the groom, varying by community and region. With each circuit, the couple makes a specific vow to establish some aspect of a happy relationship and household for each other, with Agni as the divine witness to those mutual vows. In the Indian subcontinent and Suriname, the bride leads the first four circuits followed by the groom leading the last three circuits.

=== Rituals: Agnihotra ===
The Agnihotra involves fire, and the term refers to the ritual of keeping fire at home, and in some cases making "sacrificial offerings" such as milk and seeds to this fire. The Srauta texts state that it is the duty of man to perform Agnihotra. A wide range of Agnihotra procedures are found in the Brahmana layer of the Vedas, ranging from the most common simple keeping of sacred fire and its symbolism, to more complicated procedures for the expiation of guilt, to rituals claimed to grant immortality to the performer. According to the Jaiminiya Brahmana, for example, an Agnihotra sacrifice frees the performer from evil and death. In contrast, states the Shatapatha Brahmana, Agnihotra is a symbolic reminder and equivalent to the Sun, where the fire keeper is reminded of the heat that creates life, the fire in beings, the heat in the womb behind the cycle of life.

=== Festivals: Holi and Deepavali ===
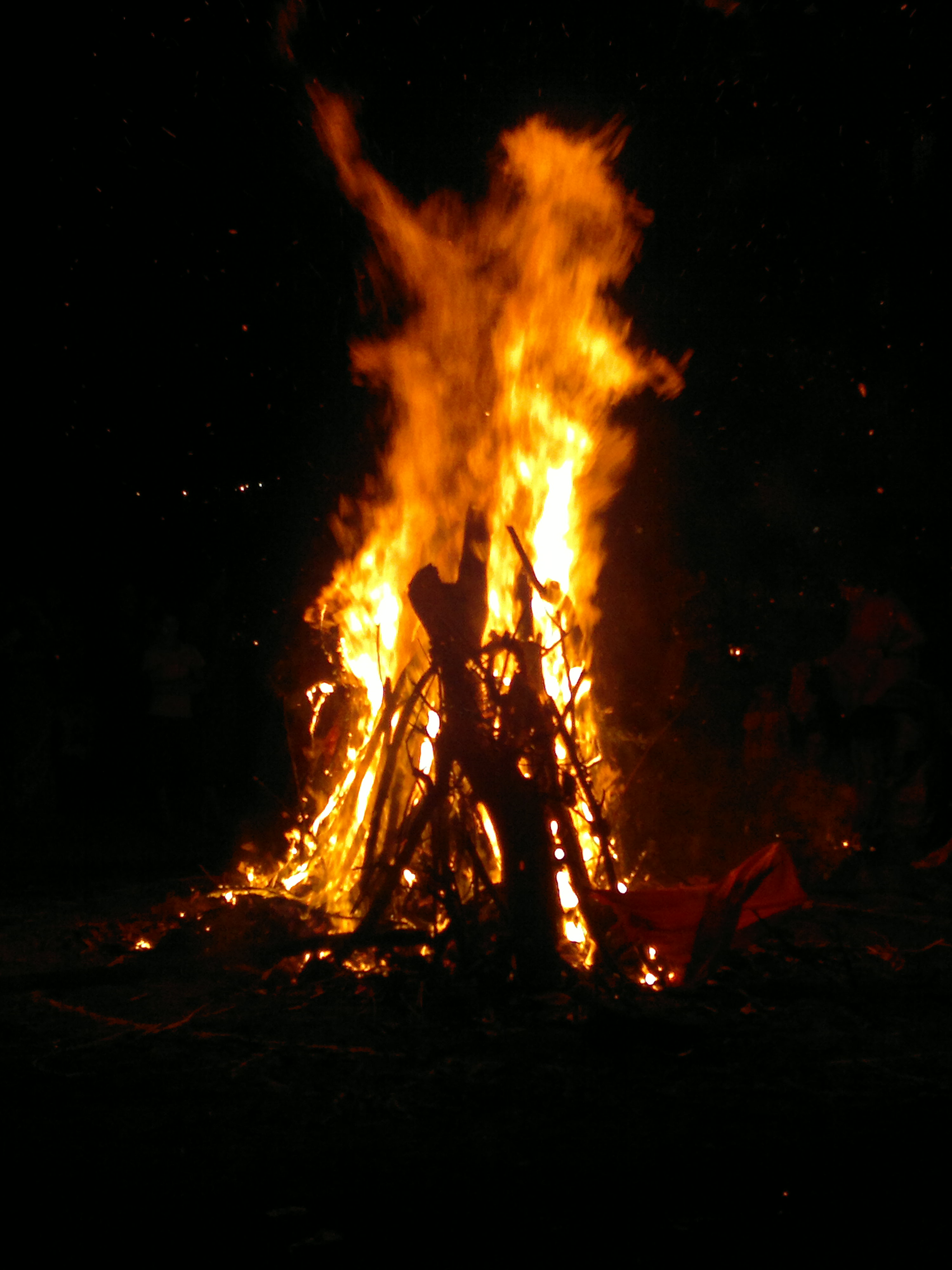
Agni is a part of the ritual grammar in many Hindu festivals. Above Holika for Holi, includes Agni.

Two major festivals in Hinduism, namely Holi (festival of colors) and Deepavali (festival of lights) incorporate Agni in their ritual grammar, as a symbol of divine energy. During the autumn celebrations of Deepavali, traditional small fire lamps called Diya are included to mark the festivities. For Holi, Hindus burn bonfires as Holika, on the night before the spring festival. The bonfire marks god Agni, and in the Indian subcontinent, mothers and fathers carry their babies around the fire clockwise on Holika in Agni's remembrance.

=== Forms ===
Agni has two forms: Jataveda and Kravyada:

- Jātaveda is the fire that carries the quid-pro-quo offerings to the deities, in which case Agni is light identified with knowledge and with Brahman. In the Jātaveda form, "He who knows all creatures", Agni acts as the divine model for the priest. He is the messenger who carries the oblation from humans to the deities, bringing the deities to the sacrifices, and intercedes between deities and humans (Rig Veda I.26.3). Together with Indra and Soma, Agni is invoked in the Rig Veda more than any of the other deities.
- Kravyāda (क्रव्याद) is the form of Agni which cremates corpses, the fire of the funeral pyre that triggers the recycling of matter and spirit. In this way, states Shatapatha Brahmana in verse 2.2.4.8, after one's death and at the time of cremation, Agni heats up and burns only the body, yet by its heat, one is reborn.

=== Symbolism ===
Agni is symbolism for psychological and physiological aspects of life, states Maha Purana section LXVII.202–203. There are three kinds of Agni inside every human being, states this text, the krodha-agni or "fire of anger", the kama-agni or "fire of passion and desire", and the udara-agni or "fire of digestion". These respectively need introspective and voluntary offerings of forgiveness, detachment and fasting, if one desires spiritual freedom, liberation.

Agni variously denotes the natural element fire, the supernatural deity symbolized by fire and the inner natural will aspiring for the highest knowledge.

Heat, combustion and energy is the realm of Agni which symbolizes the transformation of the gross to the subtle; Agni is the life-giving energy. Agnibija is the consciousness of tapas (proto-cosmic energy); agni (the energizing principle); the sun, representing the Reality (Brahman) and the Truth (Satya), is Rta, the order, the organizing principle of everything that is.

Agni, who is addressed as Atithi ('guest'), is also called Jatavedasam (जातवेदसम्), meaning "the one who knows all things that are born". (Note: Rig Veda I.xliv.4) He symbolizes will-power united with wisdom.

Agni is the essence of the knowledge of Existence. Agni destroys ignorance and all delusions, removes nescience. The Kanvasatpathabrahmanam (SB.IV.i.iv.11) calls Agni "wisdom" (मेधायैमनसेऽग्नये स्वाहेति). Agni is symbolism for "the mind swiftest among (all) those that fly".

== Iconography ==
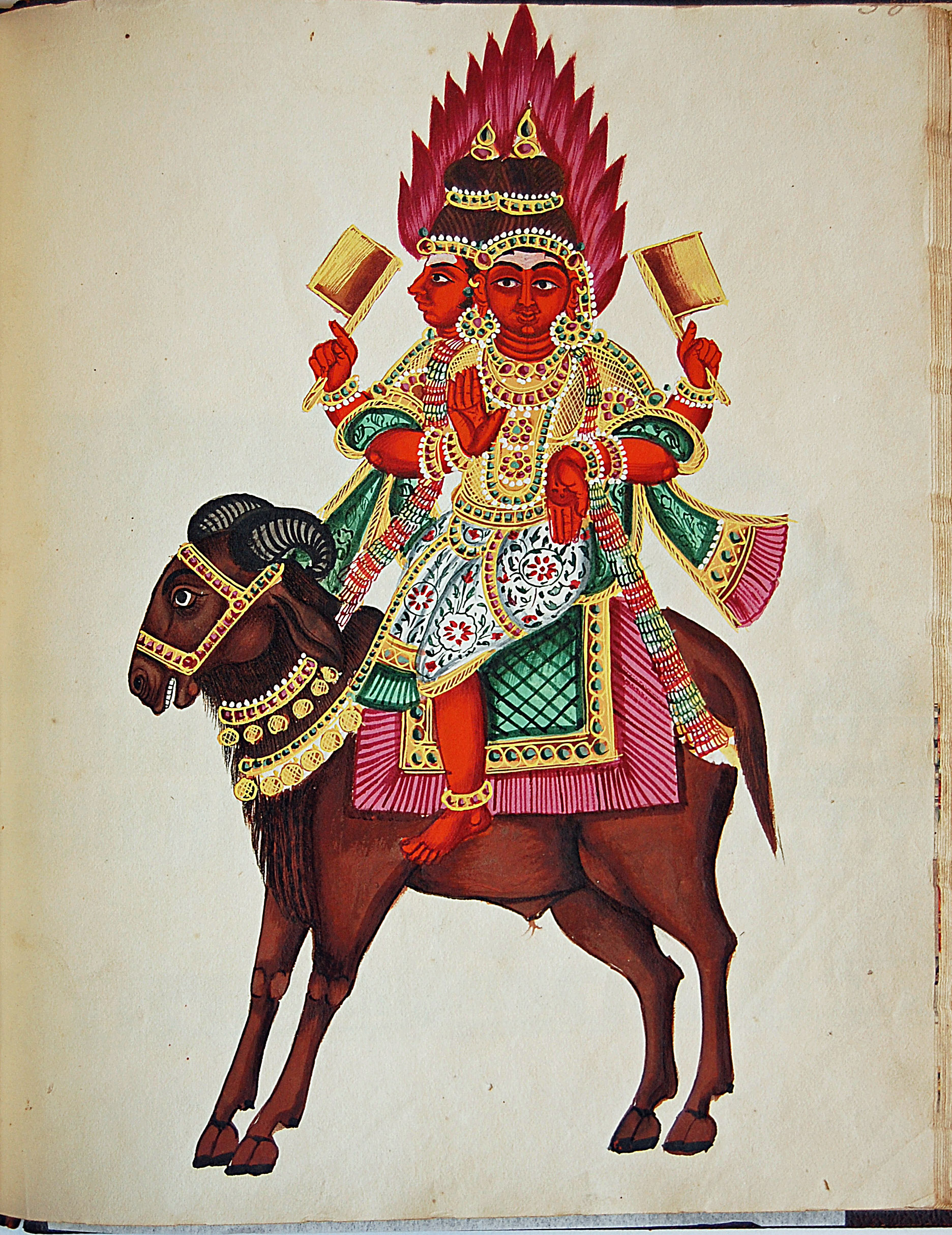
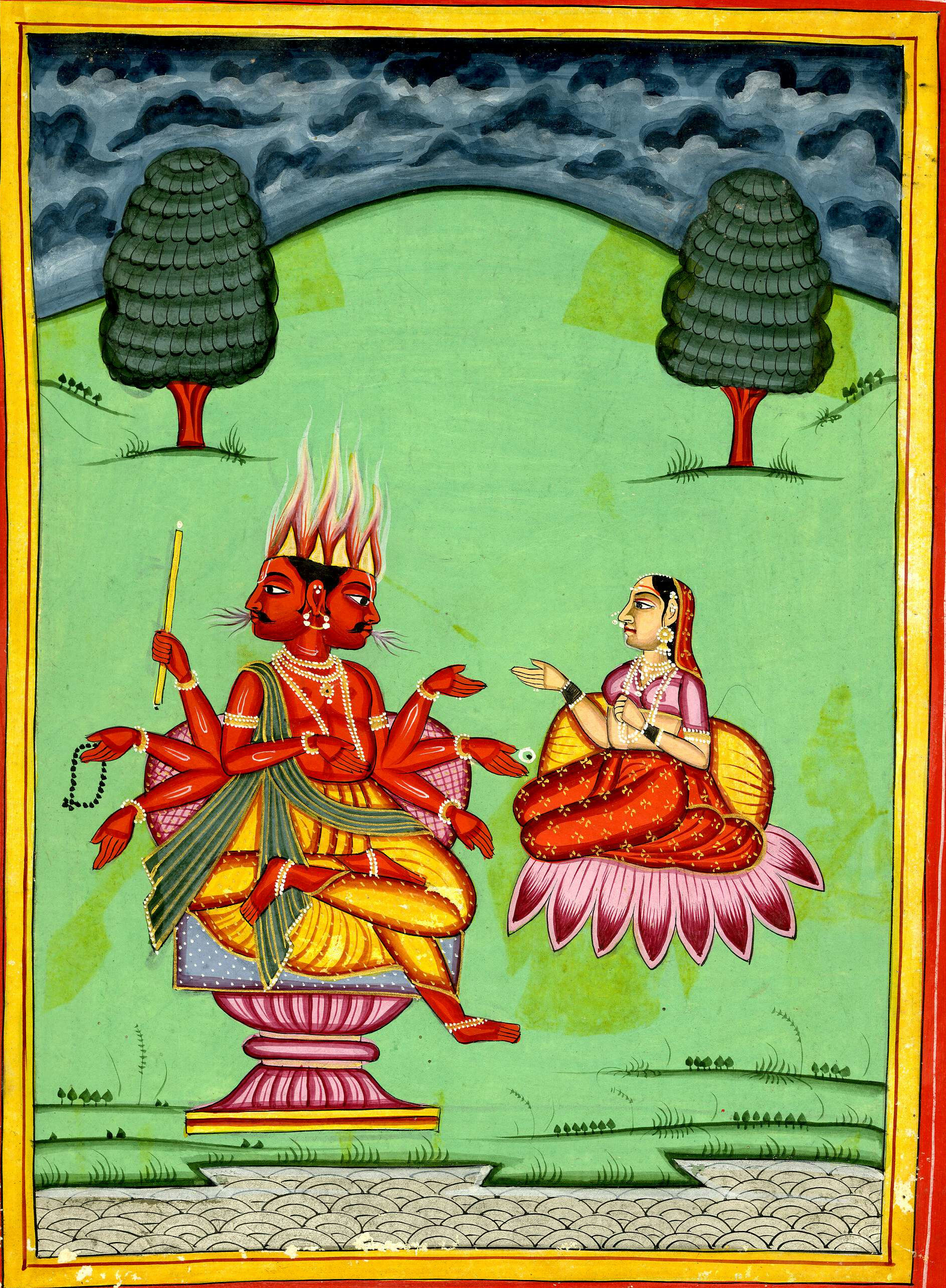
The icons for Agni show wide regional variations. Left: Agni on ram, Right: Agni with goddess Svaha.

The iconography of Agni varies by region. The design guidelines and specifications of his iconography are described in the Hindu Agama texts. He is shown with one to three heads, two to four arms, is typically red-complexioned or smoky-grey complexioned standing next to or riding a ram, with a characteristic dramatic halo of flames leaping upwards from his crown. He is shown as a strong looking man, sometimes bearded, with a large belly because he eats everything offered into his flames, with golden brown hair, eyes and mustache to match the color of fire.

Agni holds a rosary in one hand to symbolize his prayer-related role, and a sphere in another hand in eastern states of India. In other regions, his four arms hold an ax, torch, spoon (or fan) a flaming spear (or rosary).

Seven rays of light or flames emit from his body. One of his names is Saptajihva, "the one having seven tongues", to symbolize how rapidly he consumes sacrificial butter. Occasionally, Agni iconography is shown in Rohitasva form, which has no ram as his vahana, but where he is pulled in a chariot with seven red horses, and the symbolic wind that makes fire move as the wheels of the chariot. In Cambodian art, Agni has been depicted with a rhinoceros as his vahana. The number seven symbolizes his reach in all seven mythical continents in ancient Hindu cosmology where Agni lives and also the seven colours of a rainbow in his form as the sun.

Agni has three forms, namely fire, lightning, and the Sun, forms sometimes symbolized by giving his icon three heads or three legs. He sometimes is shown wearing a garland of fruits or flowers, symbolic of the offerings made into the fire.

=== History ===
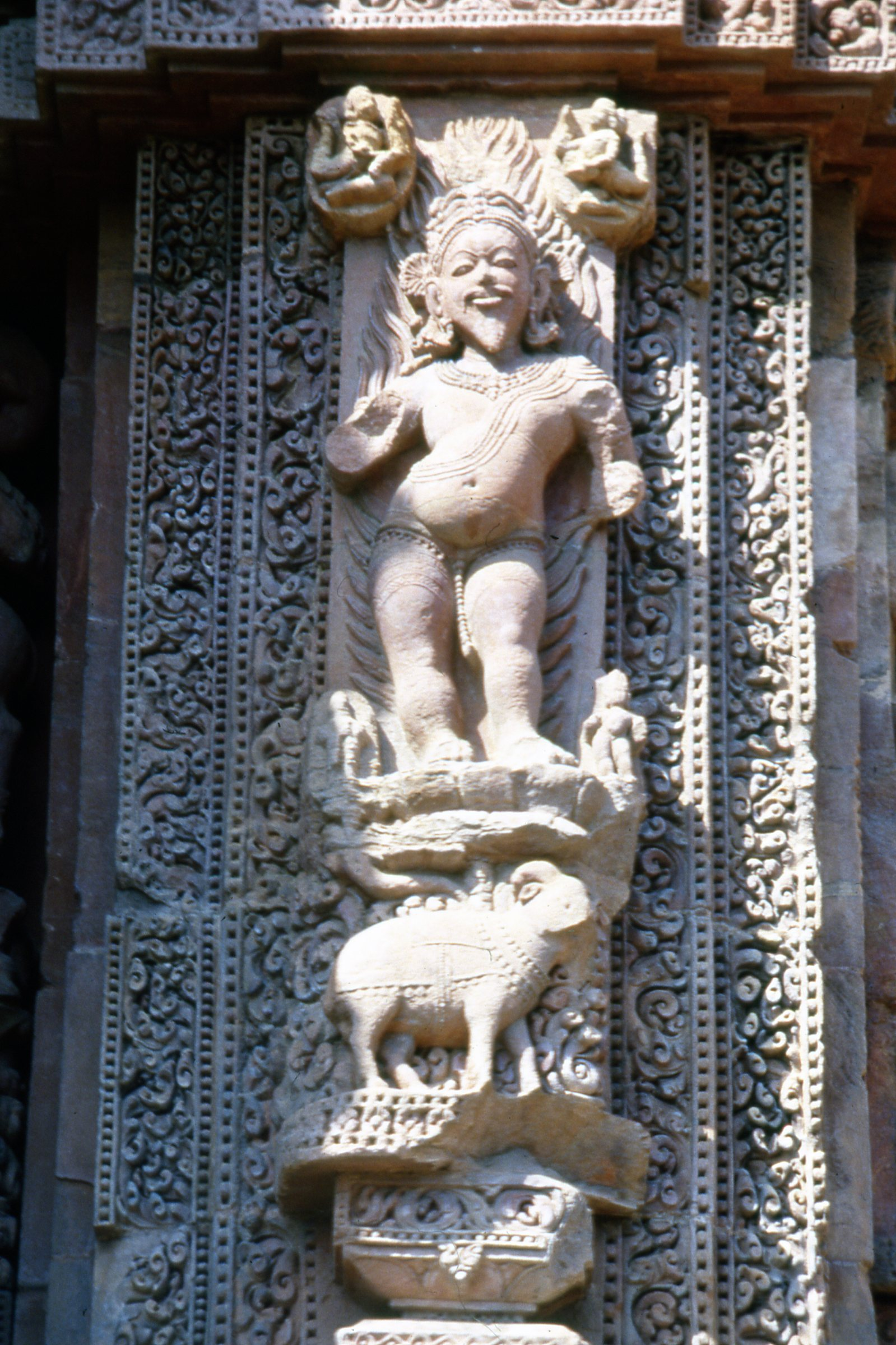
Agni in the southeast corner of the 11th-century CE Rajarani Temple in Bhubaneshwar, Odisha. His ram mount is below him.

The earliest surviving artwork of Agni have been found at archaeological sites near Mathura (Uttar Pradesh), and these date from 1st-century BCE. In the collection at Bharata Kalā Bhavana, there is a red sandstone sculpture from around the start of the common era but no later than 1st-century CE, identifiable as Agni shown in the garb of a Brahmana, very much like sage Kashyapa. In the Panchala coins of Agnimitra, Agni is always present with a halo of flames. In Gupta sculptures, Agni is found with a halo of flames round the body, the sacred thread across his chest, a beard, pot-bellied and holding in his right hand a amrtaghata (nectar-pot). Many of these early carvings and early statues show just one head, but elaborate details such as ear-rings made of three fruits, a detailed necklace, a slightly smiling face wearing a crown, and flames engraved into the hairs at the back of Agni's statue.

The iconographic statues and reliefs of god Agni are typically present in the southeast corners of a Hindu temple. However, in rare temples where Agni is envisioned as a presiding astrological divinity, according to texts such as the Samarangana Sutradhara, he is assigned the northeast corner.

Agni is historically considered to be present in every grihastha (home), and therein presented in one of three forms – gārhapatya (for general domestic usage), āhavaniya (for inviting and welcoming a personage or deity) and dakshinagni (for fighting against all evil). Yāska states that his predecessor Sākapuṇi regarded the threefold existence of Agni as being in earth, air and heaven as stated by the Rig Veda, and the Brāhmanas considered the three manifestations of Agni to be the fire, the lightning, the sun.

== Mythologies ==
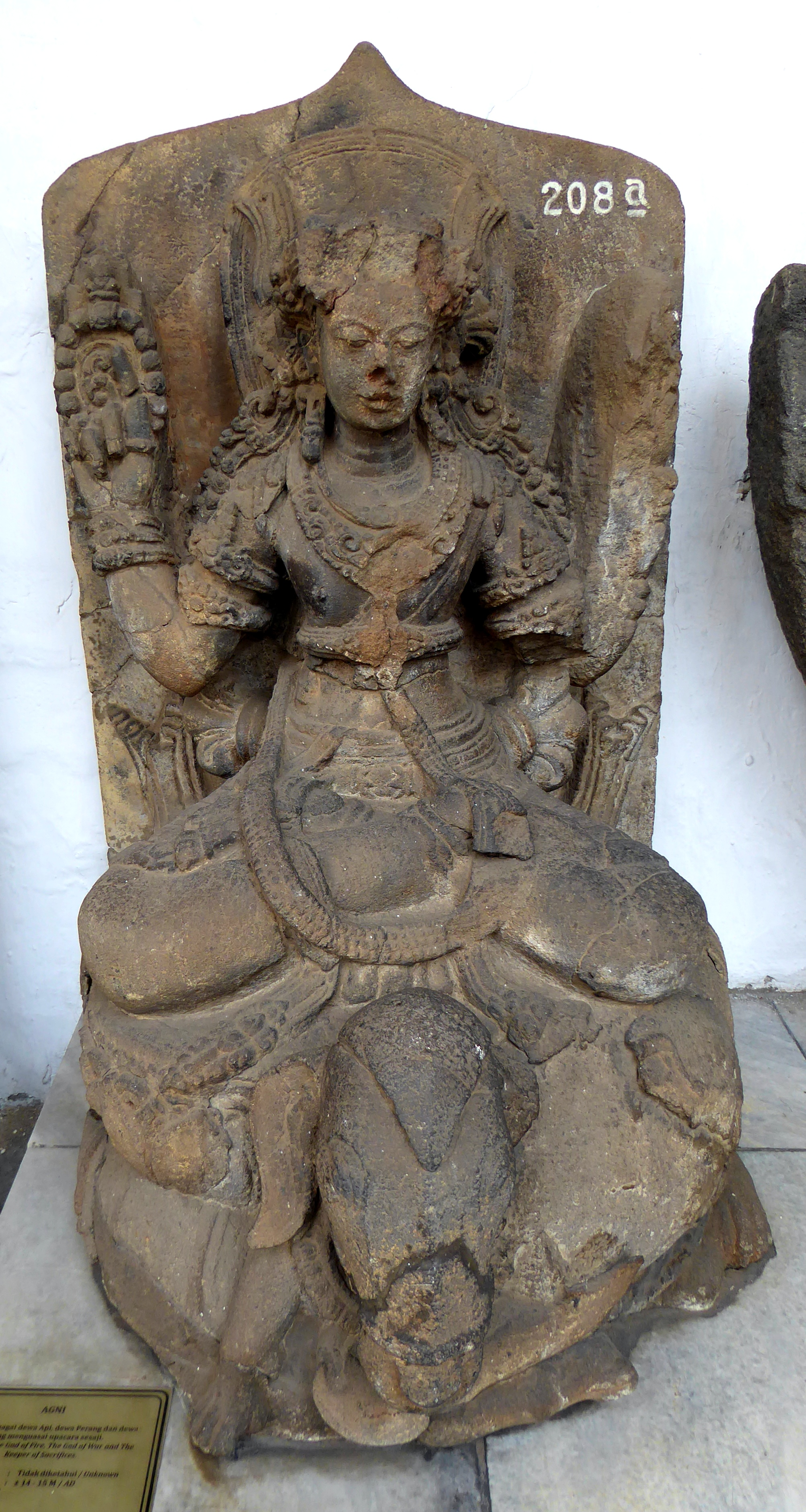
Agni seated on his ram, 14th century CE – 15th century CE statue from Indonesia

A sage of the Ṛg Veda (Sūkta IV.iii.11) states that the Sun became visible when Agni was born.

=== Epics ===
Offended by Agni, Bhṛgu had cursed Agni to become the devourer of all things on this earth, but Brahma modified that curse and made Agni the purifier of all things he touched.

In the "Khāṇḍava-daha Parva" (Mahābhārata CCXXV), Agni in disguise approaches Krishna and Arjuna seeking sufficient food for gratification of his hunger; and on being asked about the kind of food which would gratify, Agni expressed the desire to consume the forest of Khāṇḍava protected by Indra for the sake of Takṣaka, the chief of the Nāgas. Aided by Krishna and Arjuna, Agni consumes the Khāṇḍava Forest, which burnt for fifteen days, sparing only Ashvasena, Maya, and the four birds called sarangakas; later, as a boon Arjuna got all his weapons from Indra and also the bow, Gāṇḍīva, from Varuṇa.

There is the story about King Shibi who was tested by Agni assuming the form of a pigeon and by Indra assuming the form of a hawk; Shibi offered his own flesh to the hawk in exchange of pigeon's life. The pigeon which had sought Shibi's shelter was thus saved by the king's sacrifice from the hawk and then, Indra and Agni restore Shibi to his intact state and bless him to live happily then.

Agniparīkṣā or 'the Fire test' has Agni as the witness. In the Rāmāyaṇa, Sītā voluntarily goes through this ordeal to prove her virtue and then proves that she is chaste without any adultery.

=== Puranas ===
Agni is a son of Brahma as a Pancha Bhuta god. In the Vishnu Purana, Agni, called Abhimāni is said to have sprung from the mouth of the Virāta Puruṣa, the Cosmic Man, a form of Vishnu after being born from Brahma. In another incident later, Agni after being born to Brahma, rises from the ritual fire produced by Dharma and Vasubhāryā.

According to the Puranic mythology, Agni married Svāhā (invocation offering) and fathered three sons – Pāvaka (purifier), Pāvamāna (purifying) and Śuchi (purity). From these sons, he has forty-five grandchildren which are symbolic names of different aspects of a fire. Also, Medhā (intelligence) is Agni's sister.

== Relationships ==
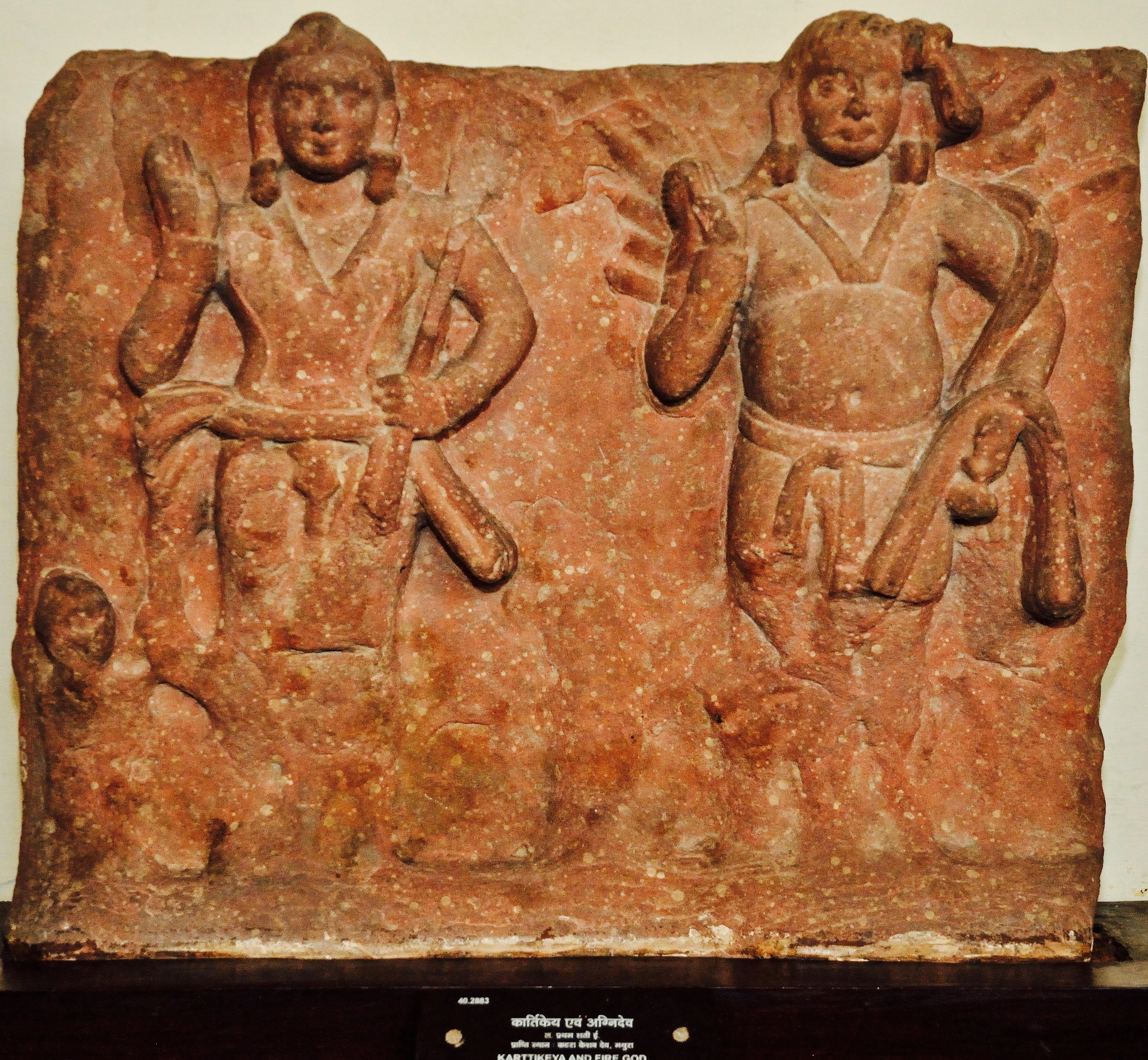
Agni with his companion Kartikeya, 1st-century CE.

=== Wife and children ===
The goddess Svāhā is Agni's wife. Her name is pronounced with offerings such as butter and seeds poured into the fire during ceremonies. However, like many names in Hindu traditions, the name Svāhā embeds symbolic meanings, through its relationship with the Vedic word Svadhā found in the hymns of the Rigveda. Thomas Coburn states that the term Svadhā refers to "one's own particular nature or inclination", and the secondary sense of "a customary pleasure or enjoyment, a refreshment that nourishes". Svāhā is also found in the hymns of the Vedic literature, in the sense of "welcome, praise to you". This salutation is a remembrance of Agni, as an aspect of that which is "the source of all beings". As a goddess and wife of Agni, Svāhā represents this shakti.

In the Mahabharata's earlier chapters, Svāhā is the daughter of Daksha and Asikini who develops feelings for Agni. She seduces him by successively taking the forms of the six wives of the Saptarishi except Arundhati, the wife of Vashishta as she is virtuous with him because that Agni desired them as his wives, and thus with him has a son who is the god Skanda – the god of war. The later chapters of the Mahabharata show that he was the son of the god Shiva and goddess Parvati.

The Mahābhārata also mentions that when Agni was residing at Mahishmati, he fell in love with the foster-daughter of king Nila, a form of Svaha. In the guise of a Brahmana, he asked for the hand to her, but the king refused and was about to kill him. Agni revealed his true form and flamed up in glory to Svaha. The king understood and bestowed this form of Svaha as his foster-daughter on Agni. In return, Agni and Svaha destroyed enemy forces of that king and saved him and others from chaos and flourished them with the Pandavas and their forces later.

=== Other gods ===
Agni is identified with same characteristics, equivalent personality and stated to be identical as many major and minor gods and goddesses in different layers of the Vedic literature, including Vāyu, Soma, Rudra, Varuṇa, Mitra, Savitr, Prajapati, Indra, Vac, Sarama, Gayatri. In hymn 2.1 of the Rigveda, in successive verses, Agni is identified to be the same as twelve gods and five goddesses.

Some of the gods that Agni is identified with:

- Prajāpati: The Vedic text Shatapatha Brahmana, in section 6.1.2 describes how and why Prajāpati is the father of Agni, and also the son of Agni, because they both are the image of the one Ātman (Soul, Self) that was, is and will be the true, eternal identity of the universe. The Prajāpati, cosmic Purusha and Agni are stated to be the same in sections 6.1.1 and 6.2.1 of Shatapatha Brahmana.
- Varuṇa and Mitra: when Agni is born, he is Varuṇa; when he is kindled, he is Mitra. He is also stated to become Varuṇa in the evening, and he is Mitra when he rises in the morning.
- Indra: Agni is generally presented as Indra's twin, they both go and appear together. In chapter 13.3 of the Atharvaveda, Agni is said to become Indra when he illumines the sky. Agni is also called Vishva-Vedā, (Note: विश्ववेदा, appearing in the Taittiriya Samhita (IV.iii.2.10) – अभून्मम सुमतौ विश्ववेदा आष्ट प्रतिष्ठामविदद्धि गाधम्, and in the Rig Veda: * ये पायवो मामतेयं ते अग्ने पश्यन्तो अन्धं दुरितादरक्षन्) "dawn," which refers both to Indra, the Protector, and to the all-knowing Agni.
- Rudra: in the Rigveda Agni is addressed as having the same fierce nature as Rudra. (Note: According to Śatarudriya (oblation) section of the Yajurveda) (Note: In a prayer (R.V.I.27.10) addressed to Agni, the sage prays ": जराबोध तद्विविड्ढि विशेविशे यज्ञियाय) The verses 8 through 18 in section 6.1.3 of the Shatapatha Brahmana state Rudra is same as Agni, who is known by many other names. Later, in section 9.1.1, the Shatapatha Brahmana states, "this entire Agni (fire altar) has now been completed, he is now this god Rudra".
- Savitr: Agni is same as Savitr during the day, as he traverses the space delivering light and energy to all living beings.
- Vāyu and Soma: in the Vedas, Agni or 'fire' (light and heat), Vāyu or 'air' (energy and action), and Soma or 'water', are major deities who cooperate to empower all life. In some passages, they are stated to be aspects of the same energy and principle that transforms.
- Gāyatrī: is identified with Agni in Aitareya Brahmana section 1.1, Jaiminiya Brahmana section 3.184 and Taittiriya Brahmana section 7.8, and the most revered Gayatri meter in the Sanskrit prosody and Hindu traditions is associated with Agni.
- Vāc (goddess of speech) and Prāṇa (life force): are identified with Agni in Jaiminiya Brahmana sections 1.1 and 2.54, Shatapatha Brahmana sections 2.2.2 and 3.2.2.
- Sarama: in a hymn in praise of Agni, (Note: स्वाध्यो दिव आ सप्त यह्वी रायो (Rig Veda I.72.8)) Rishi Parāśara Śāktya speaks of Saramā, the goddess of Intuition, the forerunner of the dawn of Truth in the Human mind, who finds the Truth which is lost. (Note: He says – विदद् गव्यं सरमा दृहमूर्वमं येना नु कं मानुषी भोजते विट् – "Saramā discovered the strong and wide places of the hidden knowledge; this discovery brings happiness to all human beings".) It is Saramā who is a power of the Truth, whose cows are the rays of the dawn of illumination and who awakens man who finds Agni standing in the supreme seat and goal.

== Buddhism ==
=== Canonical texts ===
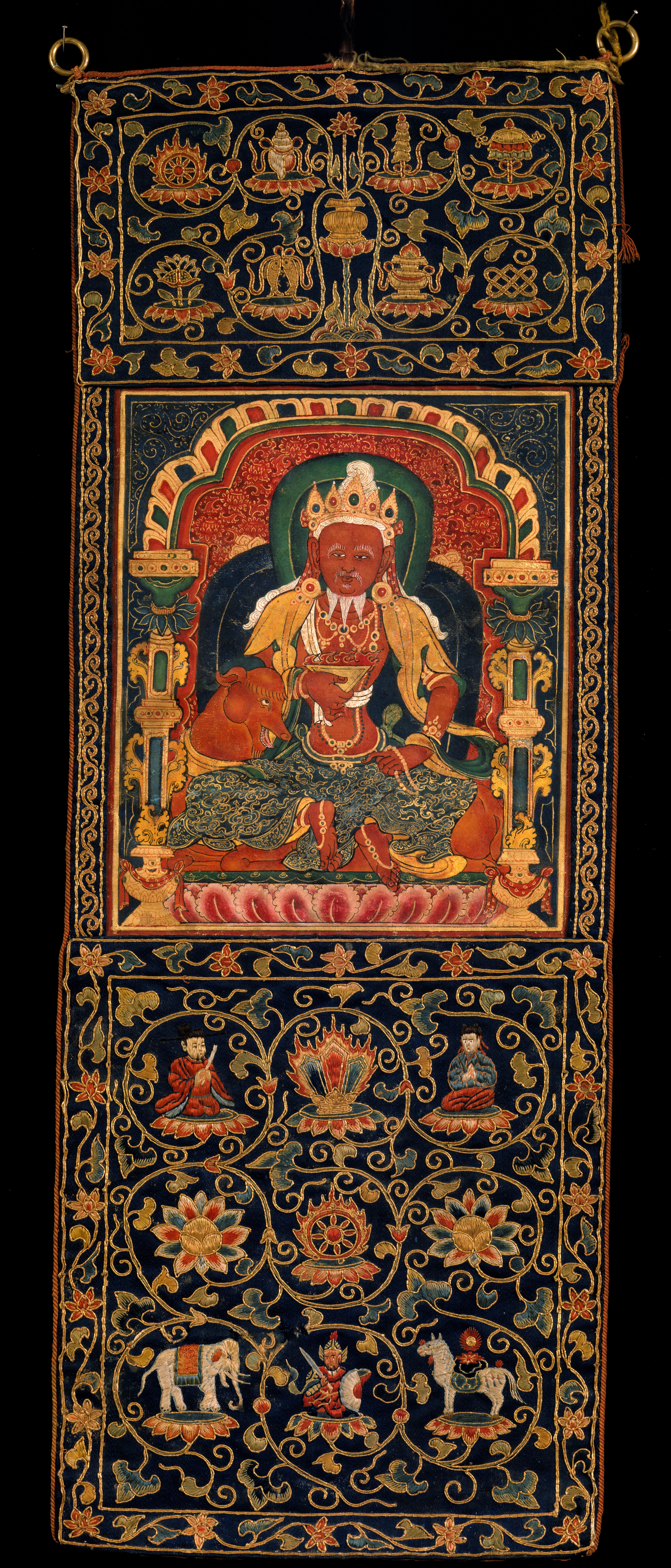
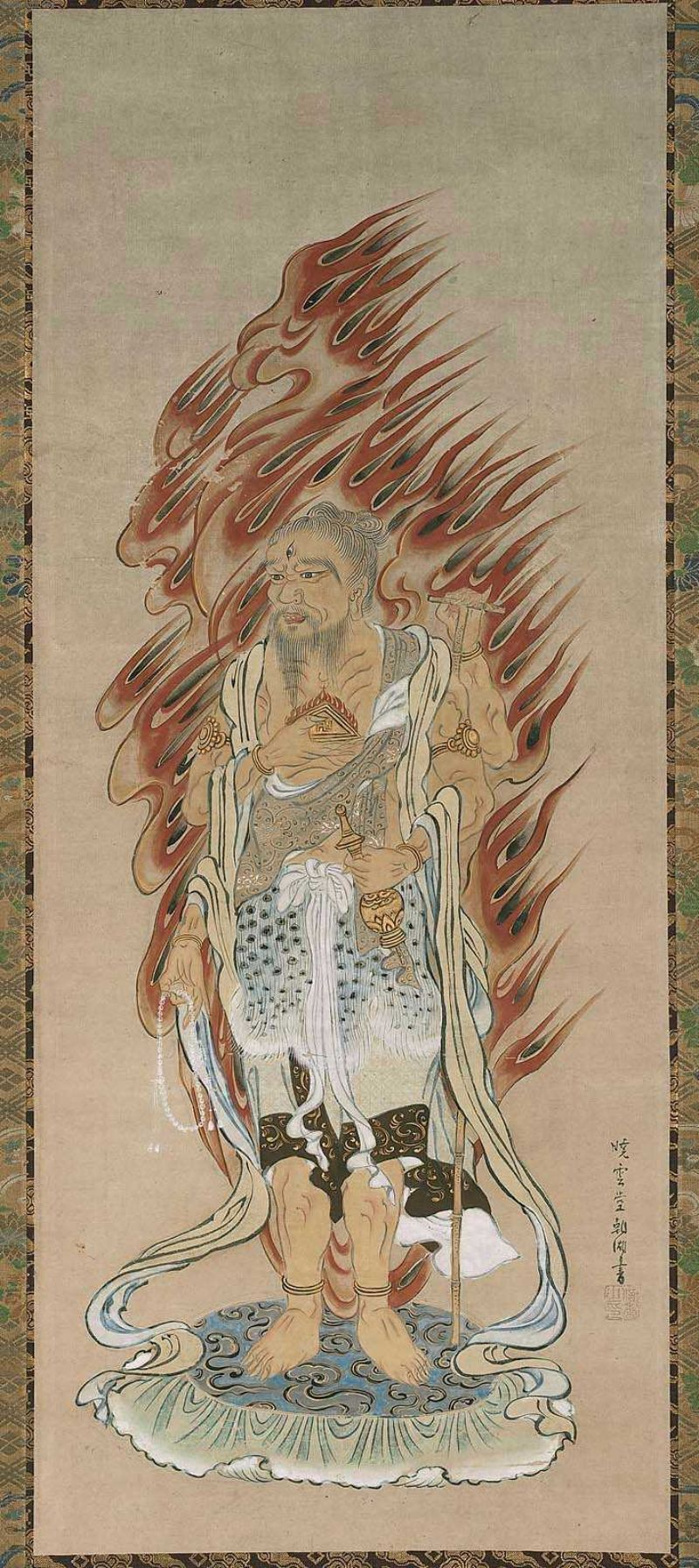
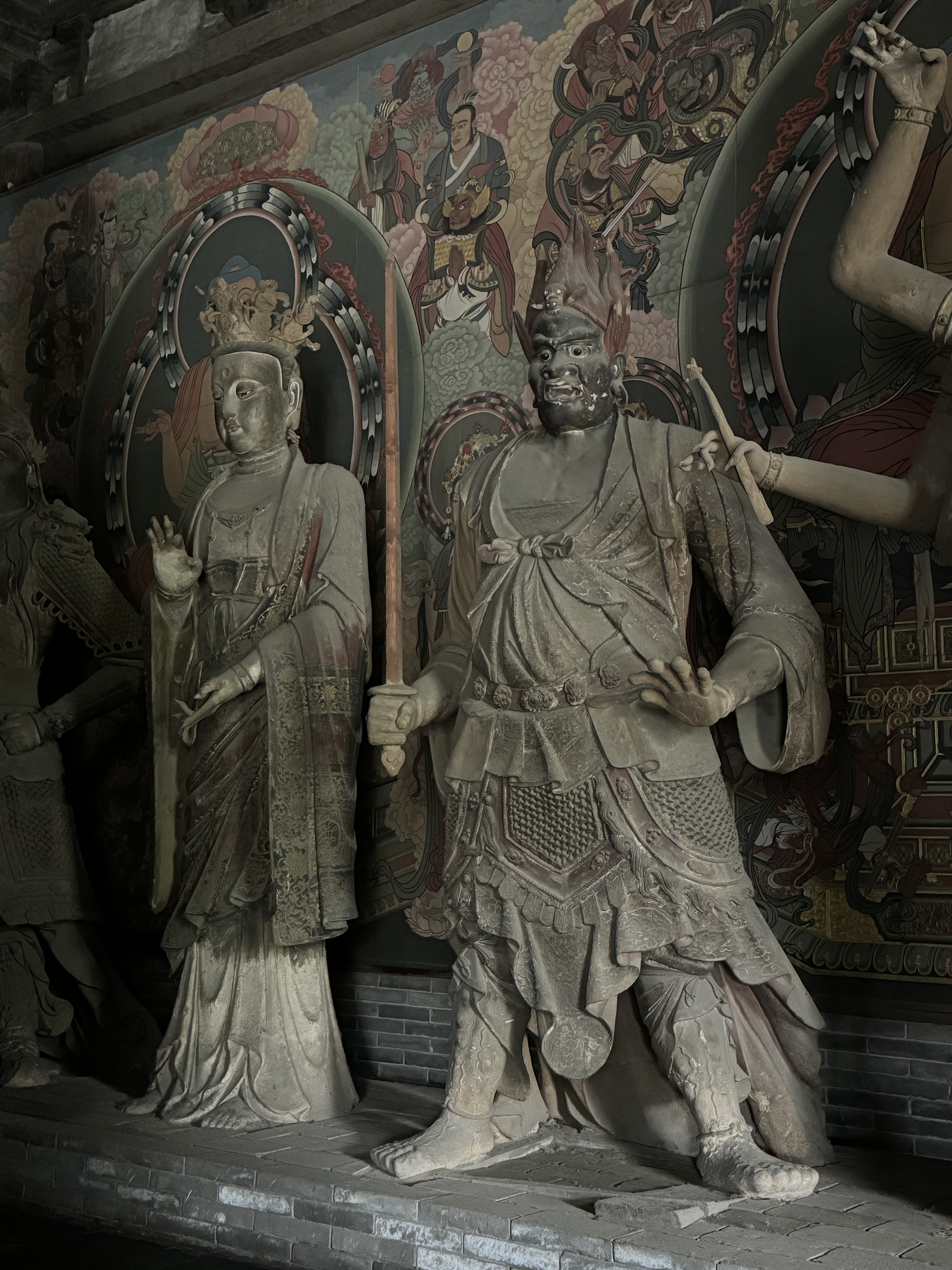
Left: Agni sitting on a red goat, as medicine Buddha in 15th-century Tibetan Buddhist art;
Center: Four-armed Katen (火天) in 17th-century Japan.
Right: Ming dynasty (1368-1644) statue of Huotian (火天) next to another statue of Pṛthvī in Shanhua Temple in Shanxi, China.

Agni (Sanskrit; Pali; Aggi) appears in many Buddhist canonical texts, as both a god as well as a metaphor for the element of heart or fire. In Pali literature, he is also called Aggi-Bhagavā, Jātaveda, and Vessānara.

The Aggi-Vacchagotta Sutta, presents a philosophical exchange between Buddha and a wandering ascetic named Śreṇika Vatsagotra (Sanskrit; Pali: Senika Vacchagotta). The conversation between Buddha and Śreṇika have remained a part of a debate that continues in modern Buddhism. It is called the Śreṇika heresy (Traditional Chinese: 先尼外道; Pinyin: Xiānní wàidào; Romaji: Sennigedō 先尼外道).

Śreṇika suggested that there is an eternal Self (Atman) that lives in a temporary physical body and is involved in rebirth. In the Buddhist traditions, the Buddha taught there is rebirth and Anātman, or that there is no eternal Self. The Pali texts state that Śreṇika disagreed and asked the Buddha many questions, which the Buddha refused to answer, calling his questions as indeterminate. The Buddha clarified that were he to answer Śreṇika's questions, it would "entangle" him. The Buddha explains the Dharma with Agni as a metaphor, stating that just like fire is extinguished and no longer exists after it is extinguished, in the same way all skandha that constitute a human being are extinguished after death. Different versions of this debate appear throughout scripture across traditions, such as the Mahāparinibbāṇa Sutta, and the Mahāprajñāpāramitōpadeśa. In some versions, Śreṇika offers his own simile of Agni to further his views. Scholars such as Nagarjuna have extensively commented on the Śreṇika heresy.

In a manner similar to the Hindu texts, the Buddhist texts also treat Agni (referred to as the fire element Tejas) as a fundamental material and building block of nature. For example, in section 11.31 of the Visuddhimagga as well as the Rūpakaṇḍa section of the Dhammasangani, Agni and Tejas are credited as that which warms, ages, burns and digests food and life processes.

=== Art ===
Agni is featured prominently in the art of the Mahayana tradition.

==== Theraveda Buddhism ====
In Theravada traditions, such as that found in Thailand, Agni is a minor deity. Agni is called Phra Phloeng (also spelled Phra Plerng, literally, "holy flames"). He is commonly depicted with two faces, eight arms, red in color, wearing a headdress in the shape of a gourd, and emitting flames. Medieval era Thai literature describes him as a deity with seven tongues, a purple crown of smoke, and fiery complexion. He rides a horse chariot, a rhinoceros or a ram. Phra Phloeng's wife in these texts is stated to be Svaha. Some Thai texts state Nilanon to be their son among many children.

==== Tibetan Buddhism ====
In Tibet, he is one of the fifty-one Buddhist deities found in the mandala of medicine Buddha. He appears in Tibetan Manjushri's mandalas as well, where he is depicted with Brahma and Indra. The Tibetan iconography for Agni strongly resembles that found in the Hindu tradition, with elements such as red-colored skin, a goat vehicle, conical hair and crown, a beard, and wielding a pot of water or fire in one hand, and rosary beads in the other. Such art will often include Buddhist themes such as the dharma wheel, white conch, golden fish, elephant, the endless knot.

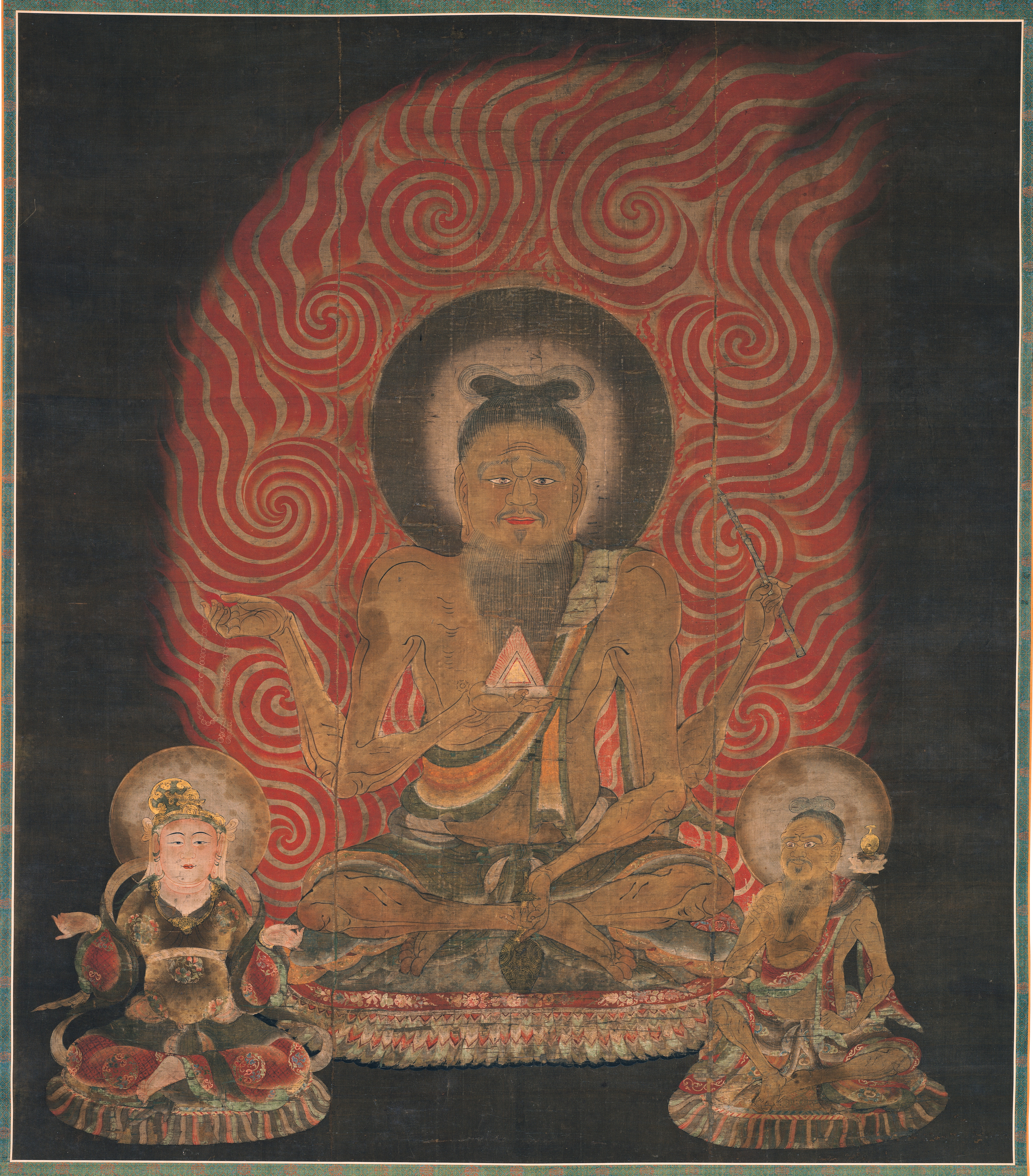
The Buddhist Fire God "Katen" (火天) in Japanese art. Dated 1127 CE, Kyoto National Museum.

==== Japanese Buddhism ====
In Japanese Buddhism, particularly in Mikkyō traditions such as Shingon, Agni is a dharmapāla and often classed as one of a group of twelve deities (Japanese: Jūniten, 十二天) grouped together as directional guardians.In Japan, he is called "Katen" (火天). He is included with the other eleven devas, which include Taishakuten (Śakra), Fūten (Vāyu), Emmaten (Yama), Rasetsuten (Rakshasa) (Note: The ref misidentifies it with Nirṛti), Ishanaten (Īśāna), Bishamonten (Vaiśravaṇa), Suiten (Varuṇa) Bonten (Brahmā), Jiten (Pṛthivī), Nitten (Sūrya), and Gatten (Chandra). While iconography varies, he is often depicted as an elderly mountain ascetic with two or three legs, and two or four arms.

==== Chinese Buddhism ====
In Chinese Buddhism, Agni is a dharmapala known as "Huotian" (火天) and is sometimes rarely classified as being one of the Twenty-Four Protective Deities (Chinese: 二十四諸天; pinyin: Èrshísì Zhūtiān). When he is included in this grouping, the other deities enshrined as part of this grouping include twenty-three devas, which include Dazizaitian (Maheśvara), Fantian (Brahma), Dishitian (Sakra), Jixiang Tiannü (Lakshmi), Biancaitian (Saraswati), the Four Heavenly Kings, Ritian (Surya), Yuetian (Chandra), Miji Jingang (Guhyapāda), Sanzhi Dajiang (Pañcika), Weituo (Skanda), Ditian (Prthivi), Puti Shushen, Guizimu (Hārītī), Molizhitian (Mārīcī), Yanluo Wang (Yama), Fengtian (Vayu), Shuitian (Varuna), Yishenatian (Isana), Luochatian (Rakshasa) and Shensha Dajiang. Examples of this grouping include statues at Shanhua Temple and Tiefo Temple(鐵佛寺), both in Shanxi, China.

== Jainism ==
The word Agni in Jainism refers to fire, but not in the sense of Vedic ideas. Agni appears in Jain thought, as a guardian deity and in its cosmology. He is one of the eight dikpalas, or directional guardian deities in Jain temples, along with these seven: Indra, Yama, Nirrti, Varuna, Vayu, Kubera and Ishana. They are typically standing, with their iconography is similar to those found in Hindu and Buddhist temple pantheon.

In ancient Jain thought, living beings have souls and exist in myriad of realms, and within the earth realm shared by human beings, there are two kinds of beings: mobile and immobile. The mobile beings – which includes tiny insects, birds, aquatic life, animals and human beings – have two or more senses, while the immobile beings have only a single sense (ekenderiya). Among the single sense beings are plant beings, air beings (whirlwind (Note: For other examples from Uttaradhyayana Sutra text of Jainism, see Chapple.)), earth beings (clay), water beings (dew drop) and fire beings (burning coal, meteor, lightning). The last class of beings are Agni-bodies, and these are believed to contain soul and fire-bodied beings. Ahimsa, or non-violence, is the highest precept in Jainism. In their spiritual pursuits, Jain monks go to great lengths to practice Ahimsa; they neither start Agni nor extinguish Agni because doing so is considered violent to "fire beings" and an act that creates harmful Karma.

Agni-kumara or "fire princes" are a part of Jain theory of rebirth and a class of reincarnated beings. Agni or Tejas are terms used to describe substances and concepts that create beings, and in which transmigrating soul gets bound according to Jain theology.

== Ancient medicine and food ==
Agni, as constitutive principle of fire or heat, was incorporated in Hindu texts of ancient medicine such as the Charaka Samhita and Sushruta Samhita. It is, along with Soma, the two classification premises in the pre-4th century CE medical texts found in Hinduism and Buddhism. Agni-related category, states Dominik Wujastyk, included that of "hot, fiery, dry or parched" types, while Soma-related category included "moist, nourishing, soothing and cooling" types. This classification system was a basis of grouping medicinal herbs, seasons of the year, tastes and foods, empirical diagnosis of human illnesses, veterinary medicine, and many other aspects of health and lifestyle.

Agni was viewed as the life force in a healthy body, the power to digest foods, and innate in food. In Ayurveda, states Fleischman, "the amount of Agni determines the state of health".

Agni is an important entity in Ayurveda. Agni is the fiery metabolic energy of digestion, allows assimilation of food while ridding the body of waste and toxins, and transforms dense physical matter into subtle forms of energy the body needs. Jathara-agni determines the production of hydrochloric acid in the stomach, Bhuta-agni determines the production of bile in the liver, Kloma-agni determines the production of sugar-digesting pancreatic enzymes and so forth. The nature and quality of these agnis depend on one's dosha, which can be vata, pitta or kapha.

Agni is also known as Vaisvanara. Just as the illuminating power in the fire is a part of Agni's own effulgence, even so the heating power in the foods digestive and appetizing power is also a part of Agni's energy or potency.

== See also ==
- Agneya, Agni's daughter
- Atar, Zoroastrian yazata of fire
- Uchitta Bhagavathy, a regional Hindu goddess who is the companion of Agni
- Eternal flame
- Hestia, Greek goddess of the hearth
- Kamuy-huci, Ainu fire goddess
- Mātariśvan
- Vahagn, Armenian god of fire and war
- Vesta, Roman goddess of the hearth
