= Trishikhibrahmana Upanishad =

Sanskrit text, linked to Shukla Yajurveda

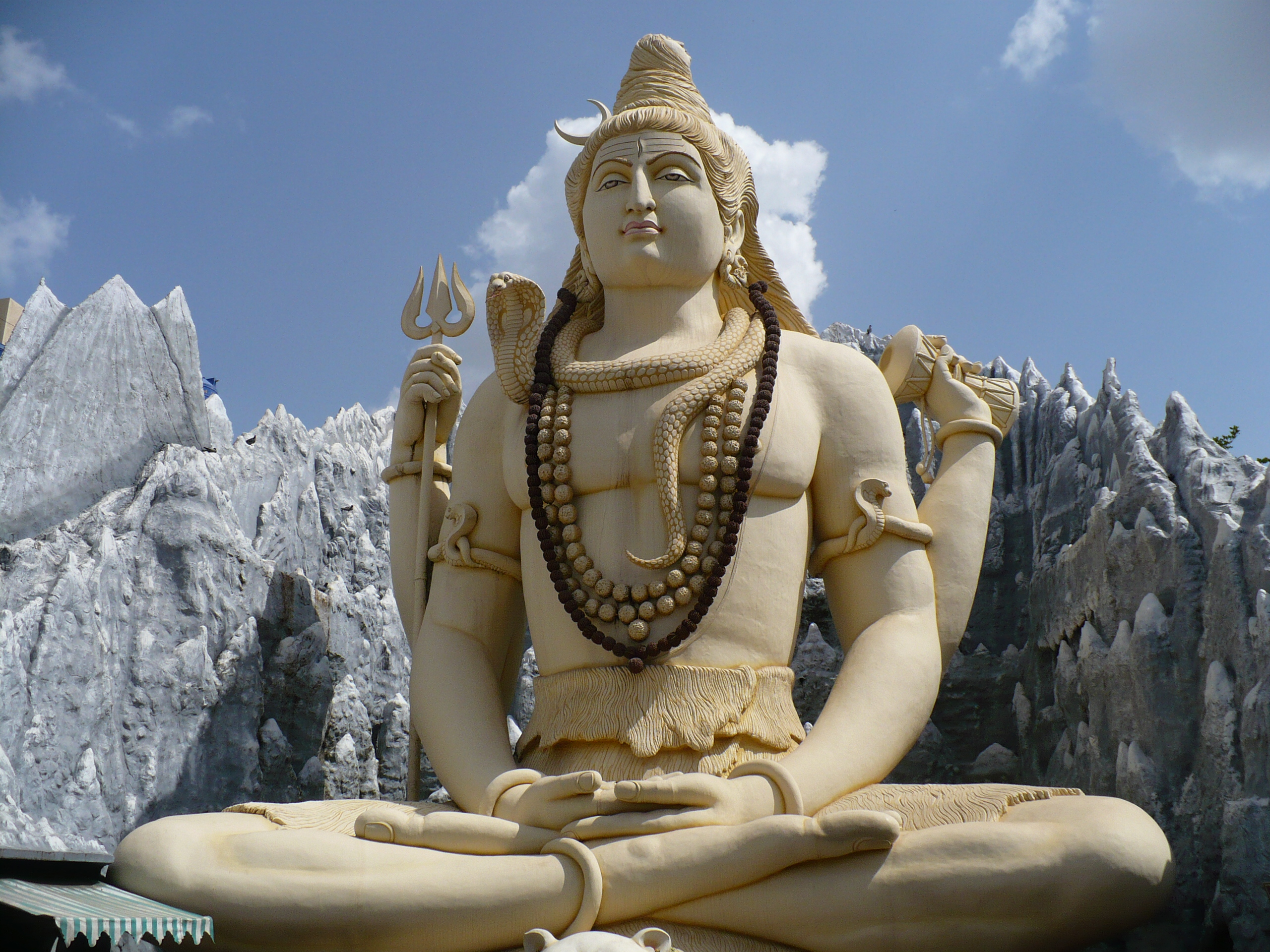
- Shiva is realizable with yoga, states the Upanishad.
- Devanagari: त्रिशिखब्राह्मण
- IAST: Triśikhi-brāhmaṇa
- Title means: Three-flamed or Trident Brahman
- Type: Yoga
- Linked Veda: Shukla Yajurveda
- Chapters: 2
- Verses: 164
- Philosophy: Yoga, Vedanta

The Trishikhibrahmana Upanishad (Sanskrit:त्रिशिखब्राह्मण उपनिषत्, IAST: Triśikhi-brāhmaṇa Upaniṣad), also known as Trisikhibrahmanopanisad, is one of the minor Upanishads of Hinduism and a Sanskrit text. It is attached to the Shukla Yajurveda and is classified as one of the 20 Yoga Upanishads.

The text discusses the non-relative nature of the metaphysical reality (Brahman), soul (Atman), and describes eight limb yoga as a means to self-knowledge. It explains its ideas through Shiva, but includes Vishnu. The text presents non-dualist Vedanta ideas through Yoga practice, with most of the Upanishad's discussion centered on Yoga.

== History ==
Gavin Flood dates this and other Yoga Upanishads to be probably from early 1st-millennium CE, but Raman states that it is probably a late Upanishad, composed after the 10th century, because parts of it reflect Hatha yoga traditions. Mikel Burley considers the text as part of the Hatha yoga literature, and states that the composition date of the text is uncertain. Alain Daniélou concurs with the uncertainty with dates when yoga texts were composed, but lists Trishikhibrahmana Upanishad as a Raja yoga text.

The Trishikhibrahmana Upanishad is listed at number 44 in the Telugu language anthology of 108 Upanishads of the Muktika canon, narrated by Rama to Hanuman.

== Contents ==
The quest

भगवन् किं देहः
किं प्राणः
किं कारण
किमात्मा स

O Lord! What is the body?
What is life?
What is the Prime Cause?
What is the Atman?

—Trishikhibrahmana Upanishad 1.1

The Trishikhibrahmana Upanishad is structured as two chapters with a cumulative total of 164 verses. The text opens with a set of four questions, for whose answers a yogi, the Trishikhi Brahmana, travels to the Sun. He asks, what is the body, what is soul, what is life, and what is the primal cause of the universe?

=== The primal cause ===
The text begins its answers by asserting in verse 2 that everything is Shiva, the absolute, the one being that appears to be divided into many beings and matter. The prime cause of the universe, states the Upanishad, is the Brahman, who once was indistinct nothingness (Avyakta). From this indistinct state emerged the Mahat (vast), asserts the text. From the Mahat emerged the self-conscious mind (Ahamkara) and the five subtle elements. From these emerged the gross elements, and from the gross elements emerged the empirical cosmos.

=== The body ===
The body is a combination of elements and organs, asserts Trishikhibrahmana Upanishad in verses 5 to 7. It is the inner senses in the body that yield knowledge, volition, decision and self-assertion. These, claims the text, include assimilation, digesting, breathing, seizing and lifting, as well as the perceptive faculties of sight (form), sound, smell, taste and touch. In verse 8, the Trisikhi text asserts that the human body is a house of all gods such as Agni, Indra, Upendra, Varuna and Prajapati. These each preside the essential functions in the body in the form of the 12 sensory and action organs.

=== Theory of life ===
The text, in chapter 2 verses 1–9, asserts that the empirical world is a combination of elements that evolves. It includes the inanimate and the animate beings. The beings are born through four means, through an egg, through seeds, through a womb, or through sweat. Their body is constituted from solids and the primary fluids. These are different from the inmost Atman (soul, self). The Atman, with its unending power, states the text, is exclusive bliss, transcendent and shines. In verses 10 to 14, the text states, everything is Shiva, that which changes is Shiva, and that which is not subject to change is also Shiva. Doubts arise in the Jiva (life force, doer) by agitation of the mind, states the text, and the Jiva (doer) is bound by karma. Renunciation of karma and associated misconceptions leads to peace, but this happens when the JIva is ready because he has reached the proper time and the right knowledge of the Atman, asserts the Trishikhibrahmana Upanishad.

=== Yoga ===
The Yamas

Ten are the Yamas:
Non-violence and truth,
Asteya and Brahmacharya,
Compassion and rectitude,
Forbearance and fortitude,
Moderation in food and cleanliness.

—Trishikhibrahmana Upanishad 2.32–33

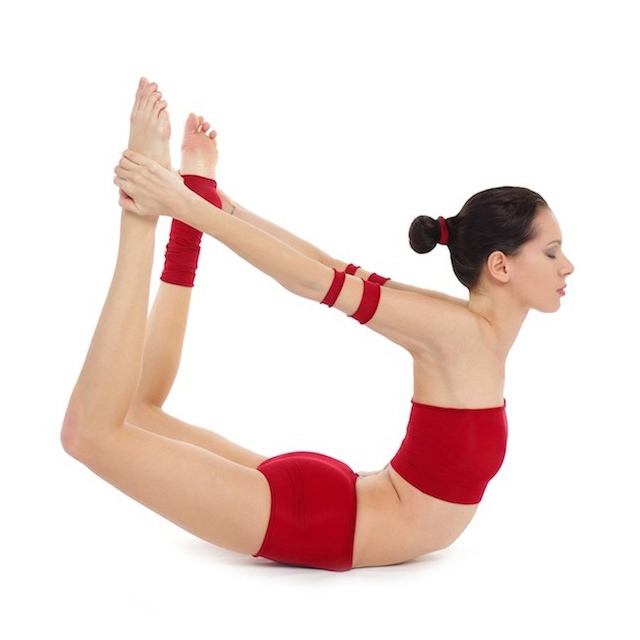
The text describes over a dozen asanas, including Dhanurasana (above).

In verses 15–23 of chapter 2, the Upanishad states that Yoga and Jnana (knowledge) is the way to know the Atman, the Shiva. Karma yoga, states the text, is observing the virtues and teachings in the Vedas, while Jnana yoga is the effort of applying one's mind to the understanding and realizing Moksha.

The text then defines the eight limbs of yoga. Yamas, states the Upanishad, are that which lead to detachment from being driven by the body, while Niyamas are that which lead to continuous attachment to the ultimate truth. The asana (posture) is that which yields stillness and passivity to all things. Pratyahara is that which empowers one to focus the mind inwards, while Dharana is that which stills the mind from jumping from one digressive thought to another. Dhyana, the text defines as the perfect reflection of self as absolute consciousness and "Soham", while Samadhi is when this too is dissolved within.

The Trishikhibrahmana Upanishad is notable for stating Vedantashravan (study of Vedanta) as one of ten Niyamas for a Yogi. The text is also notable for details it provides for various yoga asanas in verses 34–52 of chapter 2. In verses 53–89, the text presents its theories on kundalini yoga.

After presenting its theories on yoga asana and practice, the Upanishad proceeds to describe where to practice yoga and how to integrate the higher limbs of yoga. An ideal spot for yoga is a secluded and pleasant spot, state verses 2.89–90 of the text. The verses 2.94–2.119 present Pranayama, "extension of the prāṇa or breath", to cleanse the body through breathing exercises. After Pranayama, states the text, the Yogi should seek self-knowledge through Kaivalya (aloneness), wherein he meditates on his transcendent Atman (soul). This process, asserts the text, can be assisted by a yogi focusing his awareness to kundalini centers within his body. Alternatively, the text presents meditating on Vasudeva within, as the supreme, the transcendent Atman, with Vasudeva as one's own self.

The meditation on oneself, asserts the Trishikhibrahmana Upanishad, leads one to realize the Atman and to Vishnu. This is the knowledge of qualified Brahman (saguna), and from there the yogi should proceed to seeking the unqualified transcendental Brahman (nirguna). The Yogin realizes that "I alone am the transcendent Brahman, I am the Brahman". This is where he realizes his oneness with everyone, all of universe, where he no longer greeds, he is calm always, he is pure, and "like a lump of salt in water, dissolves into oneness with the universe". This is Nirvana, states the Upanishad.

== See also ==
- Pranagnihotra Upanishad
- Yoga (philosophy)
- Yogatattva Upanishad
- Yoga Vasistha
