= Uchitta Bhagavathy =

Hindu goddess

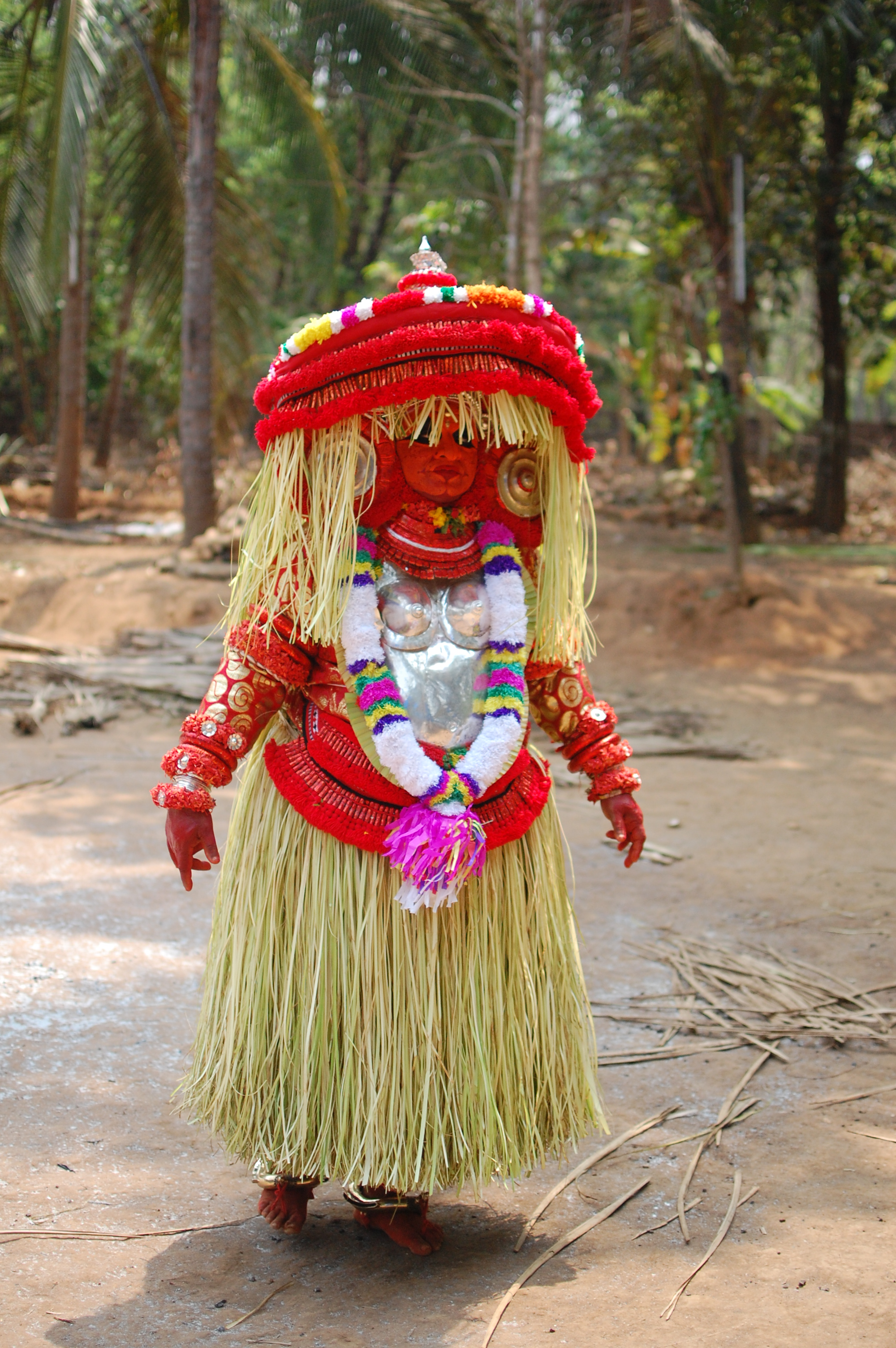
- Uchitta Theyyam
- Affiliation: Hinduism
- Region: North Malabar, Kerala, India

Uchitta Bhagavathy is a regional Hindu goddess worshipped in the North Malabar region in Kerala, India. Uchitta is worshiped and performed as Theyyam form. The main temples of this deity are spread over Kannur and Kasaragod districts in Kerala.

== Overview ==
Uchitta Bhagavathy is a regional Hindu goddess worshipped mainly in the Kannur and Kasaragod districts in Kerala. Uchitta is also known as Adiyeri madathil Uchitta Bhagavathy (meaning Uchitta Bhagavathy of Adiyeri matha) and Vadakkinakathachi. Uchitta Theyyam is performed mainly by the Malaya community of Kerala. Velar community also performs this theyyam.

Uchitta is a goddess much loved by women. Women pray to this goddess for a smooth delivery.

== Etymology ==
It is said that, the goddess got the name Uchitta since she speaks loudly (Uchathil in Malayalam).

== Myth ==
There are different legends behind the origin of each Theyyam. Different stories are in circulation about the origin of Uchitta also.

One belief is that Uchitta was the goddess who was about to be killed by Kamsa, instead of Krishna. It is said that, when Kamsa tried to kill her, she called out loudly that Kamsa's killer (Krishna) was born on earth.

Another legend says that Uchitta was born to Agni, the god of fire. An ember that fell from the body of Agni fell on the lotus which is the seat of the god Brahma and from it a beautiful goddess with divine lighted body was born and Brahma offered her to the god Shiva through the god Kamadeva and later on the request of the earth-goddess Bhumi she came to earth in the form of a human being for the maintenance of the world. It is also said that because she is the daughter of Agni, Uchitta theyyam lies on the fire and plays with the ember.

It is also believed that Uchitta is another form of Goddess Parvati. Another legend says that Uchitta is the daughter of Shiva.

== Theyyam ==
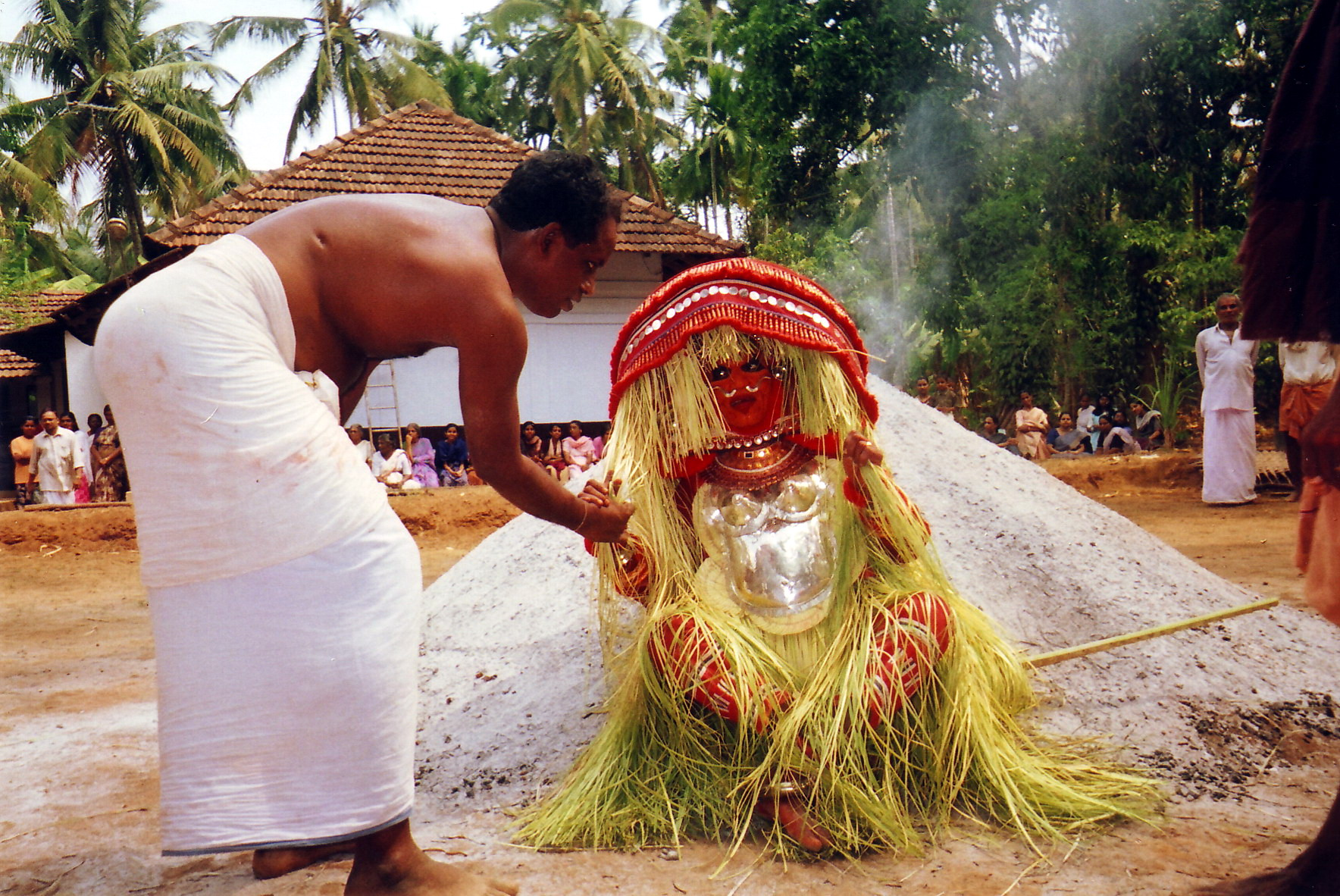
Uchitta Theyyam sitting on the ember

Being the daughter of Agni, the playful Uchitta Theyyam sits on fire, lies down and plays with embers.

Apart from the shrines of Uchitta, Uchitta Bhagavathi Theyyam is also performed as part of the Perumkaliyatta Mahotsavam (major theyyam festival) in many temples in North Malabar.
