= Jataveda =

Jataveda (Sanskrit: जातवेद, jātaveda) is a Vedic Sanskrit term for a particular form/epithet of Agni, the Vedic god of fire.

In a tradition originating in the late Vedic period, but already alluded to in the RigVeda, Agni has three forms: a celestial form (fire of the sun and the stars), an aerial form (lightning and the life-force of vegetation called the 'Child/Embryo of the Waters'), and a terrestrial form (e.g., the altar fire at worship). In this scheme, Jataveda (mass noun) represents the class of terrestrial fires (i.e. hearth fire, kiln fire, and so on), but in particular — as the Jataveda — representing Agni as the altar fire.

In that aspect as the altar fire, Agni-Jataveda was perceived to be the means through which his worshippers were to gain knowledge/wisdom/understanding (veda) of all existence (jata). In an extended sense, the altar fire/Agni-Jataveda was then also perceived to be the hypostasis of the inspiration that engendered the Vedas themselves.

This exact sense of word appears to have been lost very early, and there are numerous speculations on the nature of the Jatavedas in the commentaries of the late Vedas and the Brahmanas. The word is explained five ways: (1) Knowing all created beings; (2) Possessing all creatures or everything existent; (3) Known by created beings; (4) Possessing vedas, riches; (5.) Possessing vedas, wisdom. Even more derivations and explanations are found in the Brahmanas.

In post-Vedic literature, the term is also used as an epithet of Shiva.

Agni is frequently called Jataveda in the Sri Suktam, which requests him to invoke Lakshmi into himself.

According to Brahma puran, Jataveda is the brother of Agni who used to deliver havishya (offerings to Yajna). He was killed by Madhu, son of Diti, due to which he himself was posted as the new Jataveda by Devas and Rishis.
