= Pranagnihotra Upanishad =

Minor Upanishad of Hinduism

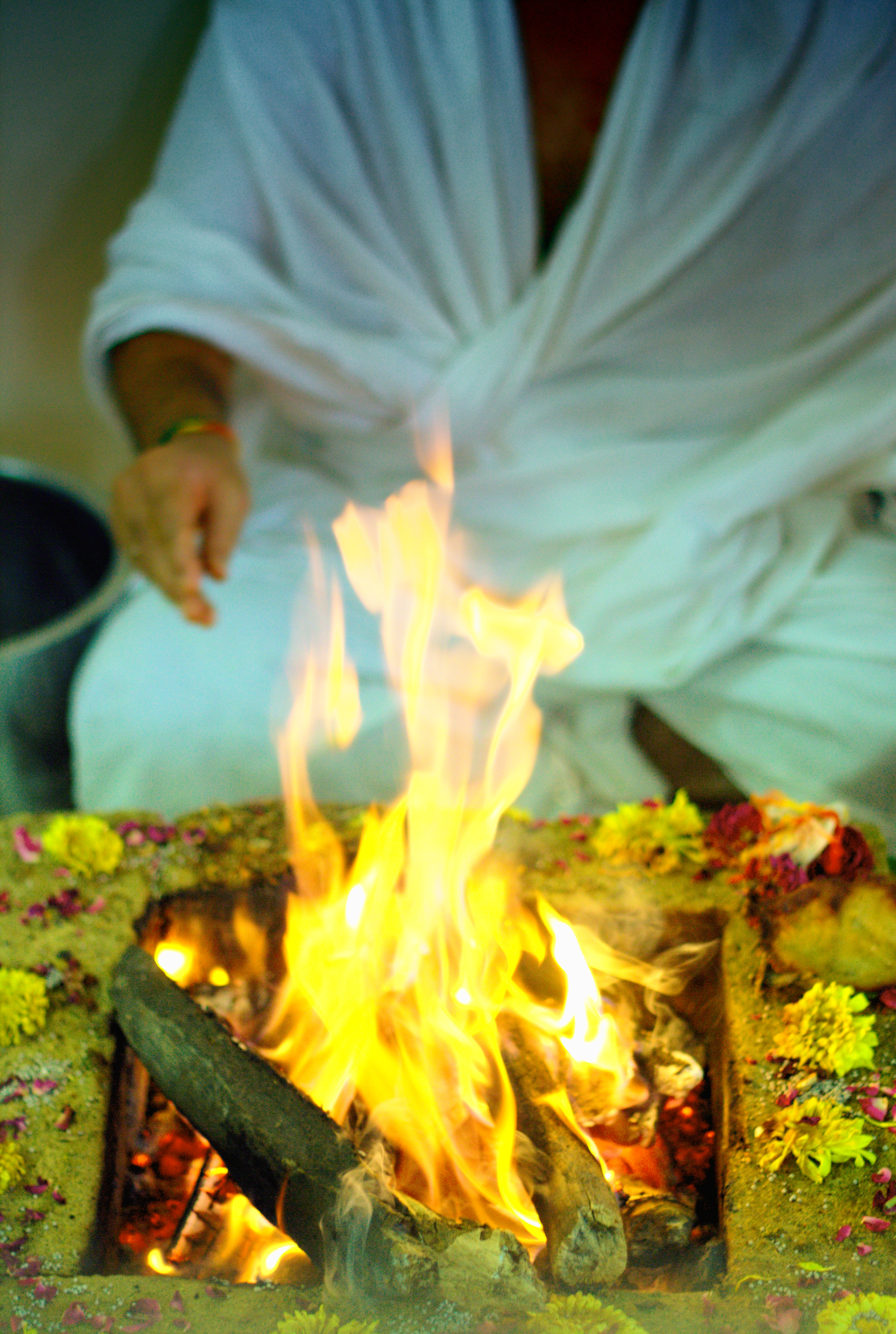
- An agnihotra (above) is a fire sacrifice to external gods, a pranagnihotra is an equivalent to the gods in human body.
- Devanagari: प्राणाग्निहोत्र
- Title means: The fire offering made to the Prana
- Linked Veda: Atharvaveda
- Verses: 23
- Philosophy: Vedanta

The Pranagnihotra Upanishad (Sanskrit: प्राणाग्निहोत्र उपनिषत्, IAST:Pranagnihotra Upaniṣad) is a minor Upanishad of Hinduism. In the anthology of 108 Upanishads of the Muktika canon, narrated by Rama to Hanuman, it is listed at number 94. The Sanskrit text is one of the 22 Samanya Upanishads, part of the Vedanta school of Hindu philosophy literature and is attached to the Atharva Veda. The Upanishad comprises 23 verses.

The Pranagnihotra Upanishad's title literally means Hotra (sacrifice) offered to the Agni (fire) of Prana (breath, life force)." The text asserts that universal soul (God) is within one self, all Vedic gods are embodied in the human body giving one various abilities, eating is allegorically a sacrifice to the gastric fire, and life is a ceremony to the God within.

The Upanishad suggests that even if one does not perform external rituals such as the Vedic Agnihotra and one lacks the knowledge of Samkhya or Yoga philosophy, one can nevertheless achieve moksha (liberation, freedom) by realizing that the God is within one's body, and the universal soul in the individual self represents the all pervading Brahman. This realization makes a person sail through all suffering and vicissitudes of life. The Upanishad in its final passages states that virtuous duty of non-violence, compassion, patience and memory unto others is an act of worship to the God within. It concludes by re-asserting that "all the gods are enclosed in this body here".

The text is also known as Pranagnihotropanishad (Sanskrit: प्राणाग्निहोत्रोपनिषत्).

== Etymology ==
Pranagnihotra is a compound Sanskrit word, composed of Prana (soul-life force, breath of life, vital breath and energy), Agni (fire) and Hotra (oblation, sacrifice). The title of the text, states Paul Deussen, means the Upanishad of "fire offering made to the Prana" (life force), or the "sacrifice offered in the Prana-fire."

The term Pranagnihotra (or prana agnihotra) appears in many ancient Sanskrit texts, and has been generally interpreted in two ways, states Bodewitz. First, as "the fire-sacrifice to the breaths"; and second, as "the sacrifice in the fires which are the breaths". In the context of the Pranagnihotra Upanishad, the allegory focuses on treating human body as a temple and individual self (soul) as identical with the universal soul (Brahman).

== Anthology ==
The Pranagnihotra Upanishad text is also listed in at sr no. 17 in the list of 30 minor Upanishads in the Bibliothica Indica of Professor Ramamaya Tarkaratna with Narayanabhatta's commentary.

In Colebrooke anthology of 52 Upanishads popular in north India, the text is listed at number 11. The Narayana anthology also includes this Upanishad at number 11. It finds mention in the anthology of Upanishads popular in South India.

== Foundation and structure ==
The Pranagnihotra Upanishad, states Paul Deussen, builds upon the foundation presented in the ancient Principal Upanishads wherein the soul within the individual is identified with all-encompassing universal soul, and various old Vedic nature gods are envisioned to be aspects of human body, sensory organs and powers of abstraction. In Pranagnihotra, the internal gods replace the external gods of Agnihotra.

The text adopts the ideas from the more ancient texts such as the Chandogya Upanishad of human body as the holistic city where Brahman (universal soul) resides, where Surya (sun deity) is envisioned as eyes to see light, Vayu (wind deity) as nose for breathing air, Indra as hands, Vishnu as legs, Kama or Prajapati as sexual organs, and other organs work together with Atman. It then maps the external yajna sacrifice of worldly rituals such as Agnihotram offered to Vedic gods, to internal introspection and offerings to one's own body. The purification rituals of a yajna, for example states the text, are same as washing one's hands and rinsing one's mouth before and after eating.

The idea that public rituals and sacrifice to gods in nature are equivalent to personal rituals and offerings to gods within oneself, is already present in section 1.5 of Brihadaranyaka Upanishad and chapter 5 of Chandogya Upanishad, two of the oldest Upanishads of Hinduism. The Pranagnihotra Upanishad proceeds to map, in its four parts, all inner aspects of human body and human life to the outer observed aspects of a public ritual, including calling all of the external world as witness and attendants to the ceremony of human life just like a public ritual has witnesses and attendants.

The premise behind the second part of the Pranagnihotra Upanishad is, states Deussen, in Maitri Upanishad chapter 6, while Chandogya Upanishad and Mahanarayana Upanishad are at the foundation of its part three and four. Part three is structured as a set of questions, and part four as answers to these questions. In this part of the Upanishad, human intellect is envisioned as one's inner wife, mind as the chariot, and one's soul to be the God within. The text states that in the inner ritual of worship, virtues towards others is an act of worship to one's inner wife (Patni-samyajas) and the God within, and that the four most important virtues are: non-violence (Ahimsa), compassion, patience and memory. The text, notes Deussen, mentions Ahimsa twice, once as Samyajas (virtuous duty and offering) and another as Iṣṭis (desired object).

== Contents ==
Human body as temple for sacrificial offerings (according to Pranagnihotra Upanishad)
Feature	Agnihotra fire ritual	Pranagnihotra equivalent
Sacrificer	Devotee	Self
Co-sacrificer	Devotee's wife	Intellect as inner wife
Hymns and knowledge	Officiating priests	Self-study of Vedas
Priest	Adhvaryu	Ego
Initiating priest	Hotri	Mind
Chief priest	Ritvij	Prana
Singer	Udgatri (Chanter)	Throat and mouth (speech)
Altar	Yajna	One's body
Offering	Ghee	Eyes and ears
Supplements	Secondary offerings	Gunas (personality)
Assistants	Brahmins	Tanmantras (sensory feelings)
Attendants	People	Nature and elements
Sacrifice recipient	Fire	Teeth, tongue, stomach
Sound	Sacrificial post	Om
Oblations	Ajya	Compassion, patience, non-violence, memory
Carrier	Chariot	Mind
Reward	Benedictions	Renunciation, Moksha
Conclusion	Bathe	Death

The first verse of Part 1 of the Pranagnihotra Upanishad states the objective of the text as follows,

Now, therefore, let us explain the sacrifice offered in one's own body, which forms the essence of all the Upanishads, which is helpful for the knowledge of Samsara, which is studied, and which has food as its authority.

— Pranagnihotra Upanishad 1.1, Translated by Paul Deussen

The rest of the text presents its thesis.

=== Part 1 ===
In the first part, the Upanishad opens its thesis with the declaration that liberation (freedom) is possible without the ritual of Agnihotra, the knowledge of Samkhya and Yoga philosophies. In the first seven verses the Upanishad defines "the hymn of food" as a feeding ceremony, after perceiving food as integral to one's body, and invokes the Vedic gods; sun denoting eyes, vayu or wind personifying breath and so forth. This offering is made to prana, meaning life-force, which satiates the needs of the sensory organs with the related internal gods also satisfied. After placing the food on the ground as per a set procedure, three mantras are recited invoking Brihaspati and Soma (Moon) to protect us (all living beings) from fear, to protect them from evil spirits, to give food that is wholesome and rich in energy and give progeny to all bipeds and quadrupeds. The verse 8 states the unity of Atman (individual soul) and Brahman (universal soul) as follows,

You (Atman) abide within the beings, in the cavity of heart and everywhere,
You are the sacrifice, are Brahman, are Rudra, are Vishnu, are the exclamation Vasat,
Water, light, essence, the immortal,
Brahman, Bhur, Bhuvah, Svar, Om, Salutation!

— Pranagnihotra Upanishad 1.8, Translated by Paul Deussen

In verses 9, 10, and 11 the Upanishad states the sanctity of water in purifying everything on the earth, requesting that she (goddess of water) purify the one offering the prayer of food. The Upanishad declares that water is ambrosia. The verses offer the benediction that may she purify "whatever uneatable I eat without knowing, whatever misdeeds I did without knowing, may she nourish the life-force".

With the water accepting and purifying whatever is offered to it, then oblation is offered reciting Om to the five fires in the body, with the prayer that "may myself be in the Brahman" in verse 10 of the Upanishad. The five fires, the text states are Prana (fire of breath, intake, life-force), Apana (fire of elimination, outtake, removal of waste products from the body), Vyana (fire of circulating energy), Samana (fire of assimilation), and Udana (fire of sound, speech, ascending consciousness).

Verses 11 and 12 are a juhoti (offering) with open hand to self, where each of five fingers are mapped to the five fires, with a hand gesture made with the use of tips of fingers and the thumb of the right hand. The first offering as svaha is to prana by holding the little finger or Kanishtika and the thumb together; the second offering is with the ring finger or anamika and the thumb held together to Apana; with the middle finger and the thumb held together to Vyana; with all fingers together to Udana; and with the forefinger and thumb together to Samana.

The offerings are made as stated in the Upanishad once to prana (the sun, head), twice to apana (the mouth), once to dakhsinagni (the southern fire, heart), once to the garhapatya (family fire, navel), and once to pryashchitta (for repentance, below navel) fire. The person, states Deussen, then rinses his mouth with water, and murmurs, "the highest Atman gives peace to all the creatures! I shall not be born any more! You are all, all-human, multiform! You sustain the universe born out of you."

=== Part 2 ===
In Part 2, the Upanishad asserts that while one is offering purifying water as oblation to self, one must, states Deussen, meditate on Atman (one's soul) and think, "I make him a fire-sacrifice, because he is a foster-child of all" and "may all sacrificial offerings fuse into you (soul)", equating it to be the "immortal Brahman (universal soul, God)", and asserting it to be present in everyone.

The text remarks in verses 16–17 that eating and circulation of food within the temple of body is yajna, a homa sacrifice in circulation.

In verses 18 to 20, the Pranagnihotra Upanishad maps the five external fires into internal fires, asserting them to be sun fire in the Ekarsi of head, optic fire or the Ahavaniya-fire of mouth, gastric fire overseen by heart, intestinal fire that cooks and digests in the navel, and all atonement fire in the body below the navel that is threefold – two of which remove waste and one which procreates by means of moon-light.

=== Part 3 ===
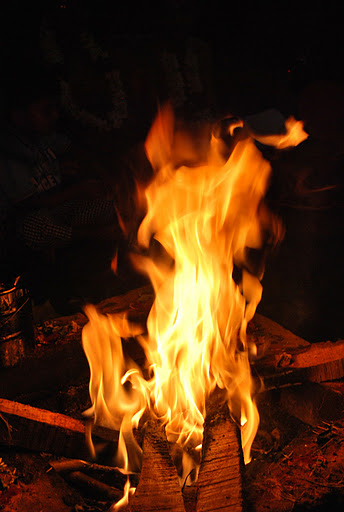
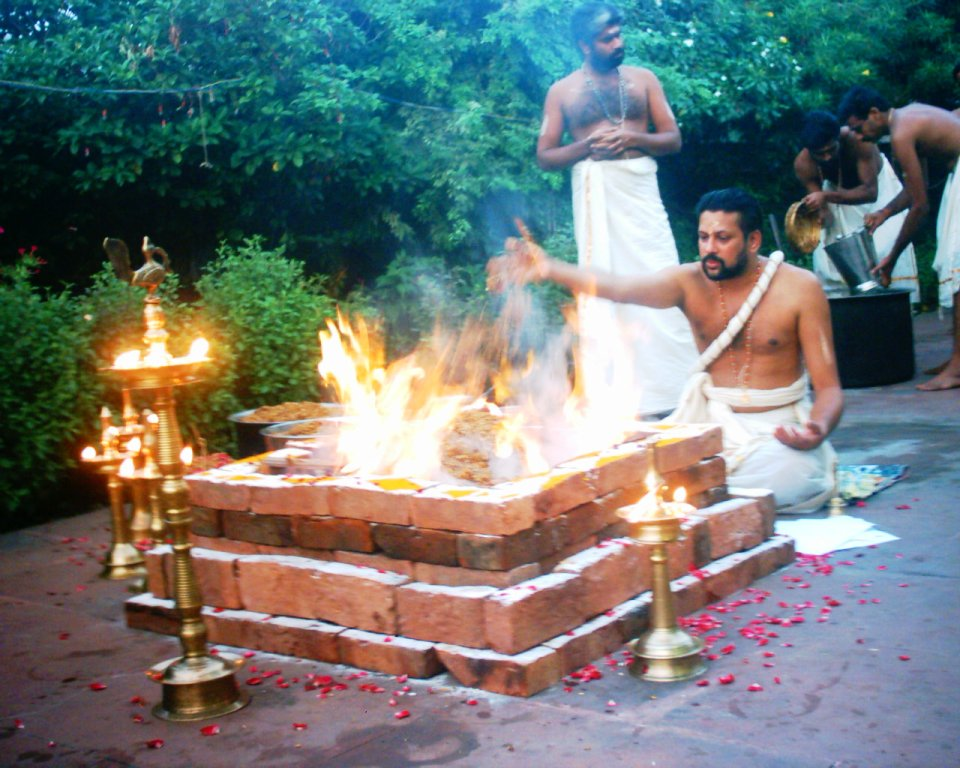
Fire for Agnihotra-style Yajna sacrifice ritual

Part 3 consists of one verse, the verse 21, which is a long series of questions. It asks, that in this sacrifice offered inside one's body, who is the sacrificer?, who is his wife?, who is the Ritvij (chief priest)?, other priests?, assistants?, what is the utensil?, Ida (milk offering)?, which are the hymns? what is the altar? what is the reward? how does it conclude? among many other questions.

=== Part 4 ===
Part 4 consists of two verses, with verse 22 answering the questions in Part 3 (see table mapping the features of agnihotra with equivalent aspect in a pranagnihotra). The significant answers include the assertion that virtuous duty of non-violence, compassion, patience and memory unto others is an act of worship of one's soul (God within).

In the last, 23rd verse, the Upanishad states,

All the godheads, indeed, there are
enclosed in this body here!

— Pranagnihotra Upanishad 4.23, Translated by Paul Deussen

The verse 23 then adds that liberation from samsara comes to one who dies in Benares (Varanasi), and one who reads this Upanishad.

== Significance and relation to other Hindu texts ==
The Pranagnihotra is, states Bodewitz, an internalized direct private ritual that substituted external social public Agnihotra ritual. The idea of Pranagnihotra duty to oneself as a substitute for a social ritual are rooted in Vedic texts, and Pranagnihotra rites are found in post-Vedic texts such as Grihyasutras, and in various Dharmashastras.

The idea of gods (Deva) referring to the sense organs within one's body found in Pranagnihotra Upanishad, similarly, has ancient roots. It is found in Brihadaranyaka Upanishad section 2.2, Kaushitaki Upanishad sections 1.4 and 2.1–2.5, Prasna Upanishad chapter 2, and others. The idea is also found and developed by other minor Upanishads such as the Brahma Upanishad which opens by describing human body as the "divine city of Brahman (universal soul)".

Bodewitz states that the development of pranagnihotra is significant as it reflects the stage in ancient Indian thought where "the self or the person as a totality became central, with the self or soul as the manifestation of the highest principle or god". This evolution marked a shift in spiritual rite from the external to the internal, from public performance to performance in thought, from gods in nature to gods within, and this shift accompanied a shift in the focus of philosophies as well as methods of Puja. Klaus Witz states that the specific details of pranagnihotra offers an introduction to water rituals and mouth rinsing observed among some Hindus before a meal.

Heesterman describes the pranagnihotra sacrifice significance to be that the practitioner performs the sacrifice with food without any outside help or reciprocity, and this ritual allows the Hindu to "stay in the society while maintaining his independence from it", its simplicity thus marks the "end station of Vedic ritualism". It urges man, states Heesterman, to "emancipate himself from the mundane bonds and to realize the transcendent exclusively by himself and in himself".

== See also ==
- Vedas
- Samsara
- Moksha

== Bibliography ==
- Deussen, Paul; Bedekar, V.M.; Palsule, G.B. (1 January 1997). Sixty Upanishads of the Veda. Motilal Banarsidass. ISBN 978-81-208-1467-7.
- Muller, Max (1962). The Upanishads. Oxford University Press (Reprinted: Courier). ISBN 978-0486209937.
- Nair, Shantha N. (2008). Echoes of Ancient Indian Wisdom. Pustak Mahal. ISBN 978-81-223-1020-7.
