= Vaishnavism =

Major Hindu tradition

- Vaishnava traditions centre on god Vishnu (center), depicted in a 1000 AD Sculpture.

Vaishnavism (Sanskrit: वैष्णवसम्प्रदायः, romanised: Vaiṣṇavasampradāyaḥ), also called Vishnuism, is one of the major Hindu religious traditions, that considers Vishnu as the supreme being leading all other Hindu deities, that is, Mahavishnu. It is one of the major Hindu denominations along with Shaivism, Shaktism, and Smartism. Its followers are called Vaishnavites or Vaishnavas (IAST: Vaiṣṇava), and it includes sub-sects like Krishnaism and Ramaism, which consider Krishna and Rama as the supreme beings respectively.

The ancient emergence of Vaishnavism is unclear, and broadly hypothesised as the rise of various regional non-Vedic religions which fused with one another and with worship of Vishnu. Those popular non-Vedic theistic traditions, particularly the Bhagavata cults of Vāsudeva-Krishna and Gopala-Krishna, as well as the Pancaratra-cult of Narayana, developed in the 7th to 4th century BCE, and were identified with the Vedic God Vishnu in the early centuries CE, and finalised as Vaishnavism, when it developed the avatar doctrine, wherein the various non-Vedic deities are revered as distinct incarnations of the supreme God Vishnu. Narayana, Hari, Rama, Krishna, Kalki, Perumal, Shrinathji, Vithoba, Venkateswara, Guruvayurappan, Ranganatha, Jagannath, Badrinath and Muktinath are revered as forms or avatars of Vishnu, all seen as different aspects of the same supreme being.

The Vaishnavite tradition is known for the loving devotion to an avatar of Vishnu (often Krishna), and as such was key to the spread of the Bhakti movement in the Indian subcontinent in the 2nd millennium CE. It has four Vedanta - schools of numerous denominations (sampradaya): the medieval-era Vishishtadvaita school of Ramanuja, the Dvaita school of Madhvacharya, the Dvaitadvaita school of Nimbarkacharya, and the Shuddhadvaita of Vallabhacharya. There are also several other Vishnu-traditions. Ramananda (14th century) created a Rama-oriented movement, now the largest monastic group in Asia.

Key texts in Vaishnavism include the Vedas, the Upanishads, the Bhagavad Gita, the Pancharatra (Agama) texts, Naalayira Divya Prabhandham, and the Bhagavata Purana.

According to a 2020 estimate by The World Religion Database (WRD), hosted at Boston University's Institute on Culture, Religion and World Affairs (CURA), Vaishnavism is the largest Hindu sect, constituting about 399 million Hindus.

== History ==
=== Origins ===
==== Northern India ====
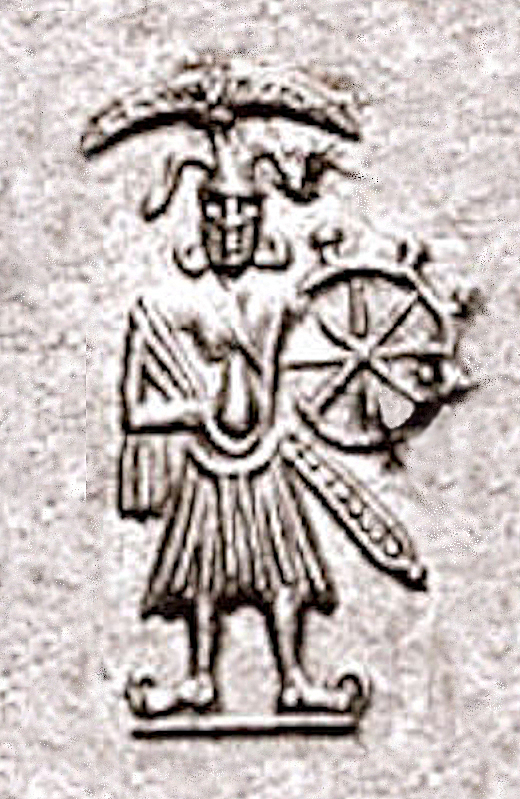
Vāsudeva on a coin of Agathocles of Bactria, circa 190–180 BCE. This is "the earliest unambiguous image" of the deity.

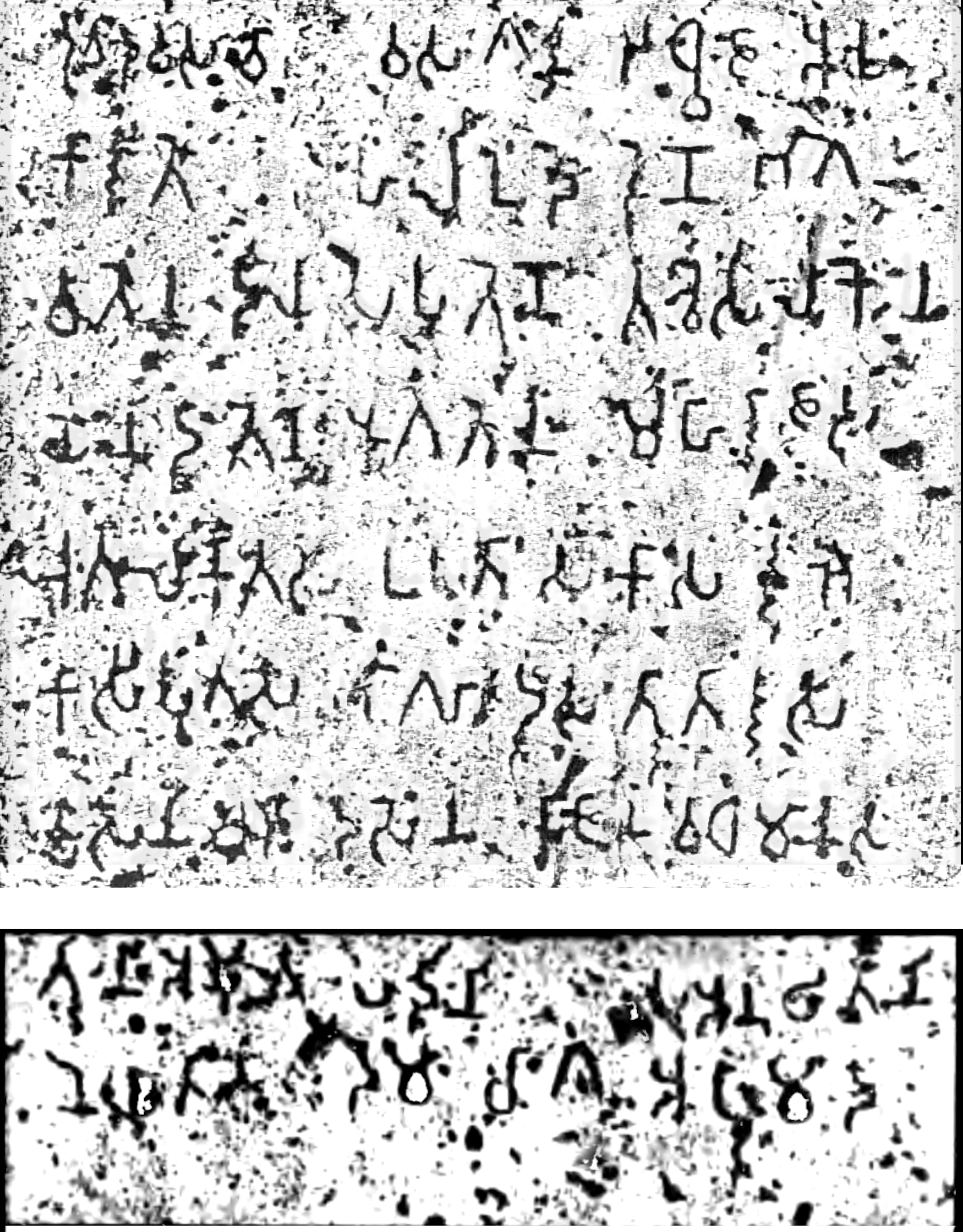
The inscription of the Heliodorus pillar that was made by Indo-Greek envoy Heliodorus in 110 BCE, in what is modern Vidisha (Madhya Pradesh). The inscription states Heliodorus is a Bhagavata devoted to the "God of gods" Vāsudeva.

The ancient emergence of Vaishnavism is unclear, with evidence inconsistent and scanty. In the Rig Veda Vishnu is "a benevolent, solar deity," who is mentioned in just a few hymns, and rose to prominence mid-first century BCE. (Note: This rise to prominence had been related by older publications to various hymns of the Rig Veda, such as 1.154.5, 1.56.3 and 10.15.3, which state that Vishnu resides in the paramam pada ("highest place"), which is "seen by the wise." This "highest place" came to be interpretated as the Atman's (Self) final goal after death, as reflected in the Katha Upanishad. Yet, according to Jan Gonda, this interpretation is insufficient to explain the ascendance of Vishnu in post-Vedic times. For the Rg Vedic verses in question, see: * Rg Veda 1.22.20: www.wisdomlib.org (27 August 2021). "Rig Veda 1.22.20 [English translation]". www.wisdomlib.org. * Rg Veda 1.22.21www.wisdomlib.org (27 August 2021). "Rig Veda 1.22.21 [English translation]". www.wisdomlib.org. * Rg Veda 1.154.6: www.wisdomlib.org (27 August 2021). "Rig Veda 1.154.1 [English translation]". www.wisdomlib.org. Bhandarkar (1913, pp. 33) relates this elevation also to Vishnu's 'third step: "The long strides which he takes, and the three steps by which he measures the universe, are always described with an enthusiastic spirit. His first two steps can be discerned and approached by men, but the third no one can dare transgress, and it is beyond the flight of birds (RV. I. 155) 5)." See also Vishnu#Vedas.) Syncretism of various local traditions and deities (Vasudeva-Krishna, Narayana, Krishna-Gopala) with Vishnu resulted in Vaishnavism.

According to Bhandarkar, Vaishnavism formed in the Purnaic period through the identification of Vishnu with Narayana and with Vasudeva-Krishna, following his elevation as the "Supreme Spirit". He suggests that this elevation appears linked to reverence for Vishnu's "third step" or for his "highest place" (paramam pada), described in the Rig Veda as being "seen by the wise" and later reinterpreted in Katha Upanishad as the soul's final goal. Yet, according to Jan Gonda, this interpretation is insufficient to explain the ascendance of Vishnu in post-Vedic times. Gonda argues that the Vedic poets did not give a complete description of his qualities, and that he may have had a greater appeal among the Aryan and non-Aryan "masses" of the early Vedic times than reflected in the Vedas. Gonda concludes that, for the Vedic people, the complex powers which were experienced as "the presence and the activity of a divine personality called Visnu may be the best described as the 'idea' of universal penetration or pervasiveness, as the axis mundi and otherwise, of the omnipresence of a mighty and beneficent energy, in which all beings abide".

According to Dandekar, what is understood today as Vaishnavism did not originate in Vedism, but emerged from the merger of several popular theistic traditions after the decline of Brahmanism at the end of the Vedic period, shortly before the second urbanisation of northern India, in the 7th to 4th century BCE. (Note: Dandekar 1987, p. 9499: "The origin of Vaiṣṇavism as a theistic sect can by no means be traced back to the Ṛgvedic god Viṣṇu. In fact, Vaiṣṇavism is in no sense Vedic in origin. (...) Strangely, the available evidence shows that the worship of Vāsudeva, and not that of Viṣṇu, marks the beginning of what we today understand by Vaiṣṇavism. This Vāsudevism, which represents the earliest known phase of Vaiṣṇavism, must already have become stabilized in the days of Pāṇini (Seventh to fifth centuries bce).")

According to Dandekar, Vaishnavism initially formed as Vasudevism around Vāsudeva, a deified leader of the Vrishnis, and one of the Vrishni heroes. Later, Vāsudeva was amalgamated with Krishna "the deified tribal hero and religious leader of the Yadavas", to form the merged deity Bhagavan Vāsudeva-Krishna, due to the close relation between the tribes of the Vrishnis and the Yadavas. This was followed by a merger with the cult of Gopala-Krishna of the cowherd community of the Abhıras in the 4th century CE. The character of Gopala Krishna is often considered to be non-Vedic. According to Dandekar, such mergers positioned Krishnaism between the heterodox sramana movement and the orthodox Vedic religion. The "Greater Krsnaism", states Dandekar, then adopted the Rigvedic Vishnu as Supreme deity to appeal to orthodox elements.

According to Klostermaier, Vaishnavism originates in the last centuries BCE and the early centuries CE, with the cult of the heroic Vāsudeva, a leading member of the Vrishni heroes, which was then later amalgamated with Krishna, hero of the Yadavas, and still several centuries later with the "divine child" Bala Krishna of the Gopala traditions. (Note: Klostermaier: "Present day Krishna worship is an amalgam of various elements. According to historical testimonies Krishna-Vasudeva worship already flourished in and around Mathura several centuries before Christ. Next came the sect of Krishna Govinda. Later the worship of Bala-Krishna, the Divine Child Krishna was added — a quite prominent feature of modern Krishnaism. The last element seems to have been Krishna Gopijanavallabha, Krishna the lover of the Gopis, among whom Radha occupies a special position. In some books Krishna is presented as the founder and first teacher of the Bhagavata religion.") According to Klostermaier, "In some books Krishna is presented as the founder and first teacher of the Bhagavata religion." According to Dalal, "The term Bhagavata seems to have developed from the concept of the Vedic deity Bhaga, and initially it seems to have been a monotheistic sect, independent of the Brahmanical pantheon."

The development of the Krishna-traditions was followed by a syncretism of these non-Vedic traditions with the Mahabharata canon, thus affiliating itself with Vedism in order to become acceptable to the orthodox establishment. The Vishnu of the Rig Veda was assimilated into non-Vedic Krishnaism and became the equivalent of the Supreme God. The appearance of Krishna as one of the Avatars of Vishnu dates to the period of the Sanskrit epics in the early centuries CE. The Bhagavad Gita - initially, a Krishnaite scripture, according to Friedhelm Hardy - was incorporated into the Mahabharata as a key text of Krishnaism.

Finally, the Narayana worshippers were also included, which further brahmanized Vaishnavism. The Nara-Narayana worshippers may have originated in Badari, a northern ridge of the Hindu Kush, and was absorbed into the Vedic orthodoxy as Purusa Narayana. Purusa Narayana may have later been turned into Arjuna and Krsna.

In the late Vedic texts (~1000 to 500 BCE), the concept of a metaphysical Brahman grew in prominence. The Vaishnavism tradition considered Vishnu to be identical to Brahman, just like Shaivism and Shaktism consider Shiva and Devi to be Brahman respectively.

This complex history is reflected in the two main early denominations of Vaishnavism: the Bhagavats, worshipping Vāsudeva-Krishna and follow Brahmanic Vaishnavism, and the Panchratris, who regarded Narayana as their founder and follow the Tantric Vaishnavism.

==== Southern India ====
S. Krishnaswami Aiyangar states that the Vaishnava Alvars lived in the first half of the 12th century with their works flourishing about the time of the revival of Brahminism and Hinduism in the north and speculates that Vaishnavism might have spread to the south as early as the first century CE. Secular literature also ascribes the tradition in the south to the 3rd century CE. U. V. Swaminatha Iyer, a scholar of Tamil literature, published the Paripatal (Sangam period), which contains seven poems in praise of Vishnu, including references to Krishna and Balarama. Aiyangar notes an invasion of the south by the Mauryas in some of the older poems of the Sangam, suggesting that opposition to northern conquest may have an element of religion, with orthodox Brahmanism resisting the spread of Buddhism under Ashoka. Tamil literature of this period also records the settlement of Brahman colonies in the south, and exhibit considerable Brahmanical influence.

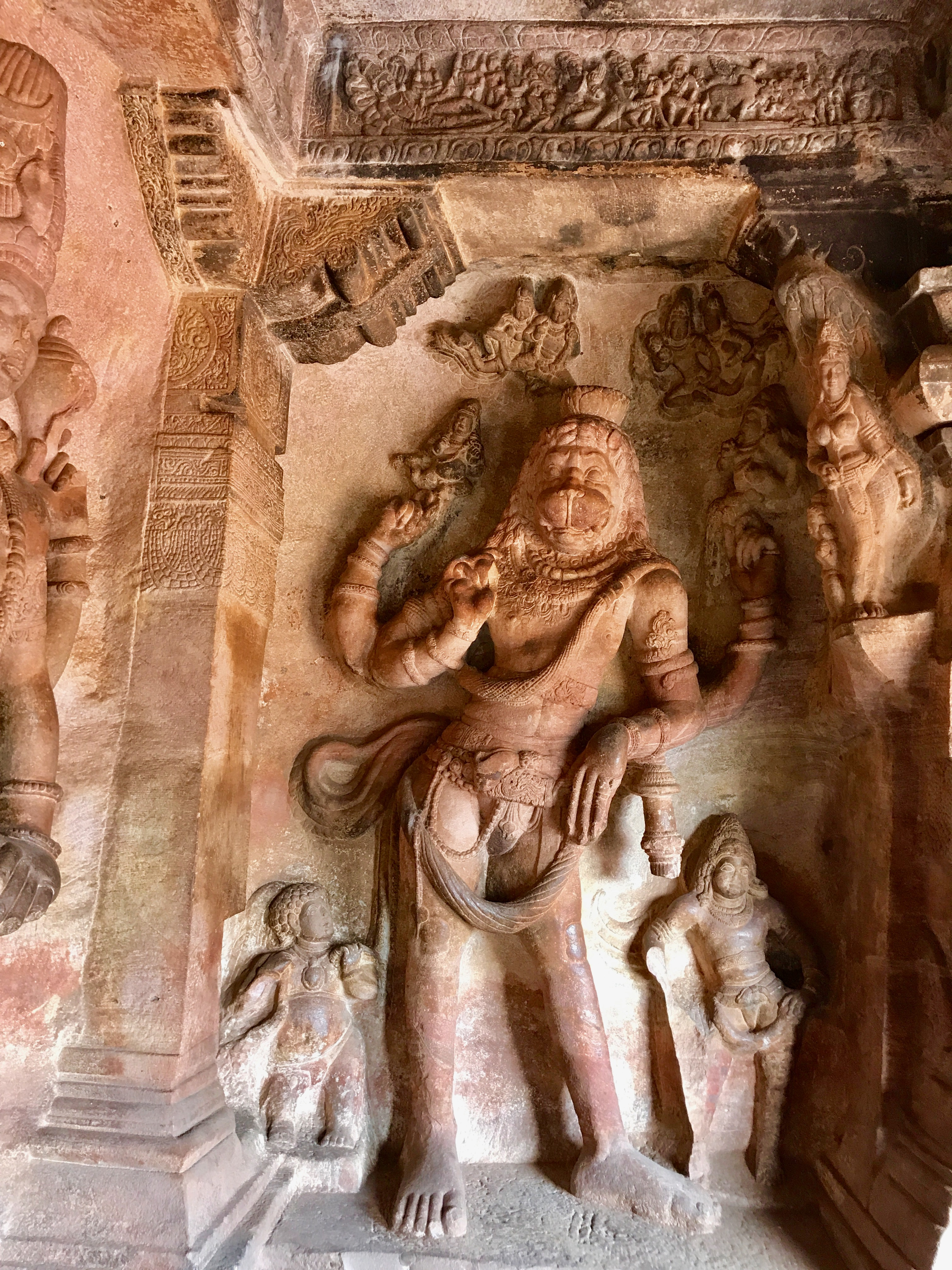
A 6th century sculpture of Narasimha at the Badami cave temple, constructed by the Chalukyas

The Pallava dynasty of Tamilakam patronised Vaishnavism. Mahendra Varman built shrines both of Vishnu and Shiva, several of his cave-temples exhibiting shrines to Brahma, Vishnu, and Shiva. In the age of the Pallava domination, which followed immediately, both Vaishnavism and Shaivism flourished, fighting the insurgent Buddhists and Jains. The Pallavas were also the first of various dynasties that offered land and wealth to the Venkatesvara temple at Tirumala, which would soon become the most revered religious site of South India. The Sri Vaishnava acharya Ramanuja is credited with the conversion of the Hoysala king Vishnuvardhana (originally called Bittideva) from Jainism to Vaishnavism, consolidating the faith in Karnataka. The Chalukyas and their rivals of the Pallavas appear to have employed Vaishnavism as an assertion of divine kingship, one of them proclaiming themselves as terrestrial emanations of Vishnu while the other promptly adopted Shaivism as their favoured tradition, neither of them offering much importance to the other's deity. The Sri Vaishnava sampradaya of Ramanuja would hold sway in the south, the Vadakalai denomination subscribing to Vedanta philosophy and the Tenkalai adhering to regional liturgies known as Prabandham.

According to Hardy, (Note: Friedhelm Hardy in his "Viraha-bhakti" analyses the history of Krishnaism, specifically all pre-11th-century sources starting with the stories of Krishna and the gopi, and Mayon mysticism of the Vaishnava Tamil saints, Sangam Tamil literature and Alvars' Krishna-centred devotion in the rasa of the emotional union and the dating and history of the Bhagavata Purana.) there is evidence of early "southern Krishnaism", despite the tendency to allocate the Krishna-traditions to the Northern traditions. South Indian texts, including the Manimekalai and the Cilappatikaram, show close parallel with the Sanskrit traditions of Krishna and his gopi companions, later widespread in North Indian text and imagery. Hardy argues that the Sanskrit Bhagavata Purana is essentially a Sanskrit "translation" of the bhakti of the Tamil alvars.

Devotion to the southern Indian Mal (Perumal) may be an early form of Krishnaism, since Mal appears as a divine figure, largely like Krishna with some elements of Vishnu. The Alvars, whose name can be translated "immersed", were devotees of Perumal. They codified the Vaishnava canon of the south with their most significant liturgy, the Naalayira Divya Prabandham, traced to the 10th century as a compilation by Nathamuni. Their poems show a pronounced orientation to the Vaishnava, and often Krishna, side of Mal. But they do not make the distinction between Krishna and Vishnu on the basis of the concept of the avatars. Yet, according to Hardy, the term "Mayonism" should be used instead of "Krishnaism" when referring to Mal or Mayon. The early Alvars glorified Vishnu bhakti, but also expressed sympathy for Shiva bhakti, sometimes even describing Shiva and Vishnu as one, although they do recognise their united form as Vishnu.

=== Gupta era ===
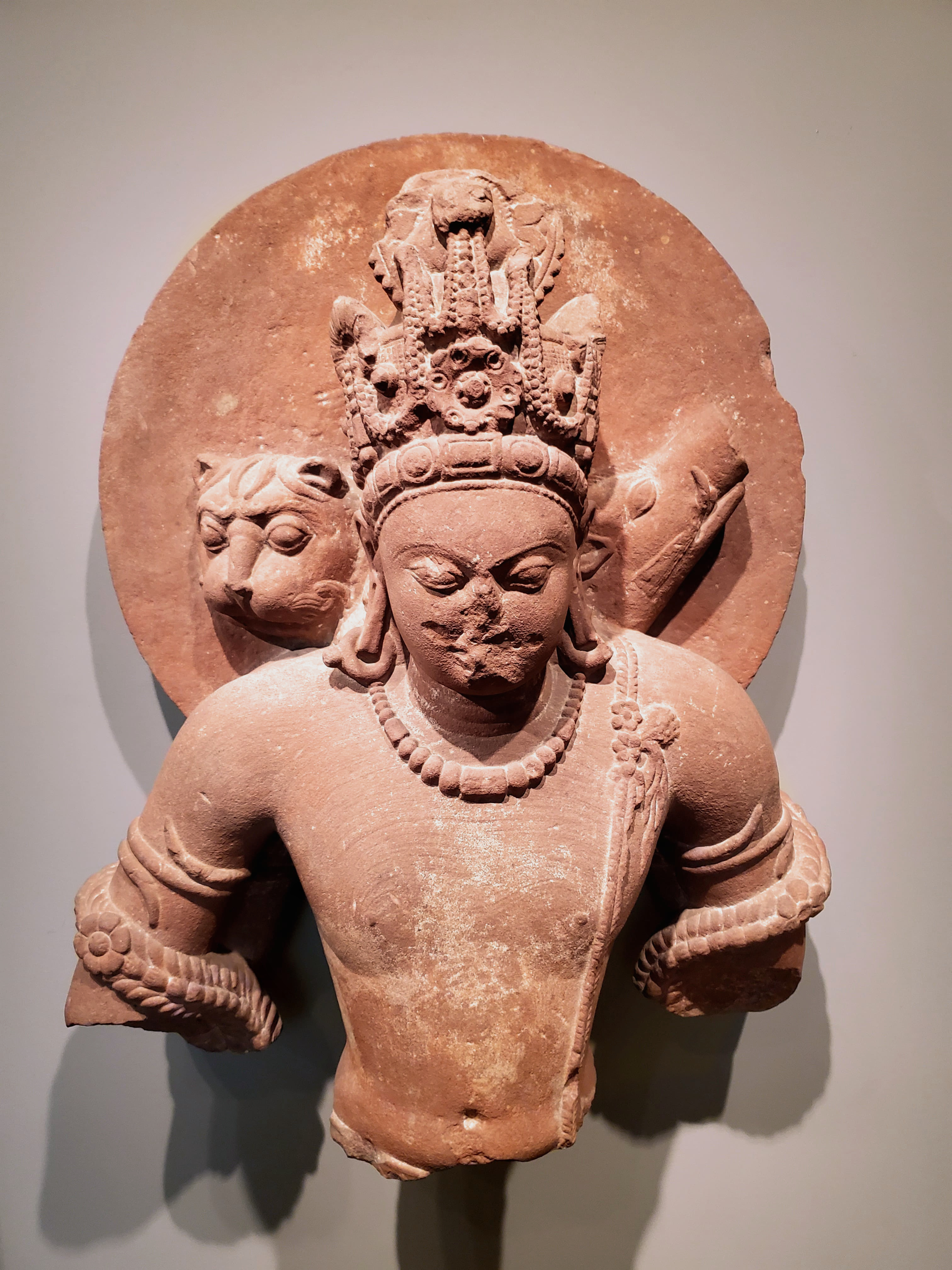
Vishnu in three incarnations (Vaikuntha Chaturmurti): Vishnu himself or Krishna in human form, Varaha as a boar, Narasimha as a lion. Gupta art, Mathura, mid-5th century CE. Boston Museum

Most of the Gupta kings, beginning with Chandragupta II (Vikramaditya) (375–413 CE) were known as Parama Bhagavatas or Bhagavata Vaishnavas. But following the Huna invasions, especially those of the Alchon Huns circa 500 CE, the Gupta Empire declined and fragmented, ultimately collapsing completely, with the effect of discrediting Vaishnavism, the religion it had been so ardently promoting. The newly arising regional powers in central and northern India, such as the Aulikaras, the Maukharis, the Maitrakas, the Kalacuris or the Vardhanas preferred adopting Saivism instead, giving a strong impetus to the development of the worship of Shiva, and its ideology of power. Vaisnavism remained strong mainly in the territories which had not been affected by these events: South India and Kashmir.

=== Early medieval period ===
After the Gupta age, Krishnaism became a major current of Vaishnavism, and Vaishnavism developed into various sects and subsects, most of them emphasising bhakti, which was strongly influenced by south Indian religiosity. Modern scholarship places Nimbarkacharya (c.7th century CE) in this period; he propounded Radha-Krishna worship and his doctrine later came to be known as Dvaita-advaita.

Vaishnavism in the 10th century started to employ Vedanta-arguments, possibly continuing an older tradition of Vishnu-oriented Vedanta predating Advaita Vedanta. Many of the early Vaishnava scholars such as Nathamuni, Yamunacharya and Ramanuja, contested Adi Shankara's Advaita, instead emphasising devotion (bhakti) to Vishnu. Vaishnavism flourished in predominantly Shaivite Tamil Nadu during the seventh to tenth centuries CE with the twelve Alvars, saints who spread the sect to the common people with their devotional hymns. The temples that the Alvars visited or founded are now known as Divya Desams. Their poems in praise of Vishnu and Krishna in the Tamil language are collectively known as Naalayira Divya Prabandha (4000 divine verses).

=== Later medieval period ===
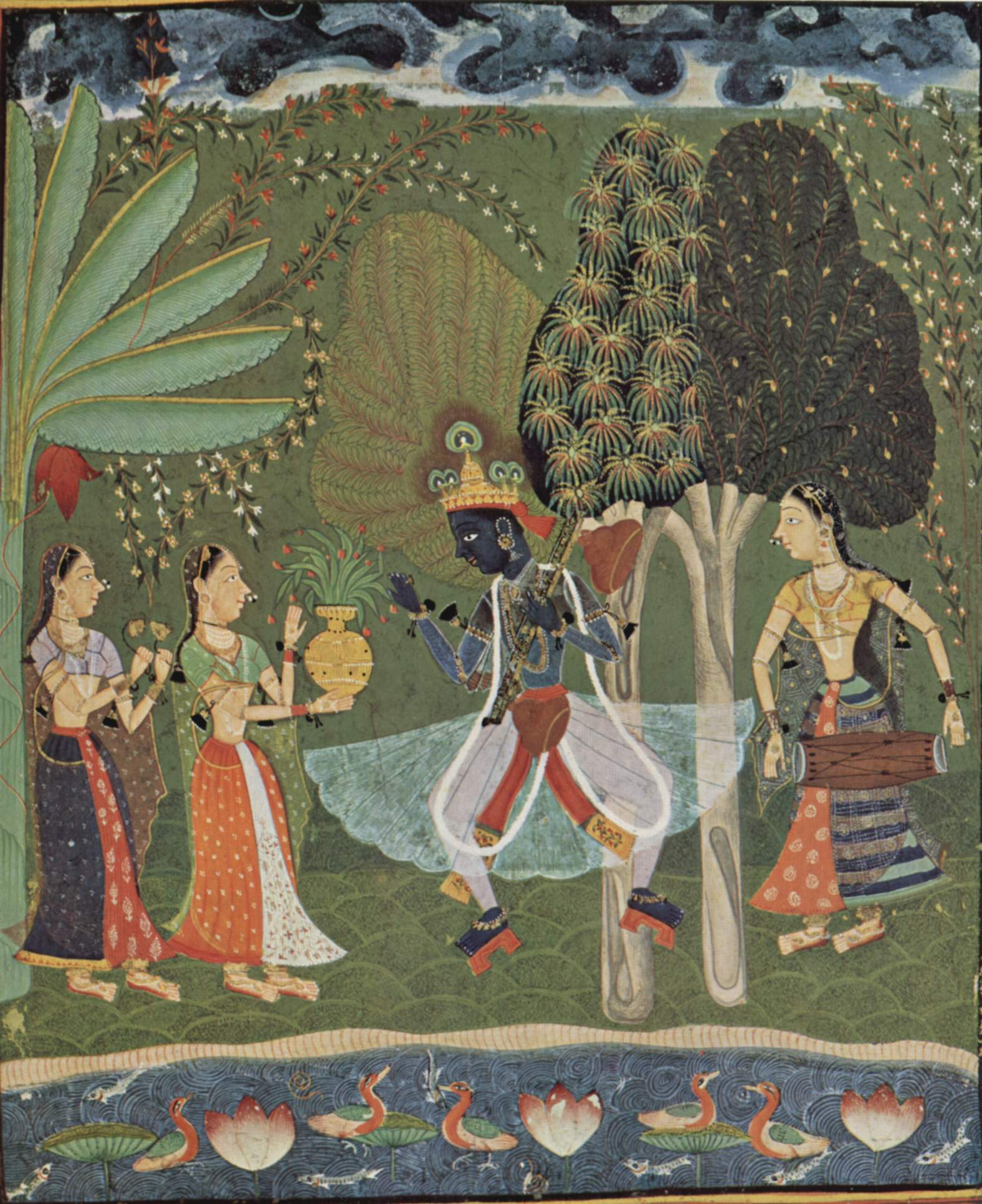
Krishna with Gopis, painted c. 1660.

The Bhakti movement of late medieval Hinduism started in the 7th century, but rapidly expanded after the 12th century. It was supported by the Puranic literature such as the Bhagavata Purana, poetic works, as well as many scholarly bhasyas and samhitas.

This period saw the growth of Vaishnava sampradayas (denominations or communities) under the influence of scholars such as Ramanuja, Nimbarka, Madhva and Vallabha. Bhakti poets or teachers such as Manavala Mamunigal, Namdev, Ramananda, Sankardev, Surdas, Tulsidas, Eknath, Tyagaraja, Chaitanya Mahaprabhu and many others influenced the expansion of Vaishnavism. Mirabai was also part of this movement. These scholars rejected Shankara's doctrines of Advaita Vedanta, particularly Ramanuja in the 12th century, and Vedanta Desika and Madhva in the 13th century, building their theology on the devotional tradition of the Alvars (Sri Vaishnavas).

In North and Eastern India, Vaishnavism gave rise to various late Medieval movements such as Ramananda in the 14th century, Sankaradeva in the 15th and Vallabha and Chaitanya in the 16th century. Historically, it was Chaitanya Mahaprabhu who founded congregational chanting of holy names of Krishna in the early 16th century after becoming a sannyasi.

=== Modern times ===
During the 20th century, Vaishnavism spread from India and is now practised in many places around the globe, including North America, Europe, Africa, Russia and South America. A pioneer of Vaishnavite mission to the West was sannyasi Baba Premananda Bharati (1858–1914), the author of the first full-length treatment of Bengali Vaishnavism in English, Sree Krishna—the Lord of Love. He founded the "Krishna Samaj" society in New York City in 1902 and a temple in Los Angeles. The global status of Vaishnavism is largely due to the growth of the ISKCON movement, founded by A. C. Bhaktivedanta Swami Prabhupada in 1966.

== Beliefs ==
=== Theism with many varieties ===
Vaishnavism is centred on the devotion of Vishnu and his avatars. According to Schweig, it can be "characterized as a polymorphic monotheism, i.e. a theology that recognises many forms (ananta rupa) of the one, single unitary divinity," since there are many forms of one original deity, with Vishnu taking many forms. In contrast, Okita states that the different denominations within Vaishnavism are best described as theism, pantheism and panentheism.

The Vaishnava sampradaya started by Madhvacharya is a monotheistic tradition in which Vishnu (Krishna) is omnipotent, omniscient and omnibenevolent. The Sri Vaishnavism sampradaya associated with Ramanuja also has monotheistic elements, but differs in several ways, such as goddess Lakshmi and god Vishnu are considered inseparable and equal divinities. According to some scholars, Sri Vaishnavism emphasises panentheism, and not monotheism, with a theology of "transcendence and immanence", in which God interpenetrates everything in the universe, and empirical reality is God's body. The Vaishnava sampradaya associated with Vallabhacharya is a form of pantheism, in contrast with other Vaishnavism traditions. According to Schweig, the Gaudiya Vaishnava tradition of Chaitanya is closer to a "polymorphic bi-monotheism" because both goddess Radha and god Krishna are simultaneously regarded as supreme.

Vaishnavism includes the doctrine of avatar (divine incarnation), wherein Vishnu incarnates numerous times, in different forms, to restore cosmic order. These avatars include Narayana, Vasudeva, Rama, and Krishna; with each associated tradition regarding one of them as supreme.

==== Vishnuism and Krishnaism ====
The term "Krishnaism" (Kṛṣṇaism) has been used by scholars to describe a large group of independent traditions (sampradayas) within Vaishnavism that regard Krishna as the Supreme God, while "Vishnuism" may be used for sects that focus on Vishnu and see Krishna as an Avatar rather than a transcended Supreme Being. While most Vaishnava traditions recognise Krishna as an avatar of Vishnu, only Krishna-centred traditions identify the Supreme Being (Svayam Bhagavan, Brahman, the source of the Trimurti) with Krishna and his forms (Radha Krishna, Vithoba and others). This is its difference from such groups as Ramaism, Radhaism, Sitaism, etc.

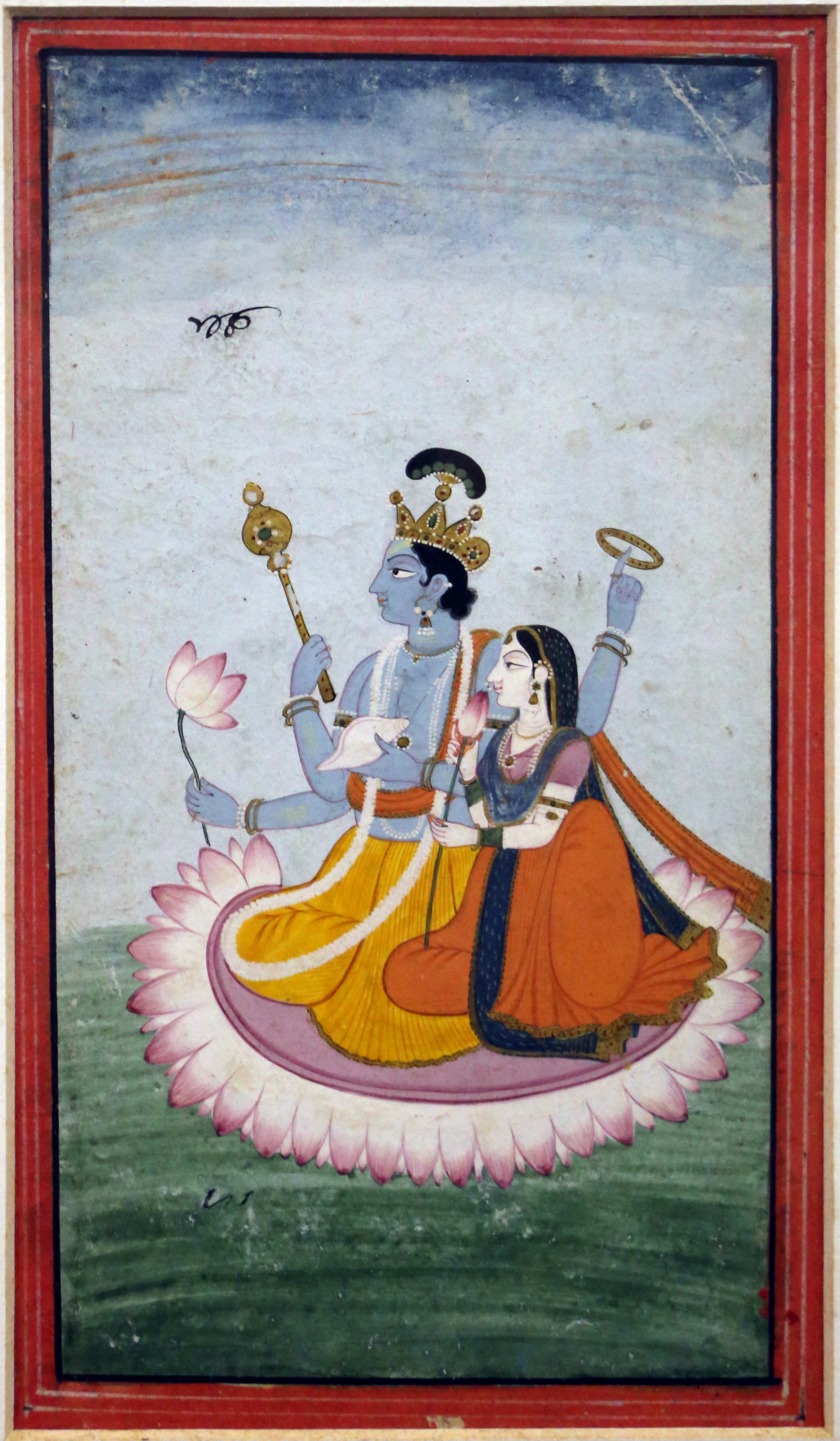
Vishnu and Lakshmi, the chief deities of veneration in Sri Vaishnavism

==== Vishnu ====
In Vishnu-centred sects, Vishnu (Narayana) is regarded as the one supreme God. Texts such as the Epics and Puranas describe Vishnu as the source of many incarnations (avatars), through which his supremacy is expressed. Other deities such as Shiva, Ganesha, Surya, or Durga are acknowledged, but are understood as subordinate. To the devotees of Sri Vaishnava Sampradaya, "Lord Vishnu is the Supreme Being and the foundation of all existence." Lakshmi, his consort, is described to act as the mediatrix between Vishnu and his devotees, intervening to offer her grace and forgiveness. According to Vedanta Desika, the divine couple Lakshmi Narayana pervade and transcend the universe, which is described to be their body. They are described to support all life, both material and spiritual. In this theology, Lakshmi is conceived as the supreme mother and Narayana as the supreme father of creation.

==== Krishna ====
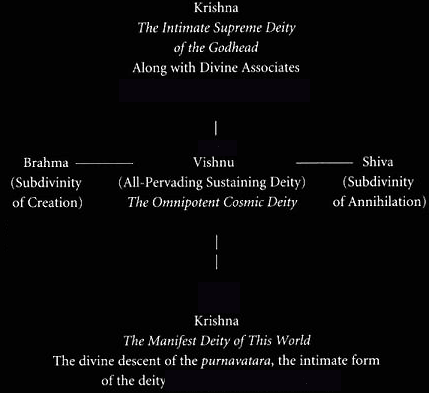
Relationship between different forms of Krishna as Paripurna avatara of Vishnu and as Svayam Bhagavan in Chaitanya school of Vaishnavism

In the Krishna-centred Vaishnavism traditions, such as the Nimbarka Sampradaya (the first Krishnaite Sampradaya attributed to Nimbarka), Ekasarana Dharma, Gaudiya Vaishnavism, Mahanubhava, Rudra Sampradaya (Pushtimarg), Vaishnava-Sahajiya, and Warkari, Krishna is worshipped as the One Supreme form of God and source of all avatars, Svayam Bhagavan.

Krishnaism is often also called Bhagavatism—perhaps the earliest Krishnite movement centred on Krishna-Vasudeva (about 2nd century BCE). The Bhagavata Purana asserts Krishna as "Bhagavan Himself," and subordinates to itself all other forms: Vishnu, Narayana, Purusha, Ishvara, Hari, Vasudeva, Janardana etc.

Krishna is often described as dark-skinned and depicted as a young cowherd boy playing a flute or as a youthful prince giving philosophical direction and guidance, as in the Bhagavad Gita. His stories appear across a wide range of Hindu traditions, where it is believed that God appears to his devoted worshippers in many different forms, depending on their particular desires.

==== Radha Krishna ====
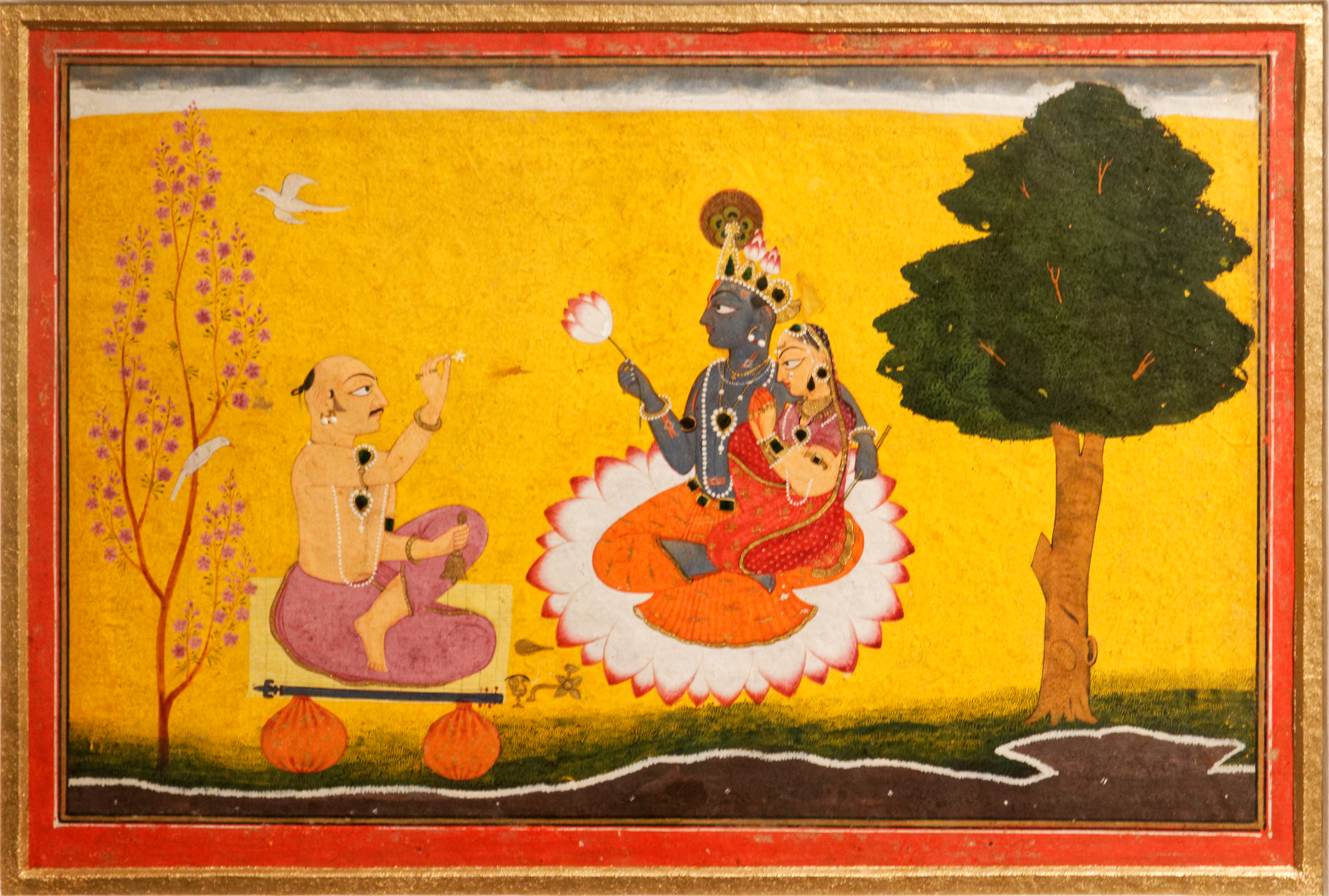
Jayadeva worships Radha Krishna, c. 1730 painting by Manaku.

Radha Krishna is the combination of both the feminine as well as the masculine aspects of God. Krishna is often referred as Svayam bhagavan in Gaudiya Vaishnavism theology and Radha is Krishna's internal potency and supreme beloved. With Krishna, Radha is acknowledged as the supreme goddess, for it is said that she controls Krishna with her love. It is believed that Krishna enchants the world, but Radha enchants even him. Therefore, she is the supreme goddess of all. Radha and Krishna are avatars of Lakshmi and Vishnu respectively. In the region of India called Braj, Radha and Krishna are worshipped together, and their separation cannot even be conceived. And, some communities ascribe more devotional significance to Radha.

While there are much earlier references to the worship of this form of God, it is since Jayadeva wrote the poem Gita Govinda in the twelfth century CE, that the topic of the spiritual love affair between the divine Krishna and his consort Radha, became a theme celebrated throughout India. It is believed that Krishna has left the "circle" of the rasa dance to search for Radha. The Chaitanya school believes that the name and identity of Radha are both revealed and concealed in the verse describing this incident in Bhagavata Purana. It is also believed that Radha is not just one cowherd maiden, but is the origin of all the gopis, or divine personalities that participate in the rasa dance.

==== Avatars ====
The primary meaning of avatara is descent. It is primarily used in a Vaishnava context, but is also used in other contexts, including the Shaiva context. It refers to the descent of any deity into the world. It is sometimes used along with other terms like manifestation and birth, which mark the deity's being born in a particular place and family after they descend. There are several kinds of avatars: guṇāvatāras, līlāvatāras, pūrṇāvatāras, aṃśāvatāras, and arcāvatāras. According to the Bhagavata Purana, there are twenty-two avatars of Vishnu, including Rama and Krishna. The Dashavatara, or concept of the ten avatars of Vishnu, is a later concept but became much more prevalent. They include Matsya (fish), Kūrma (tortoise), Varāha (boar), Narasiṃha (man-lion), Vāmana (dwarf), Paraśarāma, Rāma, Kṛṣṇa, Buddha, and Kalki. In the Bhagavad Gita, Krishna states that God takes birth eon after eon (yuga).

==== Vyuhas ====
The Pancaratrins follow the vyuhas doctrine, which says that God has four manifestations (vyuhas), namely Vasudeva, Samkarsana, Pradyumna, and Aniruddha. These four manifestations represent "the Highest Self, the individual self, mind, and egoism."

=== Restoration of dharma ===
Vaishnavism theology has developed the concept of avatar (incarnation) around Vishnu as the preserver or sustainer. His avataras, asserts Vaishnavism, descend to empower the good and fight evil, thereby restoring dharma. This is reflected in the passages of the Bhagavad Gita as:

Whenever righteousness wanes and unrighteousness increases I send myself forth.
For the protection of the good and for the destruction of evil,
and for the establishment of righteousness,
I come into being age after age.

— Bhagavad Gita 4.7–8

In Vaishnava theology, such as is presented in the Bhagavata Purana and the Pancaratra, whenever the cosmos is in crisis, typically because the evil has grown stronger and has thrown the cosmos out of its balance, an avatar of Vishnu appears in a material form, to destroy evil and its sources, and restore the cosmic balance between the everpresent forces of good and evil. The most known and celebrated avatars of Vishnu, within the Vaishnavism traditions of Hinduism, are Krishna, Rama, Narayana and Vasudeva. These names have extensive literature associated with them; each has its own characteristics, legends, and associated arts. The Mahabharata, for example, includes Krishna, while the Ramayana includes Rama.

== Texts ==
The Vedas, the Upanishads, the Bhagavad Gita, and the Agamas are the scriptural sources of Vaishnavism. The Bhagavata Purana is a revered and widely celebrated text, parts of which, a few scholars such as Dominic Goodall, include as a scripture. Other important texts in the tradition include the Mahabharata and the Ramayana, as well as texts by various sampradayas (denominations within Vaishnavism). In many Vaishnava traditions, Krishna is accepted as a teacher whose teachings are in the Bhagavad Gita and the Bhagavata Purana.

=== Scriptures ===
==== Vedas and Upanishads ====
Vaishnavism, just like all Hindu traditions, considers the Vedas as the scriptural authority. All traditions within Vaishnavism consider the Brahmanas, the Aranyakas and the Upanishads embedded within the four Vedas as Sruti, while Smritis, which include all the epics, the Puranas and its Samhitas, states Mariasusai Dhavamony, are considered as "exegetical or expository literature" of the Vedic texts.

The Vedanta schools of Hindu philosophy, which interpreted the Upanishads and the Brahma Sutra, provided the philosophical foundations of Vaishnavism. Due to the ancient and archaic language of the Vedic texts, interpretations varied among different schools, leading to differences between the denominations (sampradayas) of Vaishnavism. These interpretations have created different traditions within Vaishnavism, from dualistic (Dvaita) Vedanta of Madhvacharya, to nondualistic (Advaita) Vedanta of Madhusudana Sarasvati.

Axiology in a Vaishnava Upanishad

The charity or gift is the armour in the world,
All beings live on the gift of the other,
Through gifts strangers become friends,
Through gifts, they ward off difficulties,
On gifts and giving, everything rests,
That is why charity is the highest.

— Mahanarayana Upanishad 63.6

===== Vaishnava Upanishads =====
Along with the reverence and exegetical analysis of the ancient Principal Upanishads, Vaishnava-inspired scholars authored 14 Vishnu avatar-focussed Upanishads that are called the Vaishnava Upanishads. These are considered part of 95 minor Upanishads in the Muktikā Upanishadic corpus of Hindu literature. The earliest among these were likely composed in 1st millennium BCE, while the last ones in the late medieval era.

All of the Vaishnava Upanishads either directly reference and quote from the ancient Principal Upanishads or incorporate some ideas found in them; most cited texts include the Brihadaranyaka Upanishad, Chandogya Upanishad, Katha Upanishad, Isha Upanishad, Mundaka Upanishad, Taittiriya Upanishad and others. In some cases, they cite fragments from the Brahmana and Aranyaka layers of the Rigveda and the Yajurveda.

The Vaishnava Upanishads present diverse ideas, ranging from bhakti-style theistic themes to a synthesis of Vaishnava ideas with Advaitic, Yoga, Shaiva and Shakti themes.

Vaishnava Upanishads
Vaishnava Upanishad	Vishnu Avatar	Composition date	Topics	Reference
Mahanarayana Upanishad	Narayana	6AD - 100 CE	Narayana, Atman, Brahman, Rudra, Sannyasa	
Narayana Upanishad	Narayana	Medieval	Mantra, Narayana is one without a second, eternal, same as all gods and universe	
Rama Rahasya Upanishad	Rama	~17th century CE	Rama, Sita, Hanuman, Atman, Brahman, mantra	
Rama tapaniya Upanishad	Rama	~11th to 16th century	Rama, Sita, Atman, Brahman, mantra, sannyasa	
Kali-Santarana Upanishad	Rama, Krishna	~14th century	Hare Krishna Maha Mantra	
Gopala Tapani Upanishad	Krishna	before the 14th century	Krishna, Radha, Atman, Brahman, mantra, bhakti	
Krishna Upanishad	Krishna	~12th-16th century	Rama predicting Krishna birth, symbolism, bhakti	
Vasudeva Upanishad	Krishna, Vasudeva	~2nd millennium	Brahman, Atman, Vasudeva, Krishna, Urdhva Pundra, Yoga	
Garuda Upanishad	Vishnu	Medieval	The kite-like bird vahana (vehicle) of Vishnu	
Hayagriva Upanishad	Hayagriva	medieval, after the 10th century CE	Mahavakya of Principal Upanishads, Pancaratra, Tantra	
Dattatreya Upanishad	Narayana, Dattatreya	14th to 15th century	Tantra, yoga, Brahman, Atman, Shaivism, Shaktism	
Tarasara Upanishad	Rama, Narayana	~11th to 16th century	Om, Atman, Brahman, Narayana, Rama, Ramayana	
Avyakta Upanishad	Narasimha	before the 7th century	Primordial nature, cosmology, Ardhanarishvara, Brahman, Atman	
Nrisimha Tapaniya Upanishad	Narasimha	before the 7th century CE	Atman, Brahman, Advaita, Shaivism, Avatars of Vishnu, Om	

==== Bhagavad Gita ====
The Bhagavad Gita is a central text in Vaishnavism, and especially in the context of Krishna. The Bhagavad Gita is an important scripture not only within Vaishnavism, but also to other traditions of Hinduism. It is one of three important texts of the Vedanta school of Hindu philosophy, and has been central to all Vaishnavism sampradayas.

The Bhagavad Gita is a dialogue between Krishna and Arjuna, and presents Bhakti, Jnana and Karma yoga as alternate ways to spiritual liberation, with the choice left to the individual. The text discusses dharma, and its pursuit as duty without craving for fruits of one's actions, as a form of spiritual path to liberation. The text, state Clooney and Stewart, succinctly summarises the foundations of Vaishnava theology that the entire universe exists within Vishnu, and all aspects of life and living is not only a divine order but divinity itself. Bhakti, in Bhagavad Gita, is an act of sharing, and a deeply personal awareness of spirituality within and without.

The Bhagavad Gita is a summary of the classical Upanishads and Vedic philosophy, and closely associated with the Bhagavata and related traditions of Vaishnavism. The text has been commented upon and integrated into diverse Vaishnava denominations, such as by the medieval era Madhvacharya's Dvaita Vedanta school and Ramanuja's Vishishtadvaita Vedanta school, as well as 20th century Vaishnava movements such as the Hare Krishna movement by His Divine Grace A. C. Bhaktivedanta Swami Prabhupada.

==== Vaishnava Agamas ====
The Pancaratra Samhitas (literally, five nights) is a genre of texts where Vishnu is presented as Narayana and Vasudeva, and this genre of Vaishnava texts is also known as the Vaishnava Agamas. Its doctrines are found embedded in the stories within the Narayaniya section of the Mahabharata. Narayana is presented as the ultimate unchanging truth and reality (Brahman), who pervades the entirety of the universe and is asserted to be the preceptor of all religions.

The Pancaratra texts present the Vyuhas theory of avatars to explain how the absolute reality (Brahman) manifests into material form of ever changing reality (Vishnu avatar). Vasudeva, state the Pancaratra texts, goes through a series of emanations, where new avatars of him appear. This theory of avatar formation syncretically integrates the theories of evolution of matter and life developed by the Samkhya school of Hindu philosophy. These texts also present cosmology, methods of worship, tantra, Yoga and principles behind the design and building of Vaishnava temples (Mandira nirmana). These texts have guided religiosity and temple ceremonies in many Vaishnava communities, particularly in South India.

The Pancaratra Samhitas are tantric in emphasis, and at the foundation of tantric Vaishnava traditions such as the Sri Vaishnava tradition. They complement and compete with the vedic Vaishnava traditions such as the Bhagavata tradition, which emphasise the more ancient Vedic texts, ritual grammar and procedures. While the practices vary, the philosophy of Pancaratra is primarily derived from the Upanishads, its ideas synthesise Vedic concepts and incorporate Vedic teachings.

The three most studied texts of this genre of Vaishnava religious texts are Paushkara Samhita, Sattvata Samhita and Jayakhya Samhita. The other important Pancaratra texts include the Lakshmi Tantra and Ahirbudhnya Samhita. Scholars place the start of this genre of texts to about the 7th or 8th century CE, and later.

=== Other texts ===
==== Mahabharata and Ramayana ====
The two Indian epics, the Mahabharata and the Ramayana present Vaishnava philosophy and culture embedded in legends and dialogues. The epics are considered the fifth Veda in Hindu culture. The Ramayana describes the story of Rama, an avatara of Vishnu, and is taken as a history of the 'ideal king', based on the principles of dharma, morality and ethics. Rama's wife Sita, his brother Lakshman, with his devotee and follower Hanuman all play key roles within the Vaishnava tradition as examples of Vaishnava etiquette and behaviour. Ravana, the evil king and villain of the epic, is presented as an epitome of adharma, playing the opposite role of how not to behave.

The Mahabharata is centred around Krishna, presents him as the avatar of transcendental supreme being. The epic details the story of a war between good and evil, each side represented by two families of cousins with wealth and power, one depicted as driven by virtues and values while other by vice and deception, with Krishna playing pivotal role in the drama. The philosophical highlight of the work is the Bhagavad Gita.

==== Puranas ====
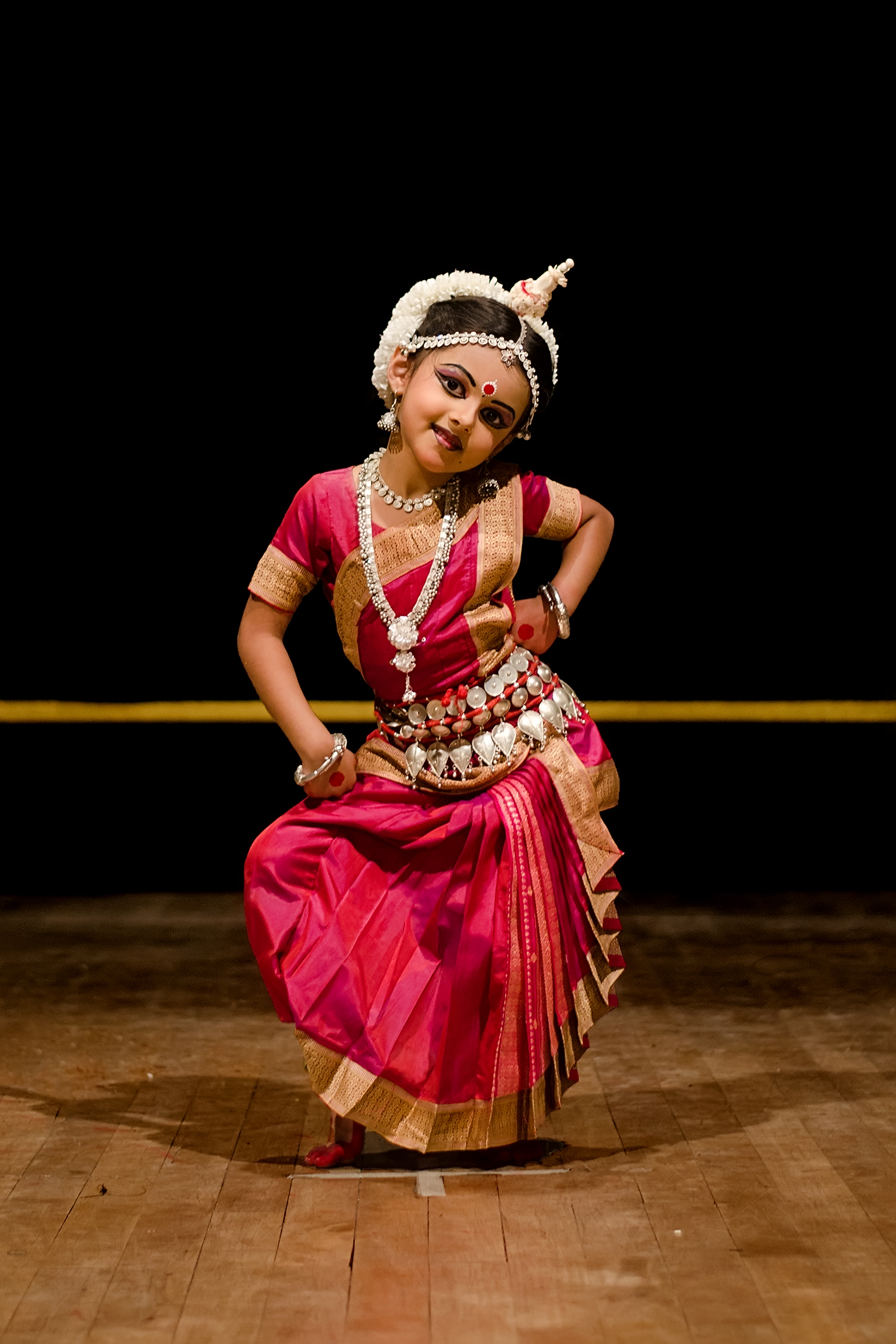
The Krishna stories have inspired numerous dramatic and dance arts in Indian culture.

The Puranas are an important source of entertaining narratives and histories, states Mahony, that are embedded with "philosophical, theological and mystical modes of experience and expression" as well as reflective "moral and soteriological instructions".

More broadly, the Puranic literature is encyclopedic, and it includes diverse topics such as cosmogony, cosmology, genealogies of gods, goddesses, kings, heroes, sages, and demigods, folk tales, travel guides and pilgrimages, temples, medicine, astronomy, grammar, mineralogy, humor, love stories, as well as theology and philosophy. The Puranas were a living genre of texts because they were routinely revised, their content is highly inconsistent across the Puranas, and each Purana has survived in numerous manuscripts which are themselves inconsistent. The Hindu Puranas are anonymous texts and likely the work of many authors over the centuries.

Of the 18 Mahapuranas (great Puranas), many have titles based on one of the avatars of Vishnu. However, quite many of these are actually, in large part, Shiva-related Puranas, likely because these texts were revised over their history. Some were revised into Vaishnava treatises, such as the Brahma Vaivarta Purana, which originated as a Puranic text dedicated to the Surya (Sun god). Textual cross referencing evidence suggests that in or after 15th/16th century CE, it went through a series of major revisions, and almost all extant manuscripts of Brahma Vaivarta Purana are now Vaishnava (Krishna) bhakti oriented. Of the extant manuscripts, the main Vaishnava Puranas are Bhagavata Purana, Vishnu Purana, Nāradeya Purana, Garuda Purana, Vayu Purana and Varaha Purana. The Brahmanda Purana is notable for the Adhyatma-ramayana, a Rama-focussed embedded text in it, which philosophically attempts to synthesise Bhakti in god Rama with Shaktism and Advaita Vedanta. While an avatar of Vishnu is the main focus of the Puranas of Vaishnavism, these texts also include chapters that revere Shiva, Shakti (goddess power), Brahma and a pantheon of Hindu deities.

The philosophy and teachings of the Vaishnava Puranas are bhakti oriented (often Krishna, but Rama features in some), but they show an absence of a "narrow, sectarian spirit". To its bhakti ideas, these texts show a synthesis of Samkhya, Yoga and Advaita Vedanta ideas.

In Gaudiya Vaishnava, Vallabha Sampradaya and Nimbarka sampradaya, Krishna is believed to be a transcendent, Supreme Being and source of all avatars in the Bhagavata Purana. The text describes modes of loving devotion to Krishna, wherein his devotees constantly think about him, feel grief and longing when Krishna is called away on a heroic mission.

Jiva Gosvami's Bhajan Kutir at Radha-kunda. Jiva Goswamis Sandarbhas summarise Vedic sources of Gaudiya Vaishnava tradition's accretion of the concept Krishna to be the supreme Lord.

== Practices ==
=== Bhakti ===
The Bhakti movement originated among Vaishnavas of South India during the 7th-century CE, spread northwards from Tamil Nadu through Karnataka and Maharashtra towards the end of 13th-century, and gained wide acceptance by the fifteenth-century throughout India during an era of political uncertainty and Hindu-Islam conflicts.

The Alvars, which literally means "those immersed in God", were Vaishnava poet-saints who sang praises of Vishnu as they travelled from one place to another. They established temple sites such as Srirangam, and spread ideas about Vaishnavism. Their poems, compiled as Divya Prabhandham, developed into an influential scripture for the Vaishnavas. The Bhagavata Purana's references to the South Indian Alvar saints, along with its emphasis on bhakti, have led many scholars to give it South Indian origins, though some scholars question whether this evidence excludes the possibility that bhakti movement had parallel developments in other parts of India.

Vaishnava bhakti practices involve loving devotion to a Vishnu avatar (often Krishna), an emotional connection, a longing and continuous feeling of presence. All aspects of life and living is not only a divine order but divinity itself in Vaishnava bhakti. Community practices such as singing songs together (kirtan or bhajan ), praising or ecstatically celebrating the presence of god together, usually inside temples, but sometimes in open public are part of varying Vaishnava practices. Early Vaishnava practices noted by Patanjali also included festive gatherings in temples with musical instruments. Other practical methods includes devotional practices such as chanting mantras (japa), performing rituals, and engaging in acts of service (seva) within the community. These help Vaishnavas socialise and form a community identity.

=== Tilaka ===
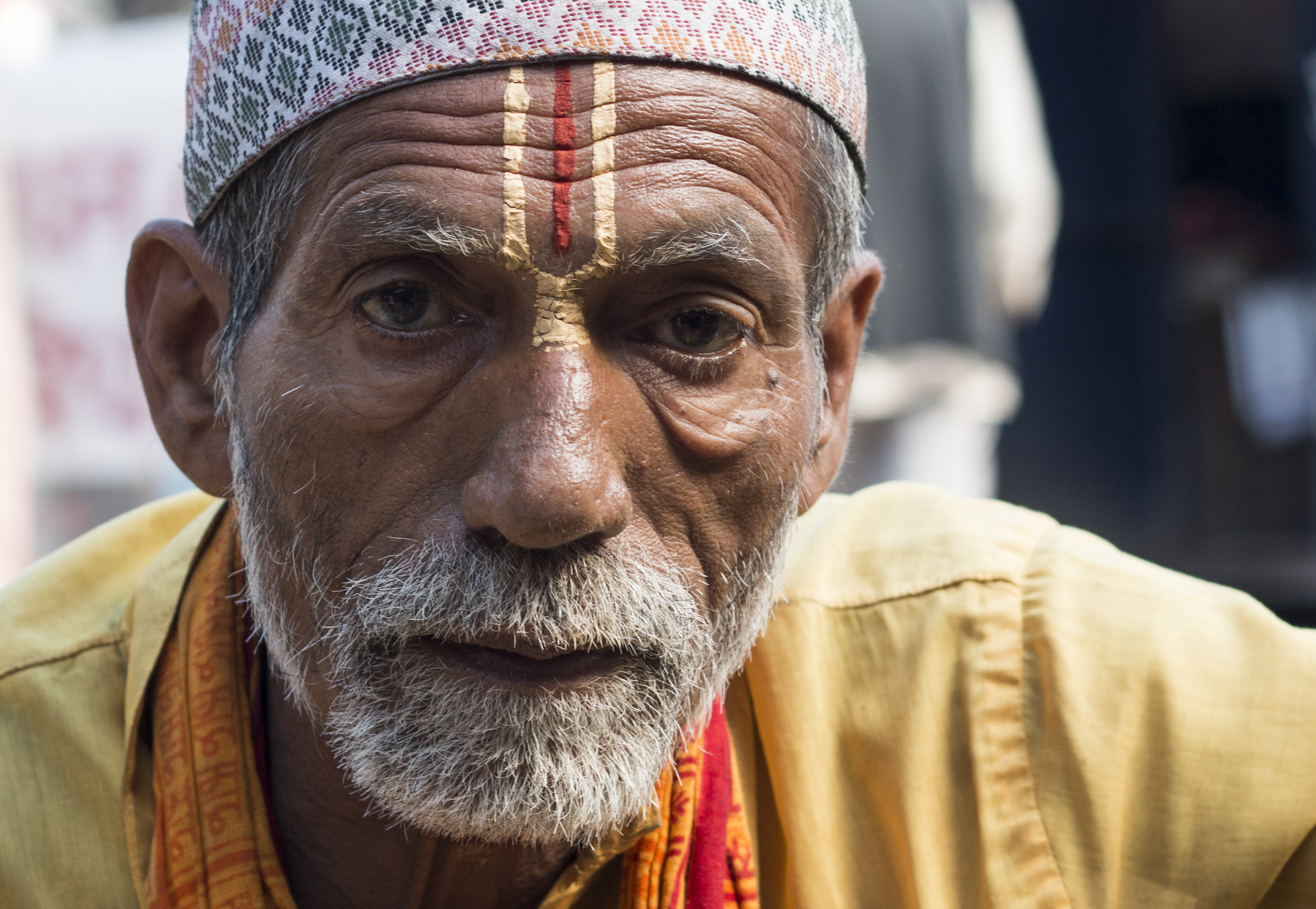
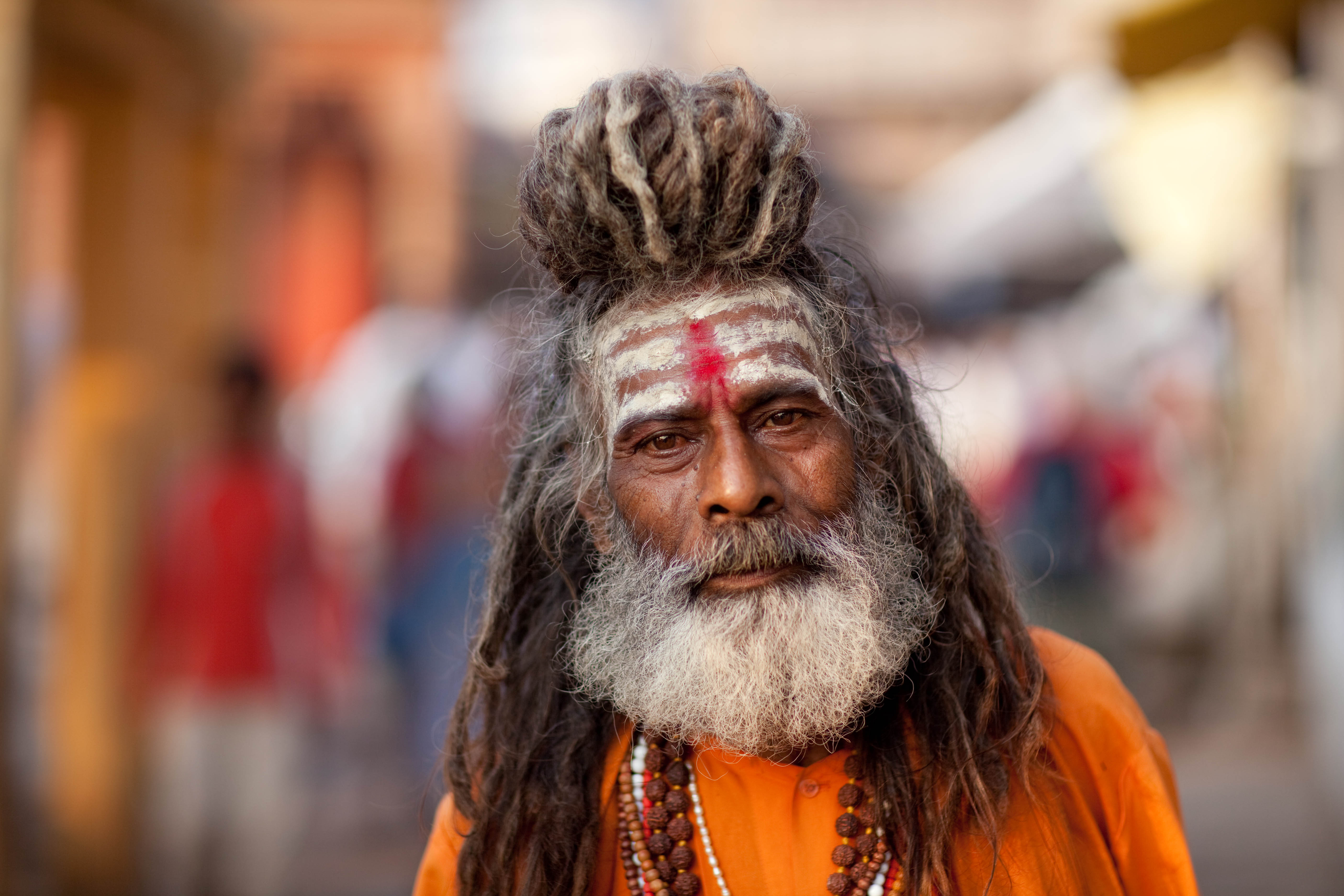
Left: A Vaishnava Hindu with Tilaka (Urdhva Pundra).
Right: A Shaiva Hindu with Tilaka (Tripundra)

Vaishnavas mark their foreheads with tilaka made up of chandana (sandalwwood), either as a daily ritual, or on special occasions. The different Vaishnava sampradayas each have their own distinctive style of tilaka, which depicts the siddhanta of their particular lineage. The general tilaka pattern is of a parabolic shape resembling the letter U or two or more connected vertical lines on and another optional line on the nose resembling the letter Y, in which the two parallel lines represent the Lotus feet of Krishna and the bottom part on the nose represents the tulsi leaf.

=== Initiation ===
In tantric traditions of Vaishnavism, during the initiation (diksha) given by a guru under whom they are trained to understand Vaishnava practices, the initiates accept Vishnu as supreme. At the time of initiation, the disciple is traditionally given a specific mantra, which the disciple will repeat, either out loud or within the mind, as an act of worship to Vishnu or one of his avatars. The practice of repetitive prayer is known as japa.

In the Gaudiya Vaishnava group, one who performs an act of worship with the name of Vishnu or Krishna can be considered a Vaishnava by practice, "Who chants the holy name of Krishna just once may be considered a Vaishnava."

=== Pilgrimage sites ===
Major pilgrimage and temple sites in Vaishnavism
- indicates Char Dham

Important sites of pilgrimage for Vaishnavas include Guruvayur Temple, Srirangam, Kanchipuram, Vrindavan, Mathura, Ayodhya, Tirupati, Pandharpur (Vitthal), Puri (Jaggannath), Nira Narsingpur (Narasimha), Mayapur, Nathdwara, Dwarka, Udipi (Karnataka), Shree Govindajee Temple (Imphal), Govind Dev Ji Temple (Jaipur) and Muktinath.

=== Holy places ===
Vrindavana is considered to be a holy place by several traditions of Krishnaism. It is a centre of Krishna worship and the area includes places like Govardhana and Gokula associated with Krishna from time immemorial. Many millions of bhaktas or devotees of Krishna visit these places of pilgrimage every year and participate in a number of festivals that relate to the scenes from Krishna's life on Earth. (Note: Klostermaier: "Bhagavad Gita and the Bhagavata Purana, certainly the most popular religious books in the whole of India. Not only was Krsnaism influenced by the identification of Krsna with Vishnu, but also Vaishnavism as a whole was partly transformed and reinvented in the light of the popular and powerful Krishna religion. Bhagavatism may have brought an element of cosmic religion into Krishna worship; Krishna has certainly brought a strongly human element into Bhagavatism [...] The center of Krishna-worship has been for a long time Brajbhumi, the district of Mathura that embraces also Vrindavana, Govardhana, and Gokula, associated with Krishna from time immemorial. Many millions of Krishna bhaktas visit these places ever year and participate in the numerous festivals that reenact scenes from Krshna's life on Earth.")

On the other hand, Goloka is considered the eternal abode of Krishna, Svayam bhagavan according to some Vaishnava schools, including Gaudiya Vaishnavism and the Swaminarayan Sampradaya. The scriptural basis for this is taken in Brahma Samhita and Bhagavata Purana.

== Traditions ==
The Vaishnavism traditions may be grouped within four sampradayas, each exemplified by a specific Vedic personality. They have been associated with a specific founder, providing the following scheme: Sri Sampradaya (Ramanuja), Brahma Sampradaya (Madhvacharya), Rudra Sampradaya (Vishnuswami, Vallabhacharya), Kumaras Sampradaya (Nimbarka). (Note: (a) Steven Rosen and William Deadwyler III: "the word sampradaya literally means 'a community'." (b) Federico Squarcini traces the semantic history of the word sampradaya, calling it a tradition, and adds, "Besides its employment in the ancient Buddhist literature, the term sampradaya circulated widely in Brahamanic circles, as it became the most common word designating a specific religious tradition or denomination".) These four sampradayas emerged in early centuries of the 2nd millennium CE, by the 14th century, influencing and sanctioning the Bhakti movement.

The philosophical systems of Vaishnava sampradayas range from qualified monistic Vishishtadvaita of Ramanuja, to theistic Dvaita of Madhvacharya, to pure nondualistic Shuddhadvaita of Vallabhacharya. They all revere an avatar of Vishnu, but have varying theories on the relationship between the soul (jiva) and Brahman, on the nature of changing and unchanging reality, methods of worship, as well as on spiritual liberation for the householder stage of life versus sannyasa (renunciation) stage.

Beyond the four major sampradayas, the situation is more complicated, with the Vaikhanasas being much older than those four sampradayas, and a number of additional traditions and sects which originated later, or aligned themselves with one of those four sampradayas. Krishna sampradayas continued to be founded late into late medieval and during the Mughal Empire era, such as the Radha Vallabh Sampradaya, Haridasa, Gaudiya and others.

=== Traditions List ===
Sampradaya	Main theological preceptor	Philosophy	Founder	(Sub)schools	Founded	(Sub)school-founder	Worship
Historical traditions				Bhagavatism (Vasudevism)	1st millennium BCE	unknown	Vāsudeva, Bala Krishna, Gopala-Krishna
Historical traditions				Pancharatra	3rd century BCE	Sage Narayana	Vishnu
Historical traditions				Vaikhanasa	4th century CE	Sage Vaikhanasa	Vishnu
Sri Sampradaya	Laksmi	Vishishtadvaita ("qualified monism")	Nathamuni (10th century); Ramanujacharya	Iyengar Thenkalai	12th–14th century	Pillai Lokacharya; Manavala Mamunigal	Vishnu & Lakshmi
Sri Sampradaya	Laksmi	Vishishtadvaita ("qualified monism")	Nathamuni (10th century); Ramanujacharya	Iyengar Vadakalai	14th century	Vedanta Desika	Vishnu & Lakshmi
Brahma Sampradaya	Brahma	Tattvavada ("the realist viewpoint") or Dvaita ("dualism")	Madhvacharya	Haridasa and Sadh Vaishnavism	13th-14th century	Narahari Tirtha / Sripadaraja	Narayana / Hari (Vishnu) & Lakshmi
Brahma Sampradaya	Brahma	Achintya Bheda Abheda ("difference and non-difference")		Gaudiya Vaishnavism (Note: Based on a list of gurus found in Baladeva Vidyabhusana's Govinda-bhasya and Prameya-ratnavali, ISKCON situates Gaudiya Vaishnavism within the Brahma sampradaya, calling it Brahma-Madhva-Gaudiya Vaisnava Sampradaya.)	16th century	Chaitanya Mahaprabhu	Radha Krishna
Brahma Sampradaya	Brahma	Achintya Bheda Abheda ("difference and non-difference")		Mahanam Sampradaya	1890s	Prabhu Jagadbandhu	Radha Krishna
Rudra Sampradaya	Shiva	Shuddhadvaita ("pure nondualism")	Vishnuswami (Note: Stephen Knapp: "Actually there is some confusion about him, as it seems there have been three Vishnu Svamis: Adi Vishnu Svami (around the 3rd century BCE, who introduced the traditional 108 categories of sannyasa), Raja Gopala Vishnu Svami (8th or 9th century CE), and Andhra Vishnu Svami (14th century).")	Pushtimarg	c. 1500	Vallabhacharya	Krishna and his svarūpas, notably Shrinathji.
Nimbarka Sampradaya	Four Kumaras Narada	Dvaitadvaita ("duality in unity")	Nimbarkacharya		7th or 12th–13th century		Radha Krishna
Sant (Sant Mat) traditions				Warkari Sampradaya	13th century	Dnyaneshwar (Jñāneśvar) (Note: Gavin Flood notes that Jñāneśvar is sometimes regarded as the founder of the Warkari sect, but that Vithoba-worship predates him.)	Vithoba (Krishna)
Sant (Sant Mat) traditions				Ramanandi Sampradaya	14th century	Ramananda	Rama
Sant (Sant Mat) traditions				Bishnoi Panth	1485 CE	Guru Jambheshwar	Vishnu (Narayana/Hari) and Lakshami
Sant (Sant Mat) traditions				Kabir panth	15th century	Kabir, a disciple of Ramananda	Vishnu, Narayana, Govinda, Rama
Sant (Sant Mat) traditions				Dadu panth	16th–17th century	Dadu Dayal	non-sectarian
Sant (Sant Mat) traditions				Pranami Sampradaya	17th century	Devchandra Maharaj	Krishna
Sant (Sant Mat) traditions				Charan Dasi	18th century	Sant Charandas	Radha Krishna
Other traditions				Odia Vaishnavism (Jagannathism)	Early Middle Ages		Jagannath
Other traditions				Mahanubhava Sampradaya	12–13th century	Chakradhara	Pancha-Krishna
Other traditions				Vaishnava-Sahajiya (tantric)	15th century	Vidyapati, Chandidas	Radha Krishna
Other traditions				Ekasarana Dharma	15th–16th century	Srimanta Sankaradeva	Krishna
Other traditions				Radha Vallabh Sampradaya	16th century	Hith Harivansh Mahaprabhu	Radha, Radha Krishna
Other traditions				Swaminarayan Sampradaya	1801	Swaminarayan	Swaminarayan, Radha Krishna, Lakshmi Narayana
Other traditions				Ramsnehi Sampradaya	1817	Ram Charan (inspirator)	Rama
Other traditions				Kapadi Sampradaya			Rama
Other traditions				Haridasi Sampradaya	16th century	Swami Haridas	Radha Krishna, Banke Bihari
Other traditions				Balmikism		Sage Valmiki	Rama, Valmiki

=== Early traditions ===
==== Bhagavats ====
The Bhagavats were the early worshippers of Krishna, the followers of Bhagavat, the Lord, in the person of Krishna, Vasudeva, Vishnu or Bhagavan. The term bhagavata may have denoted a general religious tradition or attitude of theistic worship which prevailed until the 11th century, and not a specific sect, and is best known as a designation for Vishnu-devotees. The earliest scriptural evidence of Vaishnava bhagavats is an inscription from 115 BCE, in which Heliodoros, ambassador of the Greco-Bactrian king Amtalikita, says that he is a bhagavata of Vasudeva. It was supported by the Guptas, suggesting a widespread appeal, in contrast to specific sects.

==== Pancaratra ====
The Pāñcarātra is the tradition of Narayana-worship. The term pāñcarātra means "five nights," from pañca, "five,"and rātra, "nights," and may be derived from the "five night sacrifice" as described in the Satapatha Brahmana, which narrates how Purusa-Narayana intends to become the highest being by performing a sacrifice which lasts five nights.

The Narayaniya section of the Mahabharata describes the ideas of the Pāñcarātras. Characteristic is the description of the manifestation of the Absolute through a series of manifestations, from the vyuha manifestations of Vasudeva and pure creation, through the tattvas of mixed creation into impure or material creation.

The Pāñcarātra Samhitas developed from the 7th or 8th century onward, and belongs to Agamic or Tantras, setting them at odds with vedic orthodoxy. Vishnu worshipers in south India still follow the system of Pancharatra worship as described in these texts.

Although the Pāñcarātra originated in north India, it had a strong influence on south India, where it is closely related with the Sri Vaishnava tradition. According to Welbon, "Pāñcarātra cosmological and ritual theory and practice combine with the unique vernacular devotional poetry of the Alvars, and Ramanuja, founder of the Sri Vaishnava tradition, propagated Pāñcarātra ideas." Ramananda was also influenced by Pāñcarātra ideas through the influence of Sri Vaishnavism, whereby Pāñcarātra re-entered north India.

==== Vaikhanasas ====
The Vaikhanasas are associated with the Pāñcarātra, but regard themselves as a Vedic orthodox sect. Modern Vaikhanasas reject elements of the Pāñcarātra and Sri Vaishnava tradition, but the historical relationship with the orthodox Vaikhanasa in south India is unclear. The Vaikhanasas may have resisted the incorporation of the devotic elements of the Alvar tradition, while the Pāñcarātras were open to this incorporation.

Vaikhanasas have their own foundational text, the Vaikhanasasmarta Sutra, which describes a mixture of Vedic and non-Vedic ritual worship. The Vaikhanasas became chief priests in a lot of south Indian temples, where they still remain influential.

=== Early medieval traditions ===
==== Smartism ====
The Smarta tradition developed during the (early) Classical Period of Hinduism around the beginning of the Common Era, when Hinduism emerged from the interaction between Brahmanism and local traditions. According to Flood, Smartism developed and expanded with the Puranas genre of literature. By the time of Adi Shankara, it had developed the pancayatanapuja, the worship of five shrines with five deities, all treated as equal, namely Vishnu, Shiva, Ganesha, Surya and Devi (Shakti), "as a solution to varied and conflicting devotional practices."

Traditionally, Sri Adi Shankaracharya (8th century) is regarded as the greatest teacher and reformer of the Smarta. According to Hiltebeitel, Adi Shankara Acharya established the nondualist interpretation of the Upanishads as the touchstone of a revived smarta tradition. (Note: Hiltebeitel: "Practically, Adi Shankara Acharya fostered a rapprochement between Advaita and smarta orthodoxy, which by his time had not only continued to defend the varnasramadharma theory as defining the path of karman, but had developed the practice of pancayatanapuja ("five-shrine worship") as a solution to varied and conflicting devotional practices. Thus one could worship any one of five deities (Vishnu, Siva, Durga, Surya, Ganesa) as one's istadevata ("deity of choice").")

==== Alvars ====
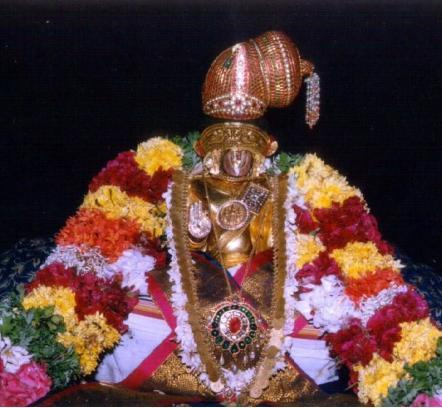
Nammalvar

The Alvars, "those immersed in god," were twelve Tamil poet-saints of South India who espoused bhakti (devotion) to the Hindu god Vishnu or his avatar Krishna in their songs of longing, ecstasy and service. The Alvars appeared between the 5th century to the 10th century CE, though the Vaishnava tradition regards the Alvars to have lived between 4200 BCE - 2700 BCE.

The devotional writings of Alvars, composed during the early medieval period of Tamil history, are key texts in the bhakti movement. They praised the Divya Desams, 108 "abodes" (temples) of the Vaishnava deities. The collection of their hymns is known as the Divya Prabandha. Their Bhakti-poems has contributed to the establishment and sustenance of a culture that opposed the ritual-oriented Vedic religion and rooted itself in devotion as the only path for salvation.

=== Contemporary traditions ===
According to Gavin Flood, the five most important contemporary Vaishnava orders are:

==== Nimbarka Sampradaya ====
Nimbarka Sampradaya, also called Kumara Sampradaya is one of the four bona fide Vaishnavism traditions. It worship Krishna with his chief consort, Radha. The tradition was founded by Nimbarkacharya in the 7th-8th or 12th-14th century CE. Nimbarka's philosophical position is dualistic monism and he centred all his devotion to the unified form of the divine couple Radha Krishna in Sakhya bhav.

==== Sri Vaishnavism ====
Sri Vaishnavism is one of the major denomination within Vaishnavism that originated in South India, adopting the prefix Sri as an homage to Vishnu's consort, Lakshmi. The Sri Vaishnava community consists of both Brahmans and non-Brahmans. It existed along with a larger Purana-based Brahamanical worshippers of Vishnu, and non-Brahmanical groups who worshipped and also adhered by non-Vishnu village deities. The Sri Vaishnavism movement grew with its social inclusiveness, where emotional devotion to the personal god (Vishnu) has been open without limitation to gender or caste. (Note: Vishnu is regionally called by other names, such as Ranganatha at Srirangam temple in Tamil Nadu.)

The most striking difference between Sri Vaishnavas and other Vaishnava groups lies in their interpretation of Vedas. While other Vaishnava groups interpret Vedic deities like Indra, Savitar, Bhaga, Rudra, etc. to be same as their Puranic counterparts, Sri Vaishnavas consider these to be different names/roles/forms of Narayana, claiming that the entire Veda is dedicated for Vishnu-worship alone. Sri Vaishnavas have remodelled Pancharatra homas like the Sudarshana homa to include Vedic Suktas in them, thus giving them a Vedic outlook.

Sri Vaishnavism developed in Tamilakam in the 10th century. It incorporated two different traditions, namely the tantric Pancaratra tradition, and the Puranic Vishnu worship of northern India with their abstract Vedantic theology, and the southern bhakti tradition of the Alvars of Tamil Nadu with their personal devotion. The tradition was founded by Nathamuni (10th century), who along with Yamunacharya, combined the two traditions and gave the tradition legitimacy by drawing on the Alvars. Its most influential leader was Ramanuja (1017-1137), who developed the Vishistadvaita ("qualified non-dualism") philosophy. Ramanuja challenged the then dominant Advaita Vedanta interpretation of the Upanishads and Vedas, by formulating the Vishishtadvaita philosophy foundations for Sri Vaishnavism from Vedanta.

Sri Vaishnava includes the ritual and temple life in the tantra traditions of Pancharatra, emotional devotion to Vishnu, and the contemplative form bhakti, in the context of householder social and religious duties. The tantric rituals refers to techniques and texts recited during worship, and these include Sanskrit and Tamil texts in South Indian Sri Vaishnava tradition. According to Sri Vaishnavism theology, moksha can be reached by devotion and service to the Lord and detachment from the world. When moksha is reached, the cycle of reincarnation is broken and the soul is united with Vishnu after death, though maintaining their distinctions in Vaikuntha, Vishnu's abode. Moksha can also be reached by total surrender and saranagati, an act of grace by the Lord. Ramanuja's Sri Vaishnavism subscribes to videhamukti (liberation in afterlife), in contrast to jivanmukti (liberation in this life) found in other traditions within Hinduism, such as the Smarta and Shaiva traditions.

Two hundred years after Ramanuja, the Sri Vaishnava tradition split into the Vadakalai (northern art) and Tenkalai (southern art) sects. The Vadakalai regard the Vedas as the greatest source of religious authority, emphasising bhakti through devotion to temple-icons, while the Tenkalai rely more on Tamil scriptures and total surrender to God. The philosophy of Sri Vaishnavism is adhered to and disseminated by the Iyengar community.

==== Sadh Vaishnavism ====
Sadh Vaishnavism is one of the major denominations within Vaishnavism that originated in Karnataka, South India, adopting the prefix Sadh which means 'true'. Madhvacharya named his Vaishnavism as Sadh Vaishnavism in order to distinguish it from the Sri Vaishnavism of Ramanuja. Sadh Vaishnavism was founded by the thirteenth-century philosopher Madhvacharya. It is a movement in Hinduism that developed during its classical period around the beginning of the Common Era. Philosophically, Sadh Vaishnavism is aligned with Dvaita Vedanta, and regards Madhvacharya as its founder or reformer. The tradition traces its roots to the ancient Vedas and Pancharatra texts. The Sadh Vaishnavism or Madhva Sampradaya is also referred to as the Brahma Sampradaya, referring to its traditional origins in the succession of spiritual masters (gurus) have originated from Brahma.

In Sadh Vaishnavism, the creator is superior to the creation, and hence moksha comes only from the grace of Vishnu, but not from effort alone. Compared to other Vaishnava schools which emphasise only on Bhakti, Sadh Vaishnavism regards Jnana, Bhakti and Vairagya as necessary steps for moksha. So in Sadh Vaishnavism — Jnana Yoga, Bhakti Yoga and Karma Yoga are equally important in order to attain liberation. The Haridasa movement, a bhakti movement originated from Karnataka is a sub-branch of Sadh Vaishnavism. Sadh Vaishnavism worships Vishnu as the highest Hindu deity and regards Madhva, whom they consider to be an incarnation of Vishnu's son, Vayu, as an incarnate saviour. Madhvism regards Vayu as Vishnu's agent in this world, and Hanuman, Bhima, and Madhvacharya to be his three incarnations; for this reason, the roles of Hanuman in the Ramayana and Bhima in the Mahabharata are emphasised, and Madhvacharya is particularly held in high esteem. Vayu is prominently shown by Madhva in countless texts.

The most striking difference between Sadh Vaishnavas and other Vaishnava groups lies in their interpretation of Vedas and their way of worship. While other Vaishnava groups deny the worship of Vedic deities such as Rudra, Indra etc., Sadh Vaishnavas worship all devatas including Lakshmi, Brahma, Vayu, Saraswati, Shiva (Rudra), Parvati, Indra, Subrahmanya and Ganesha as per "Taratamya". In fact, Madhvacharya in his Tantra Sara Sangraha clearly explained how to worship all devatas. In many of his works Madhvacharya also explained the Shiva Tattva, the procedure to worship Panchamukha Shiva (Rudra), the Panchakshari Mantra and even clearly explained why everyone should worship Shiva. Many prominent saints and scholars of Sadh Vaishnavism such as Vyasatirtha composed "Laghu Shiva Stuti", Narayana Panditacharya composed Shiva Stuti and Satyadharma Tirtha wrote a commentary on Sri Rudram (Namaka Chamaka) in praise of Shiva. Indologist B. N. K. Sharma says These are positive proofs of the fact that Madhvas are not bigots opposed to the worship of Shiva. Sharma says, Sadh Vaishnavism is more tolerant and accommodative of the worship of other gods such as Shiva, Parvati, Ganesha, Subrahmanya and others of the Hindu pantheon compared to other Vaishnava traditions. This is the reason why Kanaka Dasa though under the influence of Tathacharya in his early life did not subscribe wholly to the dogmas of Sri Vaishnavism against the worship of Shiva etc., and later became the disciple of Vyasatirtha.

The influence of Sadh Vaishnavism was most prominent on the Chaitanya school of Bengal Vaishnavism, whose devotees later started the devotional movement on the worship of Krishna as International Society for Krishna Consciousness (ISKCON) - known colloquially as the Hare Krishna Movement. It is stated that Chaitanya Mahaprabhu (1496–1534) was a disciple of Isvara Puri, who was a disciple of Madhavendra Puri, who was a disciple of Lakshmipati Tirtha, was a disciple of Vyasatirtha (1469–1539), of the Sadh Vaishnava Sampradaya of Madhvacharya. The Madhva school of thought also had a huge impact on Gujarat Vaishnava culture. The famous bhakti saint of Vallabha Sampradaya, Swami Haridas was a direct disciple of Purandara Dasa of Madhva Vaishnavism. Hence Sadh Vaishnavism also have some influence on Vallabha's Vaishnavism as well.

==== Gaudiya Vaishnavism ====
Gaudiya Vaishnavism, also known as Chaitanya Vaishnavism and Hare Krishna, was founded by Chaitanya Mahaprabhu (1486–1533) in India. "Gaudiya" refers to the Gauḍa region (present day Bengal/Bangladesh) with Vaishnavism meaning "the worship of Vishnu or Krishna". Its philosophical basis is primarily that of the Bhagavad Gita and Bhagavata Purana.

The focus of Gaudiya Vaishnavism is the devotional worship (bhakti) of Radha and Krishna, and their many divine incarnations as the supreme forms of God, Svayam Bhagavan. Most popularly, this worship takes the form of singing Radha and Krishna's holy names, such as "Hare", "Krishna" and "Rama", most commonly in the form of the Hare Krishna (mantra), also known as kirtan. It sees the many forms of Vishnu or Krishna as expansions or incarnations of the one Supreme God.

After its decline in the 18-19th century, it was revived in the beginning of the 20th century due to the efforts of Bhaktivinoda Thakur. His son Srila Bhaktisiddhanta Sarasvati Thakura founded sixty-four Gaudiya Matha monasteries in India, Burma and Europe. Thakura's disciple Srila Prabhupada went to the west and spread Gaudiya Vaishnavism by the International Society for Krishna Consciousness (ISKCON).

The Manipuri Vaishnavism is a regional variant of Gaudiya Vaishnavism with a culture-forming role among the Meitei people in the north-eastern Indian state of Manipur. There, after a short period of Ramaism penetration, Gaudiya Vaishnavism spread in the early 18th century, especially from beginning its second quarter. Raja Gharib Nawaz (Pamheiba) was initiated into the Chaitanya tradition. Most devotee ruler and propagandist of Gaudiya Vaishnavism, under the influence of Natottama Thakura's disciples, was raja Bhagyachandra, who has visited the holy for the Chaytanyaits Nabadwip.

Gaudiya Vaishnavism has also influenced the religious traditions of the Bishnupriya Manipuri community of Assam, Tripura and Manipur. The community historically adopted Vaishnavism and developed devotional traditions centred on Krishna worship, kirtan and Vaishnava religious literature.

==== Warkari tradition ====
The Warkari sampradaya is a non-Brahamanical (Note: Zelliot & Berntsen 1988, p. xviii: "Varkari cult is rural and non-Brahman in character.", Sand 1990, p. 34: "the more or less anti-ritualistic and anti-brahmanical attitudes of Warkari sampradaya.") bhakti tradition which worships Vithoba, also known as Vitthal, who is regarded as a form of Krishna/Vishnu. Vithoba is often depicted as a dark young boy, standing arms akimbo on a brick, sometimes accompanied by his main consort Rakhumai (a regional name of Krishna's wife Rukmini). The Warkari-tradition is geographically associated with the Indian state of Maharashtra.

The Warkari movement includes a duty-based approach towards life, emphasising moral behaviour and strict avoidance of alcohol and tobacco, the adoption of a strict lacto-vegetarian diet and fasting on Ekadashi day (twice a month), self-restraint (brahmacharya) during student life, equality and humanity for all rejecting discrimination based on the caste system or wealth, the reading of Hindu texts, the recitation of the Haripath every day and the regular practice of bhajan and kirtan. The most important festivals of Vithoba are held on the eleventh (ekadashi) day of the lunar months" Shayani Ekadashi in the month of Ashadha, and Prabodhini Ekadashi in the month of Kartik.

The Warkari poet-saints are known for their devotional lyrics, the abhang, dedicated to Vithoba and composed in Marathi. Other devotional literature includes the Kannada hymns of the Haridasa, and Marathi versions of the generic aarti songs associated with rituals of offering light to the deity. Notable saints and gurus of the Warkaris include Jñāneśvar, Namdev, Chokhamela, Eknath, and Tukaram, all of whom are accorded the title of Sant.

Though the origins of both his cult and his main temple are debated, there is clear evidence that they already existed by the 13th century. Various Indologists have proposed a prehistory for Vithoba worship where he was previously a hero stone, a pastoral deity, a manifestation of Shiva, a Jain saint, or even all of these at various times for various devotees.

==== Ramanandi tradition ====
The Ramanandi Sampradaya, also known as the Ramayats or the Ramavats, is one of the largest and most egalitarian Hindu sects in India, around the Ganges Plain, and Nepal today. It mainly emphasises the worship of Rama, as well as Vishnu directly and other incarnations. Most Ramanandis consider themselves to be the followers of Ramananda, a Vaishnava saint in medieval India. Philosophically, they are in the Vishishtadvaita (IAST Viśiṣṭādvaita) tradition.

Its ascetic wing constitutes the largest Vaishnava monastic order and may possibly be the largest monastic order in all of India. Rāmānandī ascetics rely upon meditation and strict ascetic practices and believe that the grace of god is required for them to achieve liberation.

==== Northern Sant tradition ====
Kabir was a 15th-century Indian mystic poet and sant, whose writings influenced the Bhakti movement, but whose verses are also found in Sikhism's scripture Adi Granth. His early life was in a Muslim family, but he was strongly influenced by his teacher, the Hindu bhakti leader Ramananda, he becomes a Vaishnavite with universalist leanings. His followers formed the Kabir panth.

Dadu Dayal (1544—1603) was a poet-sant from Gujarat, a religious reformer who spoke against formalism and priestcraft. A group of his followers near Jaipur, Rajasthan, forming a Vaishnavite denomination that became known as the Dadu Panth.

==== Other traditions ====
===== Odia Vaishnavism =====
The Odia Vaishnavism (a.k.a. Jagannathism)—the particular cult of the god Jagannath (lit. ''Lord of the Universe'') as the supreme deity, an abstract form of Krishna, the Purushottama, and Para Brahman—was origined in the Early Middle Ages. Jagannathism was a regional state temple-centred version of Krishnaism, but can also be regarded as a non-sectarian syncretic Vaishnavite and all-Hindu cult. The notable Jagannath temple in Puri, Odisha became particularly significant within the tradition since about 800 CE.

===== Mahanubhava Sampradaya =====
The Mahanubhava Sampradaya/Pantha founded in Maharashtra during the period of 12-13th century. Sarvajna Chakradhar Swami a Gujarati acharya was the main propagator of this Sampradaya. The Mahanubhavas venere Pancha-Krishna ("five Krishnas"). Mahanubhava Pantha played essential role in the growth of Marathi literature.

===== Sahajiya and Baul tradition =====
Since the 15th century in Bengal and Assam flourished Tantric Vaishnava-Sahajiya inspired by Bengali poet Chandidas, as well as related to it Baul groups, where Krishna is the inner divine aspect of man and Radha is the aspect of woman.

===== Ekasarana Dharma =====
The Ekasarana Dharma was propagated by Srimanta Sankardev in the Assam region of India.It considers Krishna as the only God. Satras are institutional centres associated with the Ekasarana dharma.

===== Radha-vallabha Sampradaya =====
The Radha-centred Radha Vallabh Sampradaya founded by the Mathura bhakti poet-saint Hith Harivansh Mahaprabhu in the 16th century occupies a unique place among other traditions. In its theology, Radha is worshiped as the supreme deity, and Krishna is in a subordinate position.

===== Pranami Sampradaya =====
The Pranami Sampradaya (Pranami Panth) emerged in the 17th century in Gujarat, based on the Radha-Krishna-focussed syncretic Hindu-Islamic teachings of Devchandra Maharaj and his famous successor, Mahamati Prannath.

===== Swaminarayan Sampradaya =====
The Swaminarayan Sampradaya was founded in 1801 in Gujarat by Sahajanand Swami from Uttar Pradesh, who is worshipped as Swaminarayan, the supreme manifestation of God, by his followers. The first temple built in Ahmedabad in 1822.

== Vaishnavism and other Hindu traditions table ==
The Vaishnavism sampradayas subscribe to various philosophies, are similar in some aspects and differ in others. When compared with Shaivism, Shaktism and Smartism, a similar range of similarities and differences emerge.

Comparison of Vaishnavism with other traditions
	Vaishnava Traditions	Shaiva Traditions	Shakta Traditions	Smarta Traditions	References
Scriptural authority	Vedas and Upanishads	Vedas and Upanishads	Vedas and Upanishads	Vedas and Upanishads	
Supreme deity	Vishnu as Mahavishnu or Krishna as Vishwarupa	Shiva as Parashiva ,	Devi as Adi Parashakti ,	None, Varies	
Creator	Vishnu	Shiva	Devi	Brahman principle	
Avatar	Key concept	Minor	Significant	Minor	
Monastic life	Accepts	Recommends	Accepts	Recommends	
Rituals, Bhakti	Affirms	Optional, Varies	Affirms	Optional	
Ahimsa and Vegetarianism	Affirms, Optional, Varies	Recommends, Optional	Optional	Recommends, Optional	
Free will, Maya, Karma	Affirms	Affirms	Affirms	Affirms	
Metaphysics	Brahman (Vishnu) and Atman (Soul, Self)	Brahman (Shiva), Atman	Brahman (Devi), Atman	Brahman, Atman	
Epistemology (Pramana)	1. Perception; 2. Inference; 3. Reliable testimony	1. Perception; 2. Inference; 3. Reliable testimony 4. Self-evident	1. Perception; 2. Inference; 3. Reliable testimony	1. Perception; 2. Inference; 3. Comparison and analogy 4. Postulation, derivation 5. Negative/ cognitive proof 6. Reliable testimony	
Philosophy (Darshanam)	Vishishtadvaita (qualified Non dualism), Dvaita (Dualism), Shuddhadvaita (Pure Non Dualism), Dvaitadvaita (Dualistic Non Dualism), Advaita (Non Dualism), Achintya Bhedabheda (Non Dualistic Indifferentiation)	Vishishtadvaita, Advaita	Samkhya, Shakti-Advaita	Advaita	
Salvation (Soteriology)	Videhamukti, Yoga, champions householder life, Vishnu is soul	Jivanmukta, Shiva is soul, Yoga, champions monastic life	Bhakti, Tantra, Yoga	Jivanmukta, Advaita, Yoga, champions monastic life	

== Demography ==
There is no data available on demographic history or trends for Vaishnavism or other traditions within Hinduism.

Estimates vary on the relative number of adherents in Vaishnavism compared to other traditions of Hinduism. (Note: Website Adherents.com gives numbers as of year 1999.) Klaus Klostermaier, in his work from 1998, and other scholars estimate Vaishnavism to be the largest Hindu denomination. (Note: According to Jones and Ryan, "The followers of Vaishnavism are many fewer than those of Shaivism, numbering perhaps 200 million.") The denominations of Hinduism, states Julius Lipner, are unlike those found in major religions of the world, because Hindu denominations are fuzzy, individuals revere gods and goddesses polycentrically, with many Vaishnava adherents recognising Sri (Lakshmi), Shiva, Parvati and others reverentially on festivals and other occasions. Similarly, Shaiva, Shakta and Smarta Hindus revere Vishnu.

Large Vaishnava communities exist throughout India, and particularly in Western Indian states, such as western Madhya Pradesh, Rajasthan, Maharashtra and Gujarat and Southwestern Uttar Pradesh. Other major regions of Vaishnava presence, particularly after the 15th century, are Odisha, Bengal and northeastern India (Assam, Manipur). Dvaita school Vaishnava have flourished in Karnataka where Madhavacharya established temples and monasteries, and in neighbouring states, particularly the Pandharpur region. Substantial presence also exists in Tripura and Punjab.

Krishna-centred Vaishnavism also has a presence outside of India, especially through its association with 1960s counter-culture, which included a number of celebrity followers, such as George Harrison, due to its promulgation worldwide by the founder-acharya of the International Society for Krishna Consciousness (ISKCON) A.C. Bhaktivedanta Swami Prabhupada.

== Academic study ==
Vaishnava theology has been a subject of study and debate for many devotees, philosophers and scholars within India for centuries. Vaishnavism has its own academic wing in University of Madras - Department of Vaishnavism. In recent decades this study has also been pursued in a number of academic institutions in Europe, such as the Oxford Centre for Hindu Studies, Bhaktivedanta College.

== Hymns ==
=== Mantras ===
- Om Namo Narayanaya
- Hare Krishna Mantra
- Om Namo Bhagavate Vasudevaya

=== Hails ===
- Jai Shri Ram
- Jai Shri Krishna
- Radhe Radhe
- Jai Siya Ram

== See also ==
- Divya Prabhandham
- Hindu denominations
- Lokhimon, a Vaishnavism movement followed by the Karbi people of Northeast India
- Nanaghat Inscription – A 1st-century BCE Vaishnava inscription
- Vasu Doorjamb Inscription – A 1st-century CE inscription from Vaishnava temple
- Pancharatra – Ancient Indian religious movement around Narayana-Vishnu (Vaishnavism)

== Sources ==
- Aiyangar, Krishnaswami (2019). Early History of Vaishnavism in South India. Forgotten Books. ISBN 978-0-243-64916-7.
- Annangaracariyar, P.B. (1971), Nalayira tivviyap pirapantam, VN Tevanatan
- Beck, Guy L., ed. (2005). Alternative Krishnas: Regional and Vernacular Variations on a Hindu Deity. Albany, NY: SUNY Press. ISBN 978-0-7914-6415-1.
- Beck, Guy L. (2005a). "Krishna as Loving Husband of God: The Alternative Krishnology of the Rādhāvallabha Sampradaya". In Guy L. Beck (ed.). Alternative Krishnas: Regional and Vernacular Variations on a Hindu Deity. Albany, NY: SUNY Press. pp. 65–90. ISBN 978-0-7914-6415-1.
- Bhandarkar, R. G. (1913). Vaisnavism Saivism And Minor Religious Systems. Verlag von Karl J. truber.
- Bryant, Edwin F., ed. (2007). Krishna: A Sourcebook. New York: Oxford University Press. ISBN 978-0-19-514891-6.
- Bryant, Edwin Francis; Ekstrand, Maria (2004). The Hare Krishna Movement: The Postcharismatic Fate of a Religious Transplant.
- Bryant, Edwin Francis; Ekstrand, Maria (2013). The Hare Krishna Movement: The Postcharismatic Fate of a Religious Transplant. New York: Columbia University Press. ISBN 978-0-231-50843-8.
- Burghart, Richard (May 1983), "Wandering Ascetics of the Rāmānandī Sect", History of Religions, 22 (4): 361–80, doi:10.1086/462930, S2CID 162304284
- Carney, Gerald T. (2020). "Baba Premananda Bharati: his trajectory into and through Bengal Vaiṣṇavism to the West". In Ferdinando Sardella; Lucian Wong (eds.). The Legacy of Vaiṣṇavism in Colonial Bengal. Routledge Hindu Studies Series. Milton, Oxon; New York: Routledge. pp. 135–160. ISBN 978-1-138-56179-3.
- Chatterjee, Asoke: Srimadbhagavata and Caitanya-Sampradaya. Journal of the Asiatic Society 37/4 (1995)1-14.
- Francis Clooney; Tony Stewart (2004). Sushil Mittal and Gene Thursby (ed.). The Hindu World. Routledge. ISBN 978-1-134-60875-1.
- Clementin-Ojha, Catherine: La renaissance du Nimbarka Sampradaya au XVI'e siècle. Contribution à l'étude d'une secte Krsnaïte. Journal asiatique 278 (1990) 327–376.
- Couture, André: The emergence of a group of four characters (Vasudeva, Samkarsana, Pradyumna, and Aniruddha) in the Harivamsa: points for consideration. Journal of Indian Philosophy 34,6 (2006) pp. 571–585.
- Dalal, Roshen (2010). Hinduism: An Alphabetical Guide. New Delhi: Penguin Books India. ISBN 978-0-14-341421-6.
- Dandekar, R. N. (1987) [Rev. ed. 2005]. "Vaiṣṇavism: An Overview". In Eliade, Mircea (ed.). The Encyclopedia of Religion. Vol. 14. New York: MacMillan.
- Dandekar, R. N. (1971). "Hinduism". In Bleeker, C. Jouco; Widengren, G. (eds.). Historia Religionum: Handbook for the History of Religions - Religions of the Present. Boston: Brill Academic Publishers. ISBN 978-90-04-02598-1.
- Das, Sri Paritosh (1988). Sahajiyā Cult of Bengal and Pancha Sakhā Cult of Orissa. Calcutta: Firma K.L. Mukhopadhyay.
- Deussen, Paul (1997). Sixty Upanishads of the Veda. Motilal Banarsidass. ISBN 978-81-208-1467-7.
  - Deussen, Paul (1997a). Sixty Upanishads of the Veda. Vol. 1. Motilal Banarsidass. ISBN 978-81-208-1467-7.
  - Deussen, Paul (1997b). Sixty Upanishads of the Veda. Vol. 2. Motilal Banarsidass. ISBN 978-81-208-1467-7.
- Doniger, Wendy (1999), Merriam-Webster's Encyclopedia of World Religions, Merriam-Webster, ISBN 978-0-87779-044-0
- Eschmann, Anncharlott; Kulke, Hermann; Tripathi, Gaya Charan, eds. (1978) [Rev. ed. 2014]. The Cult of Jagannath and the regional tradition of Orissa. South Asian Studies, 8. New Delhi: Manohar. ISBN 978-81-7304-617-9.
- Feldhaus, Anne (1983). The religious system of the Mahānubhāva sect: the Mahānubhāva Sūtrapāṭha. South Asian studies, 12. New Delhi: Manohar. ISBN 978-0-8364-1005-1.
- Flood, Gavin (1996), An introduction to Hinduism, Cambridge University Press, ISBN 978-0-521-43878-0
- Fowler, Jeaneane D. (2002). Perspectives of Reality: An Introduction to the Philosophy of Hinduism. Sussex Academic Press. ISBN 978-1-898723-94-3.
- Ganguli, Kalyan Kumar (1988), Sraddh njali, studies in Ancient Indian History. D.C. Sircar Commemoration: Puranic tradition of Krishna, Sundeep Prakashan, ISBN 978-81-85067-10-0
- Glushkova, Irina (2000). "Norms and Values in the Varkari Tradition". In Meera Kosambi (ed.). Intersections: Socio-cultural Trends in Maharashtra. New Delhi: Orient Longman. pp. 47–53. ISBN 81-250-1878-6.
- Jan Gonda, Aspects of Early Viṣṇuism:
  - Gonda, Jan (1954), Aspects of Early Viṣṇuism, N.V. Oosthoek's Uitgeverij Mij. -Utrecht
  - Gonda, Jan (1969) [1954]. Aspects of Early Viṣṇuism. Motilal Banarsidass. ISBN 978-81-208-1087-7.
  - Gonda, Jan (1993) [1954], Aspects of Early Viṣṇuism, Motilal Banarsidass Publ., ISBN 978-81-208-1087-7
- Gonda, Jan (1976). Visnuism and Sivaism - A Comparison by J Gonda.
- Gupta, Ravi M. (2007). Chaitanya Vaishnava Vedanta of Jiva Gosvami: When knowledge meets devotion. Routledge. ISBN 978-0-415-40548-5.
- Gupta, Ravi M.; Valpey, Kenneth (2013). The Bhagavata Purana: Sacred Text and Living Tradition. Columbia University Press. ISBN 978-0-231-14999-0.
- Gupta, Sanjukta (2013). Advaita Vedanta and Vaisnavism: The Philosophy of Madhusudana Sarasvati. Routledge. ISBN 978-1-134-15774-7.
- Guy, John (1992). "New evidence for the Jagannatha sect in seventeenth century Nepal". Journal of the Royal Asiatic Society. 3rd Ser. 2 (2): 213–230. doi:10.1017/S135618630000239X. S2CID 162316166.
- Hardy, Friedhelm E. (1987). "Kṛṣṇaism". In Mircea Eliade (ed.). The Encyclopedia of Religion. Vol. 8. New York: MacMillan. pp. 387–392. ISBN 978-0-02-897135-3 – via Encyclopedia.com.
- Hawley, John Stratton (2015). A Storm of Songs. Harvard University Press. ISBN 978-0-674-18746-7.
- Hiltebeitel, Alf (2013), Hinduism. In: Joseph Kitagawa, "The Religious Traditions of Asia: Religion, History, and Culture", Routledge, ISBN 978-1-136-87597-7
- Hudson, D. (1993). "Vasudeva Krsna in Theology and Architecture: A Background to Srivaisnavism". Journal of Vaiṣṇava Studies (2).
- Jackson, W.J. (1992), "A Life Becomes a Legend: Sri Tyagaraja as Exemplar", Journal of the American Academy of Religion, 60 (4): 717–736, doi:10.1093/jaarel/lx.4.717, JSTOR 1465591
- Jackson, W.J. (1991), Tyagaraja: Life and Lyrics, Oxford University Press, USA
- Jones, Constance A.; Ryan, James D. (2007). Encyclopedia of Hinduism. Encyclopedia of World Religions. J. Gordon Melton, Series Editor. New York: Facts On File. ISBN 978-0-8160-5458-9. Archived from the original on 20 October 2022.
- Anna King (2005). The intimate other: love divine in Indic religions. Orient Blackswan. ISBN 978-81-250-2801-7.
- Kinsley, David (2005). Lindsay Jones (ed.). Gale's Encyclopedia of Religion. Vol. 2 (Second ed.). Thomson Gale. ISBN 978-0-02-865735-6.
- Klostermaier, K.K. (1998), A concise encyclopedia of Hinduism, Oneworld
- Klostermaier, Klaus K. (2007), A Survey of Hinduism (3rd ed.), State University of New York Press, ISBN 978-0-7914-7081-7
- Lochtefeld, James G. (2002a). The Illustrated Encyclopedia of Hinduism, Vol. 1: A-M. Rosen Publishing. ISBN 978-0-8239-2287-1.
- Lochtefeld, James G. (2002b). The Illustrated Encyclopedia of Hinduism, Vol. 2: N-Z. Rosen Publishing. ISBN 978-0-8239-3180-4.
- Lorenzen, David N. (1995). Bhakti Religion in North India: Community Identity and Political Action. State University of New York Press. ISBN 9781438411262. OCLC 940540373.
- Macdonell, Arthur Anthony (1996) [1898]. Vedic Mythology. Motilal Banarsidass (1996 Reprint). ISBN 978-81-208-1113-3. Archived from the original on 24 April 2023.
- Matchett, Freda (2001). Krishna, Lord or Avatara?: the relationship between Krishna and Vishnu. Routledge. ISBN 978-0-7007-1281-6.
- Matchett, Freda (2000), Krishna, Lord or Avatara? the relationship between Krishna and Vishnu: in the context of the Avatara myth as presented by the Harivamsa, the Visnupurana and the Bhagavatapurana, Surrey: Routledge, ISBN 978-0-7007-1281-6
- Michaels, Alex (2004), Hinduism: Past and Present (English translation of the book first published in Germany under the title Der Hinduismus: Geschichte und Gegenwart (Verlag, 1998) ed.), Princeton: Princeton University Press
- Miśra, Narayan (2005). Durga Nandan Mishra (ed.). Annals and Antiquities of the Temple of Jagannātha. New Delhi: Sarup & Sons. ISBN 81-7625-747-8.
- Monius, Anne E. (2005). "Dance Before Doom. Krishna In The Non-Hindu Literature of Early Medieval South India". In Beck, Guy L. (ed.). Alternative Krishnas. Regional and Vernacular Variations on a Hindu Deity. Albany: State University of New York Press.
- Mukherjee, Prabhat (1981) [1940]. The History of Medieval Vaishnavism in Orissa. New Delhi: Asian Educational Services. ISBN 81-206-0229-3.
- Patel, Gautam: Concept of God According to Vallabhacarya. In: Encyclopaedia of Indian Wisdom. Prof. Satya Vrat Shastri Felicitation Volume. Vol. 2. Editor: Ramkaran Sharma. Delhi, Varanasi 2005, pp. 127–136.
- Patnaik, Tandra (2005). Śūnya Puruṣa: Bauddha Vaiṣṇavism of Orissa. DK Printworld. ISBN 978-81-246-0345-1.
- Patra, Avinash (2011). Maria Joseph (Vishnupriya Dasi) (ed.). Origin & Antiquity of the Cult of Lord Jagannath. Oxford: Oxford University weekly Journal. Archived from the original on 26 May 2021. Alt URL
- Pauwels, Heidi: Paradise Found, Paradise Lost: Hariram Vyas's Love for Vrindaban and what Hagiographers made of it. In: Pilgrims, Patrons, and Place: Localizing Sanctity in Asian Religions. Ed. by Phyllis Granoff and Koichi Shinohara. (Asian Religions and Society Series). Vancouver, Toronto 2003; pp. 124–180.
- Popular Prakashan (2000), Students' Britannica India, Volumes 1-5, Popular Prakashan, ISBN 978-0-85229-760-5
- Preciado-Solís, Benjamín (1984). The Kṛṣṇa Cycle in the Purāṇas: Themes and Motifs in a Heroic Saga. Motilal Banarsidass. ISBN 978-0-89581-226-1.
- Raj, Selva; Harman, William (2007). Dealing with Deities: The Ritual Vow in South Asia. State University of New York Press. ISBN 978-0-7914-6708-4.
- Ramnarace, Vijay (2014), Rādhā-Kṛṣṇa's Vedāntic Debut: Chronology & Rationalisation in the Nimbārka Sampradāya (PDF)
- Rocher, Ludo (1986). The Puranas. Otto Harrassowitz Verlag. ISBN 978-3-447-02522-5.
- Rosen, Steven (30 October 2006). Essential Hinduism. Bloomsbury Publishing USA. ISBN 978-0-313-07155-3.
- Rosen, Steven (2002), The hidden glory of India, Los Angeles: Bhaktivedanta Book Trust, ISBN 978-0-89213-351-2
- Rosenstein, Lucy (1998). "The Rādhāvallabha and the Haridāsā Samprādayas: A Comparison". Journal of Vaishnava Studies. 7 (1): 5–18.
- Rosenstein, Ludmila L.: The Devotional Poetry of Svami Haridas. A Study of Early Braj Bhasa Verse. (Groningen Oriental Studies 12). Groningen 1997
- Sand, Erick Reenberg (1990). "The Legend of Puṇḍarīka: The Founder of Pandharpur". In Bakker, Hans (ed.). The History of Sacred Places in India as Reflected in Traditional Literature. Leiden: E. J. Brill. pp. 33–61. ISBN 90-04-09318-4.
- Sardella, Ferdinando; Wong, Lucian, eds. (2020). The Legacy of Vaiṣṇavism in Colonial Bengal. Routledge Hindu Studies Series. Milton, Oxon; New York: Routledge. ISBN 978-1-138-56179-3.
- Sarma, S N (1966). The Neo-Vaisnavite Movement and the Satra Institution of Assam. Gauhati University. ISBN 978-8173310263.
- Schrader, F. Otto (1973). Introduction to the Pāñcarātra and the Ahirbudhnya Saṃhitā. Adyar Library and Research Centre. ISBN 978-0-8356-7277-1.
- Schwartz, Susan (2004), Rasa: performing the divine in India, New York: Columbia University Press, ISBN 978-0-231-13145-2
- Schweig, G.M. (2005), Dance of divine love: The Rasa Lila of Krishna from the Bhagavata Purana, India's classic sacred love story, Princeton University Press, ISBN 978-0-691-11446-0
- Schweig, G.M. (2013), "Krishna. The IntimateDeity", in Bryant, Edwin; Ekstrand, Maria (eds.), The Hare Krishna Movement: The Postcharismatic Fate of a Religious Transplant, Columbia University Press
- Seth, K.P. (1962), "Bhakti in Alvar Saints", The University Journal of Philosophy
- Sharma, B.N. Krishnamurti (2000) [1961]. History of Dvaita school of Vedanta and its Literature (3rd ed.). Bombay: Motilal Banarasidass. ISBN 81-208-1575-0.
- Sheridan, Daniel (1986), The Advaitic Theism of the Bhāgavata Purāṇa, Columbia, MO: South Asia Books, ISBN 978-81-208-0179-0
- Singh, Kunj Bihari (2004) [1963]. "Manipur Vaishnavism: A Sociological Interpretation". In Rowena Robinson (ed.). Sociology of Religion in India. Themes in Indian Sociology, 3. New Delhi: Sage Publ. India. pp. 125–132. ISBN 0-7619-9781-4.
- Smith, Bardwell L. (1976). Hinduism: New Essays in the History of Religions. Brill Archive. ISBN 978-90-04-04495-1.
- Tattwananda, Swami (1984), Vaisnava Sects, Saiva Sects, Mother Worship (1st rev. ed.), Calcutta: Firma KLM Private Ltd.
- Toffin, Gérard (2012). "The Power of Boundaries: Transnational Links among Krishna Pranamis of India and Nepal". In John Zavos; et al. (eds.). Public Hinduisms. New Delhi: SAGE Publ. India. pp. 249–254. ISBN 978-81-321-1696-7.
- Welbon, G. R. (2005a). "Vaiṣṇavism: Bhāgavatas". In Mircea Eliade (ed.). The Encyclopedia of Religion. Vol. 14. New York: MacMillan. pp. 9500–9509. ISBN 978-0-02-897135-3.
- Welbon, G. R. (2005b). "Vaiṣṇavism: Pāñcarātras". In Mircea Eliade (ed.). The Encyclopedia of Religion. Vol. 14. New York: MacMillan. pp. 9509–9510. ISBN 978-0-02-897135-3.
- Williams, Raymond Brady (2001). An Introduction to Swaminarayan Hinduism. New York: Cambridge University Press. ISBN 0-521-65279-0.
- Zelliot, Eleanor; Berntsen, Maxine (1988). The Experience of Hinduism: Essays on Religion in Maharashtra. SUNY Press. p. 170. ISBN 0-88706-662-3.
