= Dattatreya Upanishad =

Vaishnava Hindu text

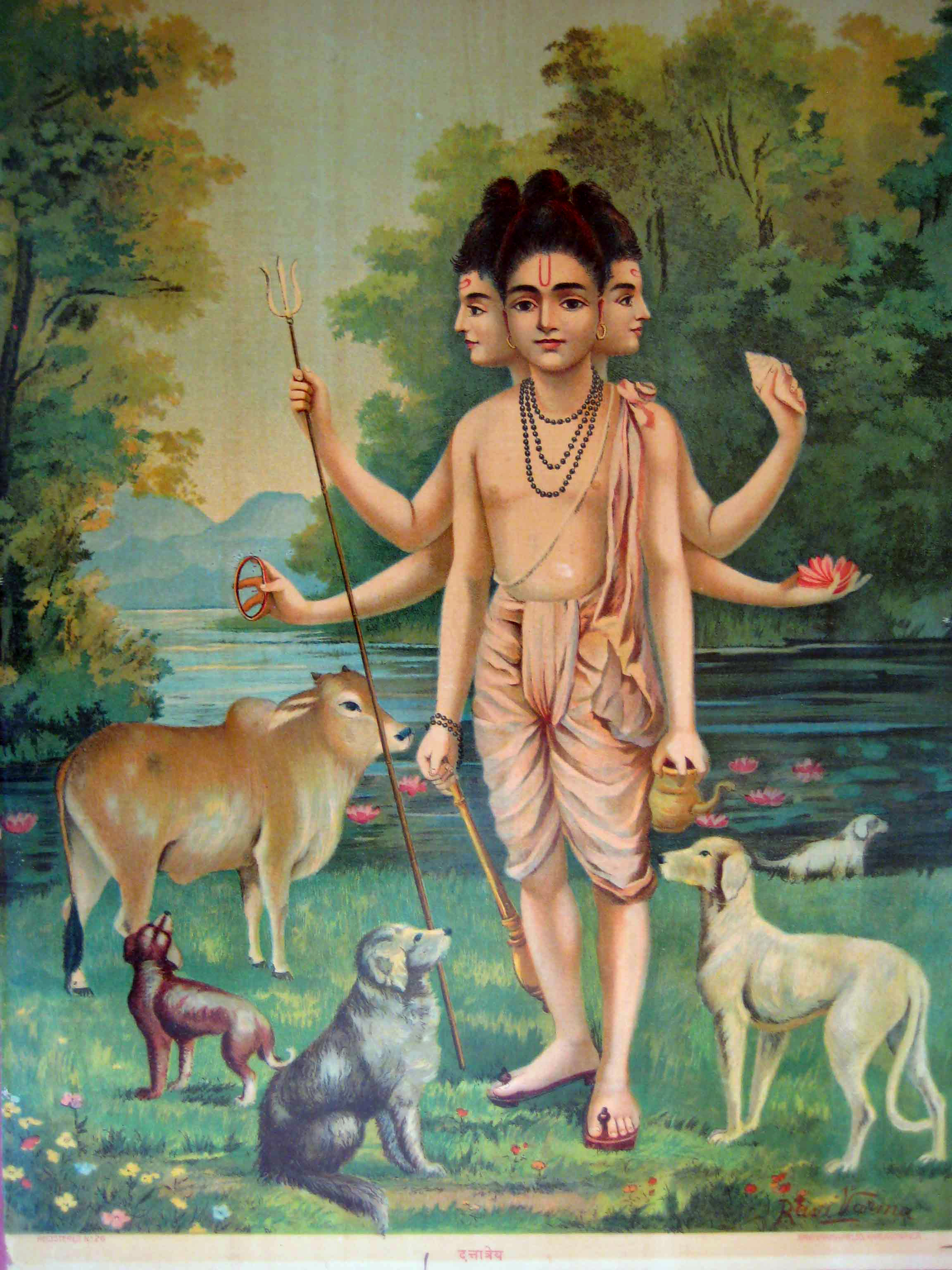
- Dattatreya Upanishad is dedicated to the deity Dattatreya
- Devanagari: दत्तात्रेय
- IAST: Dattātreya
- Title means: The god Dattatreya
- Author(s): Vishnu
- Type: Vaishnava
- Linked Veda: Atharvaveda
- Chapters: 3

The Dattatreya Upanishad (Sanskrit: दत्तात्रेय उपनिषद्), also called the Dattatreyopanishad, is a Sanskrit text and one of the minor Upanishads of Hinduism. It is attached to the Atharvaveda, and classified as a text of the Vaishnava sect, which worships the god Vishnu.

The Dattatreya Upanishad appears in the Telugu language anthology of 108 Upanishads called the Muktika canon, narrated by Rama to Hanuman, where it is listed at number 101. However, the Upanishad is neither part of the anthology of 52 popular Upanishads in north India by Colebrooke, nor is it found in the Bibliotheca Indica anthology of popular Upanishads in south India by Narayana.

The text is a Tantra and Vaishnava work, likely one of the relatively recent, 14th- or 15th-century CE era composition compared to other Upanishads. The text presents a Vaishnava mantra that is the most popular mantra in Dattatreya tradition, (Note: The mantra in verse 1.7 of the Dattatreya Upanishad is, dattatreya hare krsna unmattananda-dayaka digambara mune bala pisaca jnana-sagara Translation: Oh Dattatreya, Hari, Krishna and the crazy bliss-bestower! Oh, you clad in space [naked], the silent one, the child, the demon, the ocean of knowledge! – Translated by Antonio Rigopoulos.) as well as a series of tantric mantras for the worship of sage Dattatreya, a form of Vishnu. The text asserts that the worship of Vishnu, Narayana and Dattatreya leads one to the nature of Truth-Bliss-Knowledge.

== Date ==
The author and composition date of the text are unknown. Rigopoulos states it is a tantric sectarian work, with a mix of Vaishnavism and Shaktism ideas. Given this sectarian nature, and the description of tantric mantras in the text, it is likely a relatively late Upanishad. Sectarian Upanishads with tantra mantras were likely composed after the 10th century, states Douglas Brooks.

Patrick Olivelle states that sectarian Upanishads attached to Atharvaveda were likely composed in the 2nd-millennium, until about the 16th century. Rigopoulos states that the text likely was written in perhaps the 14th or 15th century CE, after Dattatreya sampradaya (monastic group) within Vaishnavism was well established.

== Title ==
The text is named after sage Dattatreya. He appears in several Upanishads, states Rigopoulos, because he symbolizes the mastery of Yoga and the perfectly liberated individual (Avadhuta) in ancient and medieval Hindu texts.

== Content ==
The Dattatreya Upanishad is divided into three khandas or sections. The first section opens with the creator god Brahma asking the god Vishnu (Narayana) how to overcome samsara, the cycle of birth-death-rebirth. Vishnu replies that he is Dattatreya (Datta), the Supreme God and one should meditate on Vishnu in the form of Dattatreya to free oneself from samsara. After following Vishnu's advice of meditating upon him as Dattatreya, asserts the text, Brahma realizes that the infinite and peerless Brahman is realized, as the residuum after one meditates neti, neti ("not this, not this") negation process on the phenomenal universe.

The text presents various mantras of Dattatreya. The single-syllable mantra is considered the important mantra in Tantra for a deity. Dattatreya's dam is described as the hamsa (swan), interpreted as the atman (soul) that dwells in all jivas (living beings). Its lengthened form dām is described to symbolize Parabrahman, the Supreme Brahman. The phoneme of dam, dram is popular in Dattatreya worship. The six-syllabled mantra "Om srim hrim klim glaum dram" is given. This mantra shows Tantric and Shakta influences, and contains a reference to Dattatreya's shakti (female counterpart), denoted by hrim. Srim denotes Lakshmi, Vishnu's consort/shakti, thus Dattatreya's shakti is in the mantra. The eight-syllabled "Dram Dattatreyaya namah" follows. It means 'dram obeisance to Dattatreya'.

The text says that "Dattatreyaya" stands for Satcitananda (literally "being, consciousness, bliss"), while namah denotes Bliss. This is followed by the twelve-syallabled and sixteen-syllabled mantras of Dattatreya, "Om Aam Hrim Krom Ehi Dattatreya svaha" and "Om Aim Krom Klim Klaum Hram Hrim Hraum Sauh Dattatreyaya svaha" respectively. Both mantras show Shakta impact and have terms like krom, hrim etc. which represent Dattatreya's shaktis. The mantra denotes to the "Tantric blissful union" of Dattatreya and Lakshmi, similar to the god Shiva and goddess Shakti. The poetic meter of the mantras is Gayatri, the associated rishi (sage), who is believed to have composed the mantras, is Sadashiva and presiding god is Dattatreya.

After the syllable mantras, the text presents the mantra – "Dattatreya Hare Krishna ..." – in Anustubh metre. It praises Dattatreya as Hari and Krishna, names of Vishnu. It identifies the god as an "antinomian ascetic", calling him a "crazy" (unmatta) bliss-dweller, a naked ascetic (digambara) and muni, a sage who has observed a vow of silence. It calls him a child and a Pishacha (demon), hinting towards his role as violator of moral laws. Finally, Dattatreya is called an ocean of knowledge, conveying his role as a great Teacher; this mantra is one of the most popular mantras of sage Dattatreya as a deity.

The second khanda begins with the mala-mantra ("garland-mantra") of Dattatreya, "Om Namo Bhagavate Dattatreyaya ...", which is prescribed to be used in japa. The hymn says that Dattatreya is propitiated easily by simply remembrance. He is the "dispeller of great fears", giver of great knowledge and who dwells in Consciousness and Bliss. He is called "crazy" (unmatta), child and demon, as earlier. Dattatreya is exalted as a great yogi, an Avadhuta and the son of Sage Atri and his wife Anusuya. He is described as the manifestation of all mantras (incantations), Tantras (esoteric scriptures or knowledge) and powers. He is said to fulfill the wishes in a devotee's heart, destroy worldly bondage, destroy the effects of malignant grahas (celestial bodies), take away sorrows and poverty, cure diseases and bring great joy to the mind.

The last khanda, in tradition of Upanishadic literature, tells the advantages of reading the text. He who learns the vidya (knowledge) and the mantras in the scripture is sanctified and earns the merit of reciting the Gayatri Mantra, the maha-rudra hymns and Om mantra numerous times, and is cleansed of all sin. Meditating on the mantra taught, asserts the text, leads the yogi to transmute, fuse with the supreme and realize god within himself.

== Reception ==
The description of Dattatreya worship in the Dattatreya Upanishad, states Rigopoulos, is comparable to the reverence for goddesses described in various Shaktism-related Upanishads.
