= Rudra Sampradaya =

Tradition of disciplic succession in Hinduism

In Hinduism, the Rudra Sampradaya is one of four Vaishnava sampradayas, a tradition of disciplic succession in the religion. Vaishnavism is distinguished from other schools of Hinduism by its primary worship of deities Vishnu and his Avatars as the Supreme forms of God. The ascetic Vishnuswami formed the Rudra-Sampradaya, though the sampradaya is believed to have traced its origins to the Hindu deity Shiva, also known as Rudra, who passed on the knowledge imparted to him by Vishnu, on mankind. According to Vaishnavism, Shiva, who has the Shaivism school dedicated to his worship as the Supreme God, is the first and foremost Vaishnava, or follower of Vishnu. According to the tradition, Vishnuswami was fifteenth in the line of passing of the knowledge from teacher to student. The date of formation of the sampradaya is disputed. Not much about the historical Vishnuswami is known and all his works are thought to have been lost in time. The sampradaya currently is mainly present in Gujarat/Rajasthan, through the Vallabha sampradaya. The beliefs of the sampradaya was further propagated by Vallabha Acharya (1479–1531).

Rudra sampradaya has two main divisions: Vishnuswamis, that is, followers of Vishnuswami and the Vallabhas or Pushtimarg sect, founded by Vallabha. According to William Deadwyler, the sampradaya has disappeared, except for the Pushtimarg group.

The philosophy of the sampradaya is Shuddhadvaita, or pure monism.

== See also ==
- Adi Shankara
- Brahma Sampradaya
- Pushtimarg
- Rudra
