= Yajnavalkya Upanishad =

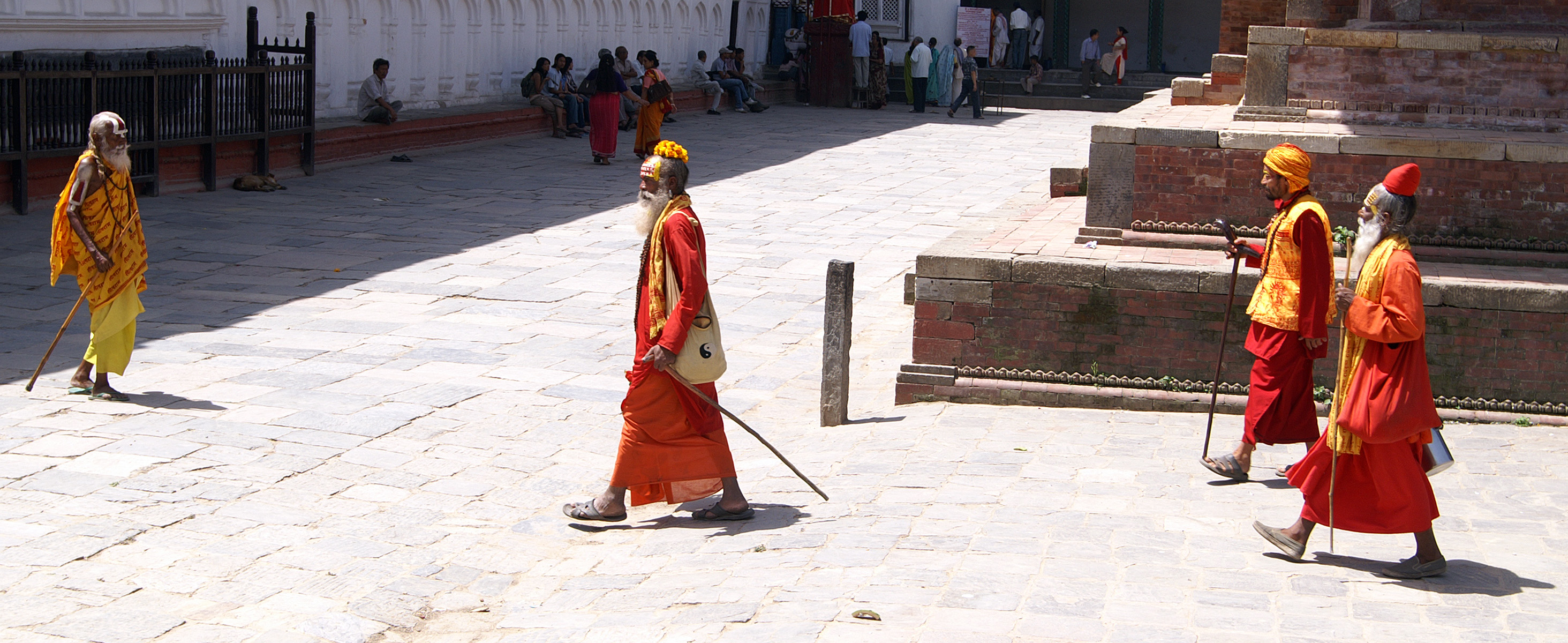
- The text discusses the life of wandering renouncers
- Devanagari: याज्ञवल्क्य
- IAST: Yājñavalkya
- Title means: Name of a Vedic sage
- Date: 14th or 15th-century
- Type: Sannyasa
- Linked Veda: Shukla Yajurveda
- Chapters: 4

The Yajnavalkya Upanishad (Sanskrit: याज्ञवल्क्य उपनिषत्, IAST: Yājñavalkya Upaniṣad) is a late medieval era Sanskrit text and a minor Upanishad of Hinduism. The text is attached to the Shukla Yajurveda, and is one of the 20 Sannyasa (renunciation) Upanishads.

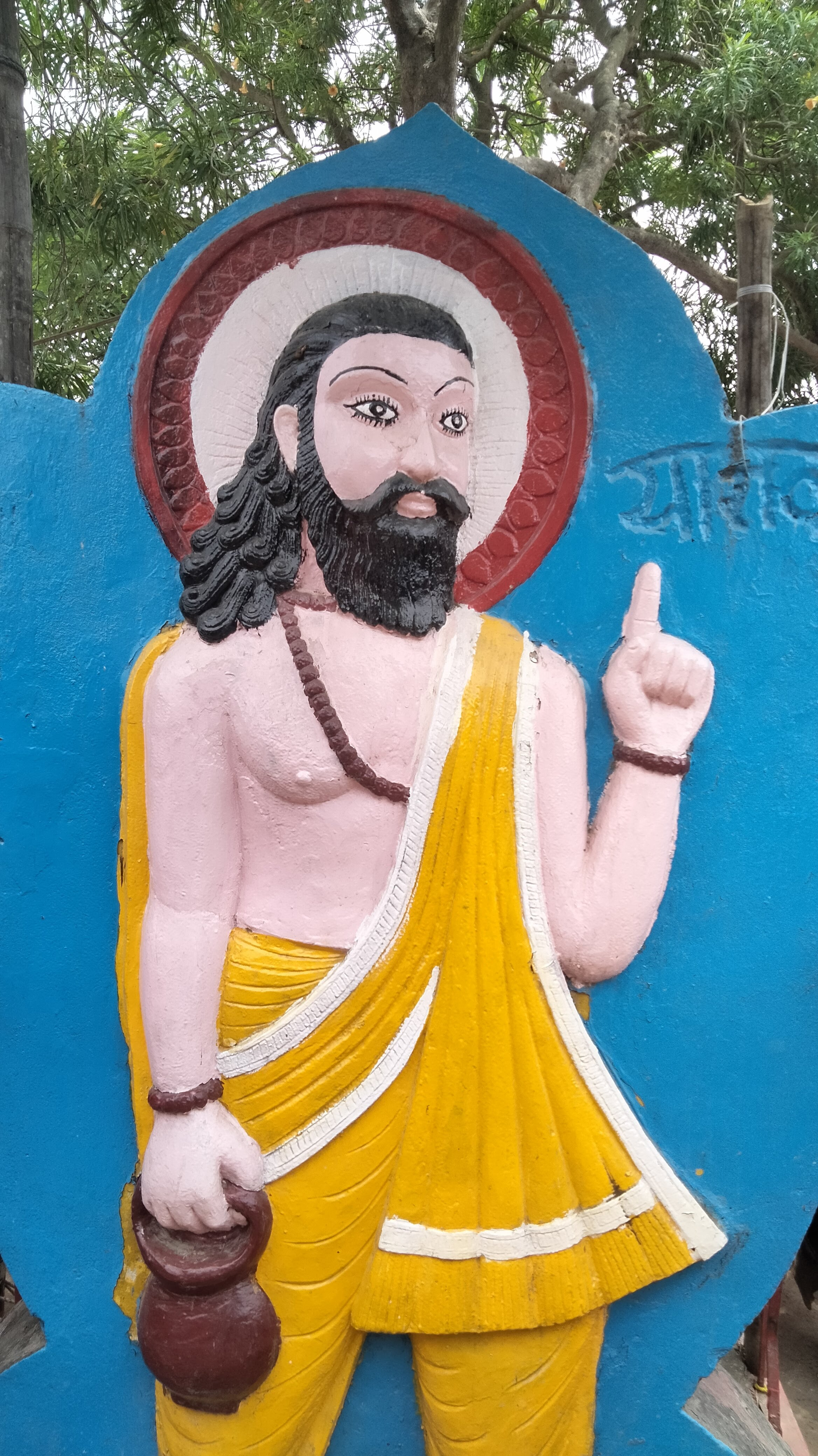
Memorial statue of the Vedic sage Yajnavalkya at Uchchaith Bhagwati Mandir in the Mithila region

== History ==
The composition date or author of Yajnavalkya Upanishad is not known, but the chapter 4 of the text is likely a late medieval era text since it references texts which were composed in 1st millennium CE and early 2nd millennium. Olivelle and Sprockhoff suggest it to be 14th- or 15th-century text.

This text has been sometimes titled as Yajnavalkyopanishad in some manuscripts. In the Telugu language anthology of 108 Upanishads of the Muktika canon, narrated by Rama to Hanuman, it is listed at number 97.

== Contents ==
The Yajnavalkya Upanishad describes the state and expected behavior from a sannyasi as he leads the monastic life after renouncing all material and social ties. It is a short text, and notable for being identical in first three parts to the more ancient Sannyasa text and influential Jabala Upanishad. The later additions in the text are also notable for referencing and extensively quoting text from the early-2nd millennium CE Yoga Vasistha, as well some quotes from the Suta Samhita of Skanda Purana and the Pancadasi of 14th-century Vidyaranya.

The quarrelsome Sadhu

One even sees renoucers who are careless, whose minds are set on outward things, who are backbiting and quarrelsome, and whose designs are condemned by the Veda.

— Yajnavalkya Upanishad, Chapter 4

The first three of four chapters of the text are identical to chapters 4, 5 and 6 of the Jabala Upanishad. The last chapter of the text declares that the verses that follow are from other texts. The compiled verses describe the observed diversity of behaviors among those who have renounced. Renouncers, states the text, include those who have renounced in name only, are quarrelsome and are still attached to worldly things, in contrast to those who reside in their inner world, with self-knowledge and are kind.

The fourth chapter is notable for socio-cultural topics from the renouncer's point of view. The successful Sannyasi, states the Upanishad for example, is one who sees "a portion of the Blessed Lord as soul in every living being", such as a dog, donkey, cow and outcast.

You are consciousness, I am consciousness, and these worlds are consciousness.

— Yajnavalkya Upanishad quoting Yoga Vasistha 5.26.11, Translated by Patrick Olivelle

However, it also includes sections for the ascetic monk giving him reasons to never desire women or children. Women, states the text, are like "a brilliant splendor of a pearl necklace" but are a source of sin, both lovely and cruel, they ensnare men into evil tendencies, and they get old, die and their bodies becomes food for other creatures. Women are chains of suffering and hold gems of sins, asserts the text. This characterization in this text, states Olivelle, is an attempt to create revulsion for a woman's body in the mind of an ascetic who has sworn to a celibate lifestyle, and similar characterization is also found in Buddhism and Jainism texts.

The Yajnavalkya Upanishad, similarly, calls the desire for son as vain. He causes pain to his parents by miscarriage, in delivery, then through illnesses. The text depicts how boys tend to fall for mischief, go to Gurukul but may not learn, commit adultery and other sins in their youth, become penniless, grow old into sorrow and suffer the vicissitudes of life. This sentiment, states Patrick Olivelle, is similar to those found in the early Buddhist text Suttanipata, in a conversation between the god of death and evil named Mara and Buddha, wherein the latter states a father grieves on account of his sons.

A renouncer, states Yajnavalkya Upanishad, has no desire for sons or married life, and goes past all these vicissitudes. He is detached. A mendicant's behavior may be perceived as madness by those caught up with cravings for the material world, but he is not. He sees his own body as a source of internal sorrow, just like he sees a prison or enemy as the source of external torture.

In the closing verses, the Upanishad emphasizes that the sannyasi must seek to perfect his own inner nature, such as renunciation of anger. Translates Olivelle, the text questions, "if you are angry at the wrongdoer, why are you then not angry at anger itself?" One must abandon all anger, because it is against one's Dharma, Artha, Kama and Moksha. Every time one is angry, one should introspectively pay homage to it, as it reveals one's inner faults, states Yajnavalkya Upanishad.

== See also ==
- Aruni Upanishad
- Jabala Upanishad
- Nirvana Upanishad
- Paramahamsa Upanishad
