= Viṣṇusvāmī =

Hindu religious leader

Religious life
- Religion: Hinduism
- Philosophy: Shuddhadvaita, Hindu philosophy, Vedanta

Viṣṇusvāmī was a Hindu religious leader. He is primarily known for having started the Rudra sampradaya. There are almost no sources on the life of Viṣṇusvāmī. The dates of Viṣṇusvāmī's life are unknown, but scholars conjecture he lived circa the 13th century. Viṣṇusvāmī's own works do not survive, and thus little is directly known of his theological positions. His students are also unknown, and his lineage did not continue uninterrupted.

According to Śrīdhara's commentaries on the Bhāgavata Purāṇa and the Viṣṇu Purāṇa (c. 1250), Viṣṇusvāmī considered Narasiṁha to be the supreme deity. Mādhavācārya's Sarvadarśanasaṅgraha (14th century) quotes the Sākarasiddhi, a work of one of Viṣṇusvāmī's followers, and states the same.

Vallabha (c. 1478 - 1530; founder of the Puṣṭimārga), in his commentary on the Bhāgavata Purāṇa entitled Subodhinī, states that Viṣṇusvāmī's devotional path was of the tamāsa guṇa, while he states his own is nirguṇa.

According to a Puṣṭimārga text, Gadādharadāsa's Saṁpradāyapradīpa (colophon states A.D. 1552–54, but according to Hawley, actually from the latter half of the 1600s), at one point in Kali Yuga a king from Drāviḍa country had conquered all of India and Viṣṇusvāmī was the son of that king's Brāhmaṇa minister. The text states that Viṣṇusvāmī prayed for seven days until Krishna appeared before him and thus started the Viṣṇusvāmī sampradāya. Centuries later Vallabha wins a śāstrārtha at the court of Vijayanagara ruler Kr̥ṣṇadevarāya and is offer the ācārya seat of the Madhva sampradāya by Vyāsatīrtha; however he rejects the offer after he receives a dream in which Vilvamaṅgala (author of the Śrīkr̥ṣṇakarṇāmr̥ta) reveals that he has waited 700 years as the last of 700 Viṣṇusvāmī ācāryas for Vallabha to take his seat and end the popular worship of Śiva as promoted by Śaṅkara.

Due to its historical inconsistencies, Hawley states this account is "clearly counterfactual" and was composed to further late 17th century Puṣṭimārga interests in promoting Vallabha's sect as one of the four sampradāyas of Vaishnavism and Vallabha as preeminent among contemporary Vaiṣṇava figures, as well as among earlier South Indian Vaiṣṇavas.

A copper land-grant plate dated to 1661 states that the Vijayanagara ruler Raṁga Rāya gifted the villages of Raṇaghaṭa and Hirekalyāṇi to the head of the Viṣṇusvāmī maṭha. The plate states that Viṣṇusvāmī was a 5th generation student of Gauḍapāda, the lineage from Nārada to Vyāsa to Śuka, to Gauḍapāda and then to Viṣṇusvāmī.

In 1812, the king of Mysore Kr̥ṣṇa Rāja Oḍeyar III remitted the taxes owed by Kr̥ṣṇānanda Svāmī, who was the head of the Viṣṇusvāmī maṭha.
