= Ramchandra Narayan Dandekar =

Indian academic (1909–2001)

- Born: 17 March 1909; Satara
- Died: 11 December 2001 (aged 92)
- Occupation(s): vedic scholar, indologist

Ramchandra Narayan Dandekar (1909–2001) was an Indologist and Vedic scholar from Maharashtra, India. He was born in Satara on 17 March 1909 and died in Pune on 11 December 2001.

== Education ==
Dandekar earned an M.A. in Sanskrit in 1931, and an M.A. in Ancient Indian Culture in 1933, both from Bombay University (renamed some years ago as Mumbai University). He joined Fergusson College in Pune in 1933 as a professor of Sanskrit and Ancient Indian Culture. In 1936, he went to Germany for further studies and received his doctoral degree from Heidelberg University in 1938 for his thesis Der Vedish Mensh.

== Career ==
Upon his return from Germany, Dandekar continued to teach at Fergusson College. In 1950, he was appointed Professor of Sanskrit and Head of the Department of Sanskrit and Prakrit Languages at the University of Poona (now called Savitribai Phule Pune University, and before that the University of Pune). He served as the Dean of the Faculty of Arts during 1959-1965. In 1964, he became the Director of the Center of Advanced Study in Sanskrit at the University of Poona, and served in that capacity until 1974.

In 1939, Dandekar had become the Honorary Secretary of the renowned Bhandarkar Oriental Research Institute (BORI), and he continued to function in that capacity till 1994, effectively running the Institute for fifty-five years. From 1994 until his death in 2001, he served as the vice-president of the Institute.

Dandekar was closely associated with numerous Indian and international organizations related to Indology, and he served and shaped these organizations in various manners. They included the All India Oriental Conference, the International Congress of Orientalists, the World Sanskrit Conference, the Sanskrit Commission of the Government of India, and the Deccan College. He served as an adviser on Indology at UNESCO.

Along with a large number of other publications, Dandekar published a monumental six-volume Vedic Suchi (Vedic bibliography) in 1946.

== Honors ==
Dandekar received many honors and awards, including the Padmabhushan title in 1962 from the President of India, and a Sahitya Akademi Fellowship in 2000.
