= Sannyasa Upanishads =

Hindu texts

Sannyasa Upanishads are a group of minor Upanishads of Hinduism related to the renunciation, monastic practice and asceticism. There are 19 Sannyasa Upanishads in the Muktika anthology of 108 Upanishads. They, along with other minor Upanishads, are generally classified separately from the thirteen major Principal Upanishads considered to be from the ancient Vedic tradition.

The Sannyasa group of minor Upanishads differ from other groupings, broadly based on their overall focus, even though there are overlaps. They contrast with the Samanya Upanishads which are of a generic nature, the Yoga Upanishads related to Yoga, the Shaiva Upanishads which highlight aspects of Shaivism, the Shakta Upanishads which focus on Shaktism, and the Vaishnava Upanishads which highlight Vaishnavism.

Six of the nineteen Sannyasa Upanishads were composed in ancient India, in the first centuries CE. Others are dated to be from the medieval era. All except one has a strong Advaita Vedanta focus, which according to Patrick Olivelle may be explained by the fact that the major monasteries of the early medieval period belonged to the Advaita Vedanta, which selected or recast those texts which fitted into their teachings.

The Sannyasa Upanishads are notable for their descriptions of the Hindu sannyasi (renouncer), his character and his state of existence as he leads the monastic life in the Ashrama tradition. They generally assert that the life of the sannyasi is one of carefree simplicity of compassion for all living beings, of reflection, not rituals, dedicated to Jnana-kanda (knowledge section of the Vedas), finding home when he is in union with truth and perfection. Self-knowledge is his journey and destination, a solitary place his monastery of bliss. They also offer contrasting views on who, how and at what age one may renounce the world for spiritual pursuits.

== Date ==
According to Sprockhoff, six of the Sannyasa Upanishads – Aruni, Kundika, Kathashruti, Paramahamsa, Jabala and Brahma – were composed before the 3rd-century CE, likely in the centuries before or after the start of the common era, states Sprockhoff. According to Olivelle, they must be younger, dating them to the first centuries CE.

The Asrama Upanishad is dated to the 3rd century CE, the Naradaparivrajaka and Satyayaniya Upanishads to around the 12th century, and about ten of the remaining Sannyasa Upanishads are dated to have been composed in the 14th to 15th century CE, well after the start of Islamic Sultanates period of South Asia in the late 12th century.

== Significance ==
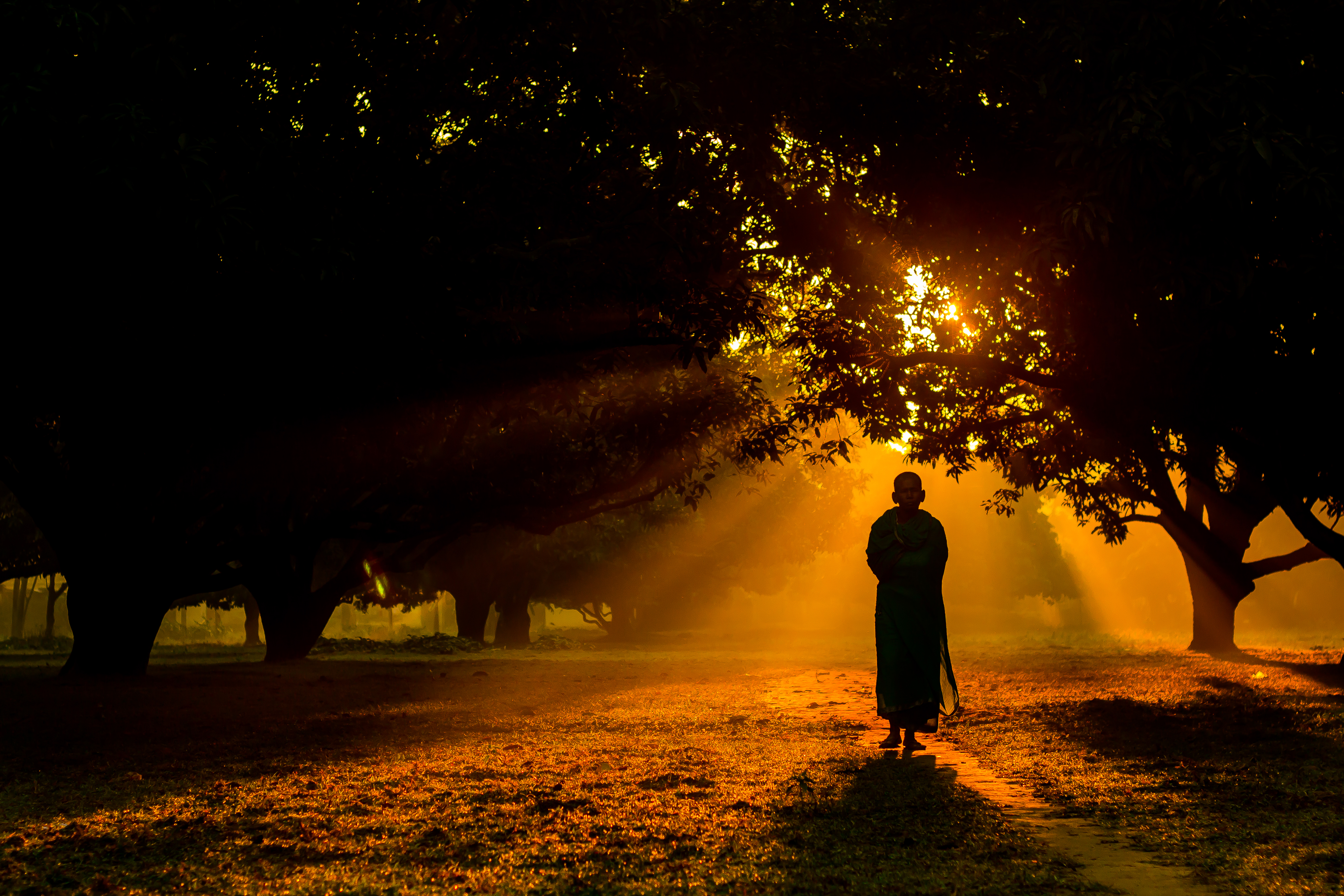
Sannyasa Upanishads focus on the monastic traditions within Hinduism.

Some of the oldest Sannyasa Upanishads have a strong Advaita Vedanta outlook, and these pre-date Adi Shankara. Most of the Sannyasa Upanishads present a Yoga and nondualism (Advaita) Vedanta philosophy. This may be, states Patrick Olivelle, because major Hindu monasteries of early medieval period (1st millennium CE) belonged to the Advaita Vedanta tradition.

The 12th-century Shatyayaniya Upanishad is a significant exception, which presents qualified dualistic and Vaishnavism (Vishishtadvaita Vedanta) philosophy. These texts were influential and often discussed by medieval era Indian scholars. For example, states Olivelle, the Jabala Upanishad was mentioned by Adi Shankara in his bhasya on Brahma Sutras, and he did so several times, at 1.2.32, 2.1.3, 3.3.37–41, 3.4.17–18 and others.

== List of 19 Sannyasa Upanishads ==
List of the Sannyasa Upanishads
| Title | Muktika serial # | Attached Veda | Period of creation |
|---|---|---|---|
| Nirvana Upanishad | 47 | Rig Veda | ~14th–15th century CE |
| Aruneya Upanishad | 16 | Sama Veda | ~1st-3rd century CE, (may be oldest) |
| Maitreya Upanishad | 29 | Sama Veda | ~14th–15th century CE |
| Brihat-Sannyasa Upanishad | 65 | Sama Veda | ~14th–15th century CE |
| Kundika Upanishad | 75 | Sama Veda | ~1st-3rd century CE, |
| Brahma Upanishad | 11 | Black Yajurveda | ~1st-3rd century CE, |
| Avadhutaka Upanishad | 79 | Black Yajurveda | ~14th–15th century CE |
| Kathashruti Upanishad | 83 | Black Yajurveda | ~1st-3rd century CE, |
| Jabala Upanishad | 13 | White Yajurveda | ~1st-3rd century CE, |
| Paramahamsa Upanishad | 19 | White Yajurveda | ~1st-3rd century CE, |
| Advayataraka Upanishad | 53 | White Yajurveda | ~14th–15th century CE |
| Bhikshuka Upanishad | 60 | White Yajurveda | ~14th–15th century CE |
| Turiyatitavadhuta Upanishad | 64 | White Yajurveda | ~14th–15th century CE |
| Yajnavalkya Upanishad | 97 | White Yajurveda | ~14th–15th century CE |
| Shatyayaniya Upanishad | 99 | White Yajurveda | ~12th century CE |
| Ashrama Upanishad | | Atharva Veda | 3rd century CE |
| Naradaparivrajaka Upanishad | 43 | Atharva Veda | ~12th century CE |
| Paramahamsa Parivrajaka Upanishad | 66 | Atharva Veda | ~14th–15th century CE |
| Parabrahma Upanishad | 78 | Atharva Veda | ~14th–15th century CE |

== Sannyasa in other Upanishads ==
Among the thirteen major or Principal Upanishads, all from the ancient era, many include sections related to Sannyasa. For example, the motivations and state of a Sannyasi are mentioned in Maitrāyaṇi Upanishad, a classical major Upanishad. Maitrāyaṇi starts with the question, "given the nature of life, how is joy possible?" and "how can one achieve moksha (liberation)?"; in later sections it offers a debate on possible answers and its views on Sannyasa.

== See also ==
- Hindu texts
- Puranas
