= Sannyasa Upanishad =

Sannyasa Upanishad or Samnyasa Upanishad may refer to:

- Sannyasa Upanishads, a group of Hindu texts called the Sannyasa Upanishads
- Brihat-Sannyasa Upanishad, a 14th- or 15th-century CE text on renunciation
- Laghu-Sannyasa Upanishad/Kundika Upanishad, pre 3rd-century CE text on renunciation

== See also ==
- Sannyasa, monastic life in Hinduism
- Upanishads, a group of Hindu texts
