= Turiyatitavadhuta Upanishad =

Minor Upanishad of Hinduism

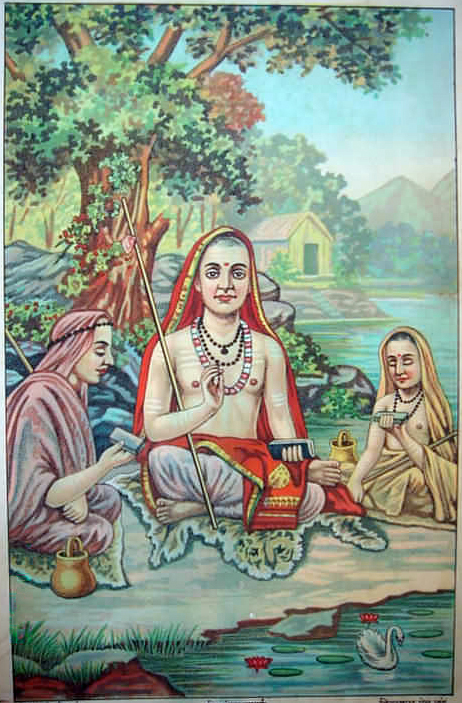
- The text describes the Hindu monastic life
- Devanagari: तुरीयातीतावधूत
- IAST: Turīyatītāvadhūta
- Title means: Liberated person beyond Turiya
- Date: 14th or 15th century
- Type: Sannyasa
- Linked Veda: Shukla Yajurveda
- Chapters: 1
- Philosophy: Vedanta

The Turiyatitavadhuta Upanishad (Sanskrit: तुरीयातीत अवधूत उपनिषद्, IAST: Turīyatītāvadhūta Upaniṣad) is a medieval era Sanskrit text and is one of the minor Upanishads of Hinduism. The text is attached to the Shukla Yajurveda, and is one of the 20 Sannyasa (renunciation) Upanishads.

The Upanishad is notable for its description of the nature and life of a self-realized monk called Turiyatita-Avadhuta, literally a totally liberated man, also called a Avadhuta or Jivanmukta. Such a person, asserts the text, is rare. The self-realized individual does not perform any rituals or rites, nor chant mantras, discriminate against or for others, and is beyond the Turiya state of consciousness. In the Paramahamsa state, he is devoted to non-dualism, is always soul-driven, is Brahman and syllable Om. The exact distinction between Paramahamsa, Avadhuta and Turiyatita-Avadhuta states is obscure, states Patrick Olivelle, but these concepts represent an attempt in the Hindu traditions to comprehend, refine and describe the inner and outer state of self-realization and the highest monastic life.

This text is a part of the collection of ancient and medieval Sannyasa Upanishads, most of which are premised entirely on the Advaita Vedanta philosophy. However, unlike other Sannyasa Upanishads, the Turiyatita text uses some Vaishnavism terminology, but not to the same extent as the Sannyasa-related Shatyayaniya Upanishad. This text also emphasizes nondualism.

== History ==
The date or author of Turiyatitavadhuta Upanishad is unclear, but given its literary style and the texts it references, it is likely a medieval era text. Olivelle and Sprockhoff date it around 14th- to 15th-century.

Manuscripts of this text are also found alternatively titled as Turiyatita Upanishad, and Turiyatitavadhutopanisad. The text is listed at number 64 in the Telugu language anthology of 108 Upanishads of the Muktika canon, narrated by Rama to Hanuman.

== Contents ==
Liberation

This divine secret and ancient treasure,
he draws into himself:
There is no one else different from me.
He does not fear pain.
He does not rejoice at pleasure.
He longs not for love.

—Turiyatita Avadhuta Upanishad (Tr: Olivelle)

The text is structured as a discourse from Narayana (Vishnu) to Brahma, about the monastic life and state of Avadhutas (highest liberated Hindu monks). Such liberated persons are rare, states the text. They, asserts the Upanishad, are an incarnation of knowledge, of detachment, of inner purity. He alone is the man of the Vedas, translates Olivelle.

The monastic life of the Avadhuta starts as Kutichaka monk, who then becomes Bahudaka monk, thereafter reaching the Hamsa state of monastic life. Beyond that, he becomes Paramahamsa monk, wherein he has deeply contemplated on his own nature and thus has discovered the entire universe, states the text. Thereafter, he becomes Avadhuta where he abandons everything, he gives up shaving, vertical line symbols on his forehead and outer symbolism of any sort.

He never blames anyone, states the Upanishad, neither praises nor criticizes anyone, he is free of deceit and arrogance, he has no hate or love for anyone, he neither gets angry nor excited by anything, he just eats if he finds something and goes hungry if he does not, asserts the Upanishad. There is no superior or inferior for such a liberated man, states the text, he sees everything as nondual, he understands and lives by the divine secret and ancient value that "there is no one else different from me". He fears no one, he fears no pain, he fears no pleasure, he has no longing for love, he is at rest in his innermost core, states the Upanishad.

The Avadhuta wanders, alone. He appears like a fool to others, asserts the text, but he doesn't care. He meditates on his own nature to find the ultimate truth Brahman, states the text; he is lost in the Brahman, his own self is all he is, he is one with Om. Such is the Avadhuta, states the Upanishad, he has done all there is to do. Thus ends the Upanishad.

== See also ==
- Jabala Upanishad
- Nirvana Upanishad
- Paramahamsa Upanishad
- Yogatattva Upanishad
