= Parabrahma Upanishad =

Minor Upanishad of Hinduism

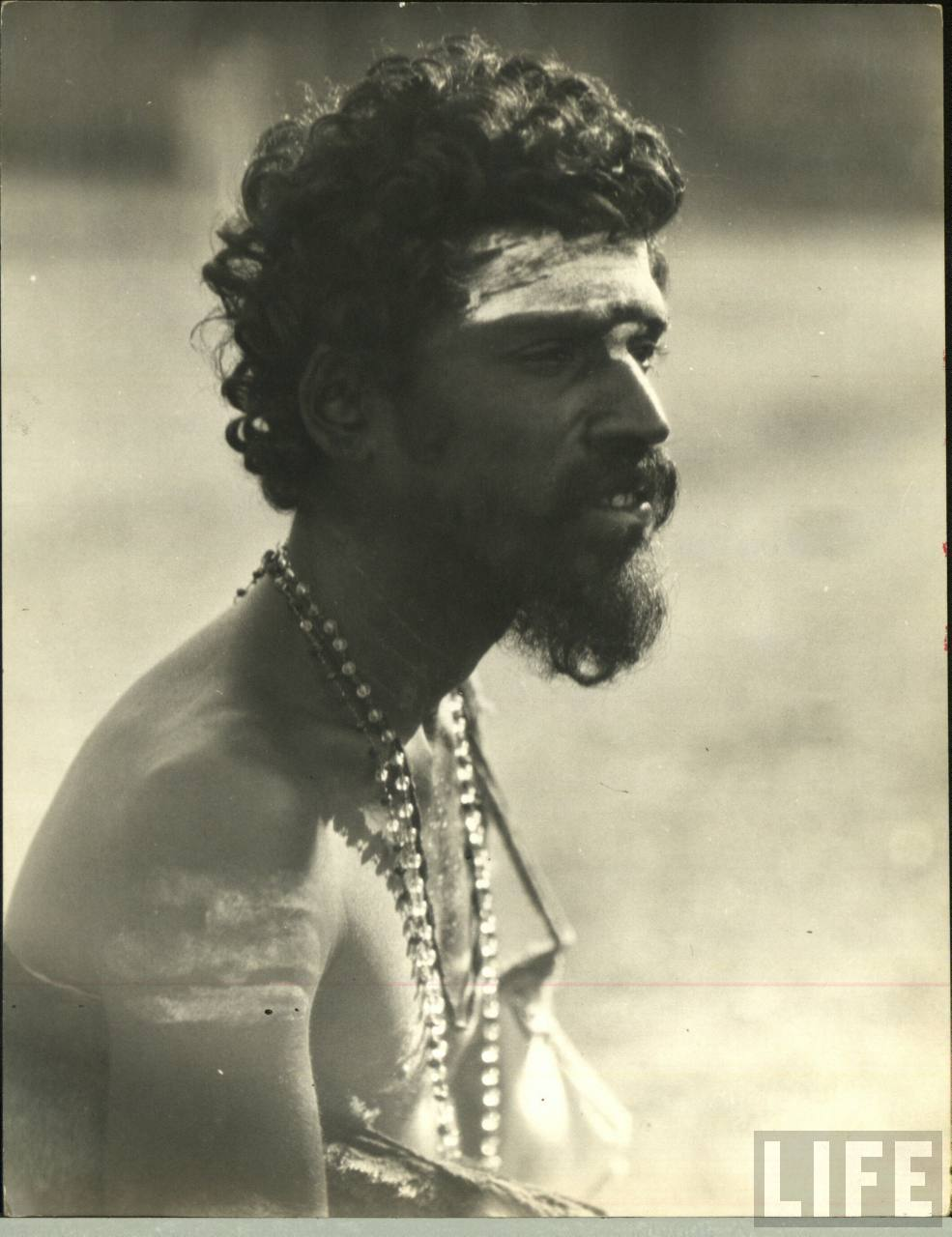
- Knowledge, not dress of the Sannyasi, is what is important, states the text
- Devanagari: परब्रह्म
- IAST: Parabrahma
- Title means: Highest Brahman
- Date: 14th or 15th-century
- Type: Sannyasa
- Linked Veda: Atharvaveda
- Chapters: 3

The Parabrahma Upanishad (Sanskrit: परब्रह्म उपनिषत्) is one of the medieval era minor Upanishads of Hinduism composed in Sanskrit. The text is attached to the Atharvaveda, and is one of the 20 Sannyasa (renunciation) Upanishads.

The Parabrahma Upanishad primarily describes the tradition of the sacred thread and topknot hair tuft worn by housesholders and why both are abandoned by Sannyasi after they have renounced for monastic lifestyle in the Hindu Ashrama system. The text asserts that knowledge is the inner sacrificial string of the renouncers, and knowledge is their true topknot. These wandering monks, states Patrick Olivelle, consider Brahman (unchanging, ultimate reality) as their inner "supreme string on which the entire universe is strung like pearls on a string". This repeated emphasis on knowledge and the abandonment of external dress and rituals in exchange for the inner equivalent of Atman-Brahman in this medieval era text is similar to those in the ancient Upanishads.

Renunciation path is same for all

People consider the use of many paths, because they are suitable for returning to Brahman. For all – for Brahma and other gods, for the divine seers, and for humans – there is only one liberation, only one Brahman, and only one Brahminhood. There are special customs peculiar to each class and order, but there is only one topknot and sacrificial string for persons of all classes and orders. For the liberated ascetic, they say, the topknot and sacrificial string are rooted in just the one mystic syllable Om. Hamsa is his topknot, the syllable Om is his sacrificial string, (...)

—Parabrahma Upanishad, Chapter 2 (Tr: Olivelle)

The text is notable for its repeated and extended discussion of why Sannyasis renounce topknot and sacred thread they wear as householders. Their hair tuft and thread is no longer external, but internal, states the text, in the form of knowledge and their awareness of Atman-Brahman that threads the universe into unified oneness.

The Parabrahma Upanishad links Brahma to consciousness of man when he is awake, Vishnu to his consciousness in dreaming state, Maheshvara (Shiva) to his consciousness in deep sleep, and Brahman as the Turiya, the fourth state of consciousness. The Upanishad calls those who merely have a mass of hair for topknot and visible sacred string across their chest as "pseudo-Brahmin" with hollow symbols, who aren't acquiring spiritual self-knowledge.

The true mendicant, the true seeker of liberation, asserts the text, abandons these external symbols, and focuses on meditating upon and understanding the nature of his soul, ultimate reality and consciousness within the heart. He is a knower of the Veda, of good conduct, the threads of his string are true (tattva) principles, and he wears knowledge within. He pays no heed to external rites, he devotes himself to inner knowledge for liberation with Om and Hamsa (Atman-Brahman).

The first chapter of the Parabrahma Upanishad is identical to the first chapter of more ancient Brahma Upanishad. The text also shares many sections with Kathashruti Upanishad. The text also references and includes fragments of Sanskrit text from the Chandogya Upanishad section 6.1, and Aruni Upanishad chapter 7.

The composition date or author of Parabrahma Upanishad is not known, but other than chapter 1 it borrows from Brahma Upanishad, the rest of the text is likely a late medieval era text. Olivelle and Sprockhoff suggest it to be 14th- or 15th-century text.

Manuscripts of this text have been sometimes titled as Parabrahmopanishad. In the Telugu language anthology of 108 Upanishads of the Muktika canon, narrated by Rama to Hanuman, it is listed at number 78.

== See also ==
- Jabala Upanishad
- Nirvana Upanishad
- Para Brahman
- Paramahamsa Upanishad
