= Kundika Upanishad =

Minor Upanishad of Hinduism

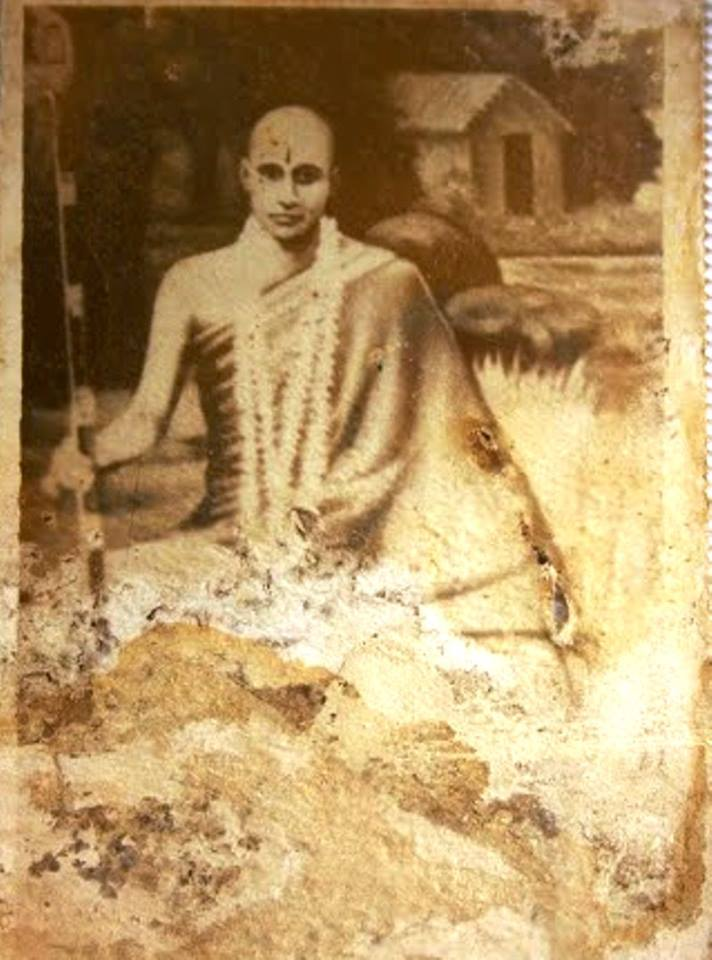
- A renouncer or sanyasi at a young age
- Devanagari: कुण्डिका
- Linked Veda: Sama Veda
- Verses: One chapter with 34 verses
- Philosophy: Vedanta

The Kundika Upanishad (Sanskrit: कुण्डिका उपनिषत्, IAST: Kuṇḍikā Upaniṣad), also known as Kundikopanishad, is an ancient text and a minor Upanishad of Hinduism. It is one of the 19 Sannyasa Upanishads, and is one of the 16 Upanishads attached to the Sama Veda.

The text is titled Kundika in surviving Telugu language versions, and notably large parts of it are identical to the Laghu-Sannyasa Upanishad versions found in some parts of India.

The Kundika and Laghu-Sannyasa Upanishads discuss when and how someone may renounce, and the answers it gives are different from those found in other Upanishads such as the Jabala Upanishad. The text dedicates most of its verses to the lifestyle of the renouncer, and its broad theme centers around renunciation or spiritual enlightenment. The text mentions ancient cultural and religious Hindu traditions. It describes renunciation as a stage of life where a man lives like a monk yogi, sleeps on sand and near temples, remain calm and kind no matter what others do to him, while pondering on Vedanta and meditating on Brahman through Om. A renouncer, states the Kundika Upanishad, should seek to realize the identity of his soul with the universal soul.

== Etymology ==
Kundika means "water holder" or "student's water-pot."

== Dating and versions ==
The text is titled Kundika in surviving Telugu language versions, and notably large parts of it are identical to the Laghu-Sannyasa Upanishad versions found in some parts of India. The oldest layer of the text was composed before 3rd century CE, likely in the final centuries of the 1st-millennium BCE.

Text was likely added to it over a long period of time, and numerous recensions were created. The Kundika Upanishad survives in very damaged and corrupted versions, in Telugu and Sanskrit languages, a few with the title Laghu-Sannyasa Upanishad.

The Upanishad, in one version, has 34 verses in a single chapter. In other versions, the text has 28 verses, or 5 to 6 chapters with no verse numbers. The text is a mix of prose and metered poetry.

In the Telugu anthology of 108 Upanishads of the Muktika canon, narrated by Rama to Hanuman, the Kundika Upanishad is listed at number 75.

== Contents ==
The Sannyasi

I am pure consciousness, the witness of all!
I am free from the thought of "I" and "mine"!
I have no lord!

All are myself, and I am all!
I am unique, and I transcend all!
I am my own eternal bliss,
pure undivided consciousness!

—Kundika Upanishad, Chapter 6

The Kundika and Laghu-Sannyasa Upanishads discuss when and how someone may renounce, and the answers it gives are different from those found in other Upanishads such as the Jabala Upanishad. The text dedicates most of its verses to the lifestyle of the renouncer, and its broad theme centers around renunciation or spiritual enlightenment. The text is notable for implying an ancient cultural tradition, that a man should go visit sacred places in his retirement, and take his wife with him. After the travels, he should proceed to renunciation where he lives like a monk yogi, sleeps on sand and near temples, remain calm and kind no matter what others do to him while pondering on Vedanta and meditating on Brahman through Om. He should seek to realize the identity of his soul with the universal soul.

A few manuscript versions of the Upanishad start and end with general invocations, such as of the śānti mantra. (Note: For example, an āpyāyantu, which is an ode to Brahman after its revelation and realization through the study of the Upanishads. Ramanathan translates it as Om! Let my limbs and speech, Prana, eyes, ears, vitality; And all the senses grow in strength. All existence is the Brahman of the Upanishads. May I never deny Brahman, nor Brahman deny me. Let there be no denial at all: Let there be no denial at least from me. May the virtues that are proclaimed in the Upanishads be in me, Who am devoted to the Atman; may they reside in me. Om! Let there be Peace in me! Let there be Peace in my environment! Let there be Peace in the forces that act on me!) (Note: The Ramanathan translation of Kundika and other Samnyasa Upanishads has been reviewed and called "extremely poor and inaccurate" by scholars; see, for example, Olivelle.)

In the first two verses, the Upanishad deals with the Brahmacharya stage, when as a student well-versed in Upanishads, a person graduates to the Grihashthashrama stage of a householder by marrying a suitable girl with the consent of his guru. In the next verses 3 to 6 the Upanishad gives justification for a person to lead the forest dweller or Vanaprastha stage of life. In the remaining 28 verses, starting with discarding the life of forest dweller, the sanyasa stage of life with details on how to renounce and attain self-realization are explained.

=== When can one renounce? ===
The Kundika Upanishad begins with a preface and notable definition. The first two verses mention a student, who used to take delight in Vedic studies with his Guru (teacher) but becomes tired of student life, leaves with his teacher's permission. The Upanishad defines this ex-student an Ashramin, a definition that is different than the typically understood meaning for Ashramin as someone living in an Ashrama (monastic order).

This ex-student, states the text, then marries a woman of equal birth, he deposits the fire, performs a Brahma-sacrifice for a day and night. Both Deussen and Olivelle consider this verse as obscure insertion and possibly corrupted, because neither does it fit with style nor does it follow the Sandhi rules of Sanskrit.

That Ashramin, continues the text, reaches an age when he should retire from leading the household. He should divide his estate among his sons, spend some time in the forest along with his wife. After this comes renunciation. According to Olivelle, these verses suggest the position recommended by Kundika is that the four life stages are to be sequential, with renunciation being the last stage. This position is different than the freedom suggested to anyone in any stage of life, that is recommended in Jabala Upanishad.

The retired, states the text, becomes a hermit and departs from his former routine. He begins wandering in sacred regions, taking his wife with him.

=== The dress and hygiene on the day of initiation ===
On the day of initiation, states Kundika Upanishad, after he renounces the fire, he should silently recite the thirty four verses of Atharvaveda section 11.8.

The renouncer from that day stops shaving the armpits and the pubic hair. He has his face and head shaved, and wears ochre-colored clothing.

He then leaves.

He wanders about homeless. He begs and eats what he receives. He carries a water strainer. He strains the water before he drinks, in order to save the lives of little creatures that live in water, states the Upanishad.

=== Renouncer's lifestyle ===
The third chapter of Upanishad describes the belongings of the renouncer, as follows:

A pot, a drinking cup, a sling, a tripod, a pair of shoes, a patched garment against the cold, a loincloth, a water strainer, a bathing cloth, and an outer garment: an ascetic should avoid anything else other than these.

— Kundika Upanishad, Chapter 3, Translated by Patrick Olivelle

The renouncer's lifestyle is of a wanderer. He begs with a split dry gourd. He sleeps in a temple, or on the sandy banks of a river. He bathes and cleanses himself. He does not rejoice when others praise him. He does not curse when others abuse him. This way of life marks his inner victory over his senses, in his journey of renunciation.

There is, states Deussen, likely corruption of the text with "tripod walking stick" wording requirements because it does not follow the precise meter the rest of the poetic verse does and it is not consistent across manuscript editions.

=== Meditation and yoga for the renouncer ===
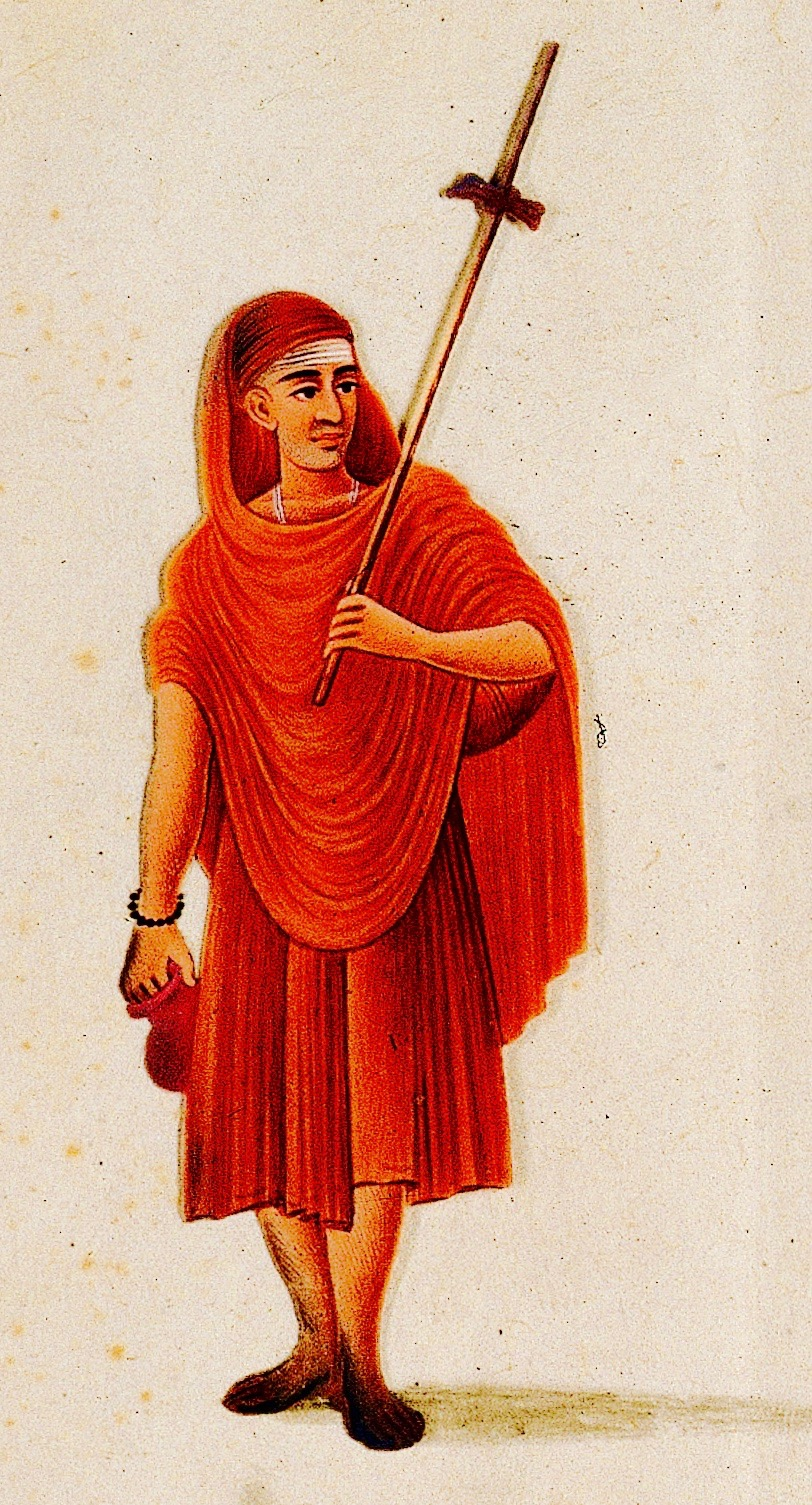
A sannyasi

The Kundika Upanishad asserts in chapter 4, that the Yoga (union) of knowledge occurs in mind, in the mind is perceived space, from space comes wind, from wind comes light, from the light rain the waters, from waters originated the earth, from earth came plants and food, from food is created semen, and from semen originates man. The one who studies, meditates and understands the origins and causes, realizes the Brahman, that which is ageless, immortal, imperishable, indestructible constant.

In chapter 5, the text recommends yoga and breathing exercises for the renouncer, however states Deussen, the verses of this chapter appear altogether corrupted and damaged.

The Laghu-Samnyasa Upanishad ends here, while the Kundika Upanishad continues with one additional chapter.

=== The state of liberated renouncer ===
The last chapter of the text is structured entirely as a poem. This poem has been influential, fragments of it are referenced and appear in Advaita Vedanta texts such as in verses 495–529 of Vivekachudamani attributed to Adi Shankara. The poem describes the state of the liberated renouncer, and its author embeds double meanings mapping and resonating with external and internal realities, the physical and psychological states of man.

The renouncer has realized that his inner state is an ocean of total bliss, but one punctuated by waves that rise and fall because of winds of Maya (changing reality, illusion). He feels that his soul is not limited by his body, just like the sky is not limited by a cloud. He is like a sky, far beyond the reach of time. He is the sun beyond the light, he is the sea without the shore, he is the hill that never changes, he is the Purusha, he is the Narayana, he is the Lord, he is one with them all. He is pure consciousness, he is the witness of all, he is free from selfishness or the thought of mine, he has no lord.

This liberated wise sage, states the Upanishad, feels "all are myself, and I am all", he sees himself alone everywhere, he is blissful, he feels his uniqueness yet transcendence, he does what he wants to do, ever delighting in himself.

== Laghu-Sannyasa and Kundika Upanishads overlap ==
The Laghu-Sannyasa Upanishad attaches an additional chapter before the Kundika Upanishad, and it does not include the last entirely poetic Kundika chapter. Laghu- means small, and this prefix differentiates it from the main Brihat-Sannyasa Upanishad (Brihat- means "great, big").

The first extra chapter attached in the Laghu-Sannyasa text is ritual-focused in contrast to the rest. Its opening sentence, states Patrick Olivelle, does not explicitly state that it is meant for a Brahmin but the style makes it clear that the ritual specified is addressed to a Brahmin on a dying bed, but who has recovered his health. The verses in this extra chapter ask this person, if he resolves to renounce, to first declare his intention to renounce to his friends and family, (Note: Formal Samkalpa, or prior declaration of intent about major life decisions and major life rituals, before loved ones, is a Vedic tradition; see Olivelle) offer oblations to his ancestors, libation on the morning after new moon, then recite hymns from the Vedas, such as verses from section 4.1.1 of Atharvaveda:

Rising victorious above heaven and earth, all yonder worlds;
may Brahman, creator of all, kindly grant everyone prosperity.
In the east at first Brahman was born; Vena revealed him from the radiant summit;
Disclosed his forms, the deepest, the most exalted, womb of the existent and the non-existent.

— Chapter 1 of Laghu-Samnyasa Upanishad (missing from Kundika Upanishad),

Thereafter, the Laghu-Sannyasa text continues to the opening lines of the Kundika Upanishad.

== See also ==
- Aruneya Upanishad
- Jabala Upanishad
- Paramahamsa Upanishad
