= Paramahamsa Parivrajaka Upanishad =

Minor Upanishad of Hinduism

Paramahamsa Parivrajaka
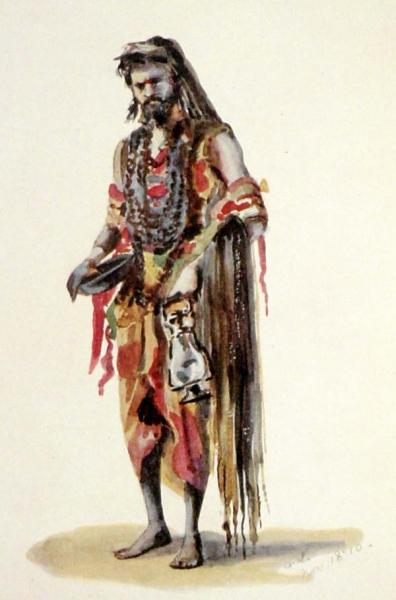
- The text discusses renunciation and the life of wandering ascetic
- Devanagari: परमहम्स परिव्रजक
- Title means: Wandering supreme swan (soul)
- Date: 14th or 15th century CE
- Author(s): Brahma and Adi Narayana
- Type: Sannyasa
- Linked Veda: Atharvaveda
- Chapters: 8
- Philosophy: Vedanta

The Paramahamsa Parivrajaka Upanishad (IAST: Sanskrit: परमहम्स परिव्रजक उपनिस्हद्), is a medieval era Sanskrit text and a minor Upanishad of Hinduism. It is one of the 31 Upanishads attached to the Atharvaveda, and classified as one of the 19 Sannyasa Upanishads.

The text is one of the late additions to the Hindu corpus of Upanishads, dated to the 2nd millennium of the common era, and was probably composed in the 14th or 15th century CE.

The text is notable for mentioning Sannyasa in the context of Varna (classes), and describing ascetics (Hamsas) as wandering birds picking up food wherever they can find it, Paramahamsas (highest ascetics) begging and accepting food and water from all four castes without discrimination, a description similar to one found in Ashrama Upanishad. The text is also notable for the details it provides about the medieval tradition of renunciation in South Asia, and asserting that wandering Hindu mendicant after renunciation is ethical, dedicated to the study of Vedanta, and established in the path of Brahman.

In the Telugu anthology of 108 Upanishads of the Muktika canon, narrated by Rama to Hanuman, this Upanishad is listed at number 66. The text is also known as Paramahamsaparivrajaka Upanishad and Paramahamsaparivrajakopnishad.

== Meaning of the title ==
The literal meaning of Paramahamsa is "supreme swan" and Parivarjaka means "wandering". In Indian tradition, states Paul Deussen, Hamsa (swan) symbolizes the "migrating soul" or reincarnating soul. these words are prefixed to the Upanishad, connoting knowledge about the "wandering supreme soul (swan)".

== Chronology ==
The text is a late addition to the corpus of Upanishads. It was composed after most Sannyasa Upanishads because it refers to them, and is from the 2nd millennium CE, states Sprockhoff. It was probably composed in the 14th or 15th century CE, during the Islamic Sultanate period of Indian subcontinent.

== Structure ==
The Upanishad is presented as a discourse between Brahma – the creator who is called "Grandfather", and Brahma's father Adi Narayana. The text asserts that they have learnt from Adi Narayana about Varna-dharma (classes), Ashrama-dharma (stages of life), and respective duties. Brahma asks Adi Narayana to now teach about the wandering Paramahamsa, who is qualified, wanderer's characteristics, wanderer's state and relationship.

The text is structured into eight prose chapters. It includes fragments of texts from many other Samnyasa Upanishads, as well older non-Vedic and Vedic texts. Many of the ideas found in this text repeat those found in Upanishads composed earlier.

== Contents ==
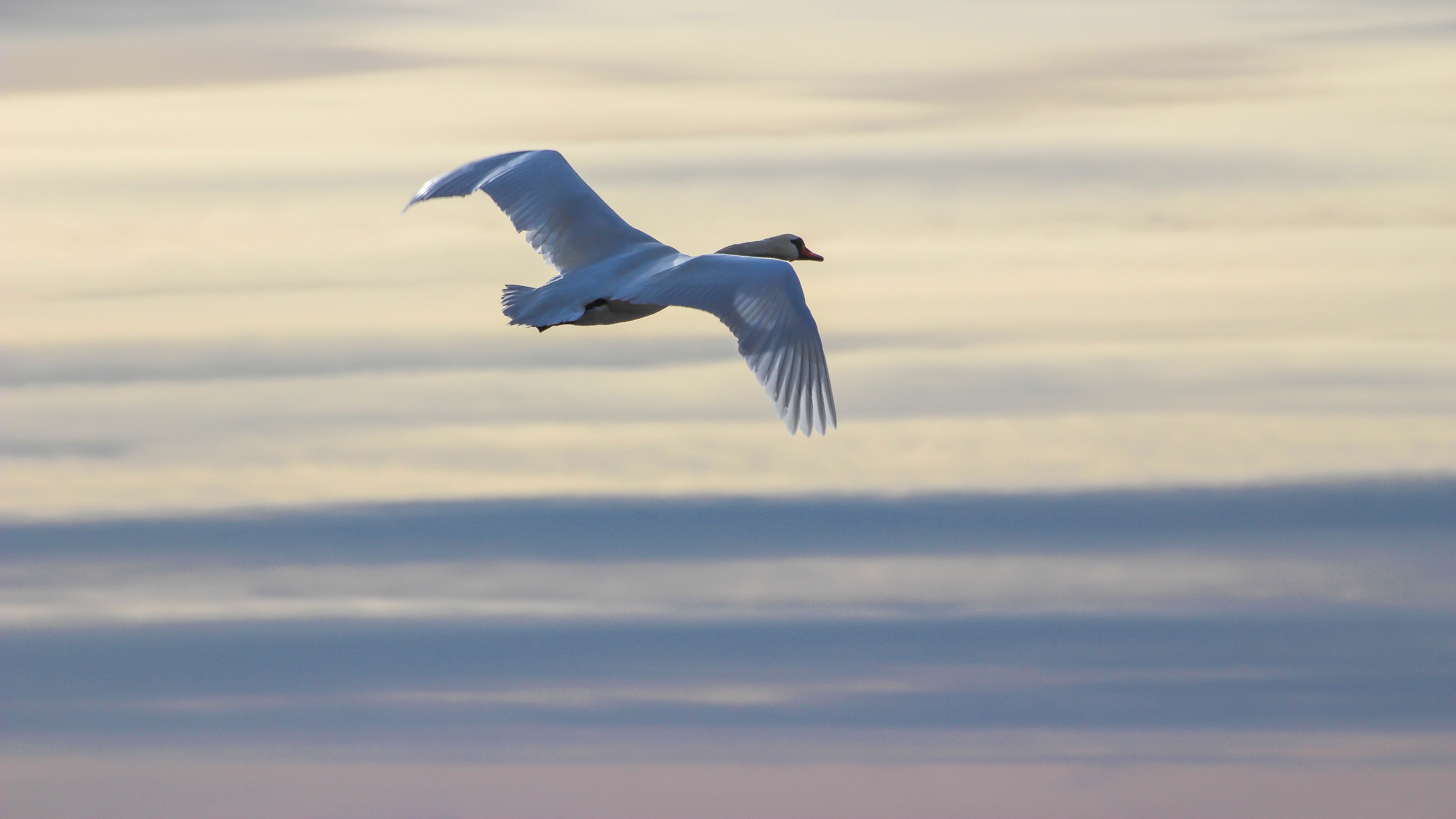
The phrase "Paramahamsa Parivrajaka" means "wandering highest Hamsa (swan, goose)".

=== When to renounce ===
Man begins his adult life with three longings (son, wealth and heavenly world), asserts the text, and to pursue these he resorts to selfishness, egotism and other latent impulses. With time, wisdom dawns on him, and he seeks meaning and liberation. This is the time to renounce. Like, Jabala Upanishad, the Paramahamsa Parivrajaka Upanishad asserts that anyone can renounce, at any time, either after sequentially completing studentship, householder life and retirement, or directly after Vedic studies, or from household life, or retirement, married or never married. He must feel disgust or detachment from the ways of the world, state the text, and feel the human longing for a way for total and permanent happiness. Once this detachment is in him, he should renounce and seek the life of wandering Hamsa.

The Upanishad adds that the renouncer should inform his family and friends, declare his intent, persuade and obtain cheerful approval of his father, mother, wife, son, relatives, and those who live immediately next to him. If he is a teacher, states the text, he should also get the cheerful consent of his pupils.

=== How to renounce ===
The Upanishad states in chapter 2 that while some people do Prajapati rituals before commencing on renunciation, they should not. Instead, they should remember and make oblations to the fire of vital breath and three elements (Sattva (goodness), Rajas (energy) and Tamas (darkness)).

The text then repeats the teachings of Jabala Upanishad, with the change that anyone who wants to renounce should get the sacred fire from his village, or from a Brahmin for the offering. The seeker of renunciation then inhales from this fire (Agni) while reciting the following hymn:

'Oh Fire, this (vital breath) is your source; as you are born at the proper time (of the year) you put on effulgence. Knowing him (the Atman, your ultimate source) may you merge (with the Prana, your source). May you increase our wealth (of transcendent knowledge)'. So reciting the mantra he shall smell the fire. This is the source of fire, the vital air. May you go to the Prana, may you go to your source. Svaha.

Alternatively, he may do this without the fire obtained from his village or Brahmin, and just use water, or just do it mentally or orally with "I renounce" if he feels he is in mortal danger. After that, he may go into war and die as a hero, or stop eating, or drown, or enter a fire, or proceed on the great journey. He can also proceed instead on the path of the Paramhamsa.

For a life of a Hamsa monk, states the text, he should renounce by remembering the Om, cutting his topknot tuft of hair, cutting the sacred thread he wears, throw all this into the water before him, undress and say, "Om, I have renounced, I have renounced, I have renounced, Om!". Then he must say, "I give safety to all beings! Svaha!". Thereafter, he leaves, heading towards north, remembering "Om, I am Brahman, Om Tat tvam asi". This method is repeated, for a different context, in chapter 4 of the text. The renouncer then wears an old garment, or bark and antelope skin and proceeds on the journey of renunciation.

=== Taking leave from the family ===
The renouncer gets together with wife, son and family, then offer the Shraddha oblation to himself in front of them, states the text. (Note: The Shraddha oblation is an oblation of the children to dead ancestors in Hindu tradition.) Then he turns towards his children, if he is a teacher towards his students, if he has no children or students then himself. He announces that he is giving away his Vedic and secular abilities to them, as well as his fourteen faculties, and everything he possesses. Then, states the text, he declares to them, "You are Brahma! You are the sacrifice!" and then he leaves everything, leaves everyone, and parts company.

=== What the renouncer does ===
Sannyasi ethics

He is truthful. He is celibate. He is non-possessive. He is non-violent.
He forsakes anger, greed, delusion, conceit, deceit and arrogance.
He forsakes indignation, pride, impatience, hate, selfishness and the like.

— Paramahamsa Parivrajaka Upanishad Chapter 4

The Upanishad dedicates the largest portion of its text describing the characteristics of the wandering Paramahamsa.

The wandering Paramahamsa, states the text, studies Vedanta and is established in the path of Brahman. He recites Om, he is selfless yet fixed in his Self (soul). He is of pure mind, detached, learning always. He is, asserts the text, always reflecting on the meaning of the Upanishads. He has no attachments to anything, internal or external. No enmity crosses his mind, he begs food from all classes (varna), he is happy if he finds something to eat and he is equally happy if he does not. His hand is his begging bowl, he looks lean, he wanders alone for eight months, asserts the text, stays at one place during the monsoons. He always sleeps on the ground, he does not shave, he avoids cities, he avoids women, he looks always distant and concealed, he meditates states chapter 5 of the text.

Chapter 6 describes the nature of Om sound praising it to be the same as Brahman, while chapter 7 states that man does not need rituals or external religious symbols if his mind, translates Patrick Olivelle, is set on the "non-dual knowledge of self". That knowledge is his sacred string, meditation is his topknot tuft of hair, the inner journey is his purificatory ritual and ring. (Note: The purificatory ring is a ring made from a type of long grass and worn on the fourth finger, during certain rituals and rites of passage in Hindu traditions.)

The Paramahamsa wanderer is rare, asserts the Upanishad. He is the man of the Vedas, whose mind is one with Brahman, he is always satisfied with whatever he gets, neither respect nor disrespect bothers him, nor do pleasure or sorrow. He does not pay homage to anything or anyone, nor does he expect homage from anything or anyone.

The nature of Paramahamsa Parivrajaka

(...) He endures rebuke, wrath and mockery. He makes no distinction between the superior and the inferior, he does not perceive anything as different from himself.

— Paramahamsa Parivrajaka Upanishad, Chapter 8

He does not utter Svaha, he is not occupied with mantras nor tantric rites. Gods are not the subject of his meditation. The wandering Paramahamsa is, translates Olivelle, "a mass of non-dual consciousness characterized by being, consciousness and bliss".
