= Shatyayaniya Upanishad =

Minor Upanishad of Hinduism

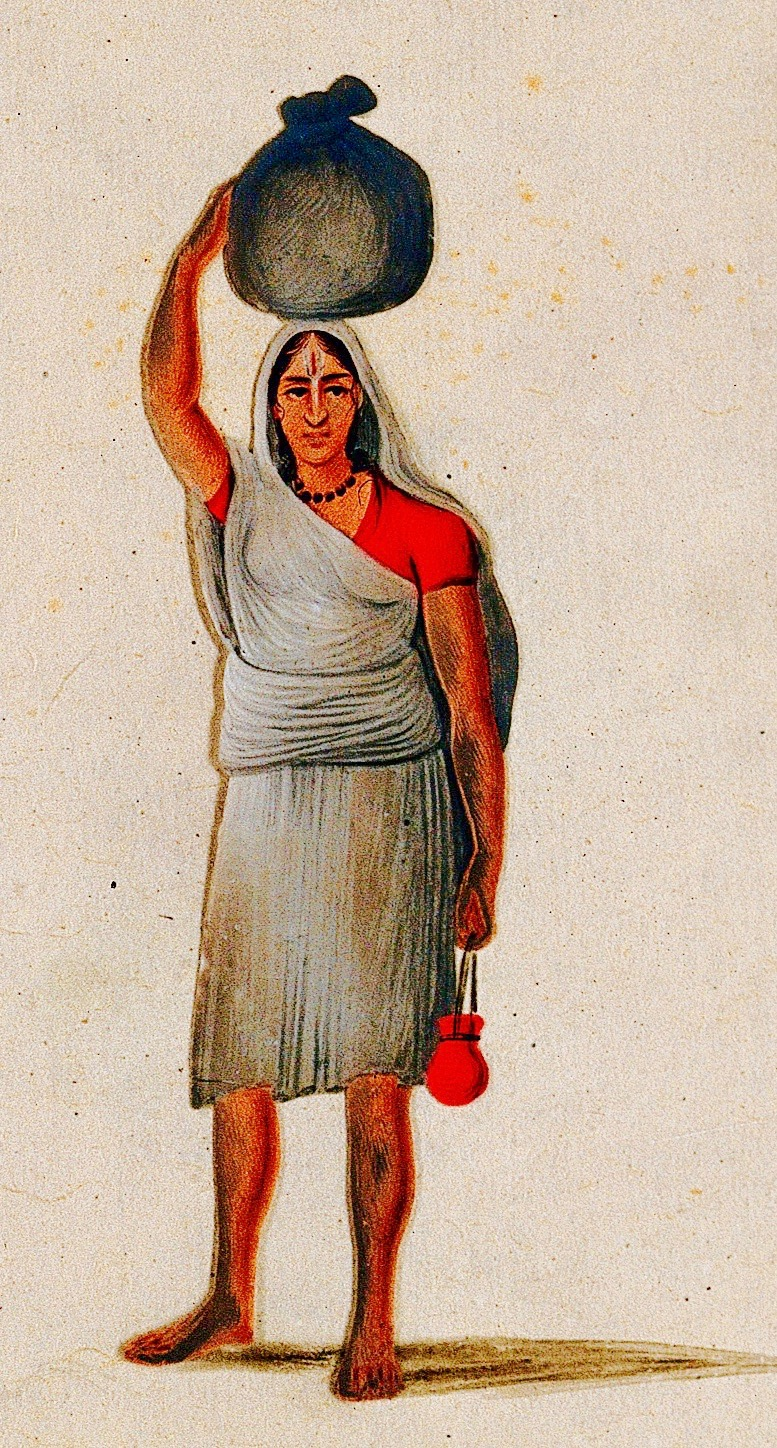
- The text discusses the monk tradition in Vaishnava tradition
- Devanagari: शाट्यायनीय
- IAST: Śāṭyāyanīya
- Title means: Named after a Vedic school
- Date: ~1200 CE
- Type: Sannyasa
- Linked Veda: Yajurveda
- Chapters: 1
- Philosophy: Vaishnavism

The Shatyayaniya Upanishad (Sanskrit: शाट्यायनीय उपनिषत्, IAST: Śāṭyāyanīya Upaniṣad) is a Sanskrit text, composed about the start of 13th-century, and is one of the minor Upanishads of Hinduism. The text is attached to the Shukla Yajurveda, and is one of the 20 Sannyasa (renunciation) Upanishads.

The Shatyayaniya Upanishad is a significant exception in the collection of ancient and medieval Sannyasa Upanishads, most of which are premised on the Advaita Vedanta philosophy. Shatyayaniya is premised on and presents renunciation from Vaishnavism philosophy perspective. However, all Sannyasa texts including the Shatyayaniya Upanishad emphasize nondualism, same renunciation rites and outlook, the use of yoga, meditation on Om and Brahman as the ultimate reality, pursuit of living liberation, a virtuous simple life that journeys towards and with self-knowledge, with Shatyayaniya calling Vishnu as the "very self, and into whom the renouncers enter, liberated".

The Shatyayaniya text extensively references and includes hymn fragments from the Vedas and ancient Principal Upanishads of Hinduism. It opens, for example, with verses from section 6.34 of the Maitri Upanishad, stating "the mind alone is the cause of people's bondage" and suffering, and the mind alone is also the cause of their liberation. It is the mind of man that is the eternal mystery and one that shapes his future course, states its third verse, again referencing the Vedic literature. To know the highest eternal truth one must know the Brahman, which is Vasudeva – the striding Vishnu, states the text.

Conduct prescribed for Hindu monk

Overcoming lust, anger, greed, delusion, deceit, arrogance, envy, egotism, conceit and the like, shunning honor and dishonor, praise and blame, let him stand like a tree and when hacked, not utter a word. Those who know this become immortal in this very world. That has been declared in these Vedic verses: (...)

— Shatyayaniya Upanishad (Tr: Patrick Olivelle)

The Shatyayaniya Upanishad, like other Sannyasa Upanishads, lists ethics as essential to freedom and liberation in this life. It lists never injuring any creature by word, thought or deeds, never getting angry, being devoid of delusion and deceit, abandonment of arrogance and envy, never being conceited and egotistic, never even uttering a word even if one is abused or physically attacked or verbally dishonored, abiding in a state of calmness, being without desires, tranquility in one's behavior, treating everyone as equal, and persistent devotion to learning. The monk should diligently study the Vedas and ponder on the meaning of the Upanishads, asserts the text, he should meditate on Om, and consider knowledge as the best ritual, the best dress, the best wealth. He should beg or accept food that is just enough to sustain his life, but not more. He should neither fear anyone, not be cause of fear to anyone.

There are minor differences between Shatyayaniya and other Sannyasa Upanishads. The Shatyayaniya states that the monk should shave his head between seasons and he need not shave his topknot. During the monsoon season, asserts the text, when the Inner Self (Vishnu) is asleep, the monk need not shave his head and he should suspend wandering from place to place. In other months, he should travel while reflecting on Vishnu, sleep in temples, fire halls of towns, in caves and solitary abandoned places. This is the highest Vaishnava state, states the text, and the monk should never abandon this state, as the patient journey of monk life leads him to becoming a master of himself, attaining the highest Brahman, Vishnu.

The text identifies four types of (Vaishnava) renouncers – Kuticaka, Bahudaka, Hamsa and Paramahamsa. All of them carry a symbol or sign of Vishnu, internally through their virtuous conduct, and externally as an emblem that is a reminder. All pursue the study of Vedanta philosophy. However, unlike other Sannyasa Upanishads which suggest gradual abandonment of all emblematic articles, the Shatyayaniya Upanishad asserts that all four renouncers carry the emblem of Vishnu, but the lifestyle – such as how they find food for survival – for these four types of Vaishnava monks is different.

The date or author of Shatyayaniya Upanishad is unknown, but given its literary style and the texts it references, it is likely a medieval era text. Olivelle and Sprockhoff date it around 1200 CE.

Manuscripts of this text are also found titled as Shatyayani Upanishad and Satyayaniyopanisad. In the Telugu language anthology of 108 Upanishads of the Muktika canon, narrated by Rama to Hanuman, it is listed at number 99.

== See also ==
- Aruni Upanishad
- Jabala Upanishad
- Nirvana Upanishad
- Parabrahma Upanishad
