= Sannyasa =

Renounce worldly life, monastic spiritual pursuit in Hinduism

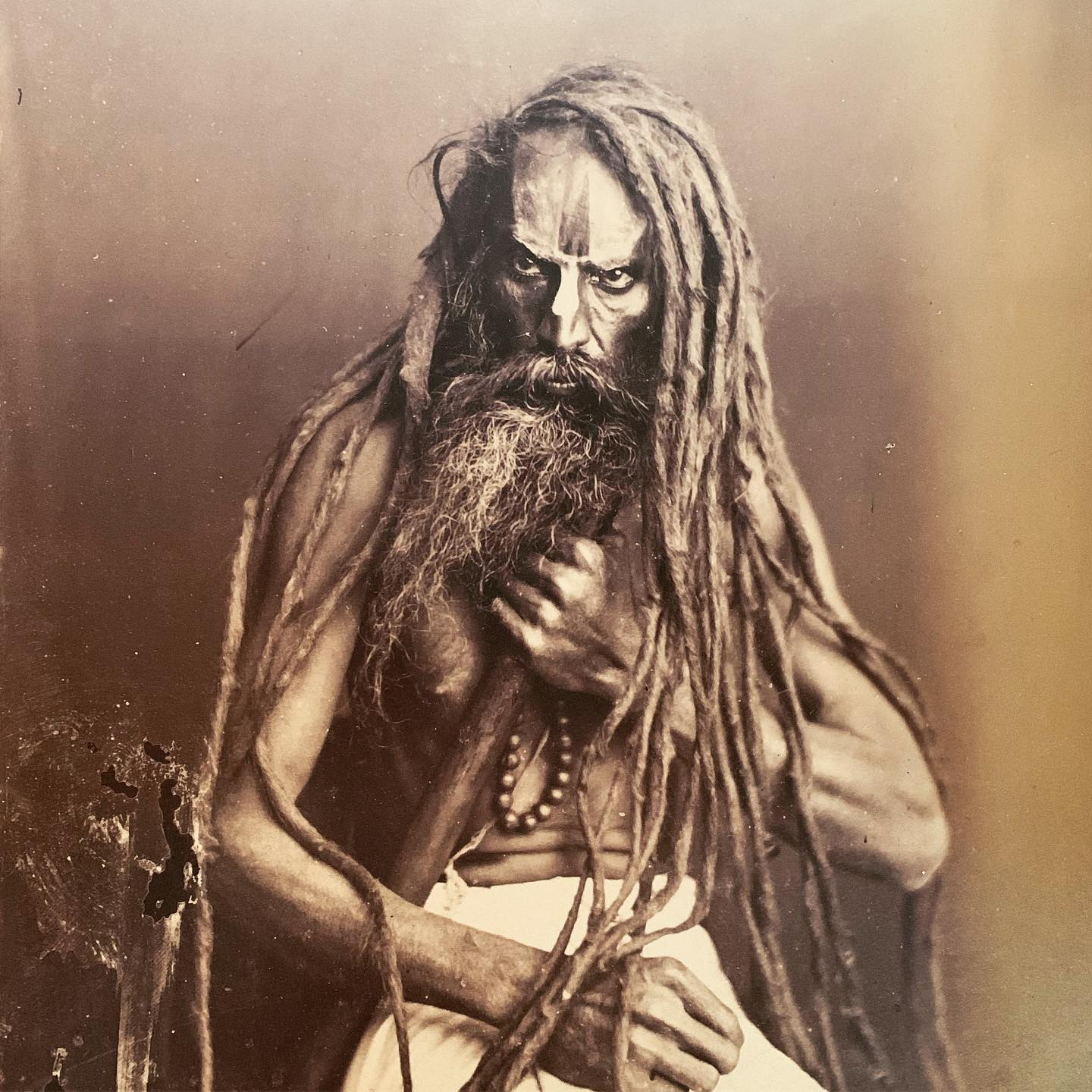
Photograph of a Sanyasi ascetic, albumen print, by Captain W. W. Hooper & Surgeon G. Western, Hyderabad, c. 1865

Sannyasa (Sanskrit: संन्यास, romanized: saṃnyāsa), sometimes spelled sanyasa, is the fourth stage within the Hindu system of four life stages known as ashramas, the first three being brahmacharya (celibate student), grihastha (householder) and vanaprastha (forest dweller, retired). Sannyasa is traditionally conceptualized for men or women in the last years of their lives, but young brahmacharis have the choice to skip the householder and retirement stages, renounce worldly and materialistic pursuits and dedicate their lives to spiritual pursuits.

Sannyasa, a form of asceticism marked by renunciation of material desires and prejudices, is characterized by a state of disinterest in and detachment from material life, with the purpose of spending one's life in peaceful, spiritual pursuits. An individual in Sanyasa is known as a sannyasi (male) or sannyasini (female) in Hinduism. (Note: An alternative term for either is sannyasin.) Sannyasa shares similarities with the Sadhu and Sadhvi traditions of Jain monasticism, and the sannyasi and sannyasini share similarity with the bhikkhus and bhikkhunis of Buddhism.

Sannyasa has historically been a stage of renunciation, ahimsa (non-violence), a peaceful and simple life and spiritual pursuit in Indian traditions. However, this has not always been the case. After the invasions and establishment of Muslim rule in India, from the 12th century through the British Raj, parts of the Shaiva (Gossain) and Vaishnava (Bairagi) ascetics metamorphosed into a military order, where they developed martial arts, created military strategies, and engaged in guerrilla warfare. These warrior sanyasi (ascetics) played an important role in helping European colonial powers establish themselves in the Indian subcontinent.

== Etymology and synonyms ==
Saṃnyāsa: in Sanskrit nyasa means 'purification', sannyasa means "Purification of Everything". It is a composite word of saṃ- which means "together, all", ni- which means "down" and āsa from the root as, meaning "to throw" or "to put". A literal translation of Sannyāsa is thus "to put down everything, all of it". Sannyasa is sometimes spelled as Sanyasa.

The term Saṃnyasa makes appearance in the Samhitas, Aranyakas, and Brahmanas, the earliest layers of Vedic literature (2nd millennium BCE), but it is rare. It is not found in ancient Buddhist or Jaina vocabularies, and only appears in Hindu texts of the 1st millennium BCE, in the context of those who have given up ritual activity and taken up non-ritualistic spiritual pursuits discussed in the Upanishads. The term Sannyasa evolves into a rite of renunciation in ancient Sutra texts, and thereafter became a recognized, well discussed stage of life (Ashrama) by about the 3rd and 4th century CE.

Sanyasis are also known as Bhiksu, Pravrajita/Pravrajitā, Yati, Sramana and Parivrajaka in Hindu texts.

== History ==
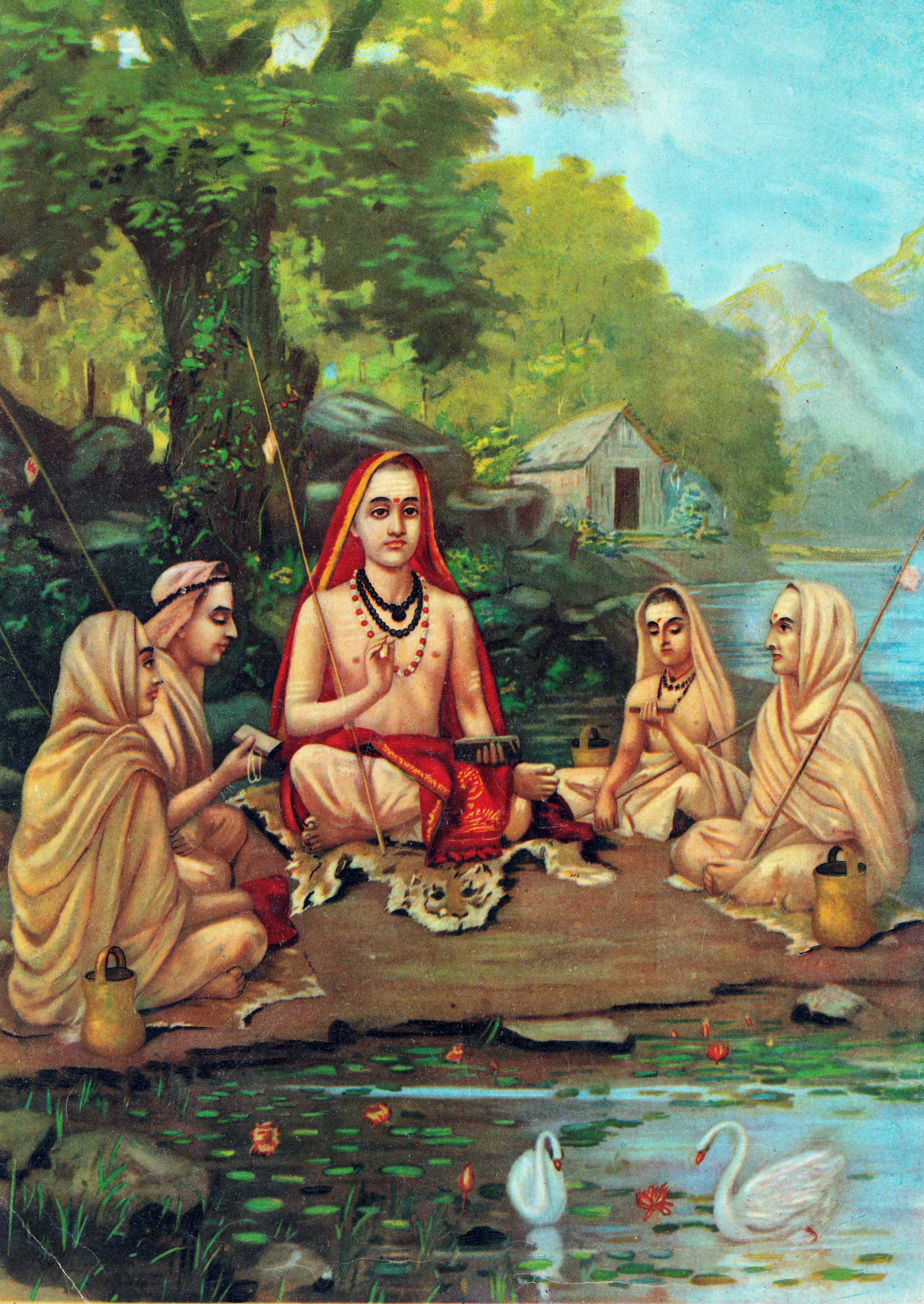
Adi Shankara, founder of Advaita Vedanta, with disciples, by Raja Ravi Varma (1904)

Jamison and Witzel state that early Vedic texts make no mention of Sannyasa, or the Ashrama system, unlike the concepts of Brahmacharin and Grihastha which they do mention. Instead, the Rig Veda uses the term Antigriha (अन्तिगृह) in hymn 10.95.4, as still a part of the extended family, where older people lived in ancient India, with an outwardly role. It was during the later Vedic era and over time, that Sannyasa and other new concepts emerged, while older ideas evolved and expanded. A three-stage Ashrama concept, along with Vanaprastha, emerged around or after 7th century BC, when sages such as Yājñavalkya left their homes and roamed around as spiritual recluses and pursued their Pravrajika (wanderer) lifestyle. The explicit use of the four-stage Ashrama concept appeared a few centuries later.

However, early Vedic literature from 2nd millennium BC mentions Muni (मुनि, monks, mendicants, holy men), whose characteristics mirror those found in later Sannyasins and Sannyasinis. For example, the Rig Veda, in Book 10 Chapter 136, mentions Munis as those with Kesin (केशिन्, long haired) and Mala clothes (मल, soil-colored, yellow, orange, or saffron), engaged in the affairs of Mananat (mind, meditation). The Rigveda, however, refers to these people as Muni and Vati (वति, monks who beg).

केश्यग्निं केशी विषं केशी बिभर्ति रोदसी । केशी विश्वं स्वर्दृशे केशीदं ज्योतिरुच्यते ॥१॥ मुनयो वातरशनाः पिशङ्गा वसते मला । वातस्यानु ध्राजिं यन्ति यद्देवासो अविक्षत ॥२॥

He with the long loose locks (of hair) supports Agni, and moisture, heaven, and earth; He is all sky to look upon: he with long hair is called this light. The Munis, girdled with the wind, wear garments of soil hue; They, following the wind's swift course, go where the Gods have gone before.

— Rig Veda, Hymn 10.CXXXVI.1-2

These Munis, their lifestyles and spiritual pursuits, likely influenced the Sannyasa concept, as well as the ideas behind the ancient concept of Brahmacharya (bachelor student). One class of Munis were associated with Rudra. Another class were Vratyas.

== Lifestyle and goals ==
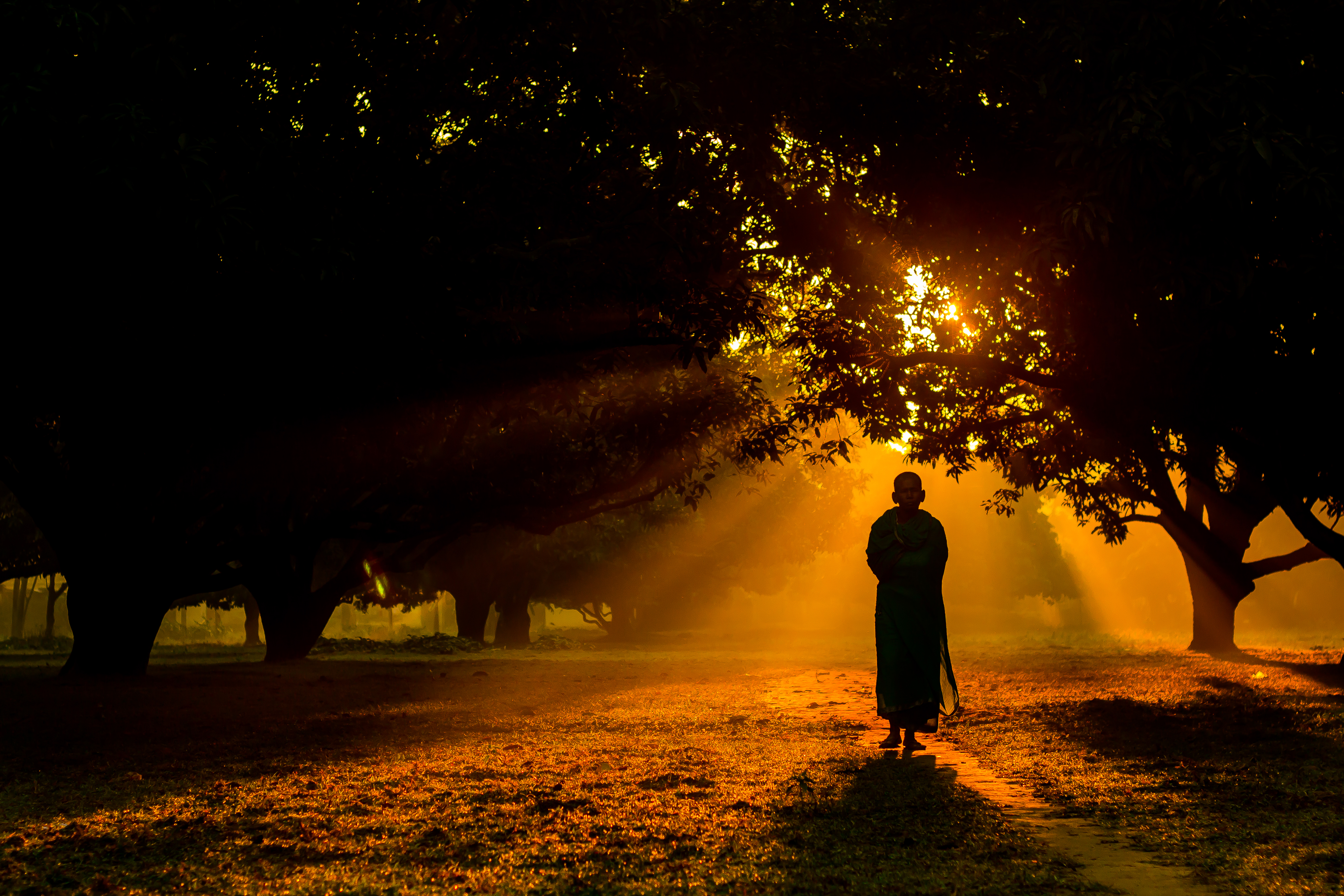
A Hindu monk walking during sunrise in a mango garden in Dinajpur, Bangladesh

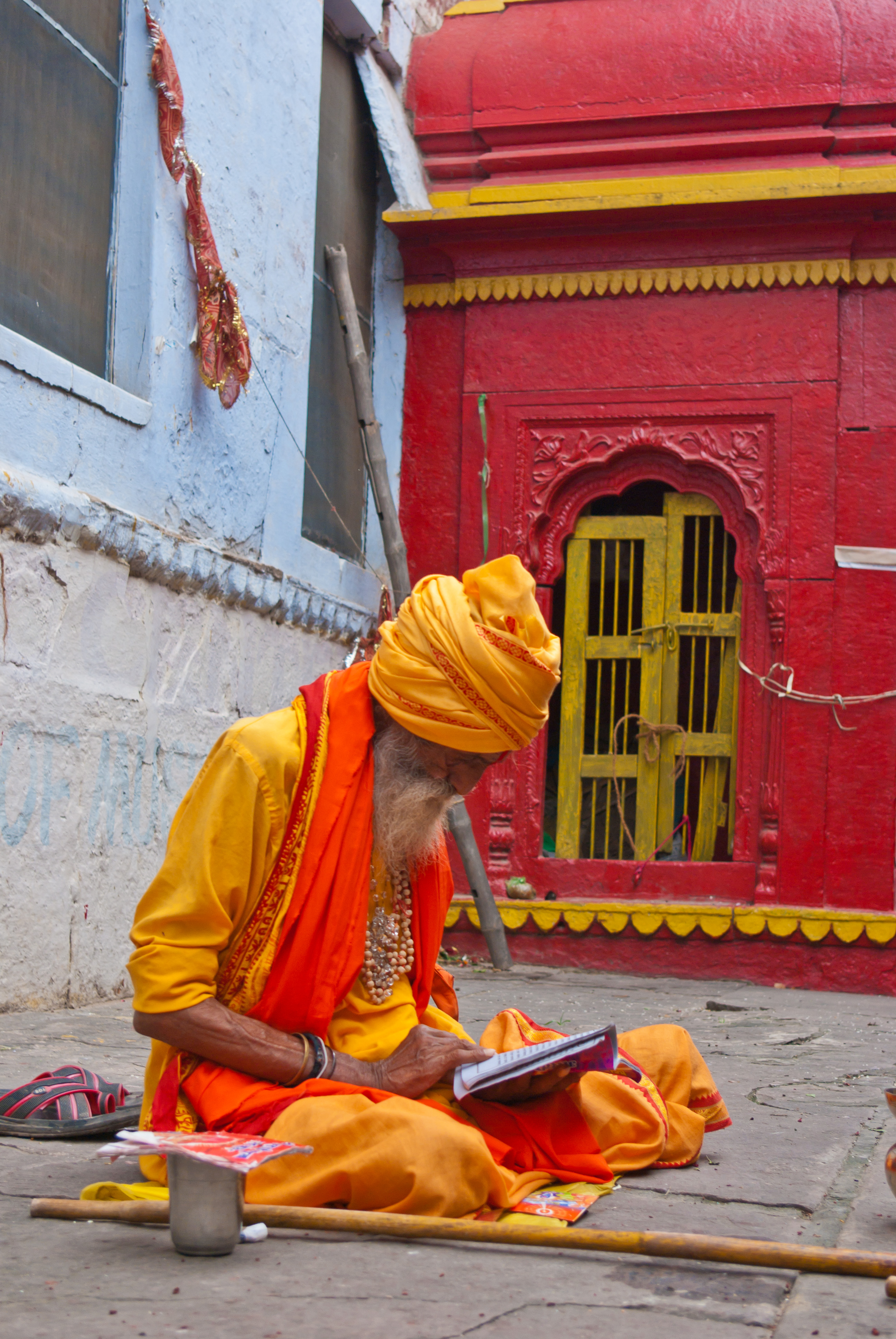
A Hindu Sannyasi. In ancient and medieval literature, they are usually associated with forests and remote hermitages in their spiritual, literary and philosophical pursuits.

Hinduism has no formal demands or requirements regarding the lifestyle or spiritual discipline, method or deity that a Sanyasin or Sanyasini must pursue – these are left to the choice and preferences of the individual. This freedom has led to diversity and significant differences in the lifestyle and goals of those who adopt Sannyasa. There are, however, some common themes. A person who enters Sannyasa lives a simple life, typically detached, itinerant, drifting from place to place, with no material possessions or emotional attachments. They may have a walking stick, a book, and a container or vessel for food and drink, and often wear yellow, saffron, orange, ochre or soil-colored clothes. They may have long hair and appear disheveled, and are usually vegetarians. Some minor Upanishads as well as monastic orders consider women, children, students, fallen men (those with a criminal record) and others as ineligible to become Sannyasins; while other texts place no restrictions. The dress, the equipage and lifestyle varies between groups. For example, the Sannyasa Upanishad in verses 2.23 to 2.29, identifies six lifestyles for six types of renunciates. One of them is described as living with the following possessions,

Pot, drinking cup and flask – the three supports, a pair of shoes,
a patched robe giving protection – in heat and cold, a loin cloth,
bathing drawers and straining cloth, triple staff and coverlet.

— Sannyasa Upanishad, 1.4

Those who enter Sannyasa may choose whether to join a group (similar to Christian mendicant orders). Some are anchorites, homeless mendicants who prefer solitude and seclusion in remote parts, without affiliation. Others are cenobites, living and traveling with kindred fellow-Sannyasi in the pursuit of their spiritual journey, sometimes in Ashramas or Matha/Sangha (a Hermitage, the practice of seclusion known generally as monasticism).

Most Hindu ascetics adopt celibacy when they begin Sannyasa. However, there are exceptions, such as the Saiva Tantra school of asceticism where ritual sex is considered part of the liberation process. Sex is viewed by them as a transcendence from a personal, intimate act to something impersonal and ascetic.

=== The goal ===
The goal of the Hindu Sannyasin is moksha (liberation). The idea of what that means varies from tradition to tradition.

Who am I, and in what really do I consist? What is this cage of suffering?

— Jayakhya Samhita, Verse 5.7

For the Bhakti (devotion) traditions, liberation consists of being an eternal servant to the Divine and release from Saṃsāra (rebirth in future life); for Yoga traditions, liberation is the experience of the highest Samādhi (deep awareness in this life); and for the Advaita tradition, liberation is jivanmukti – the awareness of the Supreme Reality (Brahman) and Self-realization in this life. Sannyasa is a means and an end in itself. It is a means to decreasing and then ultimately ending all ties of any kind. It is a means to the soul and meaning, but not ego nor personalities. Sannyasa does not abandon the society, it abandons the ritual mores of the social world and one's attachment to all its other manifestations. The end is a liberated, content, free and blissful existence.

=== The behaviors and characteristics ===
The behavioral state of a person in Sannyasa is described by many ancient and medieval era Indian texts. Bhagavad Gita discusses it in many verses, for example:

ज्ञेयः स नित्यसंन्यासी यो न द्वेष्टि न काङ् क्षति । निर्द्वन्द्वो हि महाबाहो सुखं बन्धात्प्रमुच्यते ॥५-३॥

He is known as a permanent Sannyasin who does not hate, does not desire, is without dualities (opposites). Truly, Mahabaho (Arjuna), he is liberated from bondage.

— Bhagavad Gita, Hymn 5.3

Other behavioral characteristics, in addition to renunciation, during Sannyasa include: ahimsa (non-violence), akrodha (not become angry even if you are abused by others), disarmament (no weapons), chastity, bachelorhood (no marriage), avyati (non-desirous), amati (poverty), self-restraint, truthfulness, sarvabhutahita (kindness to all creatures), asteya (non-stealing), aparigraha (non-acceptance of gifts, non-possessiveness) and shaucha (purity of body, speech and mind). Some Hindu monastic orders require the above behavior in form of a vow, before a renunciate can enter the order. Tiwari notes that these virtues are not unique to Sannyasa, and other than renunciation, all of these virtues are revered in ancient texts for all four Ashrama (stage) of human life.

Baudhayana Dharmasūtra, completed by about 7th century BC, states the following behavioral vows for a person in Sannyasa

These are the vows a Sannyasi must keep –

Abstention from injuring living beings, truthfulness, abstention from appropriating the property of others, abstention from sex, liberality (kindness, gentleness) are the major vows. There are five minor vows: abstention from anger, obedience towards the guru, avoidance of rashness, cleanliness, and purity in eating. He should beg (for food) without annoying others, any food he gets he must compassionately share a portion with other living beings, sprinkling the remainder with water he should eat it as if it were a medicine.

— Baudhayana, Dharmasūtra, II.10.18.1-10

=== Types ===
Ashrama Upanishad identified various types of Sannyasi renouncers based on their different goals: Kutichaka – seeking atmospheric world; Bahudaka – seeking heavenly world; Hamsa – seeking penance world; Paramahamsa – seeking truth world; and Turiyatitas and Avadhutas seeking liberation in this life.

In some texts, such as Sannyasa Upanishad, these were classified by the symbolic items the Sannyasins carried and their lifestyle. For example, Kutichaka sannyasis carried triple staffs, Hamsa sannyasis carried single staffs, while Paramahamsas went without them. This method of classification based on emblematic items became controversial, as anti-thematic to the idea of renunciation. Later texts, such as Naradaparivrajaka Upanishad stated that all renunciation is one, but people enter the state of Sannyasa for different reasons – for detachment and getting away from their routine meaningless world, to seek knowledge and meaning in life, to honor rites of Sannyasa they have undertaken, and because he already has liberating knowledge.

Other classifications

There were many groups of Hindu, Jain and Buddhist Sannyasis co-existing in pre-Maurya Empire era, each classified by their attributes, such as: Achelakas (Śvetāmbara Jainas without clothes), Ajivika, Aviruddhaka, Devadhammika, Eka-satakas (Śvetāmbara Jainas with 1 cloth), Gotamaka, Jatilaka, Magandika, Mundasavaka, Nigrantha (Śvetāmbara Jainas), Paribbajaka, Tedandikas, Titthiya, Santrottar (Śvetāmbara Jainas with 2 or more clothes) and others.

== Literature ==
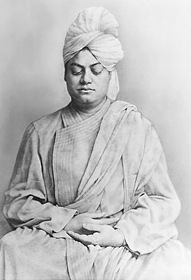
Swami Vivekananda (1894) was a sannyasi.

The Dharmasūtras and Dharmaśāstras, composed about mid 1st millennium BC and later, place increasing emphasis on all four stages of Ashrama system including Sannyasa. The Baudhayana Dharmasūtra, in verses 2.11.9 to 2.11.12, describes the four Ashramas as "a fourfold division of Dharma". The newer Dharmaśāstra vary widely in their discussion of Ashrama system.

The Dharmasūtras and Dharmaśāstras give a number of detailed but widely divergent guidelines on renunciation. In all cases, Sannyasa was never mandatory and was one of the choices before an individual. Only a small percentage chose this path. Olivelle posits that the older Dharmasūtras present the Ashramas including Sannyasa as four alternative ways of life and options available, but not as sequential stage that any individual must follow. Olivelle also states that Sannyasa along with the Ashrama system gained mainstream scholarly acceptance about 2nd century BC.

Ancient and medieval era texts of Hinduism consider Grihastha (householder) stage as the most important of all stages in sociological context, as human beings in this stage not only pursue a virtuous life, they produce food and wealth that sustains people in other stages of life, as well as the offspring that continues mankind. However, an individual had the choice to renounce any time he or she wanted, including straight after student life.

=== When can a person renounce? ===
Baudhayana Dharmasūtra, in verse II.10.17.2 states that anyone who has finished Brahmacharya (student) life stage may become ascetic immediately, in II.10.17.3 that any childless couple may enter Sannyasa anytime they wish, while verse II.10.17.4 states that a widower may choose Sannyasa if desired, but in general, states verse II.10.17.5, Sannyasa is suited after the completion of age 70 and after one's children have been firmly settled. Other texts suggest the age of 75.

The Vasiṣṭha and Āpastamba Dharmasūtras, and the later Manusmṛti describe the āśramas as sequential stages which would allow one to pass from Vedic studentship to householder to forest-dwelling hermit to renouncer. However, these texts differ with each other. Yājñavalkya Smṛti, for example, differs from Manusmṛti and states in verse 3.56 that one may skip Vanaprastha (forest dwelling, retired) stage and go straight from the Grihastha (householder) stage to Sannyasa.

=== Who may renounce? ===
The Jabala Upanishad mentions one who gets vairagya of any class or gender can renounce or take sanyasa. Nevertheless, Dharmaśāstra texts document people of all castes as well as women, entered Sannyasa in practice.

=== What happened to renouncers' property and human rights? ===
After renouncing the world, the ascetic's financial obligations and property were adjudicated by the state, in the manner of a decedent's estate. Viṣṇu Smriti in verse 6.27, for example, states that if a debtor takes Sannyasa, his sons or grandsons should settle his debts. As to the little property a Sannyasin may collect or possess after renunciation, Book III Chapter XVI of Kautiliya's Arthashastra states that the property of hermits (vánaprastha), ascetics (yati, sannyasa), and student bachelors (Brahmachári) shall on their death be taken by their guru, disciples, their dharmabhratri (brother in the monastic order), or classmates in succession.

Although a renouncer's practitioner's obligations and property rights were reassigned, he or she continued to enjoy basic human rights such as the protection from injury by others and the freedom to travel. Likewise, someone practicing Sannyasa was subject to the same laws as common citizens; stealing, harming, or killing a human being by a Sannyasi were all serious crimes in Kautiliya's Arthashastra.

=== Renunciation in daily life ===
Later Indian literature debates whether the benefit of renunciation can be achieved (moksha, or liberation) without asceticism in the earlier stages of one's life. For example, Bhagavad Gita, Vidyaranya's Jivanmukti Viveka, and others believed that various alternate forms of yoga and the importance of yogic discipline could serve as paths to spirituality, and ultimately moksha. Over time, four paths to liberating spirituality have emerged in Hinduism: Jñāna yoga, Bhakti yoga, Karma yoga and Rāja yoga. Acting without greed or craving for results, in Karma yoga for example, is considered a form of detachment in daily life similar to Sannyasa. Sharma states that, "the basic principle of Karma yoga is that it is not what one does, but how one does it that counts and if one has the know-how in this sense, one can become liberated by doing whatever it is one does", and "(one must do) whatever one does without attachment to the results, with efficiency and to the best of one's ability".

== Warrior ascetics ==
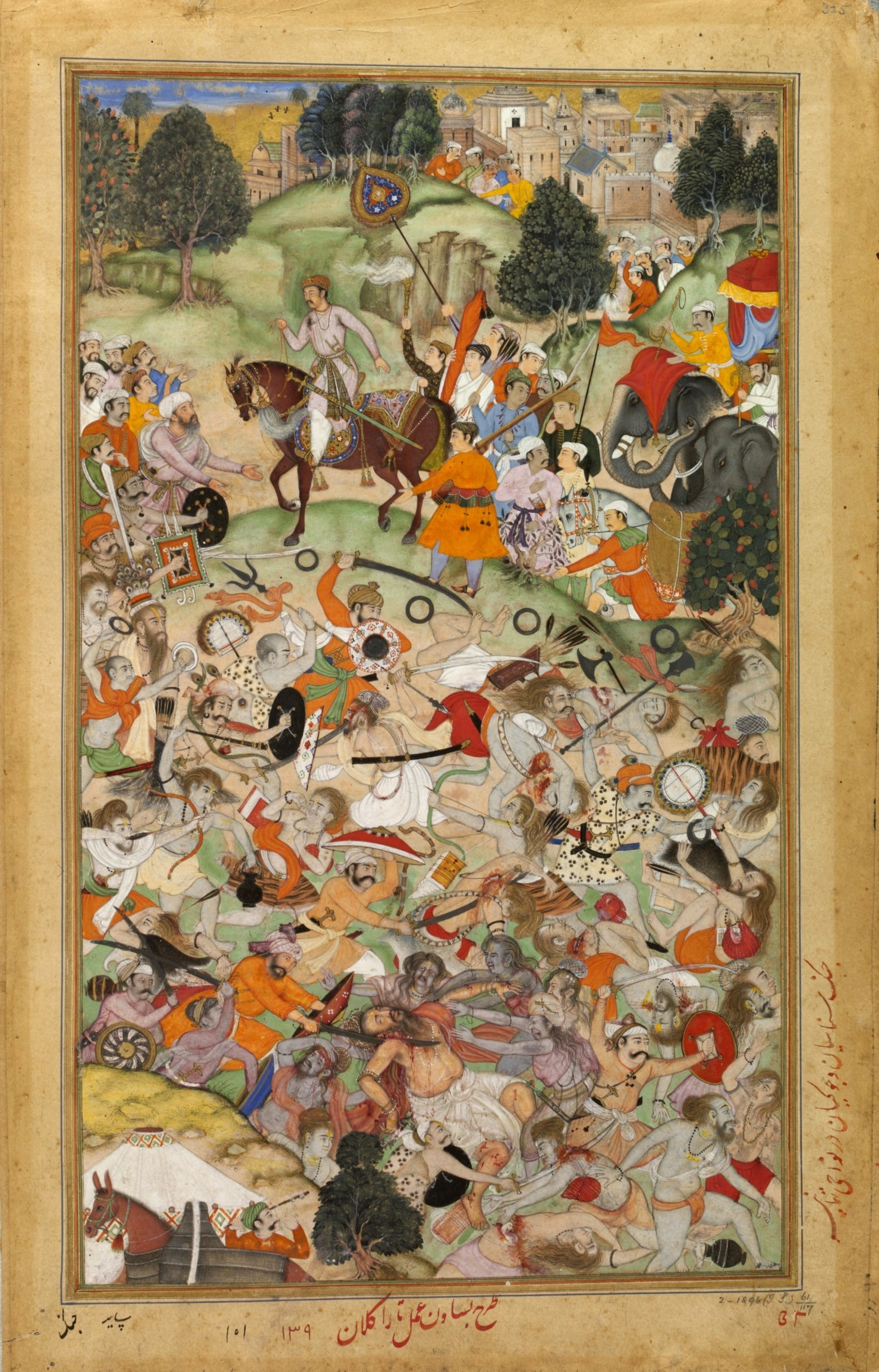
The Mughal Army commanded by Akbar attack members of the Sannyasa during the Battle of Thanesar, 1567

Ascetic life was historically a life of renunciation, non-violence and spiritual pursuit. However, in India, this has not always been the case. For example, after the Mongol and Persian Islamic invasions in the 12th century, and the establishment of Delhi Sultanate, the ensuing Hindu-Muslim conflicts provoked the creation of a military order of Hindu ascetics in India. These warrior ascetics formed paramilitary groups called Akharas and they invented a range of martial arts.

Nath Siddhas of the 12th century CE, may have been the earliest Hindu monks to resort to a military response after the Muslim conquest. Ascetics, by tradition, led a nomadic and unattached lifestyle. As these ascetics dedicated themselves to rebellion, their groups sought stallions, developed techniques for spying and targeting, and they adopted strategies of war against Muslim nobles and the Sultanate state. Many of these groups were devotees of Hindu deity Mahadeva, and were called Mahants. Other popular names for them was Sannyasis, Yogis, Nagas (followers of Shiva), Bairagis (followers of Vishnu) and Gosains from the 16th to the 19th centuries; in some cases, these Hindu monks cooperated with Muslim fakirs who were Sufi and also persecuted.

Warrior monks continued their rebellion through the Mughal Empire, and became a political force during the early years of British Raj notably the Sannyasi rebellion (1763-1800). In some cases, these regiments of soldier monks shifted from guerrilla campaigns to war alliances, and these Hindu warrior monks played a key role in helping British establish themselves in India. The significance of warrior ascetics rapidly declined with the consolidation of British Raj in late 19th century, and with the rise in non-violence movement by Mahatma Gandhi.

Novetzke states that some of these Hindu warrior ascetics were treated as folk heroes, aided by villagers and townspeople, because they targeted figures of political and economic power in a discriminatory state, and some of these warriors paralleled Robin Hood's lifestyle.

== Upanishads ==
Sannyasa, or the renunciant way of life, is discussed in various Upanishads.

=== Major Upanishads ===
Among the thirteen major or Principal Upanishads, all from the ancient era, many include sections related to Sannyasa. The Mundaka Upanishad discusses the path of Sannyasa as a means to attain spiritual knowledge and liberation. It emphasizes the renunciant's simple and austere lifestyle in pursuit of wisdom. The motivations and state of a Sannyasi are mentioned in Maitrāyaṇi Upanishad, a classical major Upanishad that Robert Hume included among his list of "Thirteen Principal Upanishads" of Hinduism. Maitrāyaṇi starts with the question, "given the nature of life, how is joy possible?" and "how can one achieve moksha (liberation)?"; in later sections it offers a debate on possible answers and its views on Sannyasa.

In this body infected with passions, anger, greed, delusion, fright, despondency, grudge, separation from what is dear and desirable, attachment to what is not desirable, hunger, thirst, old age, death, illness, sorrow and the rest - how can one experience only joy? – Hymn I.3

The drying up of great oceans, the crumbling down of the mountains, the instability of the pole-star, the tearing of the wind-chords, the sinking down, the submergence of the earth, the tumbling down of the gods from their place - in a world in which such things occur, how can one experience only joy ?! – Hymn I.4

— Maitrayaniya Upanishad, Translated by Paul Deussen

Dragged away and polluted by the river of the Gunas (personality), one becomes rootless, tottering, broken down, greedy, uncomposed and falling in the delusion of I-consciousness, he imagines: "I am this, this is mine" and binds himself, like a bird in the net. – Hymn VI.30

Just as the fire without fuel comes to rest in its place,
so also the passive mind comes to rest in its source;
When it (mind) is infatuated by the objects of sense, he falls away from truth and acts;
Mind alone is the Samsara, one should purify it with diligence;
You are what your mind is, a mystery, a perpetual one;
The mind which is serene, cancels all actions good and bad;
He, who, himself, serene, remains steadfast in himself - he attains imperishable happiness. – Hymn VI.34

— Maitrayaniya Upanishad, Translated by Paul Deussen

=== Sannyasa Upanishads ===
Of the 108 Upanishads of the Muktika, the largest corpus is dedicated to Sannyasa and to Yoga, or about 20 each, with some overlap. The renunciation-related texts are called the Sannyasa Upanishads. These are as follows:

Veda	Sannyāsa
Ṛigveda	Nirvāṇa
Samaveda	Āruṇeya, Maitreya, Sannyāsa, Kuṇḍika
Krishna Yajurveda	Brahma, Avadhūta, See Kathashruti
Shukla Yajurveda	Jābāla, Paramahaṃsa, Advayatāraka, Bhikṣuka, Turīyātīta, Yājñavalkya, Śāṭyāyani
Atharvaveda	Ashrama, Nāradaparivrājaka (Parivrāt), Paramahaṃsa parivrājaka, Parabrahma

Six of the Sannyasa Upanishads – Aruni, Kundika, Kathashruti, Paramahamsa, Jabala and Brahma – were composed before the 3rd-century CE, likely in the centuries before or after the start of the common era, states Sprockhoff; the Asrama Upanishad is dated to the 3rd-century, the Naradaparivrajaka and Satyayaniya Upanishads to around the 12th-century, and about ten of the remaining Sannyasa Upanishads are dated to have been composed in the 14th- to 15th-century CE well after the start of Islamic Sultanates period of South Asia in late 12th-century.

The oldest Sannyasa Upanishads have a strong Advaita Vedanta outlook, and these pre-date Adi Shankara. Most of the Sannyasa Upanishads present a Yoga and nondualism (Advaita) Vedanta philosophy. This may be, states Patrick Olivelle, because major Hindu monasteries of early medieval period (1st millennium CE) belonged to the Advaita Vedanta tradition. The 12th-century Shatyayaniya Upanishad is a significant exception, which presents qualified dualistic and Vaishnavism (Vishishtadvaita Vedanta) philosophy.

== See also ==
- Brahmacharya
- Diksha
- Grihastha
- Jangam Sannyasi
- Gymnosophist
- Monk
- Neo-sannyas
- Nun
- Sanyasa yoga
- Swami Sharnanandji
- Vairāgya
- Vanaprastha
- Yogi
