= Sāṁvartaka =

Divine force or power in Hinduism and Jainism

In Hinduism and Jainism, Sāṁvartaka or Sanvartaka is a divine force or power normally used by the deity Indra. Described as being a cloud of energy or fire, the force is used to destroy or despoil that which displeases Indra. The force is referenced to in Hindu and Jainist texts. Samvartaka is also strongly associated with comets.

== Description ==
In Hinduism and Jainism, Samvartaka is a force primarily wielded by the god Indra. However, some texts portray the force as being wielded by deities other than Indra. Regardless of caller or wielder, the force is portrayed as being incredibly destructive.

=== Instances of use ===
In the epic Vana Parva, Indra calls forth Samvartaka to settle a dispute between himself and Krishna. In the epic, a jealous and prideful Indra sends the cloud to flood the lands of Vrindavan; this is stopped by the intervention of Krishna, who lifts the Govardhan Hill to shield the land from the devastating rain the cloud brings.

In Book 3 of the Vana Parva, the hero Yudhishthira prays to the sun, asking the celestial body to "let the fire Samvartaka born of thy wrath consumeth the three worlds and existence alone" upon the dissolution of the universe. Similarly, the sage Markandeya describes to Yudhishthira how samvartaka, spread by an inauspicious wind, will consume the earth.

In the Skanda Purana, a Rudra (storm god) is able to release and command samvartaka to subdue a great bull that has threatened to drink dry the oceans. In this story, samvartaka is depicted as a raging fire.

In the works of Garga, samvartaka is described as a devastating, energetic force that will arrive as one of two comets. In the sage's words, "Like the stellar wheel rotating (repeating) in the sky, the comet-wheel also repeats in the sky. At the end of 1000 years, at the end of the comet strand, two comets—Dhūma and Samvartaka—appear together." Garga writes that these twin comets will cause earthquakes and meteorite showers that will sunder the mountains and the oceans. He notes that samvartaka will be the more devastating of the two, as it will be responsible for "reducing" the world.

Another Vedic text also refers to samvartaka as a comet. In this text, the comet appears and grows so large as to take up one third of the sky. It is described as having "a thin dreadful copper colored spear-like head, ejecting a jet of smoke." While the comet hangs above the world, kings are projected to fight among themselves.
