= Jabala Upanishad =

Minor Upanishad of Hinduism

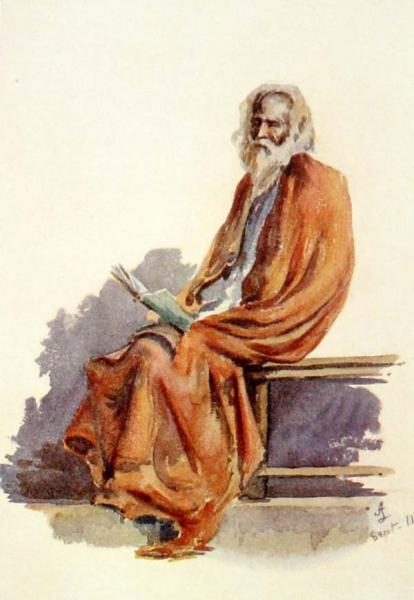
- The Jabala Upanishad discusses sannyasi (the ones who have renounced)
- Devanagari: जाबाल
- Title means: Named after Vedic school
- Date: before 300 CE, likely BCE
- Linked Veda: Shukla Yajurveda
- Verses: Six chapters with 14 verses
- Philosophy: Vedanta

The Jabala Upanishad (Sanskrit: जाबाल उपनिषद्, IAST: Jābāla Upaniṣad), also called Jabalopanisad, is a minor Upanishad of Hinduism. The Sanskrit text is one of the 20 Sannyasa Upanishads, and is attached to the Shukla Yajurveda.

The Jabala Upanishad is an ancient text, composed before 300 CE and likely around the 3rd century BCE. It is among the oldest Upanishads that discuss the subject of renouncing the worldly life for the exclusive pursuit of spiritual knowledge. The text discusses the city of Banaras in spiritual terms, as Avimuktam. It describes how that city became holy, then adds that the holiest place to revere is one within – the Atman (soul, self).

The Upanishad asserts that anyone can renounce – this choice is entirely up to the individual, regardless of which Ashrama (stage of life) he is in. The Jabala Upanishad seems to justify suicide as an individual choice in certain circumstances, a view opposed by earlier Vedic texts and Principal Upanishads. Those too sick may renounce the worldly life in their mind. The Jabala Upanishad presents the Vedanta philosophy view that one who truly renounces lives an ethical life, which includes not injuring anyone in thought, word or deed. Such a sannyasi (renunciate) abandons all rituals, is without attachments to anything or anyone, and is one who is devoted to the oneness of Atman and Brahman.

== History ==
The Jabala Upanishad is an ancient text, composed before 300 CE and likely around the 3rd century BCE, and among the oldest that discuss the subject of renouncing the worldly life for the exclusive pursuit of spiritual knowledge. The text is also referred to as Jabalopanishad (Sanskrit: जाबालोपनिषत्) or Gabala Upanishad.

The themes of this Upanishad are meditation and renunciation. Sage Yajnavalkya "as the expounder of the precepts of this Upanishad" elaborates on the aspects of renunciation of the worldly life, in the interests of achieving spiritual enlightenment as the "transcendence of attachment to every desire, including the desire for renunciation itself". According to Sarvepalli Radhakrishnan, a professor of Eastern Religions and Ethics, this Upanishad seems to justify suicide in certain circumstances, a view opposed by earlier Vedic texts and principal Upanishads. The text discusses the city of Banaras as "one Shiva never leaves", and as a holy place to revere. It also is among the earliest texts which states that the four stages of life are not necessarily sequential in that anyone can renounce their worldly life at any time. The Jabala Upanishad presents the Vedanta philosophy view that the proper life of a sannyasi is not about any rituals, nor wearing any sacrificial thread, but about the knowledge of one's soul (Atman, self).

In the Vedic-era literature, only three ashramas (life stages) were mentioned, with Brahmacharya (student) as the first stage and the Grihastha (householder) as the second stage. The third stage of life, in the Vedic texts, combined Vanaprastha (retired or forest dweller) and Sannyasa (renunciation) as one ashrama. According to Soti Shivendra Chandra, a scholar at the Rohilkhand University, the separation of Vanaprastha and Sannyasa as two different stages of life is first mentioned in the Jabala Upanishad. However, Patrick Olivelle, a professor at the University of Texas at Austin, states that the Sannyasa ashrama as a separate stage is mentioned in Aruni Upanishad, which likely is a more ancient Upanishad.

== Chronology and anthology ==
It is unclear when the Jabala Upanishad was composed, as is true with most ancient Indian texts. Textual references and literary style suggest that this Hindu text is ancient, composed before the Asrama Upanishad which is dated to 300 CE. Hajime Nakamura, a Japanese scholar of Vedic literature, dates Jabala Upanishad along with Paramahamsa Upanishad to around the start of the common era. The German scholar of Upanishads, Joachim Sprockhoff, assigns it to be from the last few centuries prior to the beginning of the common era, while the German Indologist Georg Feuerstein dates it to around 300 BCE. The text is one of the oldest renunciation-related Upanishads.

In the anthology of 108 Upanishads of the Muktika canon, narrated by Rama to Hanuman, it is listed at number 13. In the Colebrooke anthology of 52 Upanishads, which is popular in North India, the Jabala Upanishad is listed at number 51. In Narayana's anthology of 52 Upanishads, which is popular in South India, the Jabala Upanishad is listed at number 39 or 40 depending on the manuscript. In later compilations brought out in South India, it is part of the 108 Upanishads. In the 30 minor Upanishads published by the 19th-century Sanskrit scholar Ramamaya Tarkaratna in the Bibliothica Indica, the Jabala Upanishad is given the name Gabala Upanishad and listed at number 28.

The Jabala Upanishad is one of the 20 Sannyasa Upanishads. The Sultan Mohammed Dara Shikhoh, in 1656 helped organize and publish a collection of 50 Upanishads translated into the Persian language, with the title of Oupanekhat; in this collection the Jabala Upanishad is listed at number 29 and "Jabala" is spelled "Djabal". This Persian translation was itself translated into Latin by Anquetil du Perron in 1801–02, wherein Anquetil remarked that the Indians are reading this collection of Upanishads all the time "knowing it to be the best book on religion". The Anquetil translation brought the Upanishads to the attention of Arthur Schopenhauer and other western philosophers.

== Structure ==
The Sanskrit text of this Upanishad has six chapters. Sage Yajnavalkya answers questions in the first five, wherein the questions are posed by Brihaspati, Atri, students of Brahman-Atman, King Janaka and by Atri again. The last chapter lists the names of famous sages who were model sannyasis (renunciates).

The extant texts are found in two versions. One consists of six chapters structured into 14 verses, while the other version has six chapters with the same content but does not number the 14 verses.

The first three chapters are devoted to defining the place where the seat of all beings and ultimate reality (Brahman) resides, and how to reach it through meditation, the Hindu god Shiva and the city of Varanasi. The next three chapters relate to renunciation. They describe the characteristics of a Paramahamsa as one who has reached the highest status of spirituality, who abandons all external signs of asceticism and discards all relationships or worldly comforts to know "Brahman, the nature of the Self".

== Contents ==
=== Holy city of Varanasi ===
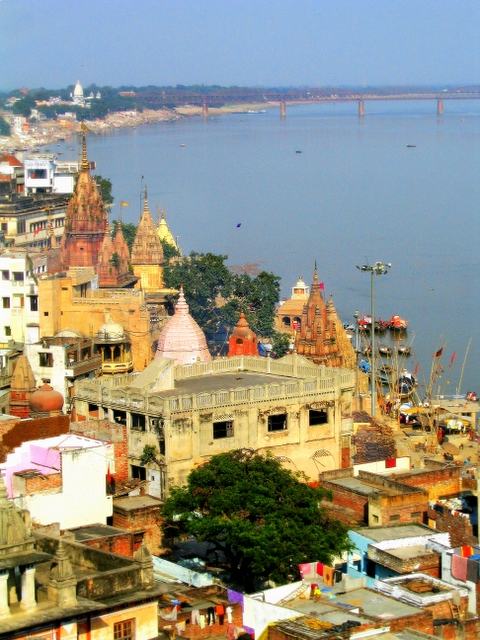
The Hindu holy city of Varanasi is discussed in the Jabala Upanishad.

The first chapter of the Upanishad opens as a conversation between Brihaspati and Yajnavalkya, where Brihaspati asks Yajnavalkya for information about the place where the seat of all beings, the Brahman, lives. Yajnavalkya states that true Brahman-seat of all beings, or Kurukshetra, is Avimuktam – a place that Shiva never left. This Avimuktam is a part of Varanasi (Banaras). All renouncers, after having wandered places, should stay at this Avimuktam. This is the place, asserts the Upanishad, where Rudra imparts the moksha knowledge just when the last vital breaths of the dying are departing, leading one to videhamukti (salvation after death). This place is holy, a place to revere and not leave.

In the second chapter, sage Atri asks Yajnavalkya "how can I know this infinite, non-manifested Atman?" The Atman, states Yajnavalkya, can be found in Avimuktam. Atri then asks how to find Avimuktam. The Jabala Upanishad uses wordplay to express a literal and hidden allegorical meaning. Yajnavalkya answers that Avimuktam is to be found between Varana and Nasi, or Varayati and Nasayati.

Geographically, the city of Varanasi is situated on the Ganges river, where two small, mostly dry rivers named Varana and Asi join the Ganges. Metaphorically, the text adds, Varana is named as it wards off errors of organs (Varayati), and Nasi is named as it destroys the sins committed by one's organs (Nasayati). Atri, after listening to this metaphorical answer, repeats his question, with "but where is this place of Avimuktam?" Yajnavalkya replies that Avimuktam is already within Atri, "where his nose and eye brows meet, for there is the place of the world of heaven and highest world of Brahman." This Avimuktam is the "abode of Brahman".

A person who is aware of Brahman reveres it as the Atman in the Avimuktam within him. Ramanathan interprets this verse to mean that one who knows the true nature of Avimuktam understands that "the individual Self (soul) is no other than the attributeless Brahman".

In the third chapter, the shortest in the Upanishad, the students of Brahman ask Yajnavalkya to recommend a hymn that guides someone to immortality. Yajnavalkya recommends the Satarudriya, the hymn with the hundred names of the god Rudra. This hymn is found in sections 16.1 to 16.66 of the Vajasaneyi Samhita in Yajurveda, and is conceived as many epithets of Atman.

=== How to renounce ===
In the fourth chapter of the Upanishad, King Janaka of Videha asks Yajnavalkya, "Lord, explain Sannyasa [renunciation]."

Yajnavalkya answers that one may complete Brahmacharya (the student stage of life), then Grihastha (householder), followed by Vanaprastha (retirement) and finally Sannyasa (pilgrimage as Parivrajaka Bhikshu, renunciation). Or, continues Yajnavalkya, one may renounce immediately after completing the student stage of life, or after the householder stage, regardless of whether or not one has completed the sacred fire ritual or any other rituals. Olivelle interprets the sacred fire ritual reference as an indirect reference to marriage, and thus the text asserts that those who have married or never married can both renounce. The Jabala Upanishad herein recommends that a person may renounce on the day he feels detached from the world, regardless of which stage of life he is in, and whether he has completed that stage.

Yajnavalkya states that some people perform the Prajapati ritual when they renounce, but this should not be done. A person should instead make an offering to Agni (fire) that is one's own vital breath. He should make the "three-element offering", namely, to "Sattva [goodness], Rajas [energy] and Tamas [darkness]" within. (Note: These are the three Guṇa in the Samkhya school of Hindu philosophy.) He should revere Prana (internal life force) because it is the yoni (womb, birthplace) of all fires. If he cannot obtain this fire, he should offer the oblation "Om! I offer to all godheads, svaha" with water as he begins the renunciation stage of life. As he offers this oblation, he should learn that the liberating mantra of Om is the three Vedas (Note: The "Om" is traditionally considered in Hindu texts to be composed of three syllables, "A", "U" and "M". The oldest Upanishads consider these syllables as symbolism for the three Vedas – the Rigveda, the Samaveda and the Yajurveda. The "Om" is also asserted in these texts to symbolize Brahman and Atman, the ontological concepts in Hinduism. The Jabala Upanishad mentions only three Vedas, instead of four, which suggests that it is likely an ancient text, because the fourth Veda called the Atharvaveda, though composed around 1000 BCE, gained acceptance as a Veda in ancient India in the centuries around the start of the common era, even in Buddhists texts.) and the Brahman to be revered.

=== Life is sacred, ending it a choice ===
If he is too ill (to observe renunciation), then he may practise the renunciation only mentally and by words.

— Yajnavalkya in Jabala Upanishad Chapter 5

In the fifth chapter, Atri asks Yajnavalkya whether someone pursuing Brahman can be without the sacred thread. According to the translation by Paul Deussen, a professor and German Indologist, Yajnavalkya answers that "this very thing is sacred thread, namely the Atman". A renouncer or Parivrajaka (another term for renouncer) performs a sacrifice to the Atman whenever he feeds himself or rinses his mouth with water. Feeding and dressing his Prana (life force) is the only duty of the renouncer.

Yajnavalkya states that the renouncer can choose a hero's death by dying in a "just war", or abstain from eating any food, or go into water or fire, or start off on the "great journey". (Note: The "great journey" refers to the choice of walking north without eating till one dies, while "hero's death" refers to dying in a "just war" that is a war that is morally justified.) This section has led some scholars to believe that this Upanishad may be giving the choice of ending life to the individual and justifying suicide in certain circumstances. (Note: Some scholars have translated this verse very differently, adding their own interpretations in brackets. See Paul Deussen, Ramanathan, and Margaret Battin, for examples of different interpretations. The recent translation and interpretation by Olivelle is similar to that of Deussen.) This view is different from Vedic texts and Principal Upanishads which consider suicide to be wrong.

According to this Upanishad, the renouncer pilgrim undertakes the journey to the knowledge of Brahman with purity of thought, without belongings, with his head shaved, wearing discoloured garments, free from enmity towards all, and he lives on alms. This method is not essential for anyone too sick or in mortal danger – such a person may renounce verbally or mentally.

=== Paramahamsa: the ideal renouncer ===
In the sixth and final chapter, Yajnavalkya lists exemplars of Paramahamsas, (Note: The word Paramahamsa means "highest swan or gander" and refers to an exalted type of renouncer.) the highest renouncers: the sages Samvartaka, Aruni, Svetaketu, Durvasa, Ribhu, Nidagha, Jadabharata, Dattatreya and Raivataka. The Paramahamsas do not carry articles or show signs that suggest they have renounced, their conduct is concealed, they may only seem insane. They do not carry staves, nor bowl, nor hair tuft, nor sacred thread, but they are the ones who seek after the Atman (self, soul).

Naked as he was born, beyond the pair of opposites (joy versus sorrow etc.), without belongings, wholly devoted to the way to truth, the Brahman, with a pure heart, going out, begging alms at a proper time (Note: The proper time for seeking alms in the Hindu renunciation tradition is late afternoon, when people have already finished their meals and may have leftovers.) only to sustain his life, with the belly as his utensil, even-tempered whether he gets anything or not, staying homeless, whether in a deserted house, in a temple, on a heap of grass, on an ant-hill, at the roots of tree, in a potter's workshop, on a river bank, in a mountain cave, in a ravine, in a hollow tree, at a waterfall, or just bare ground, not striving, free from feeling of "mine", given to pure contemplation, firmly rooted in the supreme Self, eradicating all evil deeds, [...] he is called a Paramahamsa.

— Jabala Upanishad, Chapter 6 (abridged)

The Paramahamsa is the renouncer who seeks his own self, abandons impure acts and evil within, who devotes himself to meditating on the Atman and the Brahman.

== Influence ==
Five important Upanishad texts, according to Olivelle – the Jabala plus the Aruni, Laghu-Samnyasa, Kathashruti and Paramahamsa Upanishads – provide different answers to the question of when someone may renounce the worldly life to lead a monastic one. The Laghu-Samnyasa Upanishad, Kathashruti Upanishad and Paramahamsa Upanishad suggest that a man may renounce after sequentially completing the student, householder and retirement stages of life, and then getting the consent of his elders and direct family members. In contrast, the Jabala Upanishad and Aruni Upanishad assert that the choice is entirely up to the individual, without needing to have completed any stage of life nor requiring the consent of anyone else.

If an individual feels Vairagya (detachment from the world), the Jabala Upanishad maintains that no preconditions apply, and the individual has the spiritual right to renounce immediately. This principle in the Jabala Upanishad was cited by medieval-era scholars such as Adi Shankara, (Note: Of all the Sannyasa Upanishads, the Jabala Upanishad was the only one Shankara cited in his bhasya on Brahma Sutras, and he did so several times, at 1.2.32, 2.1.3, 3.3.37–41, 3.4.17–18 etc.) Vijñāneśvara, Sureśvara, and Nilakantha as the Vedic basis that makes renunciation an individual choice and right. This choice has been referred to as a Vikalpa by the later scholars, which the society and state must respect. The Jabala Upanishad concurred with some Dharmasastras on the right to renounce and lead a monastic life, but its views contradicted others such as those in Manusmriti verses 6.35–37. The text fed a debate on the right of the individual, and medieval Hindu scholars relied on and sided with the Jabala Upanishad.

The Jabala Upanishad influenced other scholarly works as well. The Jivanmukti-viveka, written by the 14th-century Advaita Vedanta scholar and Vijayanagara Empire mentor Vidyaranya, refers to the Jabala Upanishad while describing those who achieve living liberation.

== See also ==
- Ashrama (stage) – the four stages of human life
- Puruṣārtha – the four goals of human life
