= Aruneya Upanishad =

Minor Upanishad of Hinduism

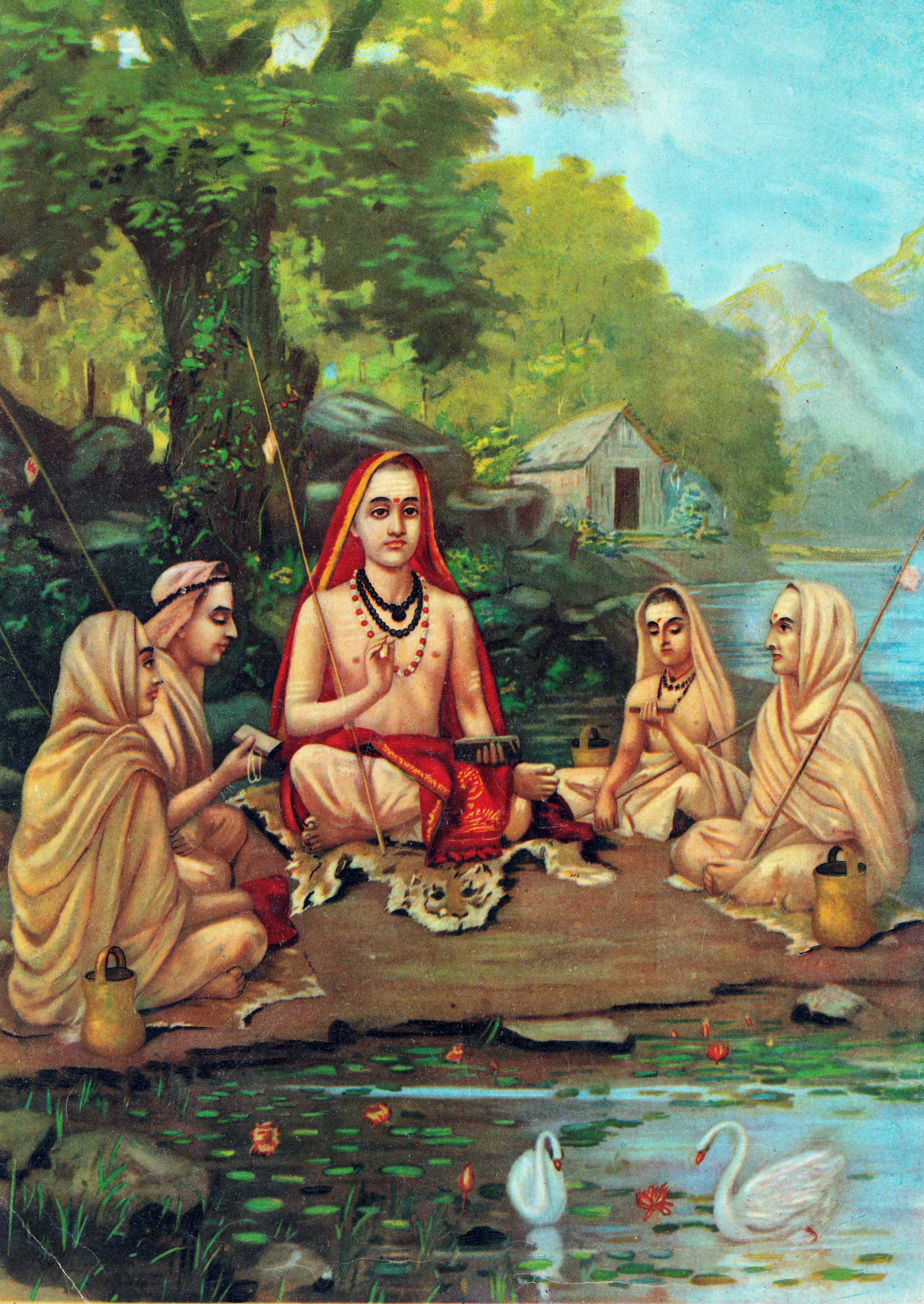
- Hindu monks
- Devanagari: आरुणेय/अरुणी
- IAST: Āruṇeya/Āruṇeyī
- Title means: Name of the Sage Aruni
- Date: 1st millennium BCE
- Type: Sannyasa
- Linked Veda: Samaveda
- Chapters: 1
- Verses: 5

Aruneya Upanishad (Sanskrit : आरुणेय उपनिषद्) is a minor Upanishad in the corpus of the 108 Upanishads of Hinduism. It is written in Sanskrit. It is one of the 16 Upanishads attached to the Samaveda. It is classified as a Sannyasa Upanishad.

It deals with the cultural phenomenon of a Sannyasi (Hindu monk), a practitioner of Sannyasa or renunciation. The Upanishad also outlines the character and lifestyle of a Paramahamsa, the monk who has achieved the highest state of spirituality. The text is told as a sermon from the god Prajapati (identified with Brahma in some commentaries) to the sage Aruni, who gives his name to this Upanishad.

The text is dated from the 1st-millennium BCE, and is notable for its details on the renunciation tradition in ancient India. The Upanishad recommends the practice of Samadhi as a means to know the Atman (Self), which states Patrick Olivelle, contextually means deep yogic contemplation. It is also notable as one of the earliest text stating that knowledge qualifies one to undertake Sannyasa, a position different from other ancient Upanishads such as the Jabala Upanishad which states that detachment from the world qualifies one to begin the journey of renunciation. The text, states Paul Deussen, is a vivid record of a remarkable cultural phenomenon of ancient India, that has survived into the modern era, and "what gave birth to it lies in Man, lies in all of us".

The text also known as Aruneyi Upanishad, Arunika Upanishad and Aruni Upanishad.

== Chronology ==
The Aruni Upanishad is one of the oldest renunciation-related Upanishad. The text was likely completed between 4th-century BCE to the start of the common era, according to Sprockhoff, the German scholar of Upanishads and according to Patrick Olivelle.

== Contents ==
By what means, O Lord,
can I give up rituals completely?

— Aruni Upanishad Chapter 1

The Aruneya Upanishad is presented as a conversation between the sage Aruni and the Vedic god Prajapati (some translations consider Prajapati an epithet of Brahma). The text opens by Aruni visiting Prajapati and asking him the means by which he can stop the need for any and all rituals.

Prajapati tells him to relinquish all relationships (sons, brothers, sisters, friends etc.) as well as external symbols like the a hair tuft and the sacred thread. He must also give up on the Vedic recitation and all mantra chanting, everything in the entire universe that he is attached to. Take up a garment and a staff, states the text, then begin the journey of renunciation.

Prajapati also tells Aruni to abandon the seven upper realms of the universe - Bhur, Bhuvah, Svar, Mahas, Jana, Tapas, Satya, and the seven lower realms of “Atala, Patala, Vitala, Sutala, Rasatala, Mahatala, Talatala, and egg of creation of the world." Give up all material things of life.

Prajapati teaches Aruni that in the three stages of life (ashram) - Brahmacharya (student), Grihastha (householder), and in Vanaprastha (forest dwelling retirement), one should perform Prana-Agnihotra fire sacrifices to serve the fire in the stomach, and recite Gayatri mantra to serve the fire of speech. He should dispense with his hair tuft and the sacred thread into the ground or throw it in water.

In Brahmacharya stage, as a pupil, he should forego all attachments with his relatives, surrender his begging bowl and filtering cloth as well as the realms of the universe and also discontinue performing fire sacrifices which give him material comforts. As a renouncer, he should give up Vedic mantras. He should bathe thrice a day - dawn, noon, and dusk, intensely meditate to realize and gain union with Atman (soul). and recite just the Aranyakas and the Upanishads.

=== How to renounce? ===
As a renouncer, after "I am truly Brahman", should consider Brahman as the internal sacred string, therefrom "I am the string", and so he should throw away the external sacred thread. Uttering three times the words, “I have renounced, I have renounced, I have renounced”, he should pick up a bamboo staff and the loins-cloth, thus begin his journey. He should expect little food, eat sparingly as if food was a medicine.

Sannyasi's promise to self

All beings are safe from me,
I shall not be a source of fear for any living being,
for everything has proceeded from me.

— Aruni Upanishad Chapter 3

The renouncer must give up anger, greed, delusions, deceit, falsehood and desire. He must observe non-violence, truthfulness, chastity and sharing with others passionately.

He should consider his staff (walking stick) as his friend, and say, "You are my energy and friend to me, you are Indra’s thunderbolt".

=== The Paramahamsas ===
Prajapati further tells about the Paramahamsa Parivrajaka, the highest class of monks. They are wandering monks who are believed to have attained enlightenment. They remain homeless, sleep and sit only on the ground, live by begging with a bowl made of mud or gourd or wood. During the four months of rainy season, he should reside at one place, and in the balance eight months, he should be a wandering monk on his own.

After grasping the meaning of the Vedas, before or after the sacred thread ceremony, the renouncer leaves his father, mother, wife, family and friends, his work and gives up the sacred thread and fire sacrifices as well as all material objects. He should go to a village only with intent to beg for food, with his belly as his bowl, and eat only what he gains as alms.

The word Om should be his Upanishad.

Ultimately, he abandons his Palasa, Bilva, Udumbara staff, his deerskin, his girdle, his string. He who knows this (hymn from Rigveda 1.22.20-1.22.21), conquers:

And the highest step of Vishnu
The sages always see
Like an eye stretched across the sky
That highest step of Vishnu
The wise men ever vigilant,
Light up with joyous praise.

— Aruni Upanishad, Chapter 5, Translated by Patrick Olivelle,

This is what Vedas teach, this is the teaching on liberation, states the Aruneya Upanishad.
