= Paramahamsa Upanishad =

Paramahansa
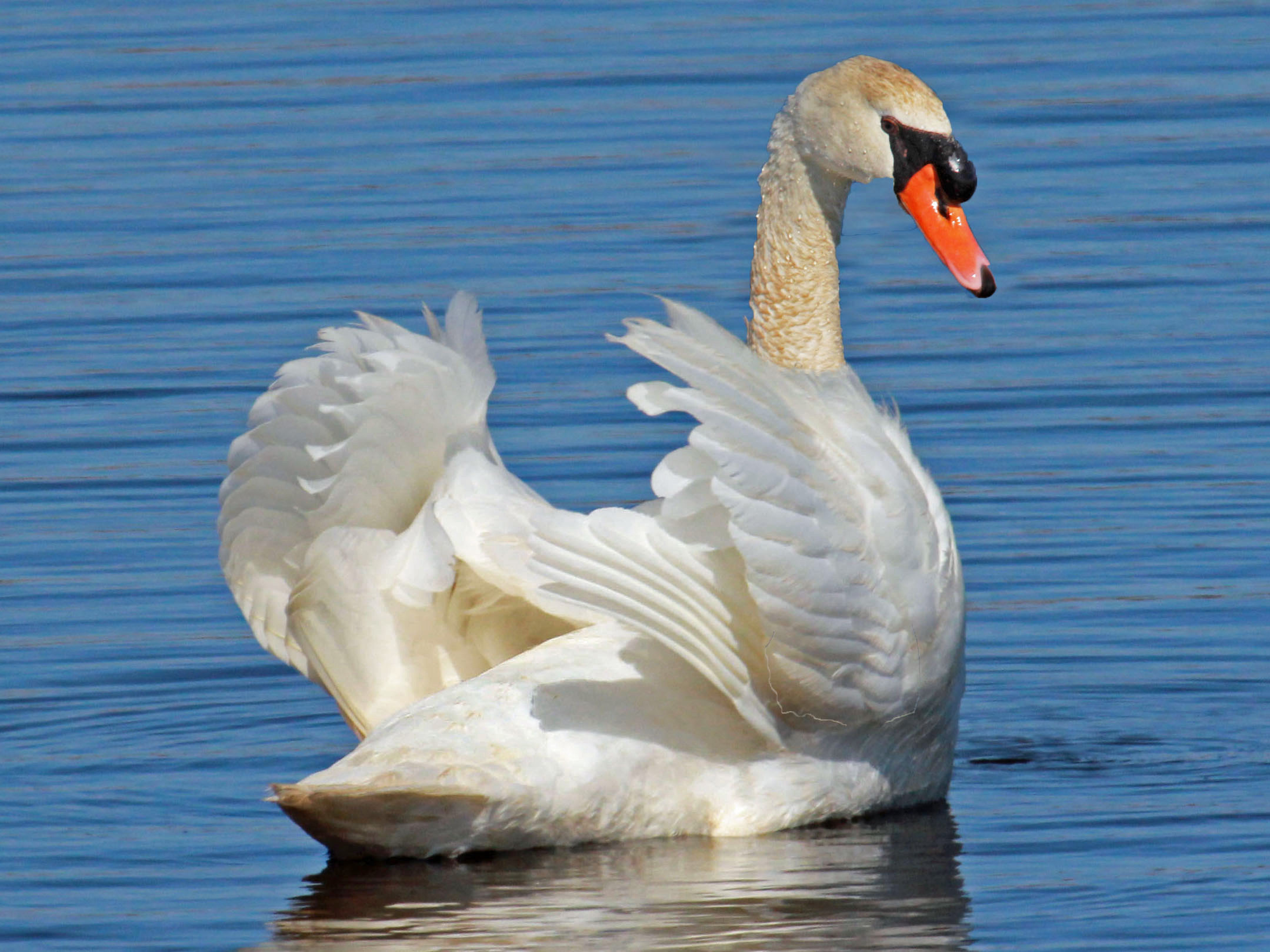
- The title of the text means highest swan
- Devanagari: परमहंस उपनिषद
- IAST: Paramahaṃsa
- Title means: highest monk, illumined soul
- Type: Sannyasa
- Linked Veda: Atharvaveda
- Chapters: 1
- Verses: 4

The Paramahansa Upanishad (Sanskrit: परमहंस उपनिषद), is one of the 108 Upanishadic Hindu scriptures, written in Sanskrit and is one of the 31 Upanishads attached to the Atharvaveda. It is classified as one of the Sannyasa Upanishads. According to Ramanujacharya, Paramhansa is one of the forms of Vishnu who imparted vedas to Brahma in the form of Divine Swan as per Vishnu-Sahasranama.

The Upanishad is a discourse between the Hindu god Brahma and sage Narada. Their conversation is centered on the characteristics of Paramahansa (highest soul) Yogi. The text describes the monk as a Jivanmukta, a liberated soul while alive, and Videhamukta is liberation in afterlife.

The text was likely composed in the centuries preceding the start of common era. It is notable for the use of words Yogin and calling renouncers by that epithet.

== Chronology ==
The century in which Paramahansa Upanishad was composed is not known. The text is ancient since it is referred to in other ancient text whose dating is better established. These textual references and literary style suggest that this Hindu text was composed before the Asrama Upanishad which is dated to the 3rd-century CE. The German scholar of Upanishads, Sprockhoff, assigns it to be from the last few centuries of the 1st millennium BCE.

== Contents ==
The Upanishad, in its opening and concluding hymns, emphasizes the primacy of infiniteness of the Brahman and the Universe, with the Brahman representing the infinite. The Upanishad's theme is presented in four hymns as an explanation by Brahma to Narada's query on the aspect of the path of the Paramahansa Yogis.

Hansa or divine swan, which is used to highlight the supremacy of the Paramahansa Yogi, meaning the "illumined one", metaphorically represents the quality of the swan to separate milk from water.

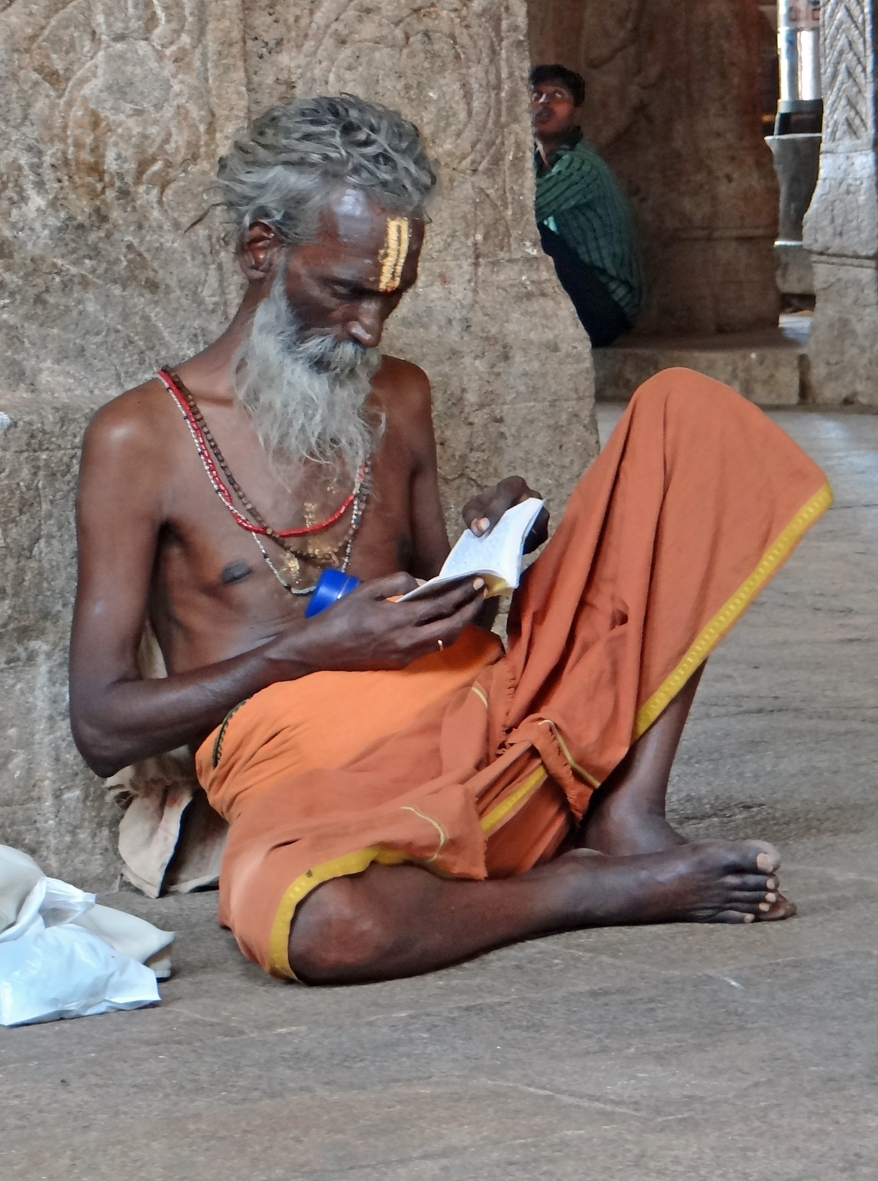
A Sannyasi

Brahma explains that attaining the stage of Paramahansa Yogi is an arduous task and such yogis are a rarity. The Paramahansa yogi is the man of the Vedas, asserts the text, he alone abides in Brahman, the eternally pure Ultimate Reality. This yogi not only renounces his wife, sons, daughters, relatives, friends, but also the sacred thread, all rituals and recitations and the topknot hair tuft. The Paramahansa has the following characteristics, states the text:

A Paramahansa is affected neither by cold nor by heat,
neither by pleasure nor by pain, neither by respect nor by disrespect.

A Paramahansa gives up slander, pride, jealousy, deceit, arrogance, desire,
he gives up hate, pleasure, pain, lust, anger, greed, delusion,
he gives up excitement, indignation, egotism, and the like.

He constantly abides in that eternally pure Being. That itself is his state.
To him, he is that calm and unchanging Being, a single mass of bliss and consciousness.
That alone is his highest abode. That alone is his topknot and his sacred string.

By knowing that the highest Self (Brahman) and the lower self (Atman) are one,
the difference between them dissolves into oneness.
This knowledge is his twilight worship.

— Paramahansa Upanishad, Chapter 2 (Abridged),

Paramahansa Yogi is neither opinionated or affected by defamation, or is jealous, not a show off, is humble, and is oblivious to all the human frailties. He is immune to the existence of his body, which he treats as a corpse. He is beyond false pretensions and lives realizing the Brahman.

In chapter 3, the Upanished states that carrying the staff of knowledge gives him the epithet "Ekadandi", as he is a renouncer of all pleasures of the world; in contrast is the person who carries a staff simply as a piece of wood goes through the stages of Maharaurava other hells, prone to worldly comforts and without knowledge. The one who understands the difference between "staff of knowledge" and "staff of wood", is a Paramahansa.

He does not fear pain, nor longs for pleasure.
He forsakes love. He is not attached to the pleasant, nor to the unpleasant.
He does not hate. He does not rejoice.

Firmly fixed in knowledge, his Self is content, well-established within.
He is called the true Yogin. He is a knower.

His consciousness is permeated with that, the perfect bliss.
That Brahman I am, he knows it. He has that goal achieved.

— Paramahamsa Upanishad, Chapter 4 (Abridged),

== See also ==
- Jabala Upanishad
- Nirvana Upanishad
- Shatyayaniya Upanishad

== Bibliography ==
- Deussen, Paul; Bedekar, V.M.; Palsule, G.B. (1 January 1997). Sixty Upanishads of the Veda. Motilal Banarsidass. ISBN 978-81-208-1467-7.
- Prasad, Ramanuj (1 January 2003). Know the Upanishads. V&S Publishers. ISBN 978-81-223-0831-0.
- Tinoco, Carlos Alberto (1997). Upanishads. IBRASA. ISBN 978-85-348-0040-2.
- Olivelle, Patrick (1992). The Samnyasa Upanisads. Oxford University Press. ISBN 978-0195070453.
- Olivelle, Patrick (1993). The Asrama System. Oxford University Press. ISBN 978-0195083279.
