= Patrick Olivelle =

Sri Lankan Indologist and Sanskrit scholar (born 1942)

- Born: 1942 (age 83–84); Sri Lanka
- Occupations: Indologist; philologist; professor
- Awards: Padma Shri

Academic background
- Education: University of Oxford (B.A.); University of Pennsylvania (Ph.D.)

Academic work
- Institutions: University of Texas at Austin
- Main interests: Ancient Indian Law, Sanskrit language and texts
- Notable works: Law Code Of Manu (2005)

Patrick Olivelle is an Indologist. A philologist and scholar of Sanskrit Literature whose work has focused on asceticism, renunciation and the dharma, Olivelle has been Professor of Sanskrit and Indian Religions in the Department of Asian Studies at the University of Texas at Austin since 1991.

== Early life ==
Olivelle was born in Sri Lanka. He received a B.A. (Honours) in 1972 from the University of Oxford, where he studied Sanskrit, Pali and Indian religions with Thomas Burrow and R.C. Zaehner. He received his Ph.D. from the University of Pennsylvania in 1974 for a thesis containing the critical edition and translation of Yadava Prakasa's Yatidharmaprakasa under the supervision of Ludo Rocher. Between 1974 and 1991, Olivelle taught in the Department of Religious Studies at Indiana University Bloomington.

== Bibliography ==
- Olivelle, Patrick (1992), The Samnyasa Upanisads : Hindu Scriptures on Asceticism and Renunciation: Hindu Scriptures on Asceticism and Renunciation, Oxford University Press, ISBN 978-0-19-536137-7
- Olivelle, Patrick (1993), The Asrama System : The History and Hermeneutics of a Religious Institution, Oxford University Press, ISBN 978-0-19-534478-3
- Olivelle, Patrick (1996), Upaniṣads, Oxford University Press
- Olivelle, Patrick (1998), The Early Upaniṣads in Sanskrit and English Parallel Texts, Oxford University Press, ISBN 978-0-19-535242-9
- Olivelle, Patrick (1999), The Dharmasutras: The Law Codes of Ancient India, Oxford World's Classics, OUP Oxford, ISBN 978-0-19-283882-7
- Olivelle, Patrick (1999), Pañcatantra: The Book of India's Folk Wisdom, Oxford World's Classics, Oxford University Press, ISBN 978-0-19-283988-6
- Olivelle, Patrick (2004), The Law Code of Manu, Oxford World's Classics, Oxford University Press, ISBN 978-0-19-280271-2
- Olivelle, Patrick (2005), Manu's Code of Law: A Critical Edition and Translation of the Manava-Dharmasastra, Oxford University Press, ISBN 978-0-19-517146-4
- Olivelle, Patrick (2006), Between the Empires : Society in India 300 BCE to 400 CE: Society in India 300 BCE to 400 CE, Oxford University Press, ISBN 978-0-19-977507-1
- Olivelle, Patrick (2009), The Law Code of Viṣṇu: A Critical Edition and Annotated Translation of the Vaiṣṇava-Dharmaśāstra, Harvard Oriental Series, No. 73, Harvard University Press, ISBN 978-0-674-05139-3
- Olivelle, Patrick, ed. (2009), Dharma: Studies in its Semantic, Cultural and Religious History, Motilal Banarsidass, ISBN 978-8120833388
- Olivelle, Patrick (2011), Language, Texts, and Society: Explorations in Ancient Indian Culture and Religion, Anthem Press, ISBN 978-0-85728-431-0
- Olivelle, Patrick (2011), Ascetics and Brahmins: Studies in Ideologies and Institutions, Anthem Press, ISBN 978-0-85728-432-7
- Olivelle, Patrick (2013), King, Governance, and Law in Ancient India: Kautilya's Arthasastra, Oxford University Press, ISBN 978-0-19-989182-5
- Olivelle, Patrick (2024), Ashoka: Portrait of a Philosopher, Yale University Press, ISBN 978-0-30-027000-6
