= Rama tapaniya Upanishad =

Hindu Vaishnava text

Rama Tapaniya Upanishad
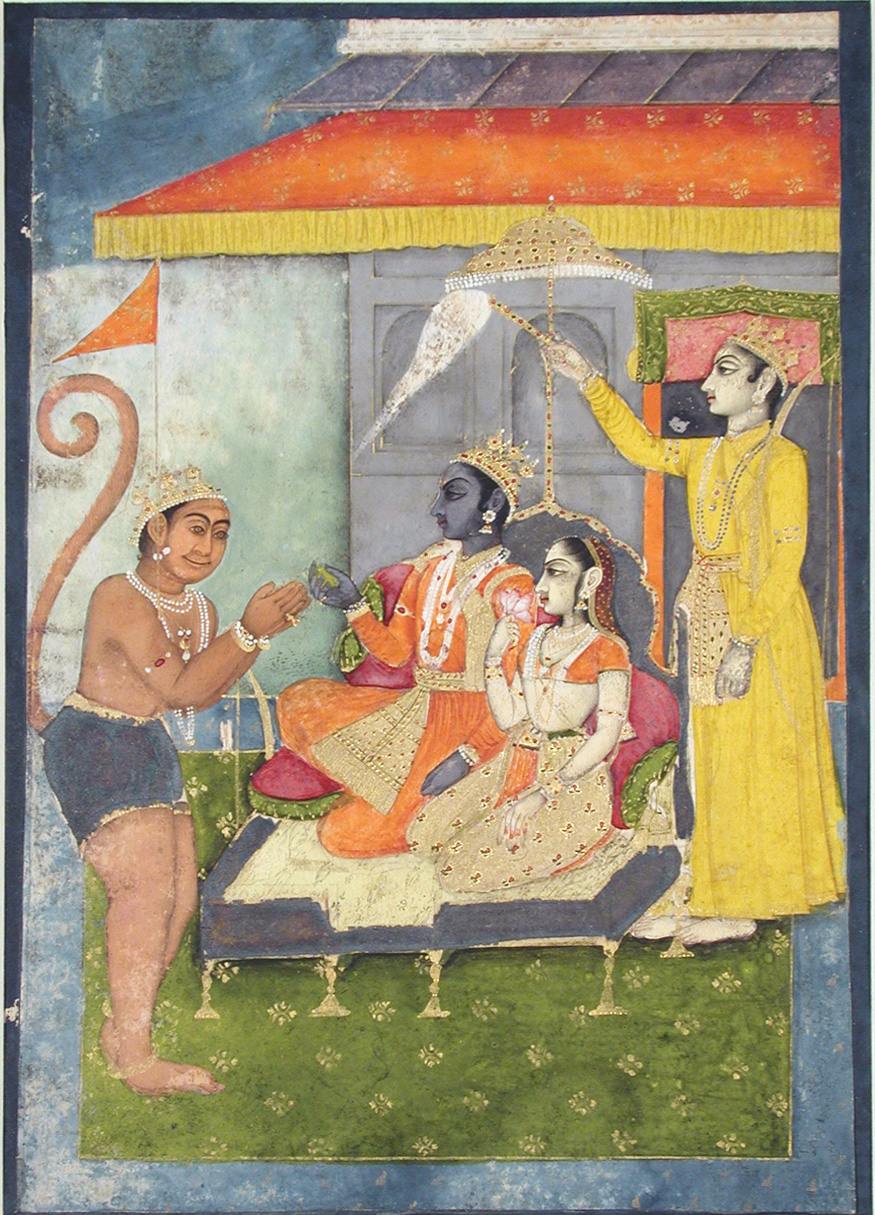
- Rama and Sita enthroned, attended by Lakshmana and Hanuman
- Devanagari: राम तापनीय
- IAST: Rāma Tāpanīya
- Title means: Upanishad of the penance towards Rama
- Date: 11th- to 16th-century
- Type: Vaishnava
- Linked Veda: Atharvaveda
- Chapters: 2
- Verses: 94 in Rama Purva, 5 prose sections in Rama Uttara
- Philosophy: Vaishnava

The Rama Tapaniya Upanishad (राम तापनीय उपनिषत्) also called Ramatapaniyopanishad (रामतापिनियोपनिषत्) is a minor Upanishadic text written in Sanskrit. It is one of the 31 Upanishads attached to the Atharvaveda, and is classified as a Vaishnava Upanishad.

The text is in two parts, the early part called Rama purva Tapaniya Upanishad and the later part called Rama uttara Tapaniya Upanishad, which together with Ramarahasya Upanishad are Vaishnava Upanishads devoted to the Hindu god Rama. The text presents Rama as equivalent to the Atman (soul, self) and the Brahman (Ultimate Reality).

The Upanishad is modeled after the Nrisimha Tapaniya Upanishad. It heavily borrows from the Vedic texts and the Principal Upanishads, praises the characters in the epic story of Rama, and then presents Om, the Rama yantra, and the Rama mantra.

== Development ==
Jaydipsinh Dodiya, writer and Dean, Faculty of Arts, Saurashtra University, dates the Rama-Tapaniya Upanishad to 11th century CE. In contrast, the text has been dated to the 16th century by Catherine Ludvik – a professor at the Stanford University and an author of books on Hindu deities.

The Rama Tapaniya Upanishad is composed in the style of the older pre-7th century Vaishnava text, the Nrisimha Tapaniya Upanishad.

According to Farquhar, a colonial era Christian missionary and an Orientalist, "Ramaite sect" is not evidenced in the Valmiki Ramayana. Instead, according to Farquhar, it is the Rama purva Tapaniya Upanishad where this sect is implied, and wherein Rama is the ultimate unchanging reality of Hindu philosophy called Brahman, as enunciated in the mantra of Rama Ramaya namah and a "mystic diagram". Farquhar adds that Rama uttara Tapaniya portion of the Upanishad is based on texts borrowed from many older Upanishads and may be of later origin.

According to Ramdas Lamb and other scholars such as Paul Deussen, the Rama Tapaniya Upanishad, like other sectarian texts, has layers of material which were likely composed over time. It probably went through a process of writing where Brahmanical value system was added. Further, states Lamb, the text was modeled after the popular Nrisimha Tapaniya Upanishad, both in structure (Purva and Uttara sections), as well as the core message that deity Rama is identical to Atman and Brahman.

In the Telugu language anthology of 108 Upanishads of the Muktika canon, narrated by Rama to Hanuman, it is listed by Paul Deussen – a German Indologist and professor of philosophy, at number 55 and in the compilation of Upanishads by Narayana – an Indian scholar who lived sometime after the 14th-century CE, and republished in the modern era as the Bibliothica Indica edition at number 36.

== Contents ==
Rama means spiritual reality

The Brahman, all spiritual, secondless,
without parts, without body,
is still looked upon as multiform,
to serve the purpose of worship.

— Rama tapaniya Upanishad 7,

The text of the Upanishad is presented in two sections – Rama purva Tapaniya Upanishad and Rama uttara Tapaniya Upanishad.

The Purva position of the Rama Tapaniya Upanishad, says Ramdas Lamb – a professor of Religion, the folk-etymology of the word Rama is presented. Rama, asserts the text, means "he who rules" (ra jate) over the kingdom of "earth" (ma-hi). He is also known as Rama, states the text, because the Yogins delight in him as ra-mante (literally one in whom they take delight). In verses 7–10, the text states that Rama is manifest ultimate reality, that is Brahman.

The Upanishad's major emphasis is on the Rama mantra Rama Ramaya namaha. Here, states Lamb, the beej mantra (seed) is asserted to contain the whole animate world, and all that exists is sourced in Rama and Sita. The Yogi who realizes the identity of Rama with Brahman and Atman (Soul) reaches liberation, states the Upanishad.

The initial verses of the Rama purva Tapaniya, says Lamb, extolls Rama and Sita with other major characters in the Ramakatha (the epic story of Rama). The Upanishad then defines the formula for erecting the Rama Yantra, the mystical mantra, with directions to inscribe beej mantra and other mantras. In the concluding section the text asserts that Rama worship leads one to the highest place and the attainment of liberation.

Ramnam and Taraka Mantra

If you whisper my formula
in the right ear of even a dying man,
Whosever he may be.
He shall be liberated, O, Siva!

— Rama to Shiva
in Rama Tapaniya Upanishad.

The Uttara portion of the Rama Tapaniya text, states Lamb, asserts that Shiva repeated the Rama mantra for thousands of ages, and Rama then gave him the boon whereby if Shiva would whisper the Rama taraka mantra in a dying man's ear, he would be liberated. The Uttara Tapaniya discusses the Om mantra but without predominance over the Ramamantra. The Upanishad also prescribes mantras to worship goddess Sita, Rama's three siblings (Bharata, Lakshmana, and Shatrughna), and also Hanuman.

The Rama uttara Tapaniya sections borrow from ancient Upanishads such as the Jabala Upanishad, and the Mandukya Upanishad. The Om mantra, asserts the text in section 2 of Uttara, is identical to Brahman called satcitananda. In section 3, the text describes the four states of consciousness, asserting that the fourth and the highest inner state is one of "certitude of one own self, the calm, the one without a second, that which is the Atman which should be known" and which is same as Brahman and Rama. The one who realizes that "I am Atman", "I am Rama", and "I am Brahman" has realized the supreme light, the Ramabhadra, the bliss of liberation, states the Upanishad.

== See also ==
- Maithili Maha Upanishad
- Nrisimha Tapaniya Upanishad
- Mahanarayana Upanishad
- Narayana Upanishad
