= Maha Upanishad =

One of the minor Upanishads of Hinduism

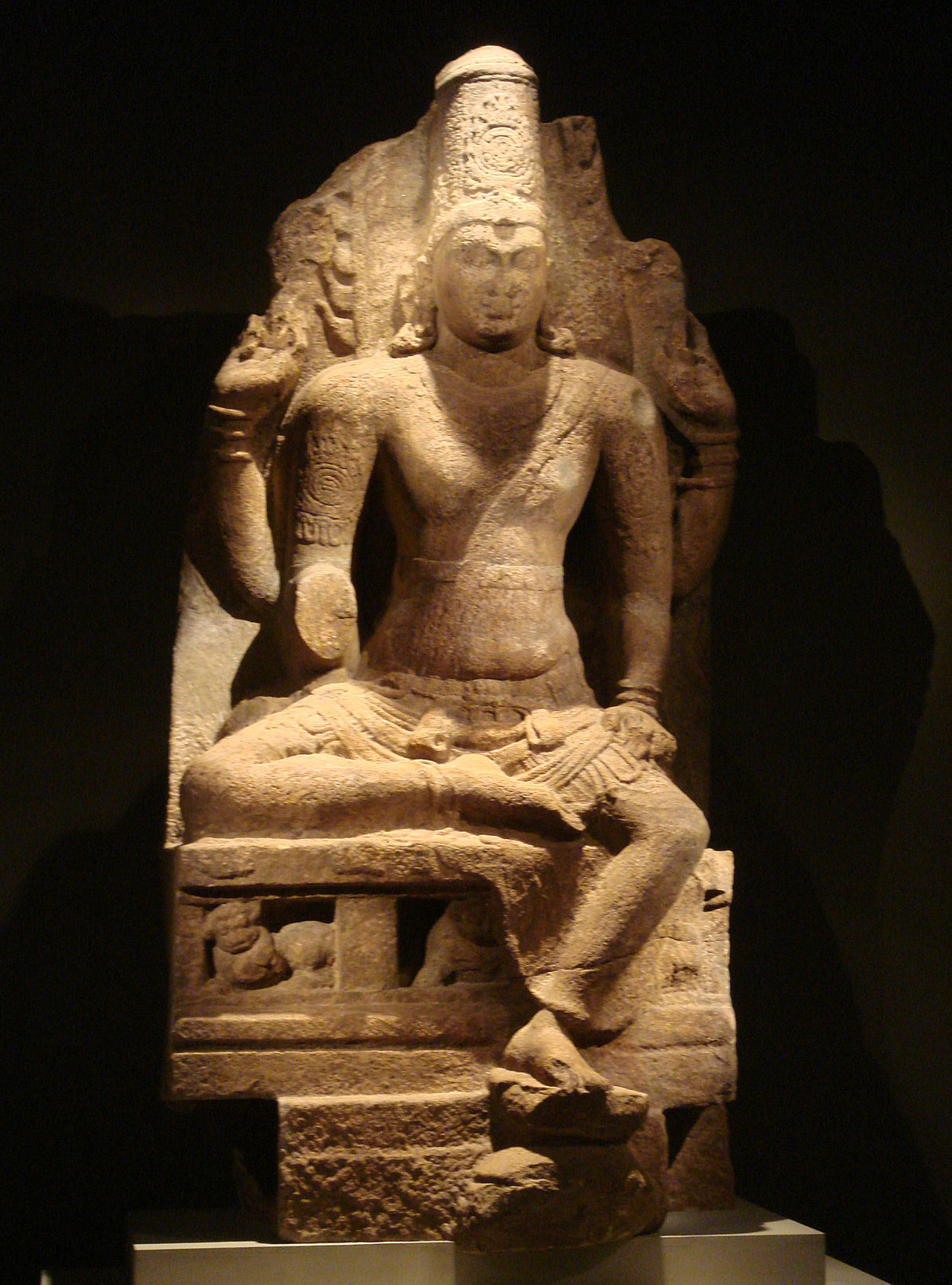
- The text discusses Narayana (Vishnu)
- Devanagari: महा
- IAST: Mahā
- Title means: Great
- Type: Vaishnava
- Linked Veda: Samaveda
- Chapters: 6
- Verses: 549
- Philosophy: Vaishnavism

The Maha Upanishad (Sanskrit: महा उपनिषद्, IAST: Mahā Upaniṣad) is a Sanskrit text and is one of the minor Upanishads of Hinduism. The text is classified as a Samanya Upanishad.

The text exists in two versions, one attached to the Atharvaveda in some anthologies, and another attached to the Samaveda. The Atharvaveda version is shorter, and in prose. The Samaveda version is partly in poetic verses.

The Vaishnava Upanishad describes Vishnu as the highest being, and above Brahma. Both groups of texts, however, use reverential words of all Hindu gods, and assert them to be the same Atman-Brahman. The Upanishad presents a syncretism of Vaishnava and Vedanta ideas, and is notable for its teaching of "Vasudhaiva Kutumbakam", or "the world is one family".

== History ==
The date or author of Maha Upanishad is unknown, but Deussen considers it to be the most ancient of Vaishnava Upanishads attached to the Atharvaveda.

Manuscripts of this text are also found titled as Mahopanishad. In the Telugu language anthology of 108 Upanishads of the Muktika canon, narrated by Rama to Hanuman, it is listed at number 61. In the collection of Upanishads under the title Oupanekhat, put together by Sultan Mohammed Dara Shikhoh in 1656, consisting of a Persian translation of 50 Upanishads and who prefaced it as the best book on religion, the Maha is listed at number 16. Dara Shikoh's collection was in the same order as found in Upanishad anthologies popular in north India. In the 52 Upanishads version of Colebrook this Upanishad is listed at 9. In the Bibliothica Indica edition of Narayana the Upanishad is also listed at 9 in his list of 52 Upanishads popular in South India.

== Contents ==
The Upanishad presents Vishnu as the highest being, above Samkhya principles, above Ishana, and above Brahma. This Upanishadic text competes with Shaiva Upanishads, such as the Atharvashikha Upanishad and Atharvashiras Upanishad, which asserts Shiva as higher than Rudra, Vishnu and Brahma. Both groups, however, use profusely reverential words in describing all three – Brahma, Vishnu and Rudra, and identify them as manifestations of the same universal Atman-Brahman (ultimate reality).

The world is a family

One is a relative, the other stranger,
say the small minded.
The entire world is a family,
live the magnanimous.

Be detached,
be magnanimous,
lift up your mind, enjoy
the fruit of Brahmanic freedom.

— Maha Upanishad 6.71–75

The text references and uses fragments of Vedic hymns, such as from Taittiriya Brahmana section 2.2 and Shatapatha Brahmana section 6.1, but reformulates them in the image of Vishnu. He as Brahman is the origin of the universe, asserts the text, from whom arose Purusha, Atman and Prakriti (nature, substances, body) of Samkhya philosophy. For the last two concepts, the Upanishad uses the term Tejas. Thereafter, from Narayana, arose Ishana and Brahma, the Om, the cosmic chants and songs, the meters of literature, then the Vedas. The text shares some verses with another Vaishnava text – the Mahanarayana Upanishad, and a Shaiva Upanishad – the Atharvashiras.

The longer version of the text, which is attached to Samaveda, includes the shorter version as first part and then presents more text. It goes on to describe the path to liberation and bliss as one of realizing one's soul, of Brahman as knowledge and Vishnu.

A liberated person is Jivanmukta, states the text, and is characterized by one who is untouched whether joy or grief befalls him, doesn't get angry at anyone or anything, neither is mean to anyone nor fears anyone, is free from desire and non-desire, is introverted and likes his own company, is silent and without arrogance, acts without envy or agitation, is detached and functions without cravings, is quiet and calm, active and full in spirit. He is self-restrained, driven by inquiry, in company of good people, studies the Shastras, asks, "Who am I? How did Samsara develop?" The drink of immortality for him, states the Upanishad, is his delight in the Self (soul, Atman), experiencing the joy of his own inner awareness and nature.

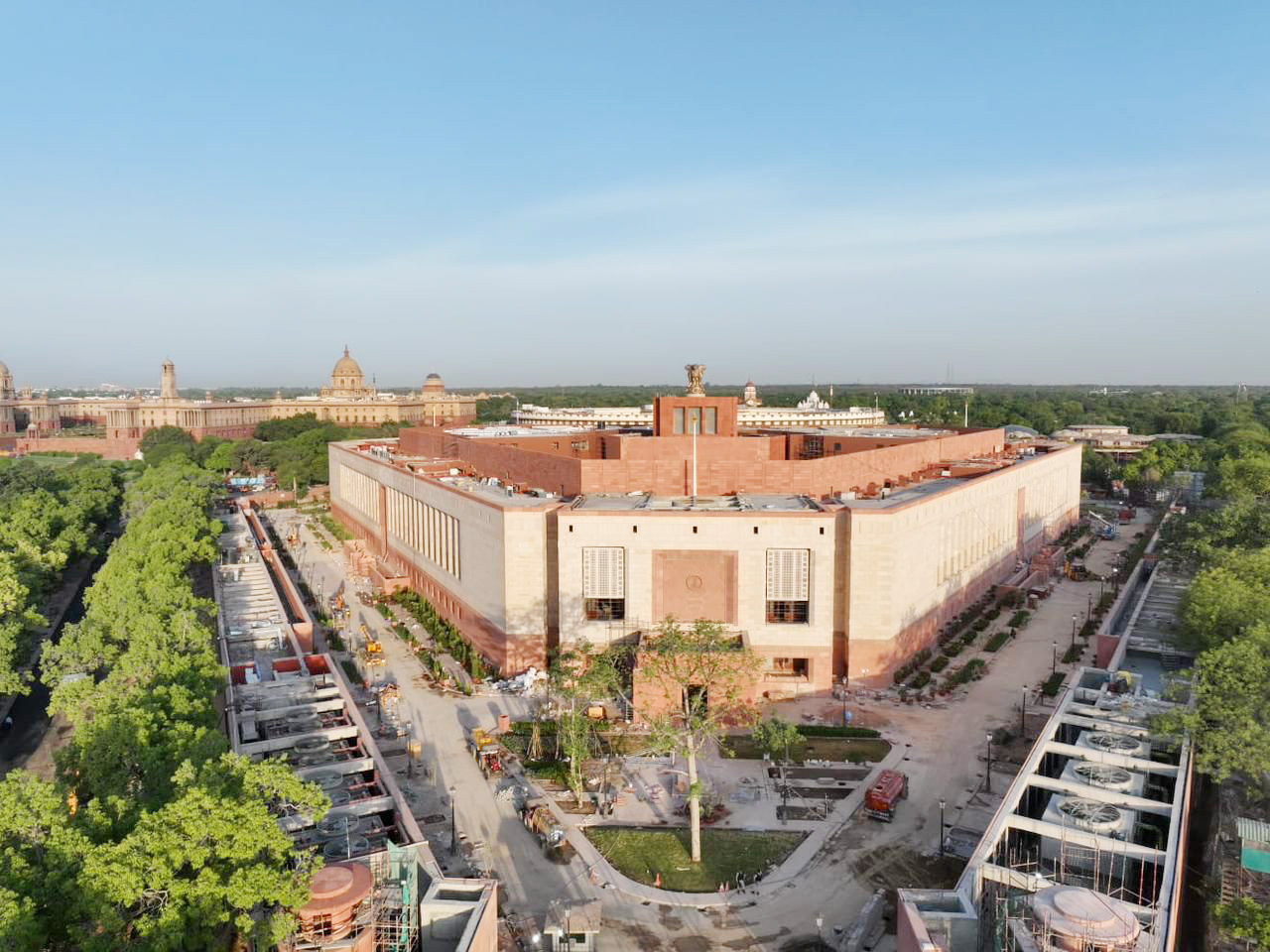
The "world is a family" verse of Maha Upanishad is engraved in the entrance hall of the Parliament Of India.

The Vishnu-focussed text is notable for describing Shiva as the trident holding one, states Deussen, who possesses beauty, truth, chastity, austerity, renunciation, intelligence and mastery.

The Upanishad is oft-quoted ancient text for the credo, "Vasudhaiva Kutumbakam" (Sanskrit: वसुधैव कुटुम्बकम्), or "the world constitutes but one family". This verse of Maha Upanishad is engraved in the entrance hall of the parliament of India.

The text has been influential in the major Hindu literature that followed it. The popular Bhagavata Purana, composed sometime between 800 CE and 1000 CE, the most translated of the Purana genre of literature in Hinduism, for example, calls the Vasudhaiva Kutumbakam adage of the Maha Upanishad, as the "loftiest Vedantic thought". This adage, according to Chung Tan, influenced the Chinese culture and is an example of "dynamics of boundarylessness of a Himalaya Sphere phenomenon, viz. Chinese culture with Indian input".

== See also ==
- Atmabodha Upanishad
- Maithili Maha Upanishad
- Atharvashiras Upanishad
- Narayana Upanishad
- Nrisimha Tapaniya Upanishad
