= Gopala Tapani Upanishad =

Hindu Vaishnava text

Gopala-Tapani
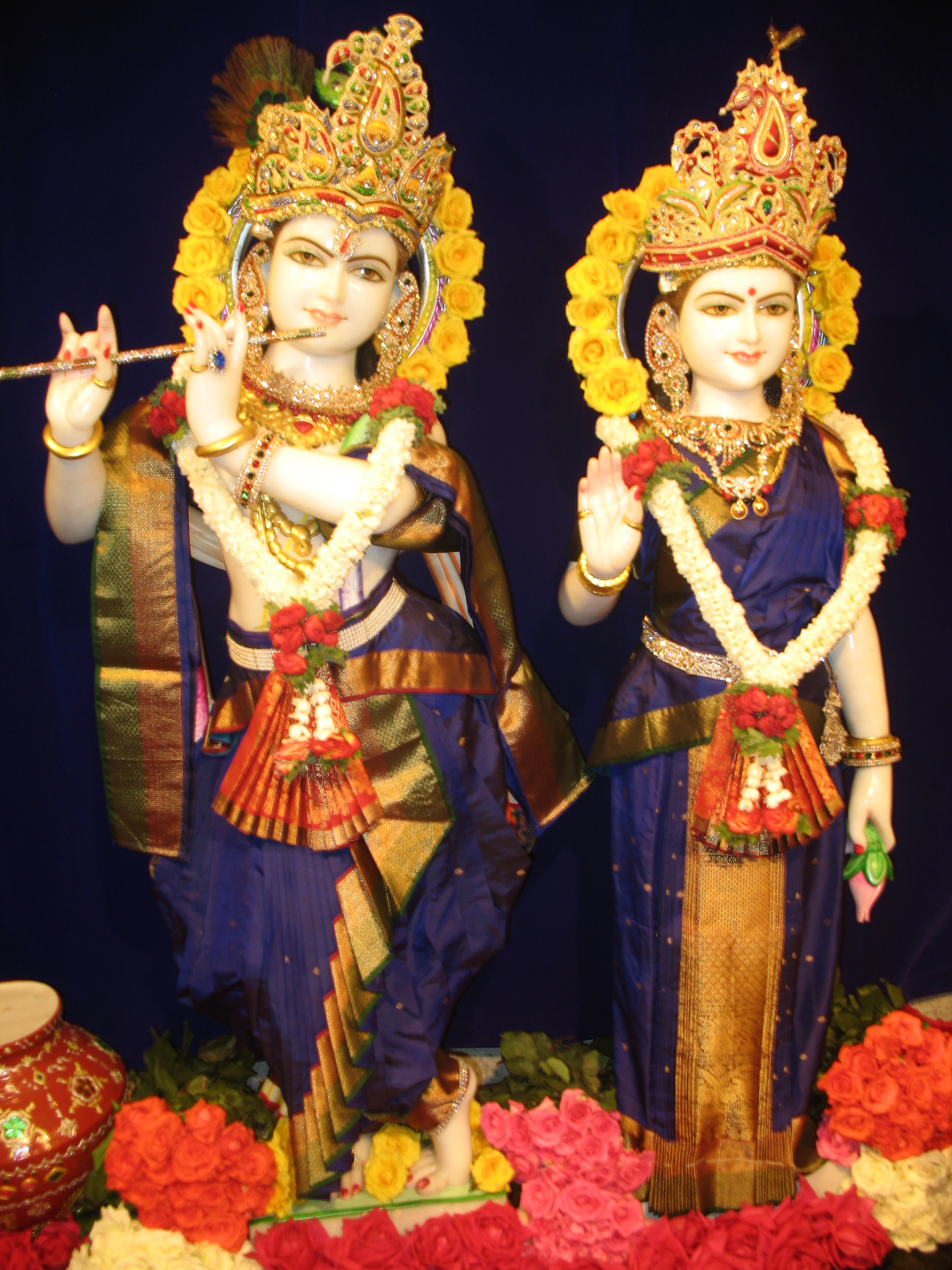
- Significant Upanishad on Radha Krishna
- Devanagari: गोपालतापिन्युपनिषत्
- IAST: Gopāla-Tāpanī
- Title means: Surrender to Krishna
- Date: Uncertain, est. 8th AD to 6th century AD
- Type: Vaishnava
- Linked Veda: Atharvaveda
- Chapters: 9

The Gopala Tapani Upanishad (Gopāla-tāpanī Upaniṣad) is a Sanskrit text, and one of the later Upanishads attached to the Atharvaveda. The Gopāla-Tāpanī is one of the four Tāpinī Upanishads (Nṛsiṁha, Rāma, Tripurā, and Gopāla).

This Vaishnava Upanishad belongs to the Tandya school of the Atharvaveda. Like the Gopala-Tapani Upanishad is an anthology of texts that must have pre-existed as separate texts, and were edited into a larger text by one or more ancient Indian scholars. The precise chronology of Gopala-Tapani Upanishad is uncertain, and it is variously dated to have been composed by the 8th to 6th century AD in India. Farquhar, in his survey of the Tāpanī Upaniṣads, specifically places the Gopāla-Tāpanī after the Nṛsiṁha-Tāpanī (itself completed by the 7th century), indicating a post-7th-century development that crystallized into its surviving form by the medieval era. Because it appears as an anthology of pre-existing devotional verses edited into nine chapters, its precise date remains uncertain, but all evidence—manuscript colophons, intertextual references, and its place among the Tāpīnī Upaniṣads—points to a medieval Vaishṇava milieu rather than to the early Upaniṣadic age.

It is one of the largest Upanishadic compilations, and has eight Prapathakas (literally lectures, chapters), each with many volumes, and each volume contains many verses. The volumes are a motley collection of stories and themes. As part of the poetic and chants-focused atharvaveda, the broad unifying theme of the Upanishad is the importance of speech, language, song and chants to man's quest for knowledge and salvation, to metaphysical premises and questions, as well as to rituals.

The Gopala-Tapani Upanishad is notable for its lifting metric structure, its mention of ancient cultural elements such as musical instruments, and embedded philosophical premises that later served as foundation for Vedanta school of Hinduism. It is one of the most cited texts in later Bhasyas (reviews and commentaries) by scholars from the diverse schools of Hinduism.

== Etymology ==
ॐ

The wise and enlightened sages declare
that the pleasure potency
of God, Sri Radha, and all living beings
are also contained in Om.

— Gopala-Tapani Upanishad, II.56

The Sanskrit word tāpanīya in the context of these Upanishads is not clear. The word is found in four different forms: tapanīya, tāpanīya, tāpinī, tāpanī. Tāpanī is the most common form used in titles and references, but this appears to be an abbreviated form of the more correct tāpanīya, which appears in the texts themselves. According to Monier-Williams, tāpanīya ("gold") is described to be the name of a school of the Vājaseyani Saṁhitā that produced the four Upanishads bearing this name. This assumes that they come from a common source something disputed by others, who believe that the three other works were written on the model of the Nṛsiṁha-tāpanī as a result of the success enjoyed by that work in bringing legitimation a particular ancient tradition containing Nṛsiṁha mantra. Deussen reads tapanīya, which means "that which must be heated" or "gold". It also has the meaning of "self-mortification".

The process of self-purification is often compared to smelting gold, which is heated repeatedly in fire to remove any impurities. Deussen thus explains the term is as follows: "Tapanam (austerity) is burning pain-suffering or ascetic self-sacrifice; Nṛsiṁha-tapanam thus means ascetic self-surrender to Nṛsiṁha. Therefore Nṛsiṁha-tapanīya Upanishad is "the doctrine concerning the ascetic surrender to Nṛsiṁha."

== Dating ==
Farquhar dates it to have been composed after Nṛsiṁha-tāpanī Upanishad, which he estimates to be complete by the 7th century. He states that the first of the Tāpanīya Upanishads is believed to be the Nṛsiṁha, which served as the model for the others which took this name. But it is not sure whether the text was of 7th century because it has no mention in Shankara's works. The Gopala-Tapani text was extensively commented by the 16th-century scholar Jiva Goswami placing the two limits on its composition century. The 14th-century scholar Vidyaranya commented on Tapani series of Upanishad, so it is possible the text existed by then.

== Contents ==
According to Swami Tripurari's commentary, he subject of the Gopala Tapani Upanishad is the deity Krishna, who is referred to as the knowledge identified by the Vedanta. The text purports to be the source of spiritual practices, which would lead to the realisation that Krishna is the highest truth, and the goal (prayojana) of the text is to foster devotion towards the deity, for the sake of devotion. The text also contains an account of Radha, the principal consort of Krishna, and thus also reverenced by all Radha-worshipping sects.
