= Rama Rahasya Upanishad =

Hindu Vaishnava text

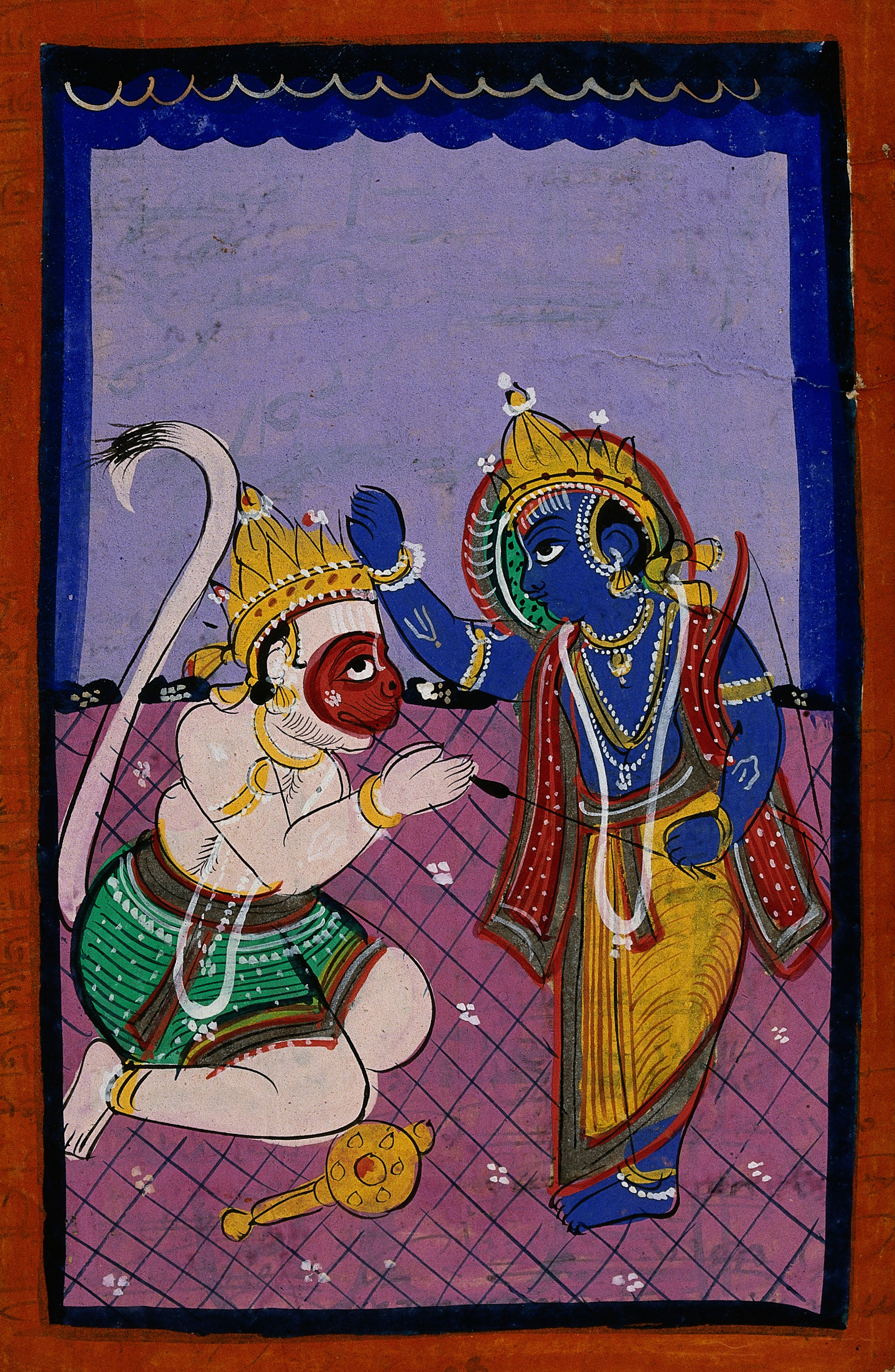
- Drawing of Hanuman kneeling before Rama
- Devanagari: राम रहस्य उपनिषद
- IAST: Rāma Rahasya Upaniṣad
- Title means: The Upanishad of Rama's secret
- Date: 9th- to 11th- century
- Type: Vaishnava
- Linked Veda: Atharvaveda
- Chapters: 5
- Philosophy: Vaishnavism, Vedanta

The Rama Rahasya Upanishad (राम रहस्य उपनिषत्) is a minor Upanishadic text written in Sanskrit. It is one of the 31 Upanishads attached to the Atharvaveda, and classified as one of the 14 Vaishnava Upanishads.

This is a late Upanishad exclusively devoted to the Hindu god Rama, dated to have been composed in the modern era. The text is largely recited by Hanuman, who states that Rama is identical to the supreme unchanging reality Brahman, same as major Hindu deities, and the means to satcitananda and liberation. The text also includes sections on Tantra suggesting the Bīja mantra based on Rama.

== Development ==
Neither the author nor the date of composition of this text is known. Moriz Winternitz makes a passing mention in a footnote stating that it belongs to the same period as the other Rama-related Upanishads.

Not much is known about this text, states Ramdas Lamb, and it is to a large extent different from the other Rama-related Upanishads. The Ramarahasya Upanishad, along with the Rama tapaniya Upanishad, presents Rama as an avatar of Vishnu, and these are therefore classified as Vaishnava Upanishads. The Christian missionary in colonial British India, Farquhar included it in the list of 123 Upanishads. The Vedanta philosophy had a major influence on this and other Rama-related Upanishads, states Lamb, along with the 12th century Rama-related Agastya Samhita text.

In the Telugu language anthology of 108 Upanishads of the Muktika canon, narrated by Rama to Hanuman, it is listed at number 54. The Upanishad is not part of the anthology of 52 popular Upanishads in north India by Colebrooke, nor is it found in the Bibliotheca Indica anthology of popular Upanishads in south India by Narayana.

The first chapter of the text, states Paul Deussen, is also known as Hanumadukta-Ramopanishad.

== Contents ==
Who is Rama

I Think of that Rama
Who lives in Ayodhya
Who is decorated with gems
Who sits beneath a golden canopy
Whose doorways are festooned with mandana flowers.
He, who is seated on a throne
Surrounded by celestial vehicles
Who is revered by rishis
Who has Sita on the left
Who is served by Lakshmana;
Who is the blue complexioned,
Whose face is tranquil,
Who is adorned with ornaments

—Rama Rahasya Upanishad.

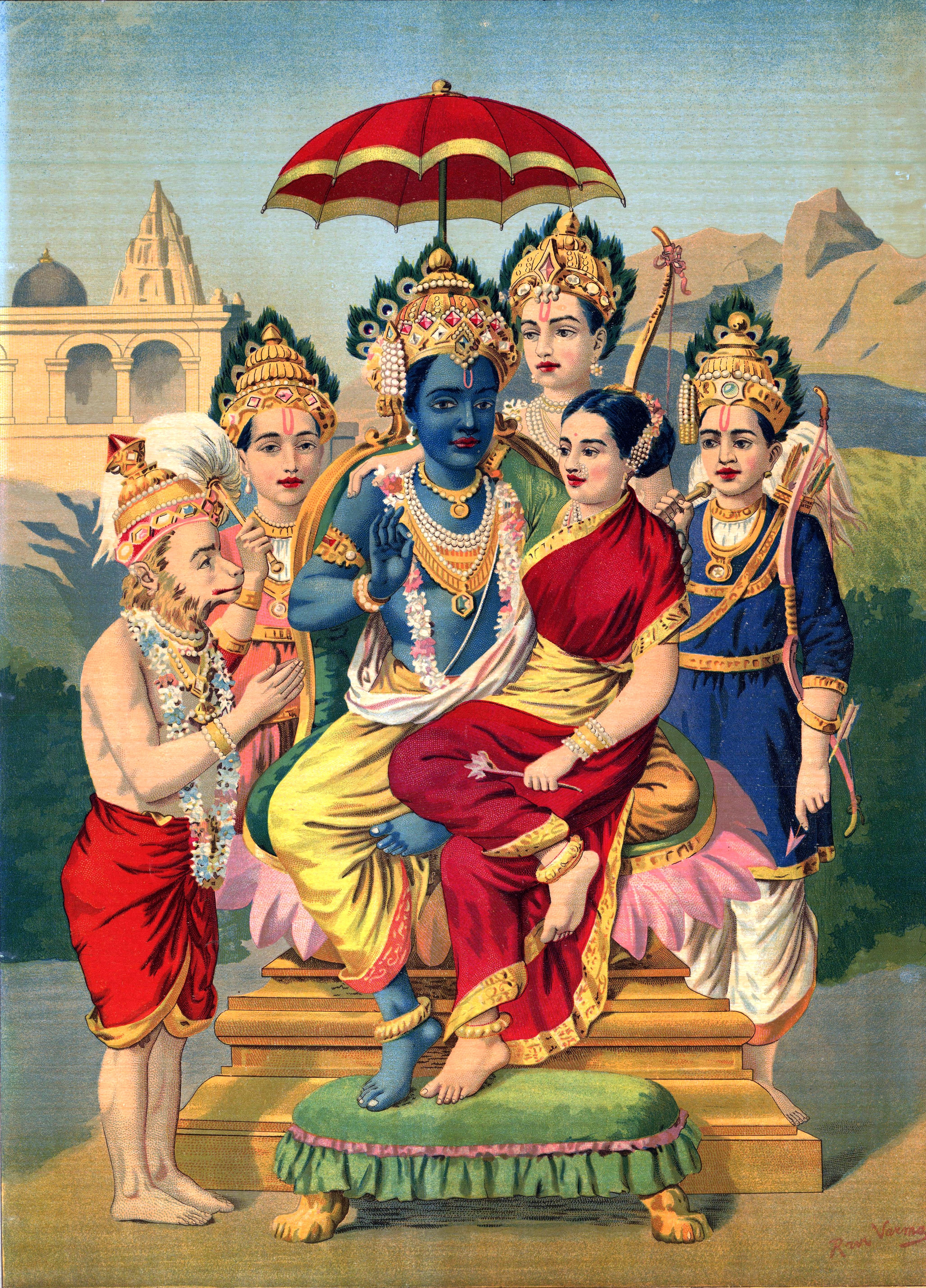
Ramapanchayan, the five associated with Rama – Sita, Lakshmana, Bharata, Shatrughna, and Hanuman.

The narration of the text is presented as replies by Hanuman to the questions posed to him by many rishis seeking true knowledge. Hanuman states god Rama is the supreme reality, the Brahman and the Atman (soul), and he is the medium to attain moksha or emancipation. The text presents goddess Sita, the wife of Rama, as the cause of creation, and Hanuman as the completely absorbed example and ideal devotee of Rama. Together, Rama and Sita are asserted to be the source of all existence.

Rama is, asserts the text, same as other major Hindu deities. The other divinities mentioned in the text, states Dalal, as angas (aspects) of Rama are Ganesha, Surya, Chandra, and other avatars of Vishnu (Narayana, Narasimha, Vasudeva, Varaha). The characters of the Hindu epic Ramayana such as Lakshmana, Shatrughna, Bharata, and Vibhishana are also asserted by the text to be aspects of Rama. The Upanishad adds that goddesses such as Saraswati (the goddess of learning) and Durga (a fierce form of Mahadevi) are manifestations of Rama, the supreme truth and reality, symbolized as the Pranava (Om).

Hanuman advocates the importance of reciting the six syllabled Rama Mantra, Rama Ramaya namah. In section 1.13, states Lamb, Hanuman informs Vibhishana that constant recitation of the Ramanama (Rama's name) mantra removes the bad karma of a person accrued from committing the sin of killing his father, his mother, his guru, or a Brahmin. The text also recommends the reading of the Rama Gita.

The text enumerates many mantras, assigning them tantric powers, which it forms by combining root mantras. All these mantras are associated with Rama, but each formulation connotes a different role. The syllables in the mantras vary from 1 to 24, and evolves mantras like Om Ramaya hum phat swaha and Om srim Rama Dassarathaya Sita vallabbhaya sarvabhita daya namah. Out of these mantras those with two to six syllables are claimed by the text to be most beneficial, states Lamb. In contrast, Mahadevan interprets the text as glorifying eight syllable mantra, in the form "Sri Ramah, sa-ra-nam ma-ma" or "Sri Rama is my refuge". The single syllable Rama signifies the supreme reality Brahman, whereas split into two syllables "ra – ma", it emancipates according to the text.

The Upanishad text has verses that relate to dhyana or the contemplation of Rama. The text, states Dalal, asserts that the "rahasya" or secret of "energising the body" (Nyasa) is to recite Rama mantra it discloses while touching different body parts.

The Upanishad, states Dodiya, asserts that the roots of syllables "र, आ, मा" or "r+aa+ma" form the word Rama. In relation to the evolution of the mantras र r is stated to indicate the incarnation of the Satcitananda and as 'r' is a consonant it is indivisible and hence beyond maya or Mayatita, implying the unchanging reality that is Brahman. The syllable आ (Ā) suggests svarupa, which is influenced by the maya (mayavishista) element or principle. This mantra Rama is the Bija or the seed of the Rama Mantra. Hence Rama as Brahman, states Dodiya, is endowed with maya, or the observed empirical universe.

== See also ==
- Maithili Maha Upanishad
- Devi Upanishad
- Jabala Upanishad
- Nirvana Upanishad
- Yogatattva Upanishad
