= Om Namo Narayanaya =

Hindu mantra

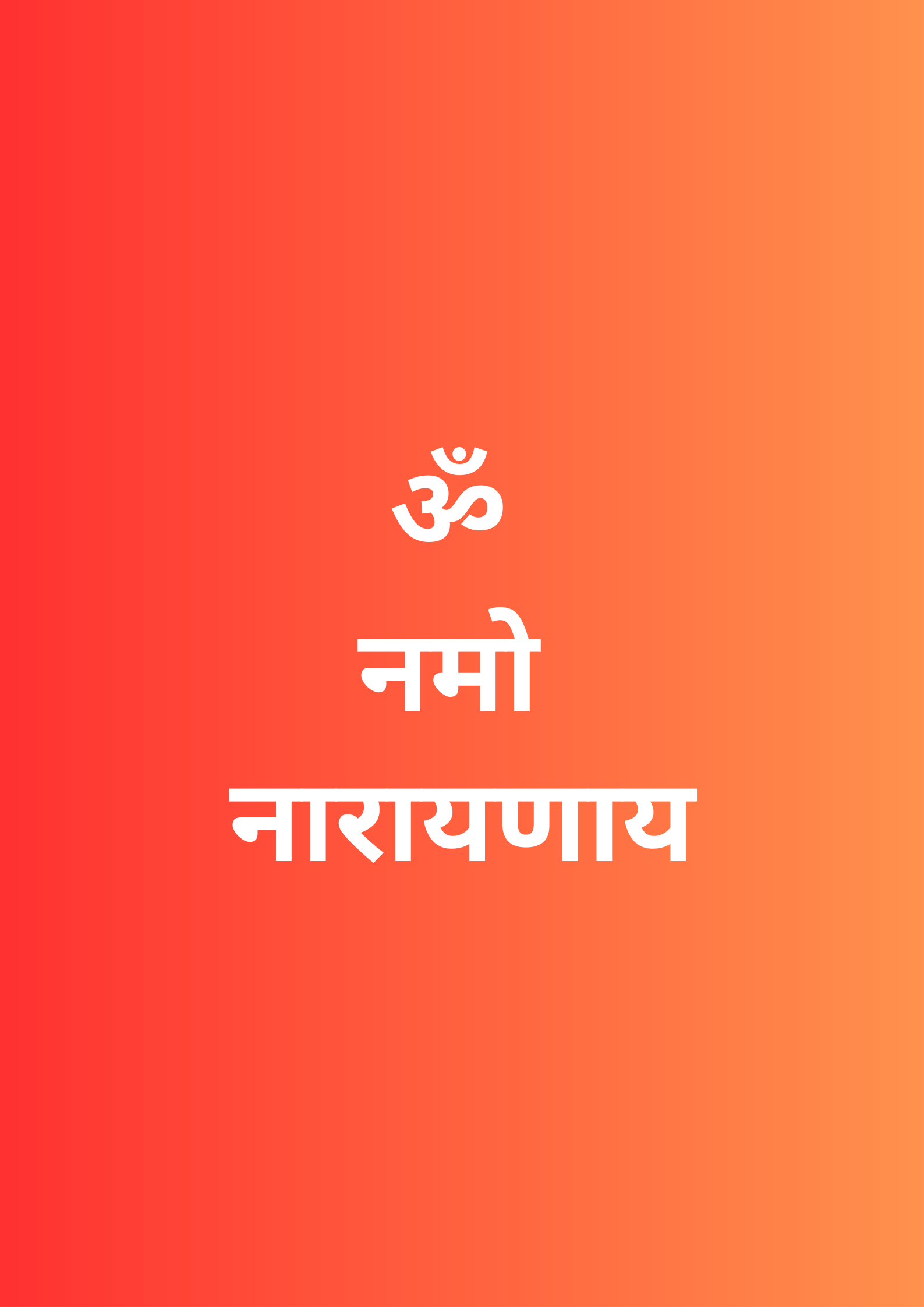
Om Namo Narayanaya written in the Devanagari script.

Om Namo Narayanaya (Sanskrit: ॐ नमो नारायणाय, romanized: Om Namo Nārāyaṇāya, lit. 'I bow to the Ultimate Reality, Narayana'), also referred to as the Ashtakshara (eight syllables), and the Narayana Mantra, is among the most popular mantras of Hinduism, and the principal mantra of Vaishnavism. It is an invocation addressed to Narayana, the god of preservation, the form of Vishnu who lays in eternal rest beneath the cosmic waters.

== Literature ==
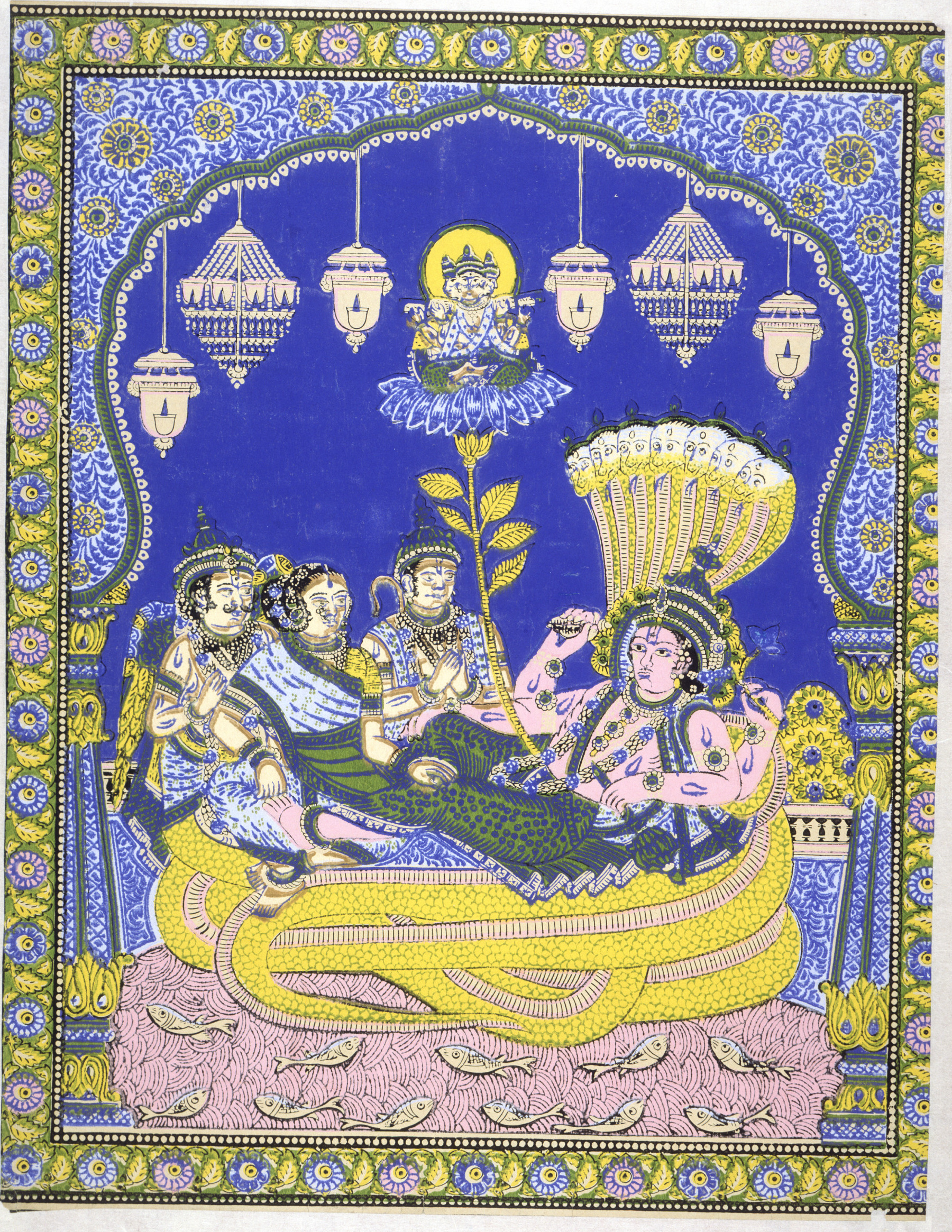
A painting of Narayana

Om Namo Narayanaya is mentioned in Hindu literature, especially in the Upanishads and the Puranas. The mantra is described in these scriptures as being invoked to attain salvation from the deity and is also given as an instruction to devotees of Narayana in performance of rituals.

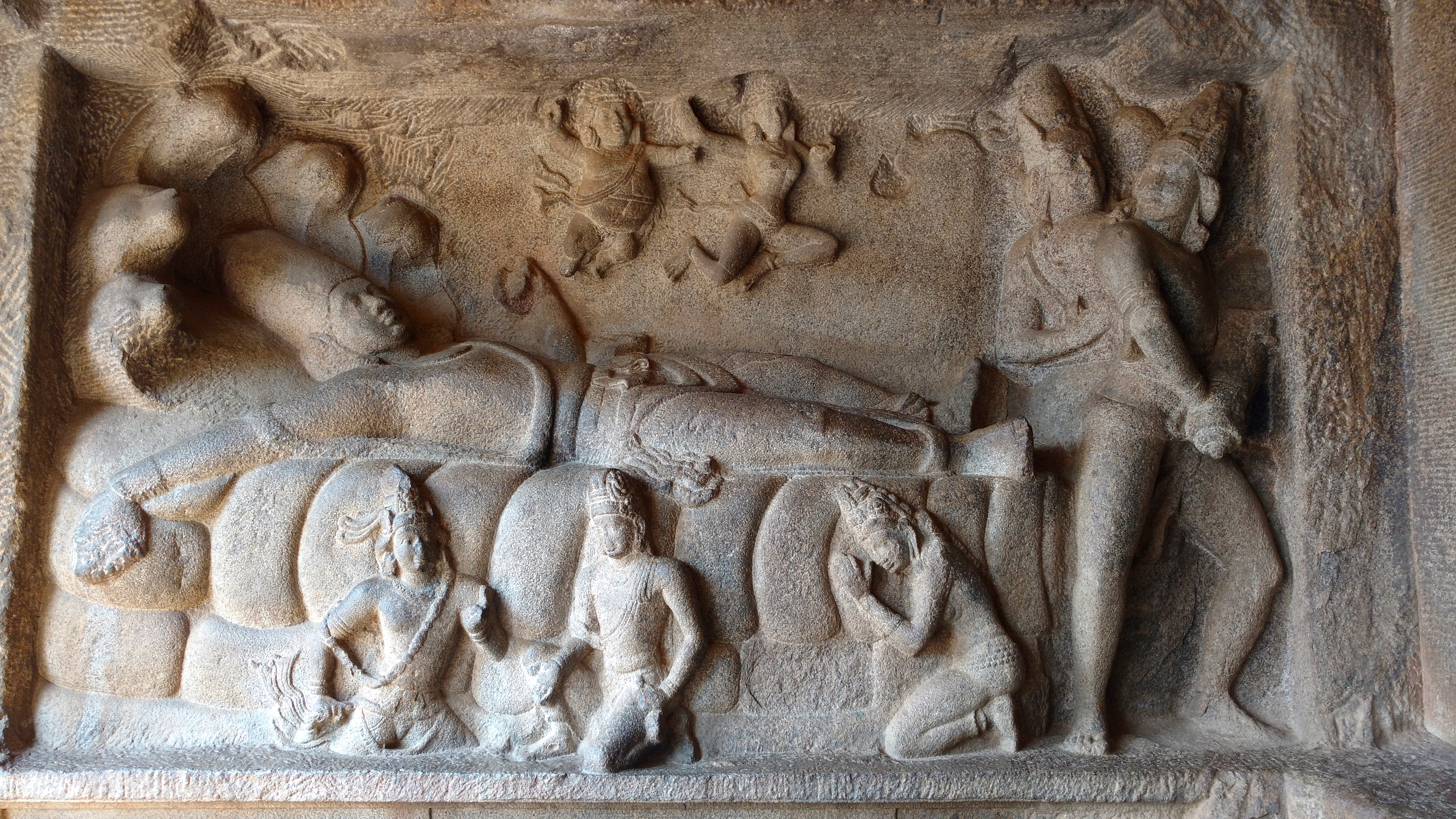
Sculpture of Narayana in Mahabalipuram often dated (630–668 AD)

According to the Tarasara Upanishad, Om is the divine sacred syllable that represents the nature of Brahman, the Ultimate Reality that is unchanging and eternal. Namo is translated from Sanskrit as “to bow to” or “to pay homage”. Narayanaya may be translated as "to or of Narayana"; Nara refers to “water”, and anaya means “abode” or “shelter.” Narayana is regarded as an epithet of Vishnu, whose celestial realm is Vaikuntha, amid the cosmic waters of creation. Hence, it is a mantra that is associated with submission to God, accepting one's existence in the grand design, as well as seeking the protection of Vishnu.

The sage Yajnavalkya provides an explanation of the breakdown of the mantra's components:

Syllable	Symbolism	Invocation
Om	Atma	Brahma
Na/Ma	Prakrti	Vishnu/Rudra
Na/Ra/Ya/Na/Ya	Parabrahman	Ishvara/Virata/Purusha/Bhagavan/Paramatma

In the Vaishnava Upanishads, the Samashti-Yantra, the words described over Ananta, the seat of Vishnu, bear the ashtakshara.

The Narada Purana furnishes the following details regarding the chanting of this mantra: If a man performs the japa of chanting the mantra in the banks of the river Ganga, he would achieve moksha.

The Narayana Upanishad also remarks upon the mantra, stating that one attains Vaikuntha by chanting it.

The mantra is also often associated with Prahlada, a daitya devotee of Narayana, and the son of Hiranyakashipu. Despite repeated instruction by his instructors to chant the invocation, "Hiranyaya namaha" (glory to Hiranya), the devotee sticks to his favoured mantra, "Om Namo Narayanaya Namaha" (glory to Narayana).

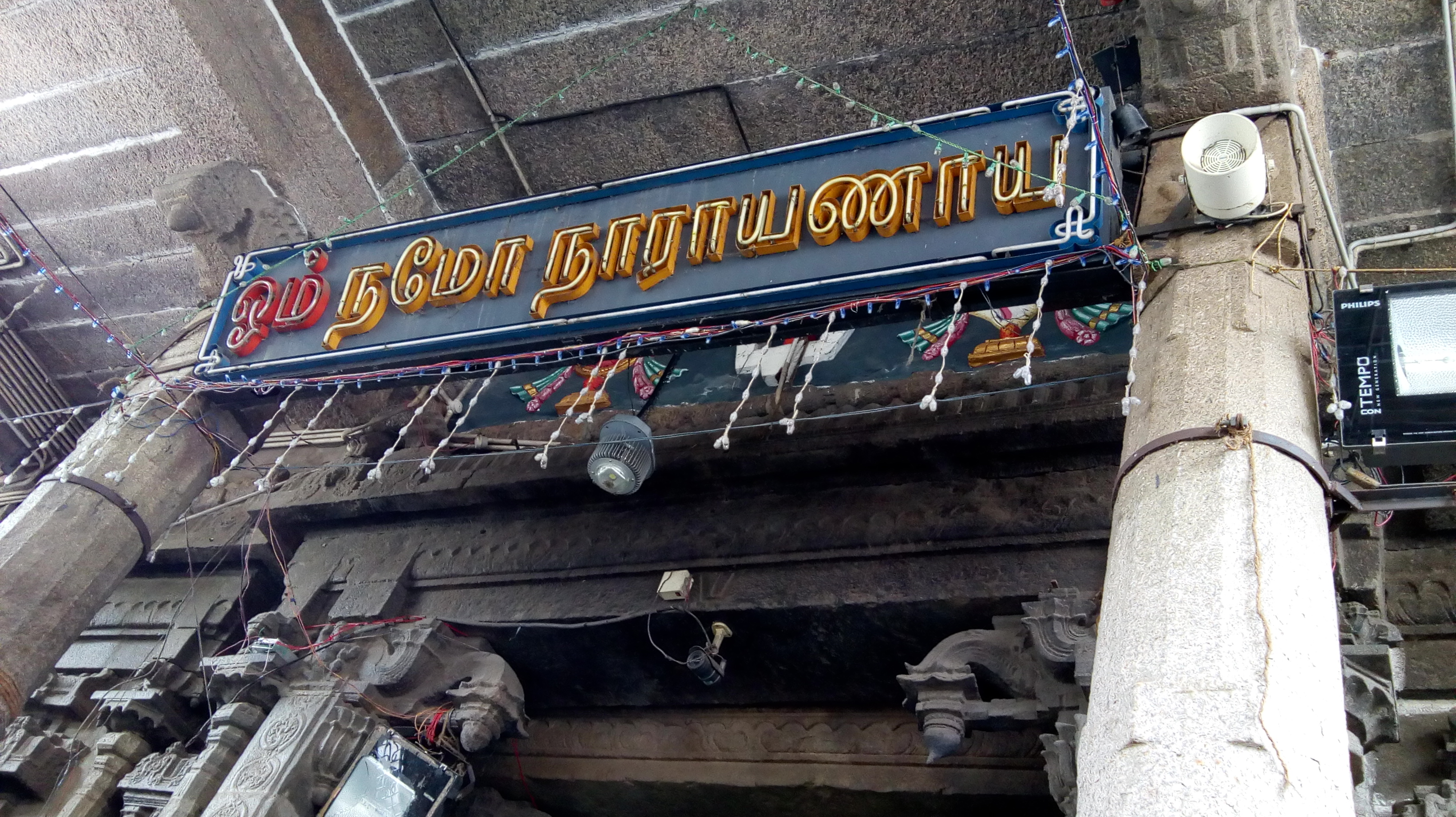
Om Namo Narayanaya written in Tamil, Parthasarathy Perumal temple, Chennai

== Historical usage ==
Periyalvar, an Alvar, a poet-saint of the Sri Vaishnava tradition, invoked the mantra to convince the Pandya king of Madurai of the supremacy of Vishnu. He proclaimed that Narayana was the supreme deity, all-merciful and all-bountiful, and that he was the path towards the achievement of bliss.

According to the Sri Vaishnava narrative, the theologian Ramanuja is regarded to have revealed this secret mantra from the tower of the Tirukoshtiyur temple to the crowd gathered outside the shrine.

== Significance ==
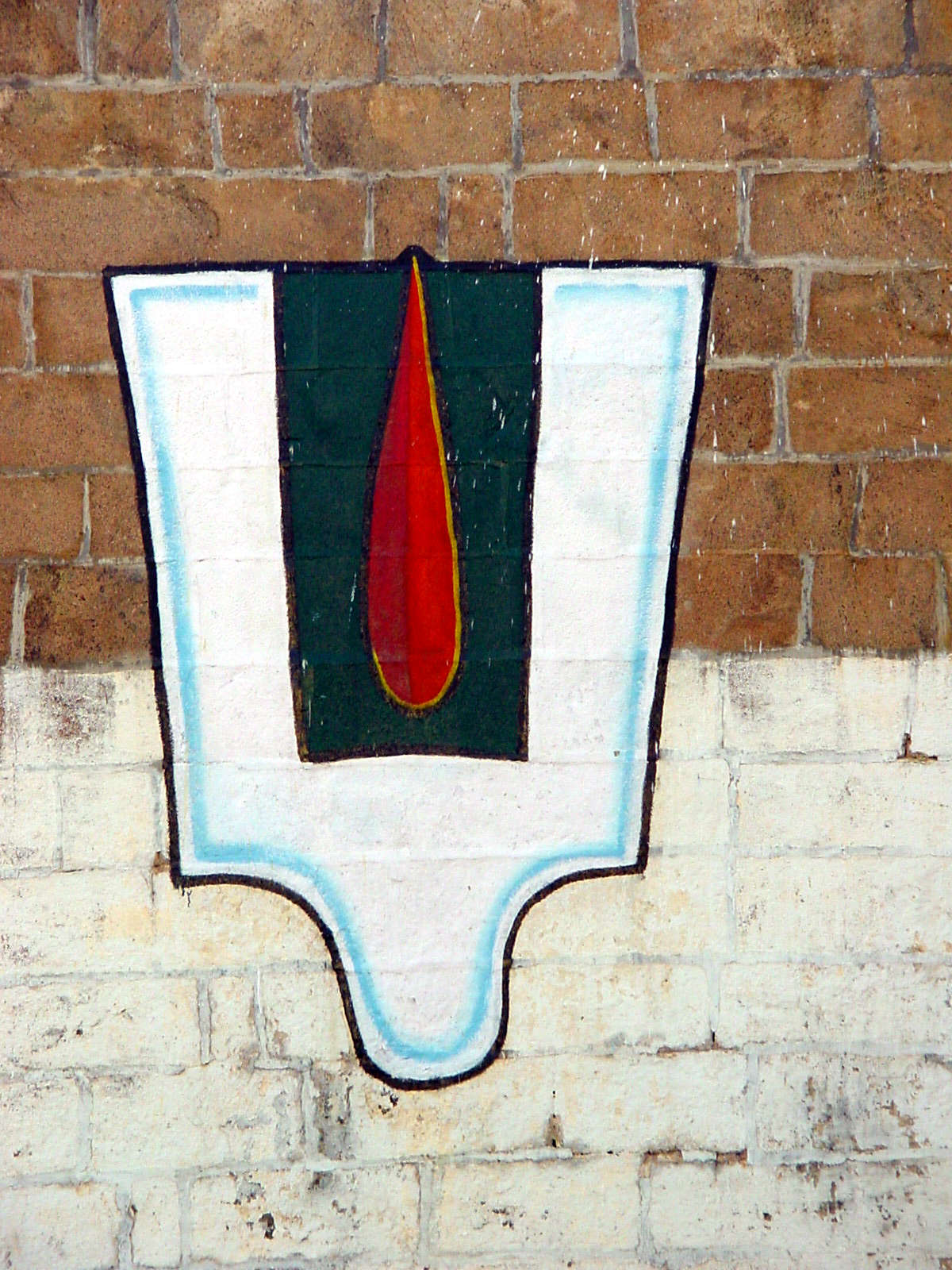
The Urdhva Pundra, worn by adherents of Narayana. Wall painting in Ranganathaswamy Temple, Srirangam.

The mantra is held in supreme regard by the Vaishnavas, the adherents of Vishnu who make up the dominant denomination within Hinduism. The religious significance of chanting this incantation is described in the Tarasara Upanishad, stating that he who chants the mantra is purified by the deities Agni, Vayu, Surya, as well as Shiva. The merit attained by chanting it is described to be the equivalent of reciting the Itihasas, the Puranas, and all the mantras a hundred thousand times. It is also stated to be the equivalent of reciting the Gayatri mantra a hundred thousand times, and the syllable 'Om' ten thousand times. It is stated to be powerful enough to purify ten of one's immediate ancestors, and ten of one's immediate descendants. Finally, it states that the recitation of the mantra allows one to attain the state of union with Narayana.

The Linga Purana states that chanting the mantra is the means for achieving all objects, and hence must be invoked for every occasion.

In Sri Vaishnavism, the chanting of the mantra was part of the panchasamskaras of Ramanuja, the five sacraments that initiated him into the tradition by his guru, Periyanambi.

According to Vaishnava theology, it is held that whoever studies this ashtakshara of Narayana and recites it constantly attains a full life, supremacy over men, enjoys the pleasures of royalty, and becomes the master of all souls. Whoever chants this mantra is held to attain moksha, according to the teachings of the Samaveda.

== See also ==
- Om Namo Bhagavate Vasudevaya
- Om Namah Shivaya
- Hare Krishna
