= Om Namo Bhagavate Vāsudevāya =

Hindu mantra

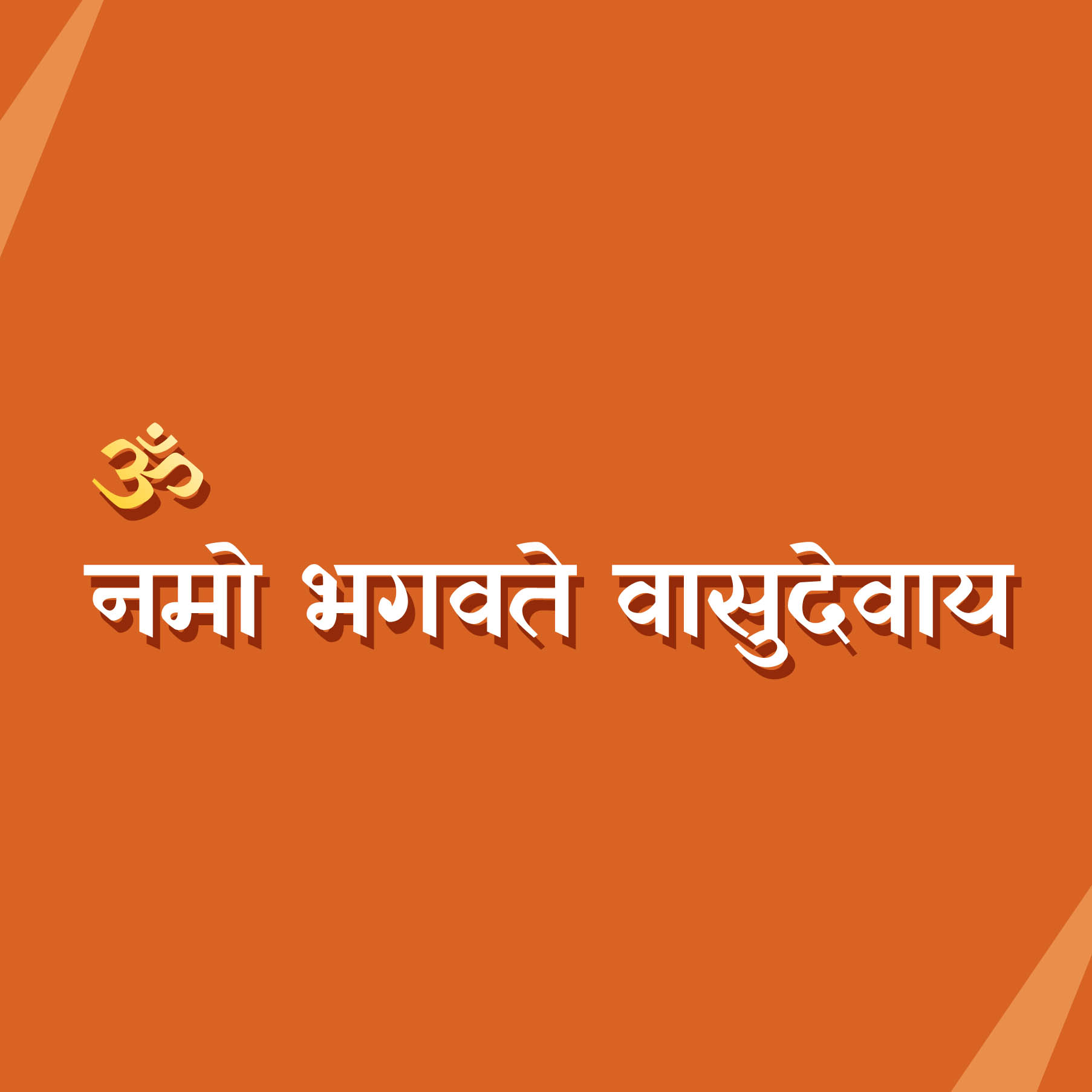
Om Namo Bhagavate Vāsudevaya in Devanagari

Om Namo Bhagavate Vāsudevāya (Sanskrit: ॐ नमो भगवते वासुदेवाय, lit. 'I bow to God Vāsudeva';) is one of the most popular mantras in Hinduism and, according to the Bhagavata tradition, the most important mantra in Vaishnavism. It is called the Dvadasakshari Mantra, or simply Dvadasakshari, meaning the "twelve-syllable" mantra, dedicated to Vishnu or Krishna.

== Origin ==
Bhagavatism, one of the traditions that was assimilated with what would become Vaishnavism, revered the Vrishni heroes, primary among them being Vāsudeva (Krishna). It may be concluded that the mantra was first associated with the reverence of Vāsudeva as the supreme deity before he was syncretised with Vishnu, after which it became an invocation of both deities.

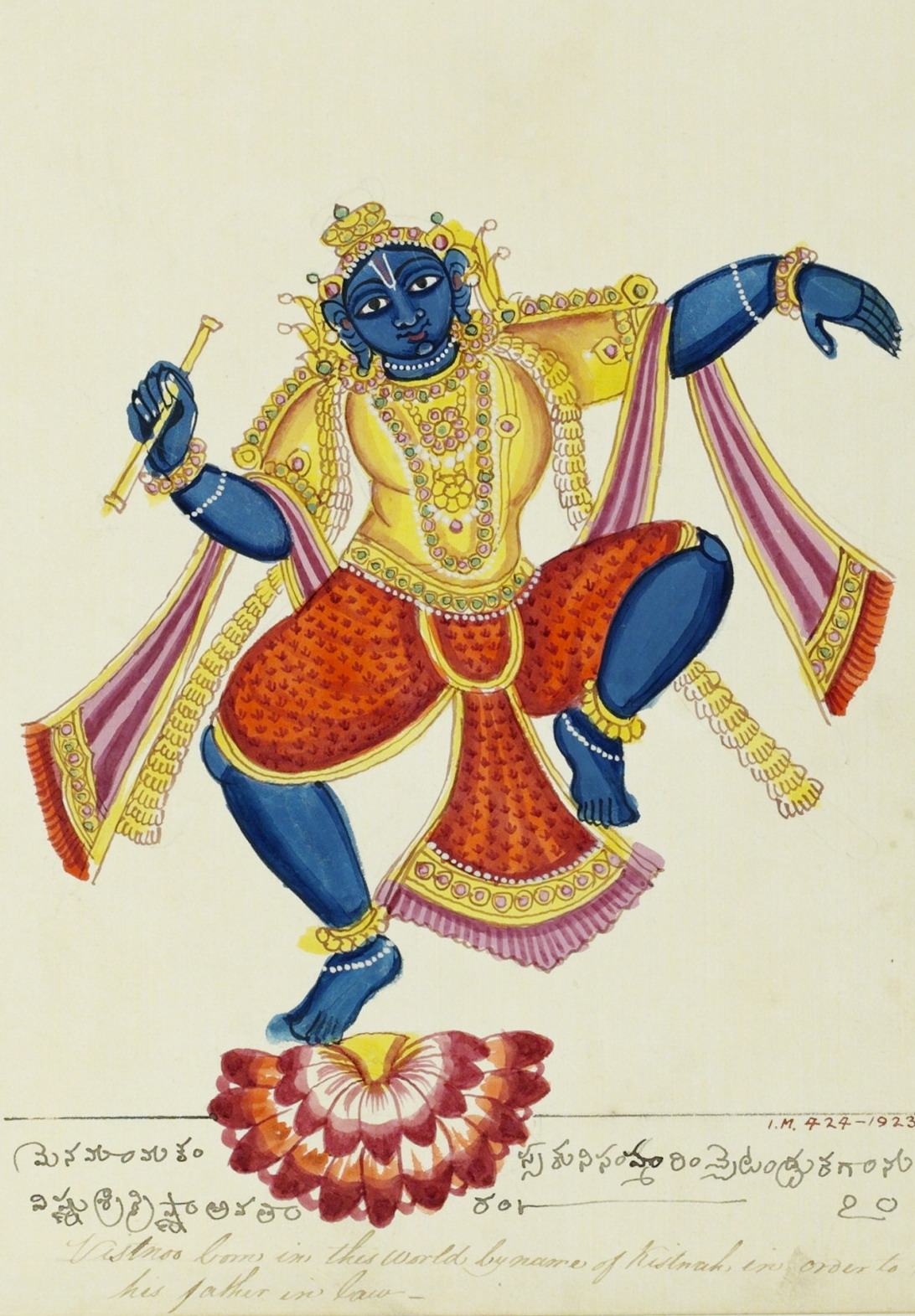
Vāsudeva (Krishna) dancing on a lotus. Telugu

== Meaning ==
Om Namo Bhagavate Vasudevaya means "Om, I bow to Lord Vāsudeva or Lord Vishnu".

Term	Devanagari	Listen	Meaning
Om	ॐ	Om	Refers to the Supreme Infinite Spirit or Person. Om represents the Shabda Brahman.
Namo	नमो (namo)	Namo	Salutation, worship, a common spoken valediction or salutation originating from the Indian subcontinent. 'Namo' नमो is the Sandhi form of 'namas' नमस्, neuter nominative singular.
Bhagavate	भगवते	Bhagavate	1. God in Sanskrit, someone who is considered God (or equally powerful, merciful). 'Bhagavate' भगवते is the dative of 'bhagavat' भगवत्.; 2. Bhagavate is one who is becoming divine.
Vāsudevāya	वासुदेवाय	Vāsudevāya	Vasu means "Life in all beings" Devaya means "God". This means God(life/light) who lives in all beings. Krishna is also known as Vāsudeva (Krishna), because He was the son of Vasudeva. In the Bhagavad-Gita, Arjuna called Krishna by the name Vaasudeva multiple times. 'Vāsudevāya' वासुदेवाय is the dative of 'vāsudeva' वासुदेव.

== Details ==
Om Namo Bhagavate Vāsudevaya means "prostration to Vasudeva", who is variously understood as Krishna. The Vaishnava Upanishads state that this mantra is described on the Sudarshana Chakra:

Similarly, in the twelve petals, is placed the Vasudevan (the twelve-syllabled Mantra, Om Namo Bhagavate Vasudevaya).

— Vaishnava Upanishads

The Sharada Tilaka, a Tantric text, states:

"Dvadasharno mahamantrah pradhano Vaishnavagame"— The twelve lettered mantra is the chief among vaishnava mantras.

Similarly, this is referred to as the ultimate mantra in the Shrimad Bhagavatam. This twelve syllable mantra is known as a mukti (liberation) mantra, and a spiritual formula for attaining freedom. The mantra can also be found in the Vishnu Purana.

In the epic Mahabharata, Dhruva chanted this mantra in his penance as ordered by sage Narada.

== In popular culture ==
- Swami Vivekananda used this phrase multiple times in his lectures and letters.
- Dayananda Saraswati wrote a book named "Om Namo Bhagavate Vasudevaya".
- Willow Smith and Jahnavi Harrison put this mantra into their song Gajendra from their collaborative album RISE.

== See also ==
- Hare Krishna (mantra)
- Svayam Bhagavan
- Om Namo Narayanaya
- Om Tat Sat
- Hari Om
- Vishnu Sahasranama
