= Pranahuti (Pre-meal ritual) =

Hindu ritual

Pranahuti (Sanskrit: प्राणाहुति, romanized: Prāṇāhuti) is a ritual of reciting a mantra (hymn), offering food that is about to be consumed, to the five pranas. It is mostly practiced by orthodox Brahmins before consuming their meal. It is also performed at the time of Śrāddha, a ritual of homage to one's ancestors.

== Description ==
The prescribed manner of recitation of the Pranahuti is explained in the Mahanarayana Upanishad. The first step of this recitation includes this mantra:

śraddhāyāṁ prāṇe niviṣṭo'mṛtaṁ juhomi
śraddhāyāmapāne niviṣṭo'mṛtaṁ juhomi
śraddhāyāṁ vyāne niviṣṭo'mṛtaṁ juhomi
śraddhāyāmudāne niviṣṭo'mṛtaṁ juhomi
śraddhāyāɱ samāne niviṣṭo'mṛtaṁ juhomi
brahmaṇi ma ātmāmṛtatvāya

— Mahanarayana Upanishad, Section 69, 1

Firm in my religious faith, I have offered this oblation of ambrosia into Prana with reverence: O Prana, increase the power of my in-breath by this food! Firm in my religious faith, I have offered this oblation of ambrosia into Apana with reverence: O Apana, increase the power of my out-breath with this food! Firm in my religious faith, I have offered this oblation of ambrosia into Vyana with reverence: O Vyana, increase the power of my diffused breath with this food! Firm in my religious faith, I have offered this oblation of ambrosia into Udana with reverence: O Udana, increase the power of my up-breath with this food! Firm in my religious faith, I have offered this oblation of ambrosia into Samana with reverence: O Samana, increase the power of my middle breath with this food!

According to the author's commentary, this mantra is repeated and a small quantity of water is sipped before an adherent starts eating. Anything that the devotee considers precious or valuable is placed in a container and covered. A small quantity of water taken in is supposed to be an upastarana (seat), on which subsequent morsels are placed. After sipping the water, oblations are offered.
