= Vasudhaiva Kutumbakam =

Sanskrit phrase from the Maha Upanishad meaning "the world is one family"

Vasudhaiva Kutumbakam (Sanskrit: वसुधैव कुटुम्बकम्) is a Sanskrit phrase found in Hindu texts such as the Maha Upanishad, meaning, "the world is one family".

Vasudhaiva Kutumbakam is a Sanskrit phrase meaning 'the world is one family'. It reflects the Indian philosophy of global unity and interconnectedness. This concept has significantly influenced India's approach to foreign policy, emphasizing cooperation and mutual respect among nations. The recent conclave, ‘Vasudhaiva Kutumbakam ki Oar', highlighted the importance of this ethos in addressing global challenges and fostering international trust. Participants, including Acharya Yugbhushansuri and former high commissioner Yashwardhan Kumar Sinha, discussed the need for India to take a leadership role in promoting this philosophy to navigate current geopolitical complexities and enhance global stability.

Multipolarity refers to a global system where multiple countries hold significant power and influence, as opposed to a unipolar or bipolar world. The recent conclave in Ahmedabad emphasized the necessity of establishing robust rules and regulations to ensure a successful multipolar world. Alok Bansal, director of India Foundation, highlighted that a multipolar world requires cooperation among nations to maintain global stability and address complex geopolitical challenges. The discussions underscored India's potential role as a reliable leader in fostering a multipolar international order.

== Verse ==
The full verse from the Maha Upanishad (VI.71–73) in three scripts:

Script	Text
Devanagari	अयं निजः परो वेति गणना लघुचेतसाम् । उदारचरितानां तु वसुधैव कुटुम्बकम् ॥
IAST transliteration	ayaṃ nijaḥ paro veti gaṇanā laghucetasām / udāracaritānāṃ tu vasudhaiva kuṭumbakam //
Gujarati	હળવા મનવાળા લોકો એ જ માને છે કે આ તેમનું પોતાનું છે કે બીજા કોઈનું. જે લોકો ચારિત્ર્યમાં ઉમદા છે, તેમના માટે પૃથ્વી તેમનો પરિવાર છે.
Telugu	అయం నిజః పరో వేతి గణనా లఘుచేతసామ్ । ఉదారచరితానాం తు వసుధైవ కుటుమ్బకమ్ ॥

== Meaning ==
Language	Meaning
English	"This is mine, that is theirs" — such is the reckoning of the narrow-minded. For those of noble character, the entire world is one family.
Hindi	"यह मेरा है, वह उसका है" — ऐसा संकुचित सोच वाले मानते हैं। उदार हृदय वालों के लिए तो पूरी पृथ्वी ही एक परिवार है।
Gujarati	"આ મારું છે, એ તેનું છે" - સંકુચિત મનના લોકો એવું જ માને છે. વિશાળ હૃદય ધરાવતા લોકો માટે, આખી પૃથ્વી એક પરિવાર છે.
Telugu	"ఇది నాది, అది వారిది" అనేది సంకుచిత బుద్ధి గలవారి లెక్క. ఉదారమైన స్వభావం గలవారికి ఈ భూమి మొత్తం ఒక కుటుంబమే.

== Translation ==
The phrase Vasudhaiva Kutumbakam (Sanskrit: वसुधैव कुटुम्बकम्) consists of: Vasudha; Eva (transl. 'Is Thus'); and Kutumbakam (transl. 'Family').

=== Word-by-word analysis ===
The following table gives a word-by-word breakdown (padaccheda) of the full verse as it appears in the Maha Upanishad (VI.71–73):

Sanskrit (Devanagari)	Transliteration (IAST)	Telugu script	English	Hindi	Telugu meaning
अयम्	ayam	అయమ్	this	यह	ఇది
निजः	nijaḥ	నిజః	one's own	मेरा / अपना	తనవాడు
परः	paraḥ	పరః	the other / stranger	पराया	పరాయివాడు
वा	vā	వా	or	अथवा	లేదా
इति	iti	ఇతి	thus / so said	इस प्रकार	అని
गणना	gaṇanā	గణనా	reckoning / counting	गणना / सोच	లెక్క / ఆలోచన
लघुचेतसाम्	laghucetasām	లఘుచేతసామ్	of the narrow-minded	संकुचित सोच वालों का	సంకుచిత బుద్ధి గలవారి
उदारचरितानाम्	udāracaritānām	ఉదారచరితానామ్	of the noble-hearted	उदार हृदय वालों का	ఉదారస్వభావుల
तु	tu	తు	but / however	किन्तु	కానీ
वसुधा	vasudhā	వసుధా	the earth	पृथ्वी	భూమి
एव	eva	ఏవ	indeed / verily	ही	మాత్రమే
कुटुम्बकम्	kuṭumbakam	కుటుమ్బకమ్	family	परिवार	కుటుంబము

The verse in Telugu script reads: అయం నిజః పరో వేతి గణనా లఘుచేతసామ్ । ఉదారచరితానాం తు వసుధైవ కుటుమ్బకమ్ ॥

== History ==
अयं निजः परो वेति गणना लघुचेतसाम्। (ayaṃ nijaḥ paro veti gaṇanā laghucetasām)
उदारचरितानां तु वसुधैव कुटुम्बकम्॥ (udāracaritānāṃ tu vasudhaiva kuṭumbakam)

The original Verse appears in Chapter 6 of the Maha Upanishad Vi.71-73., and it is considered the most important moral value in the Indian society. This verse of Maha Upanishad is engraved in the entrance hall of the Parliament Of India.

The World Is A Family

One Is A Relative, The Other Stranger,
Say The Small Minded.
The Entire World Is A Family,
Live The Magnanimous.

Be Detached,
Be Magnanimous,
Lift Up Your Mind, Enjoy
The Fruit Of Brahmanic Freedom.

— Maha Upanishad 6.71–75

Subsequent shlokas go on to say that those who have no attachments go on to find the Brahman (The One Supreme, Universal Spirit That Is The Origin And Support Of The Phenomenal Universe). The context of this verse is to describe as one of the attributes of an individual who has attained the highest level of spiritual progress, and one who is capable of performing his worldly duties without attachment to material possessions.

== Influences ==
The Maha Upanishad has been influential in the major Hindu literature that followed it. The teachings of Bhagavata Purana calls the Vasudhaiva Kutumbakam adage of the Maha Upanishad, as the "Loftiest Vedantic Thought".

The ancient idea of Vasudhaiva is considered relevant today. It promotes a global perspective and prioritizes the greater good over individual or family interests. It encourages considering the welfare of others, fostering global solidarity and responsibility on various issues, including climate change, sustainable development, peace, and tolerance of differences. Vasudhaiva Kutumbakam is not merely human related but includes all life forms. Humans, animals, plants, and the entire natural world. This interconnectedness is not limited by boundaries or borders; it encompasses the entire cosmos.

Dr N. Radhakrishnan, former director of the Gandhi Smriti and Darshan Samiti, believes that the Gandhian vision of holistic development and respect for all forms of life; nonviolent conflict resolution embedded in the acceptance of nonviolence both as a creed and strategy; were an extension of the ancient Indian concept of Vasudhaiva Kutumbakam.

== Modern use ==
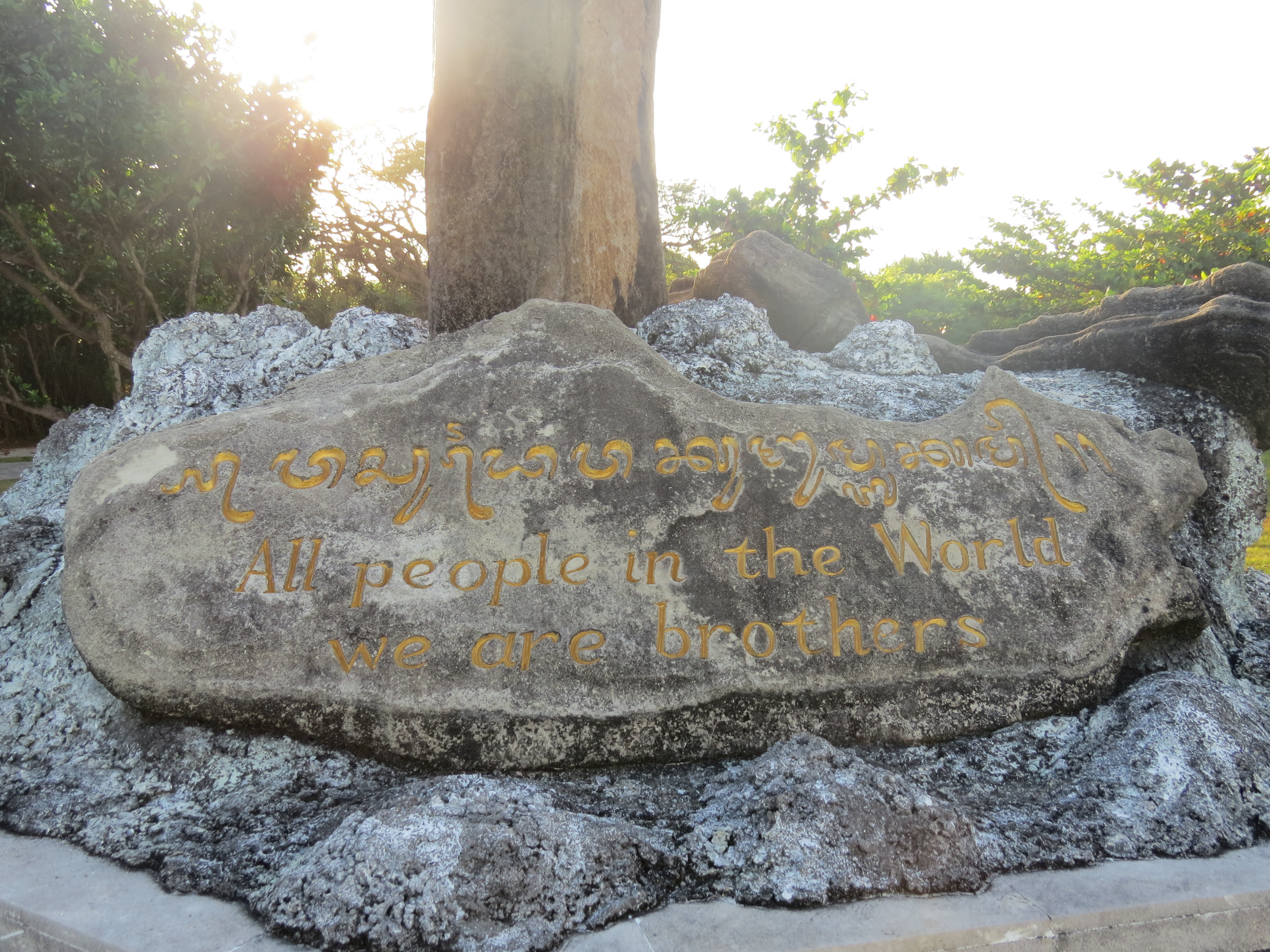
Inscription in Bali, Indonesia. The phrase Vasudhaiva Kutumbakam engraved in Balinese script, loosely translated below as "All the people in the world, we are brothers".

India's Prime Minister Narendra Modi used this phrase in a speech at World Culture Festival, organized by Art of Living, adding that "Indian culture is very rich and has inculcated in each one of us with great values, we are the people who have come from Aham Brahmasmi to Vasudhaiva Kutumbakam, we are the people who have come from Upanishads to Upgraha.(Satellite)."

It was used in the logo of the 7th International Earth Science Olympiad, which was held in Mysore, India in 2013. It was designed to emphasize on the integration of the Earth’s subsystems in the school curriculum. It was designed by R. Shankar and Shwetha B. Shetty of Mangalore University.

The theme and the logo for India’s G20 Presidency from December 1, 2022, till November 30, 2023 has a mention of “Vasudhaiva Kutumbakam” or “One Earth-One Family-One Future”. The logo was selected after scrutiny of 2400 pan-India submissions invited through a logo design contest. However, due to opposition from China, which claimed that Sanskrit is not one of the six official languages of the United Nations, the phrase failed to appear in most official G20 documents.

The phrase has been adopted by Jyot, an organisation hosting international conclaves on ethical global governance.

In December 2024, a two-day conclave titled Vasudhaiva Kutumbakam Ki Oar 3.0 was held at Gitarth Ganga in Ahmedabad, organised by Jyot Foundation under the guidance of Jainacharya Yugbhushansuri, bringing together legal scholars, geopolitical experts, and thought leaders to discuss a world order based on the principles of Vasudhaiva Kutumbakam.

In January 2026, the Jyot India Foundation, with support from the Ministry of External Affairs, Government of India, held the fourth edition of the Vasudhaiva Kutumbakam Ki Oar conclave (themed Sankraman Kaal) at August Kranti Maidan, Mumbai, from 16 to 22 January, bringing together jurists, diplomats, and policymakers to examine India's constitutional frameworks through the lens of ancient Indian civilisational values.

== See also ==
- Universalism
- Unity In Diversity
- Religious Syncretism
- Hinduism
- We Are The World
- Yaadhum Oore Yaavarum Kelir
