= Vaishnava Upanishads =

Upanishads that adhere to the Vishnu-centric tradition

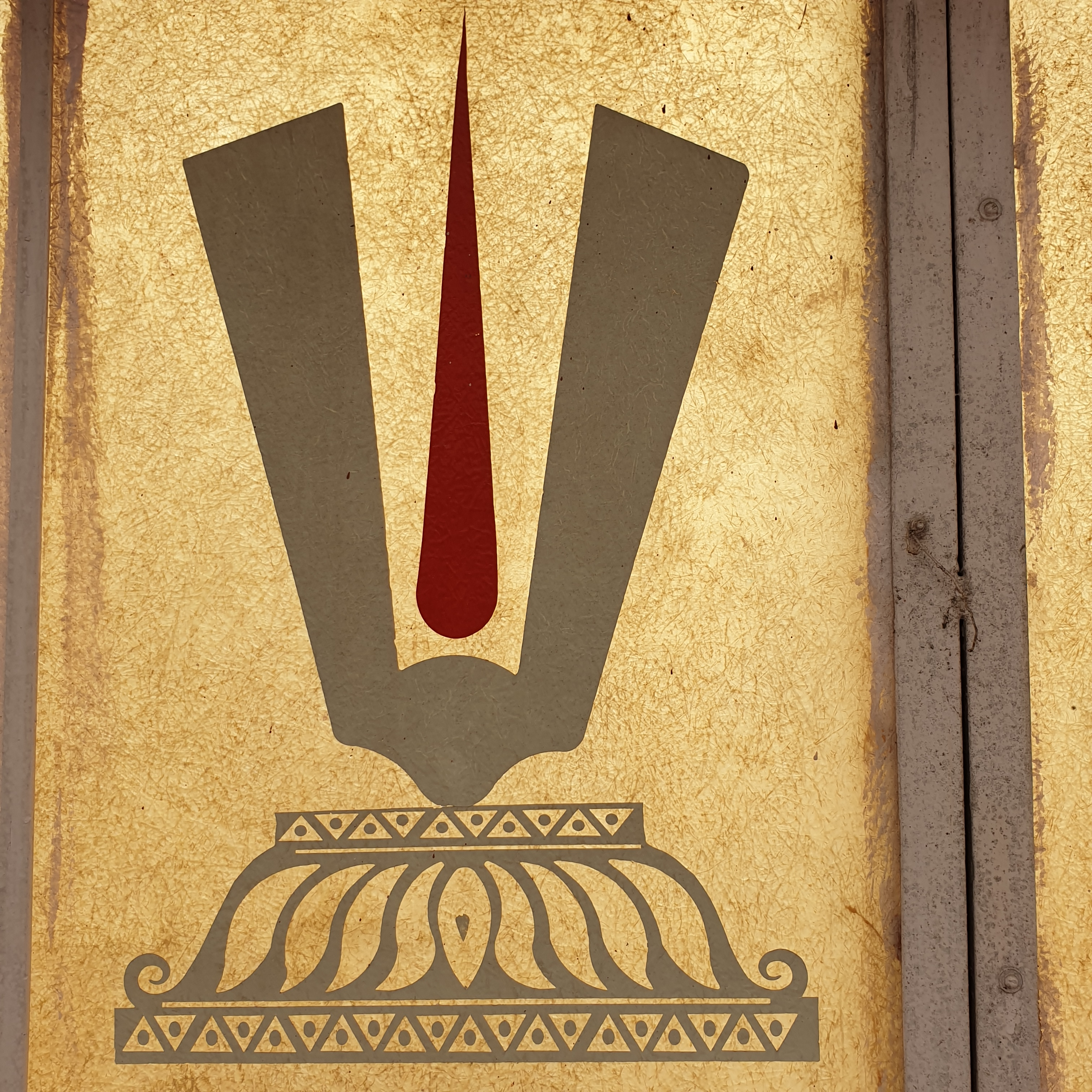
Icon of the Urdhva Pundra, a symbol of Vaishnavism

The Vaishnava Upanishads are minor Upanishads of Hinduism, related to Vishnu theology (Vaishnavism). There are 14 Vaishnava Upanishads in the Muktika anthology of 108 Upanishads. They, along with other minor Upanishads, are generally classified separate from the thirteen major Principal Upanishads considered to be more ancient and from the Vedic tradition.

The Vaishnava Upanishads propound Vishnu, Narayana, Rama, or one of his avatars as the supreme metaphysical reality called Brahman in Hinduism. They discuss a diverse range of topics, from ethics, to the methods of worship.

Some of the Vaishnava Upanishads exist in more than one version, each version attached to a different Veda depending on the region their manuscript has been discovered. Furthermore, scholars disagree on which minor Upanishads are Vaishnava; for example, Deussen classifies Maha Upanishad as a Vaishnava Upanishad, but Tinoco lists it as a Samanya Upanishad.

The Vaishnava Upanishads also contrast from other groups of minor Upanishads, such as the Samanya Upanishads, which are of a generic nature, the Sannyasa Upanishads, which focus on the Hindu renunciation and monastic practice, the Yoga Upanishads related to Yoga, the Shaiva Upanishads, which highlight aspects of Shaivism, and the Shakta Upanishads, which highlight Shaktism.

== Date ==
The composition date of each Vaishnava Upanishad is unclear, and estimates on when they were composed vary with scholar. According to Mahony, the minor Upanishads are approximately dated to be from about 100 BCE to 1100 CE.

According to Ramdas Lamb, associate professor of religion at the University of Hawaii, the sectarian Upanishads which are the post-Vedic scriptures are not easily datable due to their very nature of the "multiple layers of material". Of these Upanishads the Purva Nrisimha Tapaniya and Uttara Tapaniya Upanishads, which are part of the Nrisimha Tapaniya Upanishadas, are the earliest dated to before the seventh century CE.

Patrick Olivelle states that sectarian Upanishads attached to Atharvaveda – which include some Vaishnava Upanishads – were likely composed in the second millennium, until about the 16th century.

== List ==
The fourteen Vaishnava Upanishads are:

List of the Vaishnava Upanishads according to Muktikā anthology
Title	Muktika serial #	Attached Veda	Period of creation
Narayana Upanishad	18	Krishna Yajurveda	1st Century AD
Nrisimha Tapaniya Upanishad	27	Atharvaveda	Unknown
Mahanarayana Upanishad	52	Atharvaveda	300-100 BCE
Rama Rahasya Upanishad	54	Atharvaveda	1st Century AD
Rama Tapaniya Upanishad	55	Atharvaveda	7th Century AD
Vasudeva Upanishad	56	Sama Veda	Unknown
Avyakta Upanishad	68	Sama Veda	7th Century AD
Tarasara Upanishad	91	Shukla Yajurveda	12th Century AD
Gopala Tapani Upanishad	95	Atharvaveda	8th Century BCE
Krishna Upanishad	96	Atharvaveda	Unknown
Hayagriva Upanishad	100	Atharvaveda	Unknown
Dattatreya Upanishad	101	Atharvaveda	Unknown
Garuda Upanishad	102	Atharvaveda	Unknown
Sri Upanishad	103	Krishna Yajurveda	1st Century AD

== See also ==
- Maithili Maha Upanishad
- Hindu texts
- Puranas

== Bibliography ==
- Deussen, Paul (1997). Sixty Upanishads of the Veda. Motilal Banarsidass. ISBN 978-81-208-1467-7.
- Lamb, Ramdas (2002). Rapt in the Name: The Ramnamis, Ramnam, and Untouchable Religion in Central India. SUNY Press. ISBN 978-0-7914-5386-5.
- Mahony, William K. (1998). The Artful Universe: An Introduction to the Vedic Religious Imagination. State University of New York Press. ISBN 978-0-7914-3579-3.
- Olivelle, Patrick (2008). Upanisads. Oxford University Press. ISBN 978-0-19-954025-9.
- Sen, S.C. (1937). The Mystical Philosophy Of The Upanishads. Cosmo Publications. ISBN 978-81-307-0660-3.
- Tinoco, Carlos Alberto (1996). Upanishads. IBRASA. ISBN 978-85-348-0040-2.
