= Avyakta Upanishad =

Vaishnava Hindu text

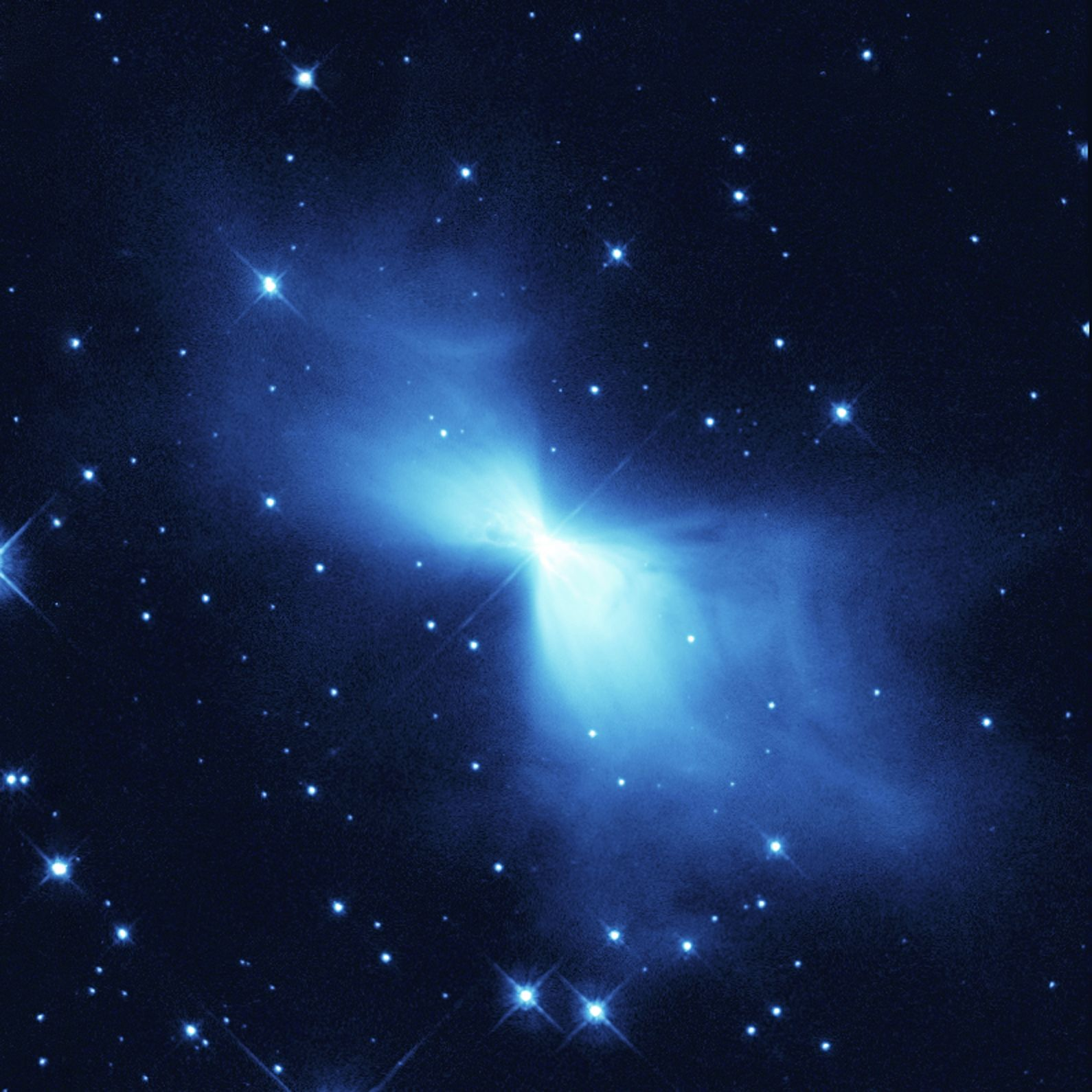
- There was nothing, then appeared light, then universe states Avyakta Upanishad
- Devanagari: अव्यक्तोपनिषत्
- IAST: Avyakta
- Title means: Non-manifest, universal Spirit
- Date: parts before 7th century CE
- Type: Vaishnavism
- Linked Veda: Sama Veda
- Chapters: 7
- Verses: 21
- Philosophy: Samkhya, Yoga, Vedanta

The Avyakta Upanishad (Sanskrit: अव्यक्त उपनिषत्, IAST: Avyakta Upaniṣad) is a Sanskrit text and a minor Upanishad of Hinduism. It is one of 16 Upanishads attached to the Samaveda, and classified under the 17 Vaishnava Upanishad.

This Upanishad exists in multiple versions; it discusses cosmology, how the universe evolved after creation, asserting the premise of Rigveda's Nasadiya Sukta that no one is knowledgeable about its origin or whether even the Supreme Being had any role in creating it. The Man-Lion avatar of Vishnu presents ideas on Brahman in many chapters, but its verses also mention and revere Shiva, Indra, Prajapati and other deities. The text asserts a syncretic synthesis of ideas from Samkhya, yoga and other Hindu philosophies.

The text is also known as Avyaktopanishad (Sanskrit:अव्यक्तोपनिषत्), and is listed at 68 in the Telugu language anthology of 108 Upanishads in Muktika canon.

== Nomenclature ==
Avyakta means that which is "the unevolved, not manifest, undeveloped, imperceptible, invisible, universal Spirit". Gerald Larson, Professor Emeritus, Department of Religious Studies, at the Indiana University, translates Avyakta as "primordial nature", conceptually synonymous with Prakriti of Samkhya school of Hindu philosophy.

== Chronology ==
The origin of the universe

Formerly there was nothing here,
neither the sky, nor the atmosphere, nor the earth.
There was only an appearance of light,
having no beginning and no end.
Neither small nor large, formless yet having a form.
Indistinguishable yet imbued with knowledge,
consisting of bliss.

— Avyakta Upanishad 1.1, Translator: PE Dumont

The date and author of the text's composition is unknown, but likely a medieval text expanded over time. The Avyakta Upanishad was mentioned by Gaudapada, states P.E. Dumont, Professor at the Johs Hopkins University, and therefore a version of the text likely existed before 7th-century CE.

The text exists in several versions, and the first manuscript of Avyakta Upanishad was published in 1895 by Tattva-Vivecaka Press (Poona edition), by Nirnaya Sagara Press in 1917 (Bombay edition), and A Mahadeva Sastri, Director at the Adyar Library, in 1923 (Madras edition).

The first translation of the text was published by Dumont, Professor, in 1940 in the Journal of the American Oriental Society, followed by another by TRS Ayyangar of the Adyar Library in 1945, in his collection of Vaishnavopanishads. The manuscript was translated again by P Lal of the University of Calcutta, in 1969, to mixed reviews. The Lal translation, states Arvind Sharma, is readable at the expense of accuracy, more a trans creation rather than translation.

In the anthology of 108 Upanishads of the Muktika canon, narrated by Rama to Hanuman, the Avyakta Upanishad is listed at number 68 but does not find mention in the Colebrooke's version of 52 Upanishads or under the collection of Upanishads under the title "Oupanekhat.

== Structure ==
The text has a prayer prologue followed by 7 chapters with cumulative total of 21 verses. Its structure is similar to Nrsimha-tapaniya (IAST: Nṛsiṃhatāpanī) Upanishad. Both are Vaishnava texts presenting the discourse about and through Vishnu in his man-lion avatar. The Avyakta Upanishad combines theism, Samkhya, Yoga and abstract ideas in the Upanishads in its verses. The wording in some verses use archaic Sanskrit, similar to one found in older Upanishads. The text references and includes fragments from the Rigveda and Principal Upanishads.

== Contents ==
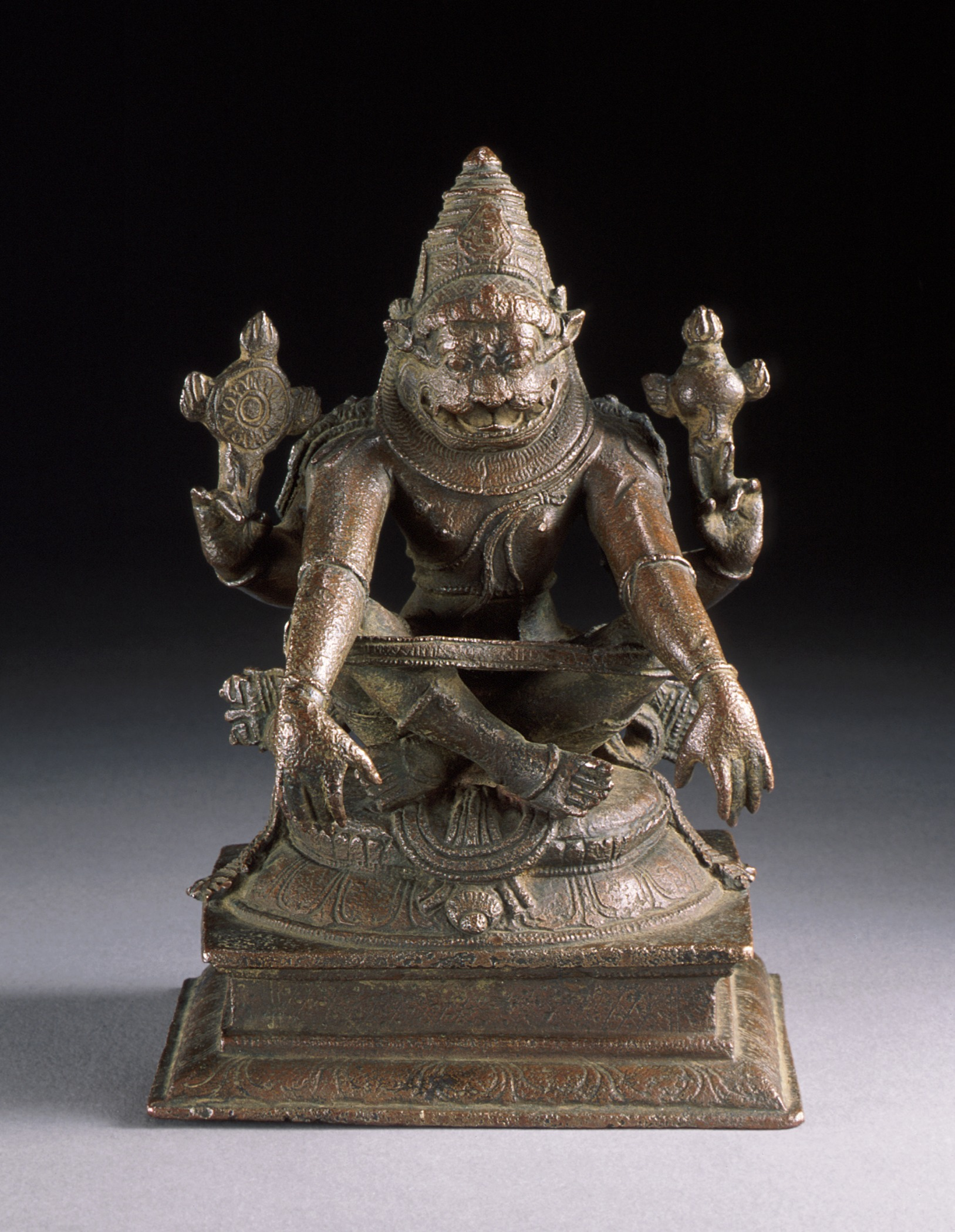
Narasimha, Man-Lion Avatar of Vishnu, opens the text and gives discourse on Brahman in various chapters.

=== Prayer prologue ===
The text opens with the poetic prayer,

May the Man-Lion Vishnu, who is knowledge of one's Self,
devouring the prince of the demons, who is ignorance of one's Self,
deliver me from my enemy and make me Brahmamatra,
Om! may my limbs, my powers grow strong, Peace! Hari ! Om !

— Avyakta Upanishad, Prologue

The prologue, states Dumont, is most probably an adaptation of a fragment from Kena Upanishad manuscripts that include an introductory prayer. The benediction for make me Brahmamatra refers to "make me entirely of Brahman".

=== Start of the universe ===
According to this Upanishad there are three stages of evolution of the universe, corresponding to three major hymns in the Rigveda. These are: Avyakta (non-manifest or invisible) stage found in the Nasadiya Sukta or the Hymn of Creation; Mahattatwa (determined indeterminate or manifest imprecisely) found in the Hiranyagarbha Sukta, and "Ahamkara (determinate)" or manifest state, explained in the Purusha Sukta dedicated to the Cosmic Being.

Chapter 1 opens by declaring that "formerly there was nothing here", consisting only of knowledge and bliss, and the universe started from this. That one being, states verse 1.2, then split into two, one yellow and one red. The yellow became the changing reality (matter, Maya), while the red became the unchanging reality (spirit, Purusha). The Purusha and Maya united, procreated, thus producing a golden egg, which with heat became Prajapati. When Prajapati became self-aware, he pondered, "what is my origin, what is my purpose and objective? Vac (sound) answered, "you are born of the Avyakta (unmanifested), your purpose is to create". Prajapati replied, "Who are you? Declare yourself!" The voice said, "To know me, do Tapas (deep meditation, austerity, asceticism)". So, Prajapati meditated as a Brahmachari for a thousand years, states verse 1.3 of the Upanishad.

Prajapati saw the Anustubh meter, begins chapter 2 of the text, he realized its power, a stanza in which all gods and Brahman are firmly established, one without which the Vedas are futile. Reciting the stanza and Om, Prajapati searched for the meaning of the red One (Purusha), then one day saw the light, the Spirit, Vishnu embraced by Sri, sitting on Garuda, with his head covered by the hood of Shesa, with eyes of Moon, Sun and Agni. Prajapati realized the absolute in and the powers of Vishnu, states the text in verse 2.3.

=== Prajapati's plea to Vishnu: how to create? ===
In chapter 3, Prajapati asks Vishnu, "Tell me the means to create the world". Vishnu answers as follows,

O Prajapati, know the supreme means to create.
Knowing it, thou wilt know everything,
do everything, accomplish everything.
One should meditate upon one's self,
as upon an oblation poured into the fire,
while reciting the Anustubh stanza.
That is the sacrifice by meditation.

— Avyakta Upanishad, 3.2

This is secret of the gods, asserts verse 3.3, the knowledge of this Upanishad. The one who knows this secret, fulfills whatever he seeks, wins all worlds, and never comes back to this world.

=== Creation of the universe ===
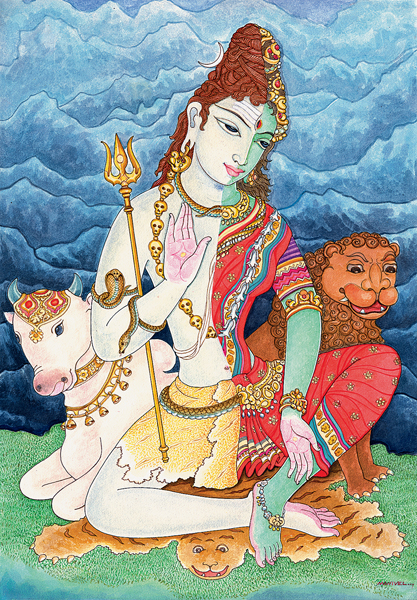
Prajapati created Shiva, in the image of half man and half woman, thus creating gender states chapter 6 of the text.

Prajapati did what Vishnu suggested, states chapter 4, meditated on his self, offering the sacrifice in his thought. The powers of creation came unto him, and he created the three worlds, states chapter 5. Thus came the earth, the atmosphere and the sky, from thirty of the thirty two syllables. With the remaining two syllables, he connected the three worlds. With the same thirty two syllables, he created thirty two gods, and then with syllables together he created Indra making him greater than the other gods, states chapter 5.

After syllables, Prajapati used words to create more. He used eleven words to create eleven Rudras, then eleven Adityas. With all eleven words together was born the twelfth Aditya, Vishnu. Combining four syllables, Prajapati created the eight Vasus, states the text. Then, Prajapati created the men, the learned Brahmanam with twelve syllables, ten and ten of others, and Shudram without the syllable. With two half stanzas of Anustubh, Prajapati created the day and night, then there was daylight, state verses 5.4 to 5.5.

From first Pada of the Anustubh stanza, he created the Rigveda, out of second the Yajurveda, from third the Samaveda, and the fourth yielded Atharvaveda. From the stanza came Gayatri, Tristubh, Jagati meters. Anustubh consists of all thirty two syllables, that is all the Vedic meters, states verse 5.5.

=== Creation of the male and female ===
Prajapati, after creating the gods and Vishnu, created Ardhanarishvara (a composite of Shiva-male and Parvati-female). This he then divided, states chapter 6 of the text, to produce women and men. In the world of gods, Prajapati has Indra's immortality which made him the first among gods. Indra, states the text, won the earth out of water using a tortoise as the foundation.

Chapter 7 of the text asserts the benefits of reciting and realizing the knowledge contained in the text, as equal to reciting all the Vedas, doing all sacrifices, bathing in all sacred bathing places, getting release from all great and secondary sins.

== Reception ==
Professor K.V. Gajendragadkar of Arts College, Nasik, states that the cosmology asserted by the text is "mythico-philosophical". At the start of this world there was only unlimited brightness or light.
