= Mahanarayana Upanishad =

Minor Upanishad of Hinduism

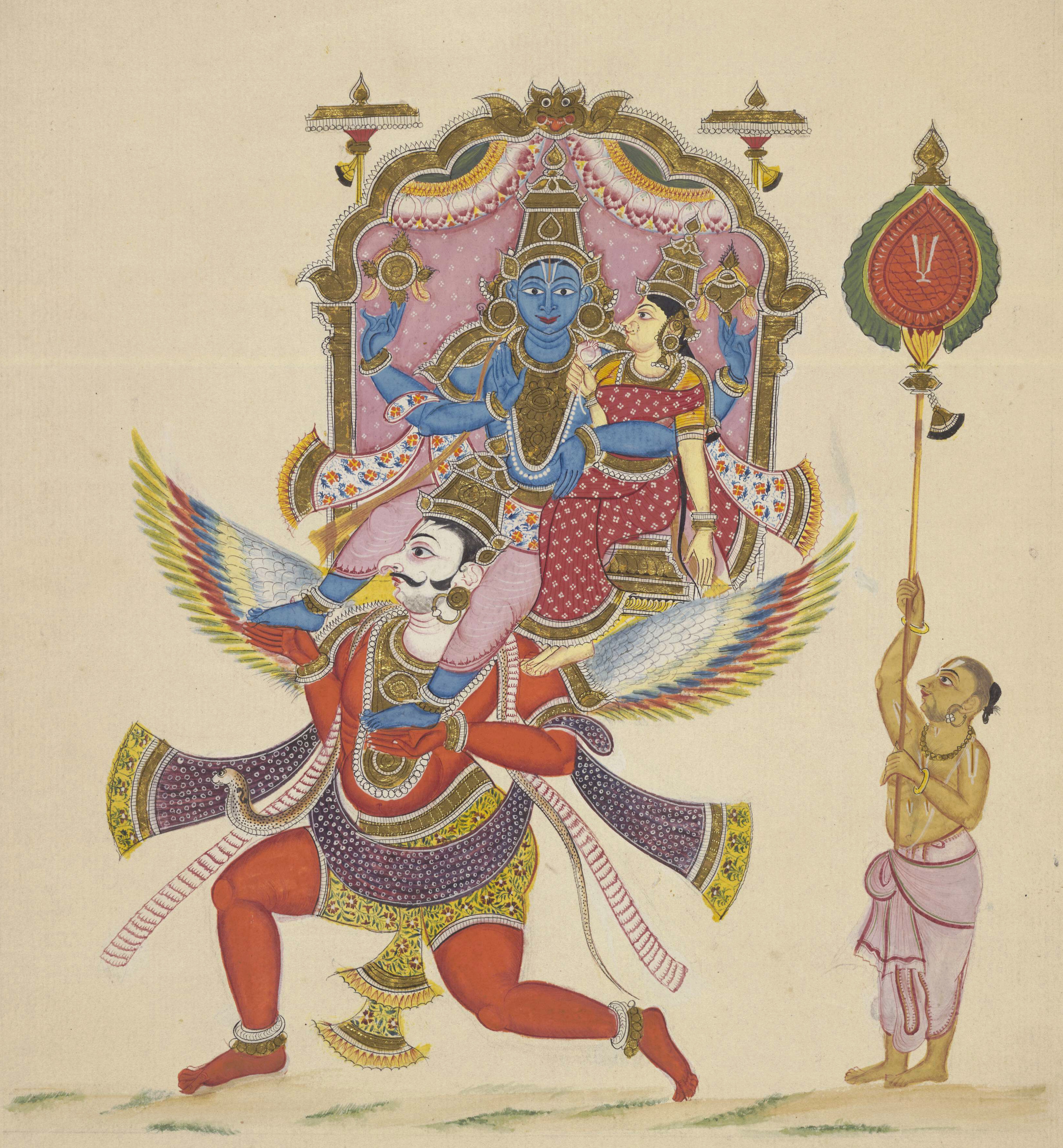
- Portrait of Narayana, with his consort, Lakshmi sitting on his mount Garuda.
- Devanagari: महानारायणोपनिषत्
- IAST: Mahānārāyaṇa
- Title means: Great Narayana
- Date: 1100 BCE
- Type: Vaishnava
- Linked Veda: Krishna Yajurveda or Atharvaveda
- Chapters: varies
- Verses: varies by manuscript
- Philosophy: Vaishnavism

The Mahanarayana Upanishad (Sanskrit: महानारायण उपनिषद्, IAST: Mahānārāyaṇa Upaniṣad), also Brihannarayana Upanishad, is an ancient Sanskrit text, and is one of the minor Upanishads of Hinduism. The text is classified as a Vaishnava Upanishad.

The text exists in three main versions. One version with 64 chapters is attached to the Krishna Yajurveda in several South Indian anthologies, and the same text in Andhra edition exists in an expanded form with 80 chapters attached to the same Veda. A second version is attached to the Atharvaveda, has 25 chapters and is prefixed with Tripadvibhuti. These manuscripts are sometimes titled as the Yajniki Upanishad or Tripad-vibhuti-mahanarayana Upanishad. According to Swami Vimalananda, this Upanishad is also called Yagniki Upanishad in reverence for sage Yagnatma Narayana.

Author Doris Srinivasan says, The Upanishad, despite its title which means "Great Narayana", is notable for glorifying both Narayana and Rudra, both as the first equivalent embodiment of Brahman, the concept of ultimate, impersonal, and transcendental reality in Hinduism. The Upanishad uses Vedanta terminology, and uses numerous fragments from Rigveda, Taittiriya Brahmana, Vajasaneyi Samhita and Principal Upanishads.

When doing sandhyavandanam, the mantras used for Prāṇāyāma, Mantrācamana, Gāyatrī āhvānam, Devatānamaskāraḥ and Gāyatrī Prasthānam are directly from Mahanarayana Upanishad (Andhra rescension containing 80 anuvakas).

== Development ==
The author and the century in which the Mahanarayana Upanishad was composed is unknown. The relative chronology of the text, based on its poetic verse and textual style, has been proposed by Parmeshwaranand to the same period of composition as Katha, Isha, Mundaka, and Shvetashvatara Upanishads, but before Maitri, Prashna, and Mandukya Upanishad. Feuerstein places the relative composition chronology of Mahanarayana to be about that of Mundaka and Prashna Upanishads. These relative chronology estimates date the text to second half of 1st millennium BCE.

Srinivasan suggests a later date, one after about 300 BCE, and by around the start of the common era, probably the 1st century CE, based on the texts it cites and the comparison of details of the Samdhya ritual found in Mahanarayana Upanishad with those found in other Sutras and Shastras. Deussen considers it to be ancient and a transitional link between the Upanishads of the three Vedas (Rig, Sama and Yajur) and the Atharvaveda.

Manuscripts of this text are also found titled as Mahanaryanopanishad. In the Telugu language anthology of 108 Upanishads of the Muktika canon, narrated by Rama to Hanuman, it is listed as Tripadvibhutimahanarayana Upanishad at number 52. It is different from the shorter version of Narayana Upanishad of the Atharva Veda. The tenth chapter of the Taittiriya Upanishad is adopted in this Mahanarayana text.

The Mahanarayana Upanishad was among the text included in the collection of fifty Upanishads translated into Persian by Sultan Mohammed Dara Shikhoh in 1656, under the title Maha-narain, and listed at 30 in the compilation called the Oupanekhat. In the Colebrooke's version of 52 Upanishads, popular in North India, it is listed at 39–40 as Brhadnarayana. In the Narayana anthology, popular in South India, it is included at number 34 as Mahanarayana or Brhadnarayana in Bibliothica Indica. Even though Adi Shankara did not directly comment on this Upanishad, his commentary on Brahmasutras such as at III.3.24 applies to this text, since some of the Vedanta sutras are incorporated in this Upanishad.

== Contents ==
All virtues are Tapas

Truth is Tapas,
Study is Tapas,
Quiet nature is Tapas,
Self-restraint is Tapas,
Charity is Tapas,
Sacrifice is Tapas,
when it said,
Bhur-bhuvah-svar-Brahman adore this,
it is also Tapas.

—Mahanarayana Upanishad Chapter 8

The text opens with cosmology, with a verse describing the Brahman principle as existent before the creation of universe, which existed as and in light in the "boundless cosmic water". The style of its opening verses suggest that the metaphysical principle of Brahman was well established by the time this text was composed. It is described as that where and from which the world originated and into which it shall disintegrate, upon whom all the gods are founded, it is that which was past and what will be, it is all parts of time, it is that which envelops the entire universe, which procreates and is present in all creatures, mobile and immobile, and that which is in Om. It is highest of the highest, greatest of the greatest, it is the law, it is the truth, it is the Brahman. The text calls this metaphysical principle as Agni (fire), Vayu (wind), Surya (sun), Chandrama (moon), Prajapati, Purusha, Rudra and Narayana, that they are all none other than Brahman. It is that, states verse 10.19 which was already there before the gods appeared.

The text extracts, repeats and integrates the hymns from the Vedic texts. For example, its first ten chapters reference and include hymn fragments or entire hymns from Rigveda 1.18, 1.22, 1.164, 2.3, 4.58, 5.82, 9.96 and 10.81, Yajurveda 32.1 through 32.4, Atharvaveda 10.8.13, section 6.9 of Katha Upanishad, 4.2 of Shvetashvatara Upanishad, 2.1 of Mundaka Upanishad and others. The chapter 2 of the text gives, for example, an elaborate version of the Rigvedic Gayatri mantra. This upanisad also contains some famous hymns such as Durga Sukta, Medha Sukta, and Narayana Sukta.

Axiology in the Upanishad

The charity or gift is the armour in the world,
All beings live on the gift of the other,
Through gifts strangers become friends,
Through gifts, they ward off difficulties,
On gifts and giving, everything rests,
That is why charity is the highest.

—Mahanarayana Upanishad 63.6

Narayana is particularly solemnized in the 11th chapter of the text, calling Atman (soul) as Narayana. This description mirrors those found in Yogashikha Upanishad and Yogatattva Upanishad. Narayana is described as the highest goal, the light beyond, the highest self, the highest Brahman, the highest object of thought.

The chapter 12 and twenty six verses that follow then solemnize Rudra, in a manner similar to Narayana, as being all the universe, the manifest One, the right, the just, the truth and the highest Brahman. Once again, the text references and integrates numerous hymns and their fragments from the Vedas, as it solemnizes Narayana and Rudra.

The Upanishad describes its axiology, describing the highest principles of human endeavor to be satyam (truth), tapas (penance), dama (temperance, self restraints), sama (quietude, stillness of the forest), danam (charity), dharmam (duty), prajanam (having children), agnihotram (sacred domestic fire), yajna (fire ritual), manasam (mind's contemplation), nyasa (renunciation, sannyasa). It then declares renunciation as the exquisite among these, possibly because this text is followed by the Sannyasa Upanishads in the Atharvaveda. The discussion of human virtues and value systems is carried in two parts of the Upanishad, once in chapter 8 and then again in chapters 62 and 63, but explained with different details.

The last chapter of the text, in different versions of the manuscript is a poem of reverence for those who renounce for their journey of knowledge, metrically describing how the life of this sannyasi (monk) is an act of worship in itself. He is a man of knowledge, asserts the Upanishad, whose faith is his wife, whose body is the sacred fuel, his chest is the sacrificial place, his tuft of hair is his sacrificial broom, his love is the sacred ghee (clarified butter), his speech is the Hotr priest, his breath is the Udgatr priest, his eyes are the Adhvaryu priest, his mind the object of his worship, his knowledge is his sacrifice. This chapter of the Mahanarayana Upanishad has been called by the French Indologist Jean Varenne as a Sannyasa Upanishad by itself.

The text is notable for using the word Nyasa with, states Patrick Olivelle, a meaning approximating Sannyasa (Yati, Bhikshu, Hindu Monk).

== See also ==
- Atharvashiras Upanishad
- Maha Upanishad
- Narayana Upanishad
- Nrisimha Tapaniya Upanishad
