= Narayana Upanishad =

Hindu Vaishnava scripture

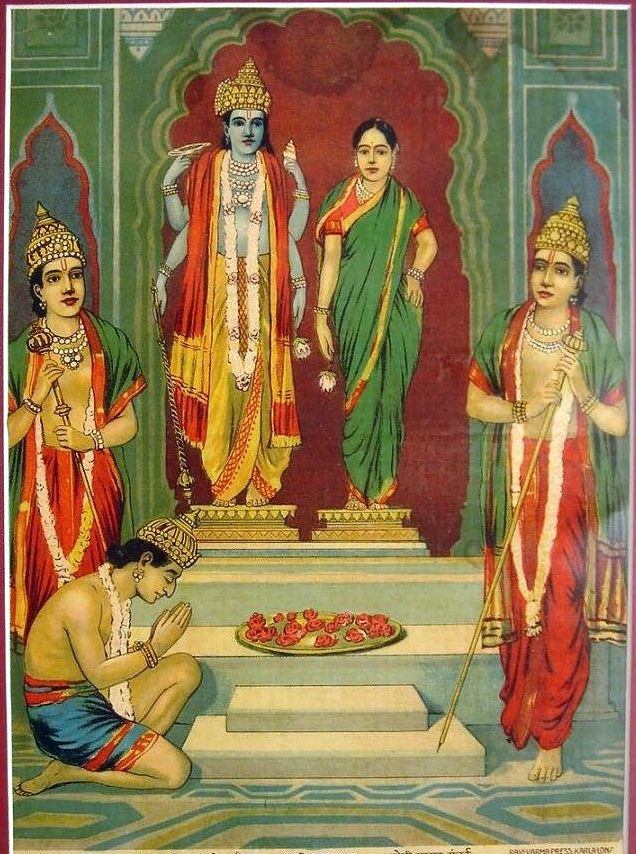
- Narayana with his consort Lakshmi
- Devanagari: नारायण उपनिषद्
- IAST: Nārāyaṇa Upaniṣad
- Title means: The Upanishad addressed to Narayana
- Type: Vaishnava
- Linked Veda: Krishna Yajurveda
- Chapters: 5

The Narayana Upanishad (Sanskrit: नारायण उपनिषद्) is one of the minor Upanishads, listed as number 18 in the extended anthology of 108 Upanishads recited by Rama to Hanuman in Hindu literature. It is listed as number 33 in the early 19th-century Henry Thomas Colebrooke anthology. It is written in the Sanskrit language, attached to the Krishna (Black) Yajurveda. It is one of the 14 Vaishnava Upanishads, and it recommends the bhakti of Narayana (Vishnu).

The Upanishad is, states Paul Deussen, among those that can be described as "cult of formula", where meditation shifts from objects and philosophy to that of a specific formula. The Narayana Upanishad posits, "Om Namo Narayanaya", an eight-syllabled mantra, as a means of reaching salvation, which is communion with Vishnu. The text is classified as one of the Mantra Upanishads.

The Narayana Upanishad asserts that "all gods, all rishis, and all beings are born from Narayana, and merge into Narayana". The text, suggests Deussen, is probably compiled from passages from different era and texts.

== Contents ==
The Upanishad is short, and has five chapters.

=== Chapter 1: Everything was born in Narayana, everything ends in Narayana ===
The Upanishad asserts in Chapter 1 that Narayana created the prana (life essence, breath), the senses, and the mind (Chit and the consciousness). He created the elements of the universe, namely the wind (Vayu), the light (Jyoti), the water (Apas), the fire (Agni), the ether (Akasha) and the Prithvi (earth). From him were born Brahman, Rudra, Prajapati, the twelve Adityas, Indra, the eleven Rudras, the eight Vasus, the meters of verses, all sages, and all beings. Everyone is born from Narayana, and ultimately merges back into Narayana.

=== Chapter 2: Narayana is the one God ===
Chapter 2 declares that Narayana is one without a second, eternal god, same as Brahma, Shiva, Indra, time, the corporal, the uncorporeal, the inner, the outer, this whole universe, what was, and what is to be.

=== Chapter 3, 4, and 5: Narayana Mantra ===
Chapters 3 and 4 state that studying the Narayana Upanishad is the path to fearless life, achieving immortality, becoming a part of Brahman. The mantra to study, states the text, is Om Namo Narayanaya, which is of 1-2-5 syllable construct, which when studied delivers one a long life and all material and non-material desires.

Chapter 5 states that the one who worships with the formula, "Om Namo Narayanaya", goes to Vishnu's heaven, Vaikuntha, becomes free from birth and samsara. A person who recites this Upanishad expiates sins and attains communion with Narayana. It adds,

Narayana merged with one with the inner bliss, the Brahman, the Purusha,
the holy syllable consisting of A, U, and M, it became the sound Aum.

Narayana Upanishad 5.1

— Translated by Paul Deussen

== Bibliography ==
- Farquhar, John Nicol (1920). An outline of the religious literature of India. H. Milford, Oxford university press. ISBN 81-208-2086-X.
- Kennedy, Vans (1831). Researches Into the Nature and Affinity of Ancient and Hindu Mythology. Longmans, Rees, Orme, Brown, and Green. p. 442.
- Tinoco, Carlos Alberto (1997). Upanishads. IBRASA. ISBN 978-85-348-0040-2.
