= Nrisimha Tapaniya Upanishad =

Hindu Vaishnava scripture

Nrisimha Tapaniya
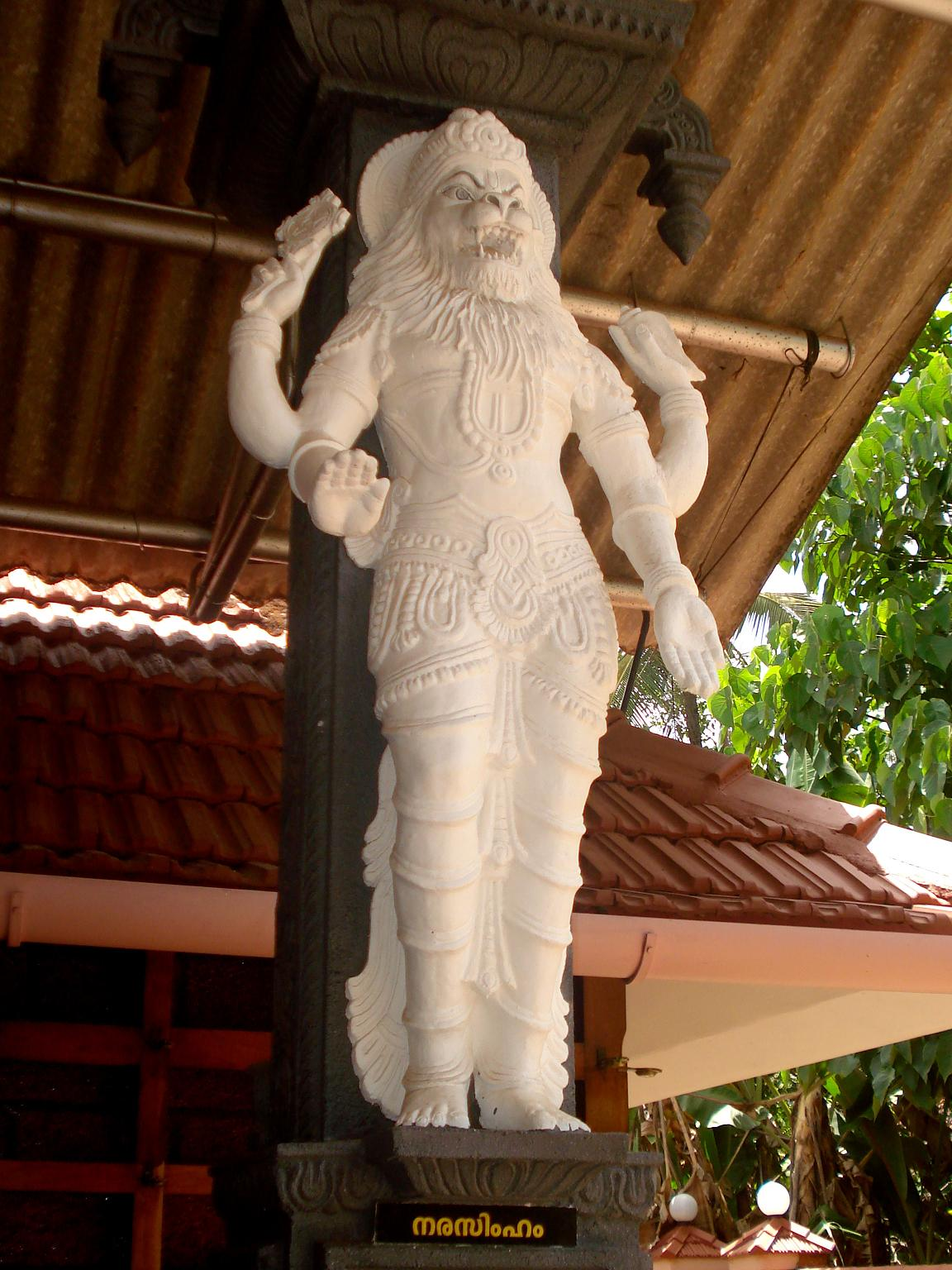
- Narasimha avatar
- Devanagari: नृसिंह तापनीय
- IAST: Nṛsiṁha-Tāpanīya
- Title means: Asceticism for the Man-Lion
- Date: before 7th-century CE
- Type: Vaishnava
- Linked Veda: Atharvaveda
- Chapters: Two Upanishads - Purva Tapaniya and Uttara Tapaniya
- Verses: Five divisions in the first, and nine chapters in the second Upanishad
- Philosophy: Vaishnava

The Nrisimha Tapaniya Upanishad (नृसिंह तापनीय उपनिषद्) is a Upanishadic text written in Sanskrit. It is one of the 31 Upanishads attached to the Atharvaveda, and classified as one of the Vaishnava Upanishads. It is presented in two parts, the Purva Tapaniya Upanishad and the Uttara Tapaniya Upanishad, which formed the main scriptures of the Narasimha sect of the Vaishnavas dated prior to the 7th century.

The text is notable for asserting at fourfold identity, that Atman (soul, self) is the same as Om, Brahman (Absolute Reality) and Vishnu Man-Lion avatar, Nrisimha. The Upanishad opens with verses of the Rigveda. Its foundation of monism philosophy, as well its style is also found in other Vaishnava Upanishads such as those dedicated to Rama.

The Nrisimha Mantra, with its four supplementary mantras, is enunciated with the epithet "mantraraja" (king of hymns). It has "Om" as the foremost hymn which is repeatedly emphasized throughout this Upanishad. The text discusses Nrisimha Mantra and related hymns.

The text is also referred to as Narasimha-tapani Upanishad and Nrisimhatapanopanishad (Sanskrit: नृसिंहोत्तरतापनीयोपनिषत्).

== Date ==
The century in which Nrsimha-tapani Upanishad text was composed is unclear. Farquhar dates it to be complete before the 7th century CE, because Gaudapada mentioned it. It is also commented upon by Adi Shankaracharya and his commentary on it is mentioned in the Shankara Digvijaya of Vidyaranya. Sayana, the famous commentator of the Vedas quotes it to explain the 5th mantra of the Purusha Sukta in his commentary on the Rig Veda.

Lamb dates the text to "well before the 7th-century".

== Contents ==
The Upanishad's invocation and concluding hymns are prayers to the devas, Indra, Surya, and Garuda as destroyers of evil, seeking blessings of eyes to see, and offer obeisance to enjoy a life span that the divine being ordains. Brihaspati, the deity of prayer or devotion, is also invoked to bestow health, prosperity, and peace.

The Upanishad is presented in two parts, Poorva Tapaniya Upanishad, which has five sub divisions that are also called Upanishads, and the Uttara Tapaniya Upanishad, which consists of nine sections.

=== Nrsimha Purva Tapaniya Upanishad ===
ॐ, Atman, Brahman

Om! This syllable is the whole world.
Its explanation is as follows:
The past, the present and the future,
all this is the sound Om.
And besides, what still lies beyond the three times,
that also is the sound Om.
All this, verily, is Brahman,
but Brahman is this Atman.

—Nrisimha Purva Tapaniya Upanishad 4.1
—Nrisimha Uttara Tapaniya Upanishad 1.1

In the first part of this Upanishad, Nrisimha, also spelled Narasimha, is described as an avatar or incarnation of Lord Vishnu born in the anthropomorphic form of half human and half lion and seen in two colours of black and golden red. He takes this form to put an end to the evil deeds of the demon who had a boon that he cannot be killed by a human nor by an animal. The demon was also the father of Prahlada, who was persecuting his own son for being a Vishnu devotee.

In the second part, a long chapter, the significance of the Nrisimha Mantra as an important hymn to recite to overcome death and enjoy family life is emphasized. The key words used in the Nrisimha Mantra to worship Nrisimha are: "Ugra (fierce), Veera (heroic), Maha Vishnu, Jwalantham (burning), Nrisimha (half man and half lion), Trivikrama (one who measures the world in three steps), Bheeshanam (fear full), Bhadram (safe), and Mruthyu-Mruthyum (death and deathlessness).”

In the third long section of the Purva Tapaniya, the Devas appeal to Brahma to teach them the meaning and benefits of Nrisimha Mantra, known as the king of all chants, which is set in anushtap meter (eight lettered rhythmic structure), which Brahma agrees to explain. Brahma explains that illusion or maya is personified by Nrisimha which in turn is identified as Om.

In the fourth division, another long chapter, Brahma explains that the benefits of the Nrisimha Mantra, all of which is extracted from the Vedas, as a combination of: Pranava that is Om or AUM; Savitri an eight lettered hymn, which gives prosperity and wealth; Yajur Lakshmi, a twenty four lettered hymn which will usher fame and prosperity; and Nrisimha Gayathri hymn in which Vedas and Devas are imbibed.

In the fifth division of this Upanishad, Brahma explains the importance of the Sudarshana Chakra, also known as Maha Chakra, which would fulfill one's wishes and opens the way to moksha or liberation. Reciting this mantra daily without any aspirations would help overcome "fire, wind, sun, moon, devas, plants and poison". At the center of this Sudarshana Chakra, Om as the Taraka mantra of Nrisimha are inscribed. These are: Sudarshana (on six petals), Narayana (on eight petals), Vasudeva (on 12 petals), and mathruka (on 16 petals). The old Vedic gods are placed in the realm of Maya, that is outside the circle.

=== Nrsimha Uttara Tapaniya Upanishad ===
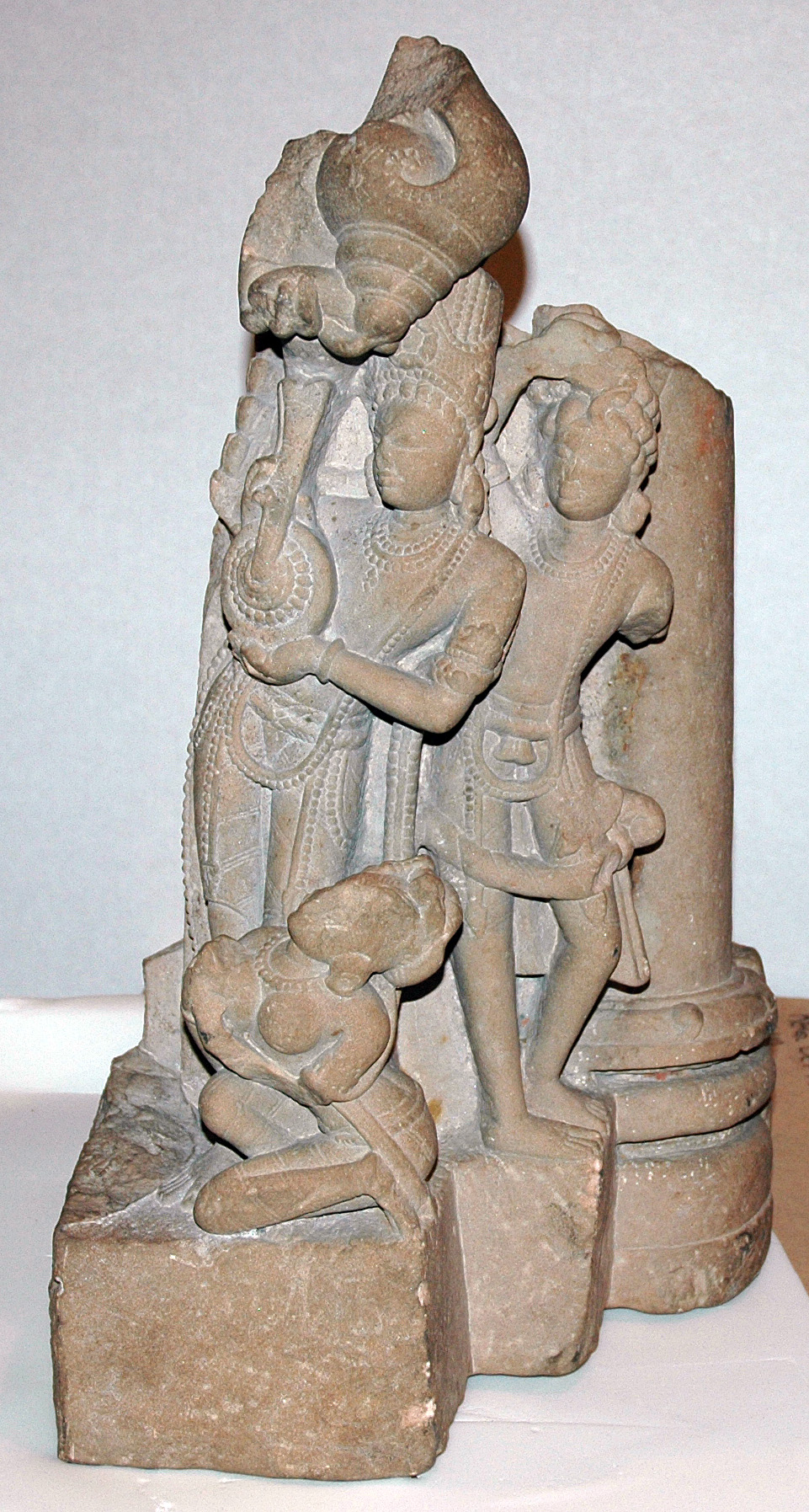
The Nrisimha Tapaniya Upanishad describes Sudarshana chakra mandala, which developed into protective amulets, a weapon (11th century, above), but also a means to meditate on Atman.

The Uttara Tapaniya Upanishad which has nine sections, and starts with a request made to Brahma by the devas to enlighten them on the aspects of AUM and the soul or Atman. He explains that soul is an aspect of God which is more than all knowledge.

In the second section Brahman's four divisions, which match with the four letters of OM, are explained. The letters of AUM and reciting the Nrisimha Mantra would also enable understanding of the Turiya or fourth state of pure consciousness.

In the third section explanation is provided on intense meditation of Om and subsuming everything in pure consciousness.

In the fourth section, the meditation upon the soul as Omkara and Parabramha with pure consciousness of Pranava sound is elaborated.

The fifth section explains that one who meditates using the Om symbol exists as Brahman and attains Brahman. It is also stated that worship of the soul is the same as reciting the letter AUM, which will result in realization of Brahman in the form of Nrisimha. Such a meditation will also make a person realize Parabramha as Parabramha Nrisimha.

In the sixth section importance of the worship of Nrisimha by devas to over come the evil qualities within them is emphasized. Its four effects on them are explained. The seventh section deals with aspects of meditation. The eighth section pertains to the soul or Nrisimha. The soul is stated to be fully entwined with state of Turiya or pure consciousness.

In the ninth section Prajapati explains the meaning of "AUM", that is the soul and its presence as a mere witness. The lion form is stated to be an illusion, a form beyond thought, which is seen in different forms due to ignorance. The sensory organs are not able to perceive it and hence it is not known even when it is apparently known. Prajapati tells the devas to perceive "Atma" as "I am it and it is me". The devas obeyed the commands of Prajapati and as a result all their illusions vanished.

== Bibliography ==
- Deussen, Paul (1997). Sixty Upanishads of the Veda. Motilal Banarsidass. ISBN 978-81-208-1467-7.
- Farquhar, John Nicol (1920). An Outline of the Religious Literature of India. Oxford University Press. ISBN 978-0-89581-765-5.
- Lamb, Ramdas (29 August 2002). Rapt in the Name: The Ramnamis, Ramnam, and Untouchable Religion in Central India. SUNY Press. ISBN 978-0-7914-5386-5.
- Prasoon, Prof.S.K. (1 January 2008). Indian Scriptures. Pustak Mahal. ISBN 978-81-223-1007-8.
- Nair, Shantha N. (1 January 2008). Echoes of Ancient Indian Wisdom. Pustak Mahal. ISBN 978-81-223-1020-7.
- Tinoco, Carlos Alberto (1997). Upanishads. IBRASA. ISBN 978-85-348-0040-2.
