= Prashna Upanishad =

One of the ancient Sanskrit scriptures of Hinduism

Prashna
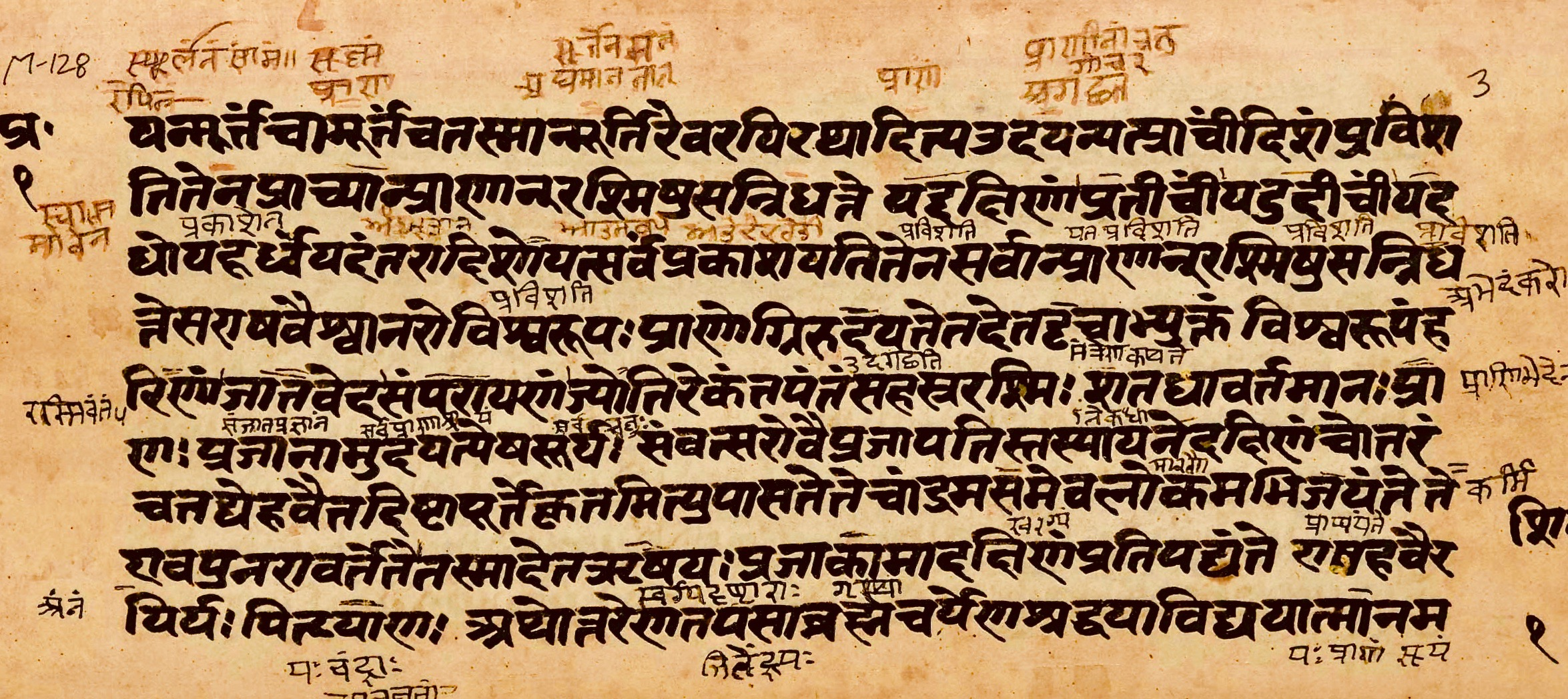
- A sample text of the Prashna Upanishad (Sanskrit, Devanagari script)
- Devanagari: प्रश्न
- IAST: Praśna
- Date: 1st millennium BCE
- Type: Mukhya Upanishad
- Linked Veda: Atharvaveda
- Commented by: Adi Shankara, Madhvacharya, Rangaramanuja

The Prashna Upanishad (Sanskrit: प्रश्नोपनिषद्, IAST: Praśnopaniṣad) is an ancient Sanskrit text, embedded inside the Atharva Veda, ascribed to the Pippalada sakha of Vedic scholars. It is a Mukhya (primary) Upanishad, and is listed as number 4 in the Muktika canon of 108 Upanishads of Hinduism.

The Prashna Upanishad contains six Prashna (questions), with each chapter discussing the answers. The chapters end with the phrase prasnaprativakanam, which literally means "thus ends the answer to the question". In some manuscripts discovered in India, the Upanishad is divided into three Adhyayas (chapters) with a total of six Kandikas (कण्डिका, short sections).

The first three questions are profound metaphysical questions but, states Eduard Roer, do not contain any defined, philosophical answers, and are mostly embellished mythology and symbolism. The first question gives a detailed philosophical and logical idea about the origin of life on earth, and the description is one of the earliest conceptualisations of matter and energy. The fourth section, in contrast, contains substantial philosophy. The last two sections discuss the symbol Om and concept of Moksha. Roer as well as Weber suggest that the last two Prashnas may be spurious, later age insertion into the original Upanishad.

The Prashna Upanishad is notable for its structure and sociological insights into the education process in ancient India. In some historic Indian literature and commentaries, it is also called the Shat Prasna Upanishad.

== Etymology ==
Prashna (प्रश्न) literally means, in modern usage, "question, query, inquiry". In ancient and medieval era Indian texts, the word had two additional context-dependent meanings: "task, lesson" and "short section or paragraph", with former common in Vedic recitations. In Prashna Upanishad, all these contextual roots are relevant. The text consists of questions with lessons or answers, and the sections within the Upanishad are also called prashna.

== Chronology ==
The Prashna Upanishad was probably composed in the second half of 1st millennium BCE, likely after other Atharva Veda texts such as the Mundaka Upanishad, but the precise chronology of Prasna Upanishad is unclear and contested. The Mundaka Upanishad, for example, writes Patrick Olivelle, is rather later era ancient Upanishad and is, in all probability, post-Buddhist. The chronology of Prasna Upanishad, and other ancient India texts, is difficult to resolve because all opinions rest on scanty evidence, an analysis of archaism, style and repetitions across texts, driven by assumptions about likely evolution of ideas, and on presumptions about which philosophy might have influenced which other Indian philosophies.

Olivelle states Prashna Upanishad "cannot be much older than the beginning of the common era". Mahony suggests an earlier date, placing Prashna along with Maitri and Mandukya Upanishads, as texts that probably emerged about early fourth century BCE. Phillips dates Prashna Upanishad as having been composed after Brihadaranyaka, Chandogya, Isha, Taittiriya and Aitareya, Kena Katha and Mundaka, but before Mandukya, Svetasvatara and Maitri Upanishads. Ranade posits a view similar to Phillips, with a slightly different ordering, placing the Prashna Upanishad's chronological composition in the fifth group of ancient Upanishads, but after the Svetasvatara Upanishad.

== Structure ==
The Prashna Upanishad consists of six questions and their answers. Except the first and the last Prashna, all other sections ask multiple questions. The pupils credited with the six questions are respectively Kabandhin Katyayana, Bhargava Vaidarbhi, Kausalya Asvalayana, Sauryayanin Gargya, Saibya Satyakama and Sukesan Bharadvaja. Sage Pippalada is credited with giving the answers.

The questions are not randomly arranged, but have an embedded structure. They begin with macrocosmic questions and then proceed to increasing details of microcosmic, thus covering both universals and particulars. The six questions are about the origin, prana, origin of mind, meditation and spiritual states, nature of the syllable "Om", and the nature of the Supreme Being.

== Contents ==
=== Ethics before education in ancient schools ===
The opening verses of Prashna Upanishad describe students who arrive at a school seeking knowledge about highest Brahman (Ultimate Reality). They ask sage Pippalada to explain this knowledge. He does not start providing answers for their education, but demands that they live with him ethically first, as follows:

तन् ह स ऋषिरुवच भूय
एव तपसा ब्रह्मचर्येण श्रद्धया संवत्सरं संवत्स्यथ
यथाकामं प्रश्नान् पृच्छत
यदि विज्ञास्यामः सर्वं ह वो वक्ष्याम इति ||

— Prashna Upanishad, 1.2
Translation:

To them then the Rishi (sage) said:
Dwell with me a year, with Tapas, with Brahmacharya, with Sraddha (faith),
Then ask what questions you will,
If we know, we will tell you all.

This preface is significant, states Johnston, as it reflects the Vedic era belief that a student's nature and mind must first show a commitment, aspiration, and moral purity before knowledge is shared. Secondly, the method of first question by the student and then answer is significant, according to Johnston, as it reflects an interactive style where the student has worked out the question for himself before he is provided an answer, in contrast to a lecture style where the teacher provides the questions and answers regardless of whether the student understands either. The three ethical precepts emphasized in this verse of Prashna Upanishad are Tapas (austerity, perseverance, fervour), Brahmacharya (chastity, self-discipline) and Sraddha (faith, purity, calmness of mind).

The second interesting part of the answer is the implicit admission by the teacher with "if we know", that he may not know the answer, and thus acknowledging a sense of skepticism and humility into the process of learning.

=== How did life begin? - First Prashna ===
A year later, sage Pippalada is asked the first question, "whence are living beings created?" In verse 1.4 of Prashna Upanishad, the sage's answer is stated: Prajapati performed Tapas (heat, meditative penance, austerity) and created two principles, Rayi (matter, feminine), and Prana (spirit, masculine), thinking that "these together will couple to produce for me creatures in many ways". The sun is the spirit, matter is the moon. The sun ascends to the highest, alone in splendor, warming us and serving as the spirit of all creatures. He is Aditya, illuminates everything, as stated in the first Prashna, and has two paths - the northern and the southern. Those who desire offspring follow the guidance of sun's southern path, while those who seek the Self take the northern path, one of knowledge, brahmacharya, tapas and sraddha.

The first chapter includes several symbolic mythological assertions. For example, it states that the sun is ultimately the giver of rain and races in sky in the "chariot with seven wheels and six spokes". This symbolism is also found in more ancient Vedic literature, and the seven wheels represents half years, seasons, months, half months, days, nights, and muhurtas (मुहूर्त, a Vedic era division of time equaling 48 minutes and one muhurta was asserted to be 1/30 of a day). The six spoke symbolism refers to the Vedic practice of describing sun as having six seasons, in contrast to five seasons for earth. (Note: Here the Hemanta (Sanskrit: हेमन्त) and Shishira (Sanskrit: शिशिर, romanized: Śiśira) are considered as a combined season for winters.)

The first section ends with verses 1.15 and 1.16 asserting that ethical living is necessary to realize the Atman-Brahman: Satya (truthfulness), Brahmacharya (chastity, celibacy if unmarried, fidelity if married), Tapas (austerity, meditation, perseverance), no Anrta (अनृत, falsehood, lying, deception, cheating) no Jihma (जिह्म, moral crookedness, ethical obliqueness with an intent to not do the right thing), and no Maya (माया, dissimulation, delusion, guile).

=== What is a living being? - Second Prashna ===
The second Prashna starts with three questions, "how many Deva (gods, deities, powers) uphold a living being? how many manifest their power thus? and who is the best?".

The question is significant because it explicitly expresses gods to be residing in each living being and in nature, to support life. This is widely interpreted by scholars, given the context of answer that follows, to reflect the extant belief that deities express themselves in human beings and creatures through sensory organs and capabilities. The second significant aspect of the question is its structural construct, wherein the teacher is called Bhagavan, reflecting the Vedic culture of veneration and respect for teachers. The Upanishad thus suggests multiple contextual meanings of the word Bhagavan. Such use of the term Bhagavan for teacher is repeated elsewhere, such as in the opening lines and verse 4.1 of the Prashna Upanishad, as well as in other Upanishads such as in verse 1.1.3 of the Mundaka Upanishad.

Sage Pippalada opens the answers to the three questions by listing five gross elements, five senses and five organs of action as expression of deities. In verses 2.3 and 2.4, the Prashna Upanishad states that Prana (breath, spirit) is the most essential and powerful of all, because without it all other deities cannot survive in a creature, they exist only when Prana is present. The deities manifest their power because of and in honor of Prana. The spirit manifests itself in nature as well as life, as Agni (fire), as sun, as air, as space, as wind, as that which has form and as that which does not have form.

=== What is the nature of man, and how is it so? - Third Prashna ===
The third Prashna of the Upanishad asks six questions: (1) Whence is life born? (2) when born, how does it come into the body? (3) when it has entered the body, how does it abide? (4) how does it go out of the body? (5) how does life interface its relation with nature and senses? (6) how does life interface with Self?

Sage Pippalada states that these questions are difficult, and given the student's past curiosities about Brahman, he explains it as follows,

आत्मन एष प्राणो जायते

From the Atman (Self) is born this life.

— Prashna Upanishad 3.3,

Life enters the body, states the Prashna Upanishad, by the act of mind. It governs the body by delegating work to other organs, sage Pippalada continues in verse 3.4, each specialized to do its own work independent of the other powers, just like a king commands his ministers to govern functions in the villages in his kingdom. The Upanishad then enumerates a theory of human body that is found in older Vedic literature, such as the Brihadaranyaka Upanishad hymn II.1.19. It asserts, for example, that human body has a heart as the principal organ of Self, from where arise 101 major arteries, each major artery divides into a hundred times, which in turn subdivide into 72,000 smaller arteries, giving a total of 727,210,201 small and large arteries, and that these arteries diffuse air throughout the body. It is this life-breath which interfaces Self to all organs and life in human body, states the Upanishad.

The third Prashna uses symbolic phrases, relying on more ancient texts. It states, in verse 3.5 for example, that "seven lights" depend on air circulated by arteries in order to function, which is a phrase which means "two eyes, two ears, two nostrils and mouth". Its answers to metaphysical questions are physiological, rather than philosophical.

=== What establishes man? - Fourth Prashna ===
The first three Prashnas of the Upanishad focus on cause and effect of the transient, empirical, manifested world, remarks Eduard Roer. The fourth through sixth Prasna of the Upanishad focus on the nature of Self, that which is unchanging and independent of cause, of proof, and is self-evident.

The fourth Prashna lists five questions: (1) What sleeps in man? (2) What is awake therein (when he sleeps)? (3) Which Deva (god, deity, organ) in man is it that sees the dreams? (4) What is it in man that experiences happiness? (5) On what is all this founded?

The Prashna Upanishad begins the answer with a simile to state the background of extant theory, before offering its own explanation. Like rays of the sun that withdraw into the disc as it sets and that disperse ever more as it rises, all gods (sensory organs) inside man withdraw and become one in the highest Deva named Manas (mind) when he sleeps. Other people say, asserts the Upanishad, gods that reside inside man, other than the deity of mind, cease from work in this state of sleep, and in this state, the essence of a person, his Self sleeps. The Fourth Prashna of the Upanishad, thereafter presents "five fire" theory, pointing out that Prana (breath, life-force) does not sleep, that the mind sacrifices food stored in the body with air provided by breath in order to serve the mind. Dream is a form of enjoyment for the mind, where it reconfigures and experiences again, in new ways, what it has seen before, either recently or in past, either this life or another birth, whether true or untrue (Shaccha-Ashaccha, सच्चासच्च), whether heard or unheard, whether pleasant or unpleasant. In dream, mind beholds all.

There is a deep sleep state where impressions end and the mind too sleeps without impressions, and this is the complete state of mind relaxation, of body happiness. It is then when everything in a person retires into Atman-Brahman, including the matter and elements of matter, water and elements of water, light and elements of light, eye and what is visible, ear and what is audible, smell and the objects of smell, taste and objects of taste, touch and objects of touch, speech and objects of speech, sexuality and objects of its enjoyment, feet and what is moveable, hands and what is seizable, mind and the objects of mind, thought and objects of thought, reason and objects of reason, self-consciousness and objects of self-consciousness, insight and objects of illumination, life-force and object of life-force.

After setting the foundation of its dream theory and deep-sleep theory, the Prashna Upanishad defines Atman as Purusha (Cosmic Self, Consciousness, Soil of all beings, Universal principle),

एष हि द्रष्ट स्प्रष्टा श्रोता घ्राता रसयिता मन्ता बोद्धा कर्ता विज्ञानात्मा पुरुषः । स परेऽक्षर आत्मनि संप्रतिष्ठते ॥ ९ ॥

It is he who beholds, touches, hears, smells, tastes, perceives, thinks, reasons, conceives, acts, whose essence is knowledge, the Self. His foundation and dwelling is the supreme, indestructible Self.

— Prashna Upanishad, 4.9

The Prashna Upanishad answers that happiness and bliss in man is this established calm state of knowing and dwelling in the Atman, the spiritual state of truth, beauty and goodness.

=== What is meditation, and why meditate? - Fifth Prashna ===
The Prashna Upanishad opens the fifth section with the question: if a human being sincerely meditated on the symbol "Om" (Aum) until his death, what would he obtain by it? The section then asserts that one meditates to know "Self" (Atman-Brahman), then metaphorically presents the different levels of meditation, the levels of knowledge gained, and the consequent effect on the person of such meditation in this and after life.

The Upanishad asserts that there are three levels of Atma (Self) knowledge, the lowest level being partial from meditating on the first letter of Aum, that is A. This leads to a quick rebirth, but with ethical strengths and consequently greatness. The intermediate level of self-knowledge is akin to meditating on two letters of Aum, that is A and U. The intermediate level of self-knowledge leads the man to gain ethical behavior and the world of Manas (moon, mind), he first enjoys the heavenly life and thereafter is reborn to the world of man. The person who meditates on all aspects of self, that is all three syllables A, U, and M, reaches full self-knowledge, is liberated from all suffering, sin and fears, reaches the world of Brahman. Such a man "beholds the Self as universal, pervading in all creatures, and eternal".

The Prashna Upanishad symbolically likens the three states of knowledge to sets of three: being awake, dream-sleep, and deep-sleep; three pronunciations - tara, mandra, and madhyama. (true but high tone, unclear but pleasant-base tone, perfect middle-tone that is pleasant and true, respectively).

=== What is immortal in man? - Sixth Prashna ===
The sixth Prashna in the Upanishad opens with a story of a prince visiting one of the student and asking, "where is the person with sixteen parts?" The student confesses he does not know, with the ethical precept, "answering with untruth, when one does not know the answer, is wrong". The student asks sage Pippalada the same question. The sage answers, states the Upanishad, that he and every human being has sixteen parts.

This answer is significant because more ancient texts of the Vedic era, such as the Samhitas, refer to Prajapati, the Lord of Creation, as Ṣoḍaśin (Sanskrit: षोडशिन्) - which literally means, the one with sixteen parts. Man, implies the sixth Prashna of the Upanishad, is created in Prajapati's image and innately lord of creation. The section states, Self is immortal. Self-knowledge, the knowledge of Brahman, is the highest knowledge, state the closing verses of the Prashna Upanishad.

== Reception ==
Several Indian scholars reviewed and published their commentaries (bhasya) on Prashna Upanishad, including Adi Shankara and Madhvacharya. Both of them link the teachings in Prashna Upanishad to those in Mundaka Upanishad, another Upanishad that is embedded inside the Atharva Veda.

The theosophist Johnston has compared quotes from Prashna Upanishad with those in Gospel of Matthew, in his examples of how there are parallels and similarities in Hindu and Christian theology.

I.B. Horner quotes from Prashna Upanishad examples of how the teachings in Hindu Upanishads and early Buddhist Dhamma texts are similar.

Halder includes Prasna Upanishad among the numerous ancient texts of India that is loaded with symbolism.

Mlecko highlights Prashna Upanishad, among other Vedic literature, in his review of education system and the revered role of teachers (Guru) in Vedic era of Hinduism.
