= Upanishads =

Ancient Sanskrit religious and philosophical texts of Hinduism

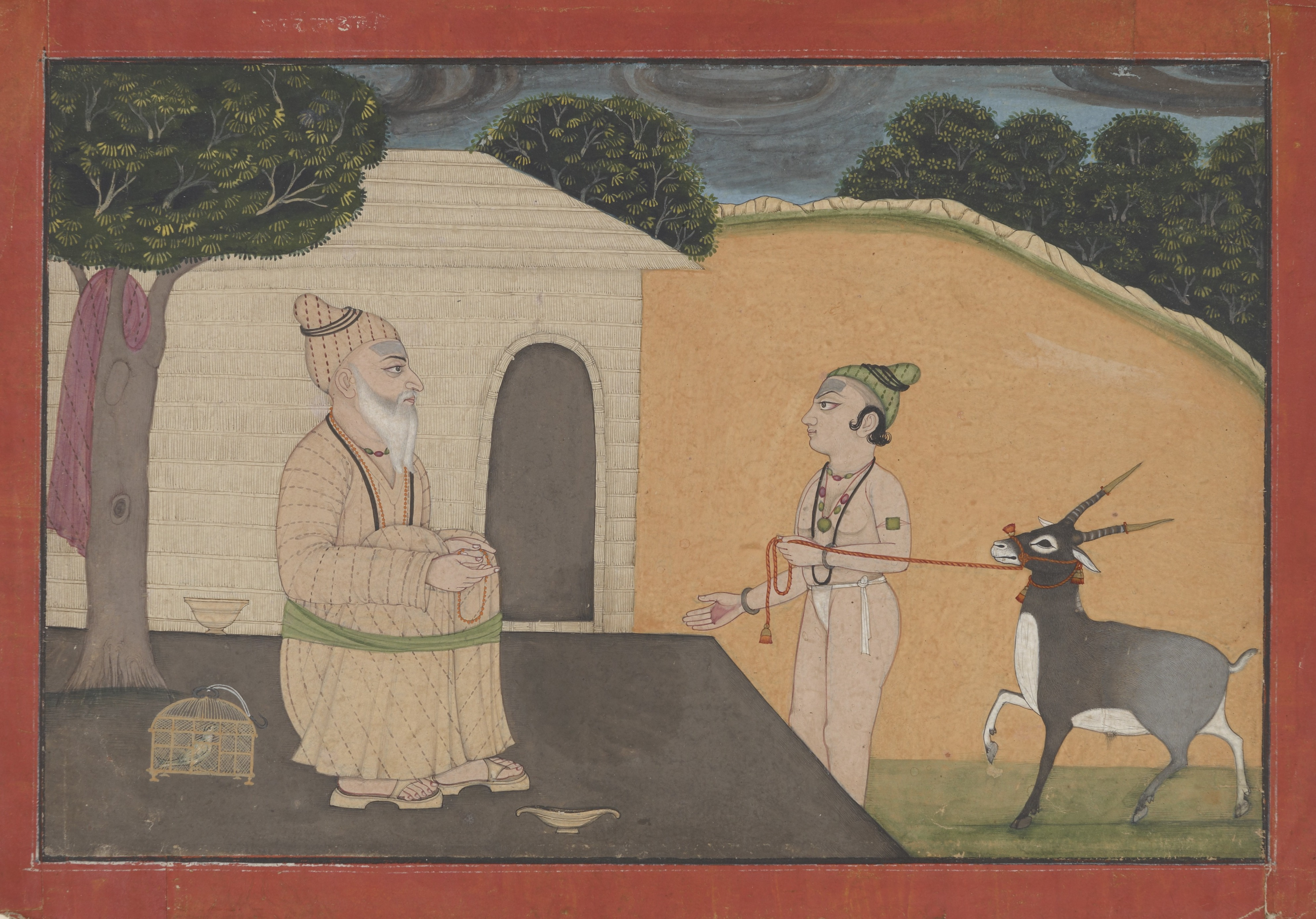
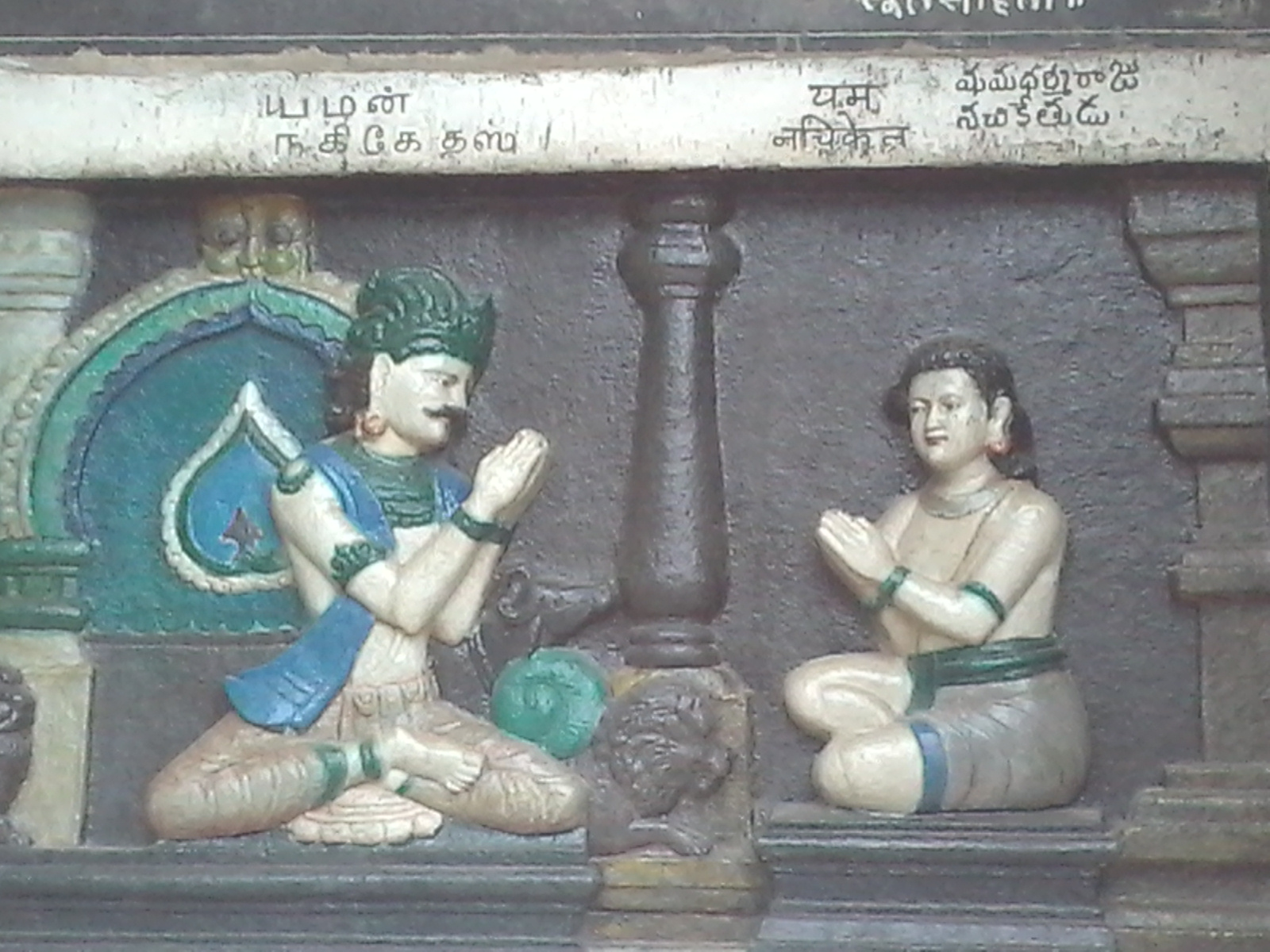
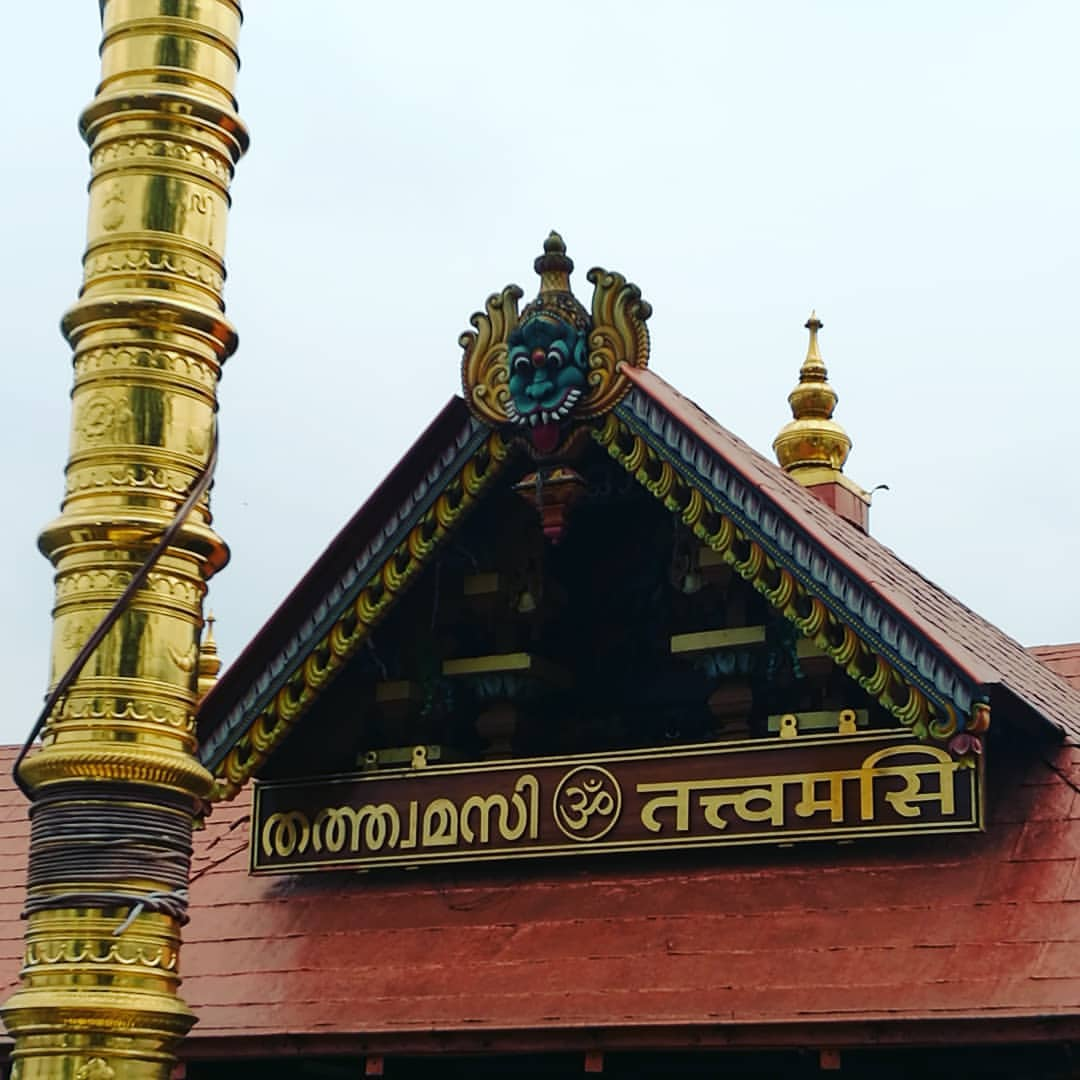
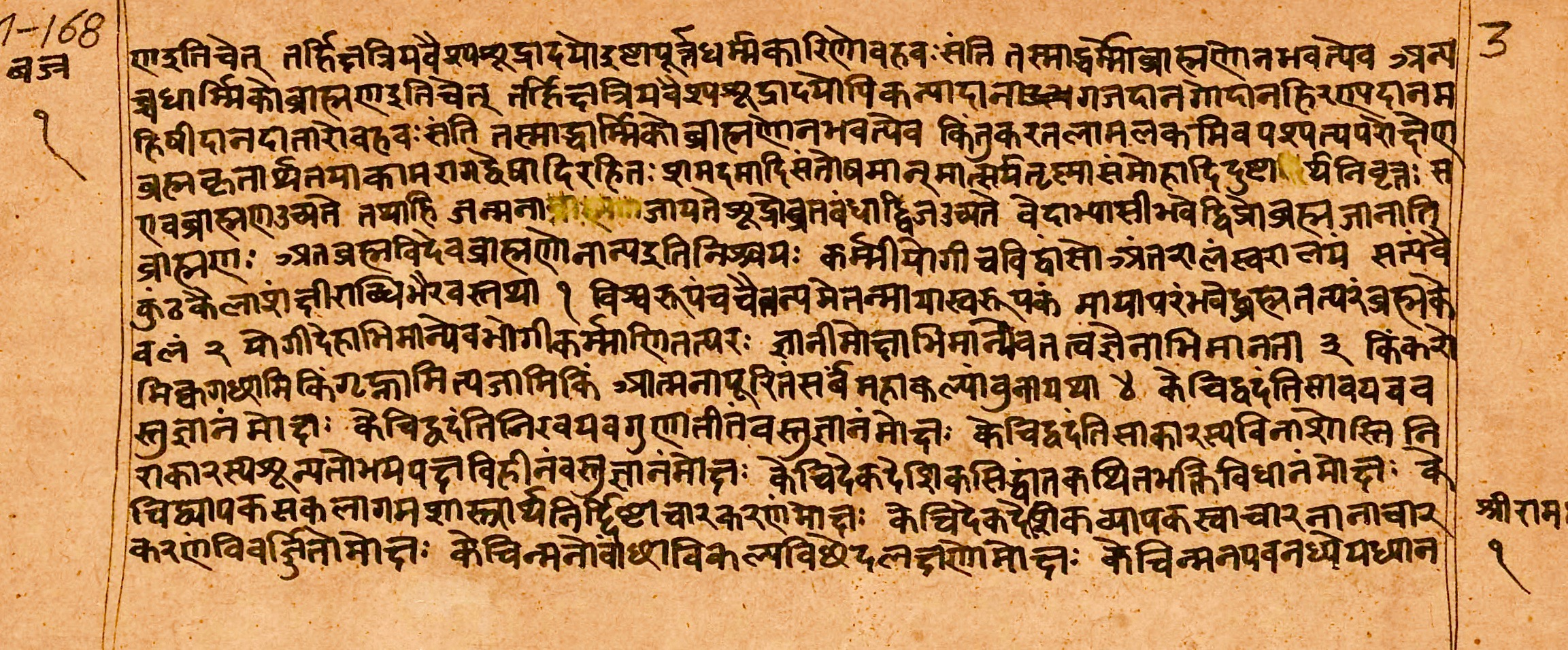
- Clockwise from top left: The encounter of a teacher and a disciple, giving rise to the etymology of the term "Upanishad"; Yama teaches Nachiketa in the Katha Upanishad; A manuscript of the minor Vajrasuchi Upanishad; The Upanishadic phrase "Tat Tvam Asi" displayed at the Sabarimala temple in Kerala

Information
- Religion: Hinduism
- Language: Sanskrit

The Upanishads (/ʊˈpʌnɪʃʌdz/; Sanskrit: उपनिषद्, IAST: Upaniṣad, pronounced [ˈupɐniʂɐd]) are Sanskrit texts of the late Vedic and post-Vedic periods that "document the transition from the archaic ritualism of the Veda into new religious ideas and institutions" and the emergence of the central religious concepts of Hinduism. (Note: Central concepts: Doniger (1990, pp. 2–3): "The Upanishads supply the basis of later Hindu philosophy; they are widely known and quoted by most well-educated Hindus, and their central ideas have also become a part of the spiritual arsenal of rank-and-file Hindus."; Dissanayake (1993, p. 39): "The Upanishads form the foundations of Hindu philosophical thought"; Patrick Olivelle (2014), The Early Upanisads, Oxford University Press, ISBN 978-0195352429, page 3: "Even though theoretically the whole of vedic corpus is accepted as revealed truth [shruti], in reality it is the Upanishads that have continued to influence the life and thought of the various religious traditions that we have come to call Hindu. Upanishads are the scriptures par excellence of Hinduism"; Michael McDowell and Nathan Brown (2009), World Religions, Penguin, ISBN 978-1592578467, pages 208-210.; These new concepts and practices include rebirth, samsara, karma, meditation, renunciation and moksha.(Olivelle 1998, pp. xx–xxiv) The Upanishadic, Buddhist and Jain renunciation traditions form parallel traditions, which share some common concepts and interests. While Kuru-Panchala, at the central Ganges Plain, formed the center of the early Upanishadic tradition, Kosala-Magadha at the central Ganges Plain formed the center of the other shramanic traditions.(Samuel 2010)) They are the most recent addition to the Vedas, the oldest scriptures of Hinduism, and deal with meditation, philosophy, consciousness, and ontological knowledge. Earlier parts of the Vedas dealt with mantras, benedictions, rituals, ceremonies, and sacrifices.

While among the most important literature in the history of Indian religions and culture, the Upanishads document a wide variety of "rites, incantations, and esoteric knowledge" departing from Vedic ritualism and interpreted in various ways in the later commentarial traditions. The Upanishads are widely known, and their diverse ideas, interpreted in various ways, informed later traditions of Hinduism. The central concern of all Upanishads is to discover the relations between ritual, cosmic realities (including gods), and the human body/person, postulating Ātman and Brahman as the "summit of the hierarchically arranged and interconnected universe", but various ideas about the relation between Atman and Brahman can be found. (Note: Oliville: "In this Introduction I have avoided speaking of 'the philosophy of the upanishads', a common feature of most introductions to their translations. These documents were composed over several centuries and in various regions, and it is futile to try to discover a single doctrine or philosophy in them.")

108 Upanishads are known, of which the first dozen or so are the oldest and most important and are referred to as the principal or main (mukhya) Upanishads. The mukhya Upanishads are found mostly in the concluding part of the Brahmanas and Aranyakas and were, for centuries, memorized by each generation and passed down orally. The mukhya Upanishads predate the Common Era, but there is no scholarly consensus on their date, or even on which ones are pre- or post-Buddhist. The Brihadaranyaka is seen as particularly ancient by modern scholars. Of the remainder, 95 Upanishads are part of the Muktikā canon, composed from about the last centuries of 1st-millennium BCE through about 15th-century CE. New Upanishads, beyond the 108 in the Muktika canon, continued to be composed through the early modern and modern era, though often dealing with subjects that are unconnected to the Vedas. The mukhya Upanishads, along with the Bhagavad Gita and the Brahmasutra (known collectively as the Prasthanatrayi), are interpreted in divergent ways in the several later schools of Vedanta. (Note: Vedanta has been interpreted as the "last chapters, parts of the Veda" and alternatively as "object, the highest purpose of the Veda".)

Translations of the Upanishads in the early 19th century started to attract attention from a Western audience. German philosopher Arthur Schopenhauer was deeply impressed by the Upanishads and called them "the most profitable and elevating reading which ... is possible in the world." Modern era Indologists have discussed the similarities between the fundamental concepts in the Upanishads and the works of major Western philosophers.

== Etymology ==
The Sanskrit term Upaniṣad originally meant “connection” or “equivalence", but came to be understood as "sitting near a teacher," from upa "by" and ni-ṣad "sit down", "sitting down near", referring to the student sitting down near the teacher while receiving spiritual knowledge (Gurumukh). Other dictionary meanings include "esoteric doctrine" and "secret doctrine". Monier-Williams's Sanskrit Dictionary notes – "According to native authorities, Upanishad means setting to rest ignorance by revealing the knowledge of the supreme spirit."

Adi Shankaracharya explains in his commentary on the Kaṭha and Brihadaranyaka Upanishad that the word means Ātmavidyā, that is, "knowledge of the self", or Brahmavidyā "knowledge of Brahman". The word appears in the verses of many Upanishads, such as the fourth verse of the 13th volume in the first chapter of the Chandogya Upanishad. Max Müller as well as Paul Deussen translate the word Upanishad in these verses as "secret doctrine", Robert Hume translates it as "mystic meaning", while Patrick Olivelle translates it as "hidden connections".

== Development ==
=== Authorship ===
The authorship of most Upanishads is unknown. Sarvapalli Radhakrishnan states, "almost all the early literature of India was anonymous, we do not know the names of the authors of the Upanishads". The ancient Upanishads are embedded in the Vedas, the oldest of Hinduism's religious scriptures, which some traditionally consider to be apauruṣeya, which means "not of a man, superhuman" and "impersonal, authorless". The Vedic texts assert that they were skillfully created by Rishis (sages), after inspired creativity, just as a carpenter builds a chariot.

The various philosophical theories in the early Upanishads have been attributed to famous sages such as Yajnavalkya, Uddalaka Aruni, Shvetaketu, Shandilya, Aitareya, Balaki, Pippalada, and Sanatkumara. Women, such as Maitreyi and Gargi, participate in the dialogues and are also credited in the early Upanishads. There are some exceptions to the anonymous tradition of the Upanishads. The Shvetashvatara Upanishad, for example, includes closing credits to sage Shvetashvatara, and he is considered the author of the Upanishad.

Many scholars believe that early Upanishads were interpolated and expanded over time. There are differences within manuscripts of the same Upanishad discovered in different parts of South Asia, differences in non-Sanskrit version of the texts that have survived, and differences within each text in terms of meter, style, grammar and structure. The existing texts are believed to be the work of many authors.

=== Chronology ===
Scholars are uncertain about when the Upanishads were composed. The chronology of the early Upanishads is difficult to resolve, states philosopher and Sanskritist Stephen Phillips, because all opinions rest on scanty evidence and analysis of archaism, style and repetitions across texts, and are driven by assumptions about likely evolution of ideas, and presumptions about which philosophy might have influenced which other Indian philosophies. Indologist Patrick Olivelle says that "in spite of claims made by some, in reality, any dating of these documents [early Upanishads] that attempts a precision closer than a few centuries is as stable as a house of cards".

Some scholars have tried to analyse similarities between Hindu Upanishads and Buddhist literature to establish chronology for the Upanishads. Precise dates are impossible, and most scholars give only broad ranges encompassing various centuries. Gavin Flood states that "the Upanisads are not a homogeneous group of texts. Even the older texts were composed over a wide expanse of time from about 600 to 300 BCE." Stephen Phillips places the early or "principal" Upanishads in the 800 to 300 BCE range.

Patrick Olivelle, a Sanskrit philologist and indologist, gives the following chronology for the early Upanishads, also called the Principal Upanishads:

- The Brihadaranyaka and the Chandogya are the two earliest Upanishads. They are edited texts, some of whose sources are much older than others. The two texts are pre-Buddhist; they may be placed in the 7th to 6th centuries BCE, give or take a century or so.
- The three other early prose Upanishads—Taittiriya, Aitareya, and Kausitaki come next; all are probably pre-Buddhist and can be assigned to the 6th to 5th centuries BCE.
- The Kena is the oldest of the verse Upanishads followed by probably the Katha, Isa, Svetasvatara, and Mundaka. All these Upanishads were composed probably in the last few centuries BCE. According to Olivelle, "All exhibit strong theistic tendencies and are probably the earliest literary products of the theistic tradition, whose later literature includes the Bhagavad Gita and the Puranas."
- The two late prose Upanishads, the Prasna and the Mandukya, cannot be much older than the beginning of the common era.

Meanwhile, the indologist Johannes Bronkhorst argues for a later date for the Upanishads than has generally been accepted. Bronkhorst places even the oldest of the Upanishads, such as the Brihadaranyaka as possibly still being composed at "a date close to Katyayana and Patañjali [the grammarian]" (i.e., c. 2nd century BCE).

The later Upanishads, numbering about 95, also called minor Upanishads, are dated from the late 1st-millennium BCE to mid 2nd-millennium CE. Gavin Flood dates many of the twenty Yoga Upanishads to be probably from the 100 BCE to 300 CE period. Patrick Olivelle and other scholars date seven of the twenty Sannyasa Upanishads to likely have been complete sometime between the last centuries of the 1st-millennium BCE to 300 CE. About half of the Sannyasa Upanishads were likely composed in 14th- to 15th-century CE.

=== Geography ===
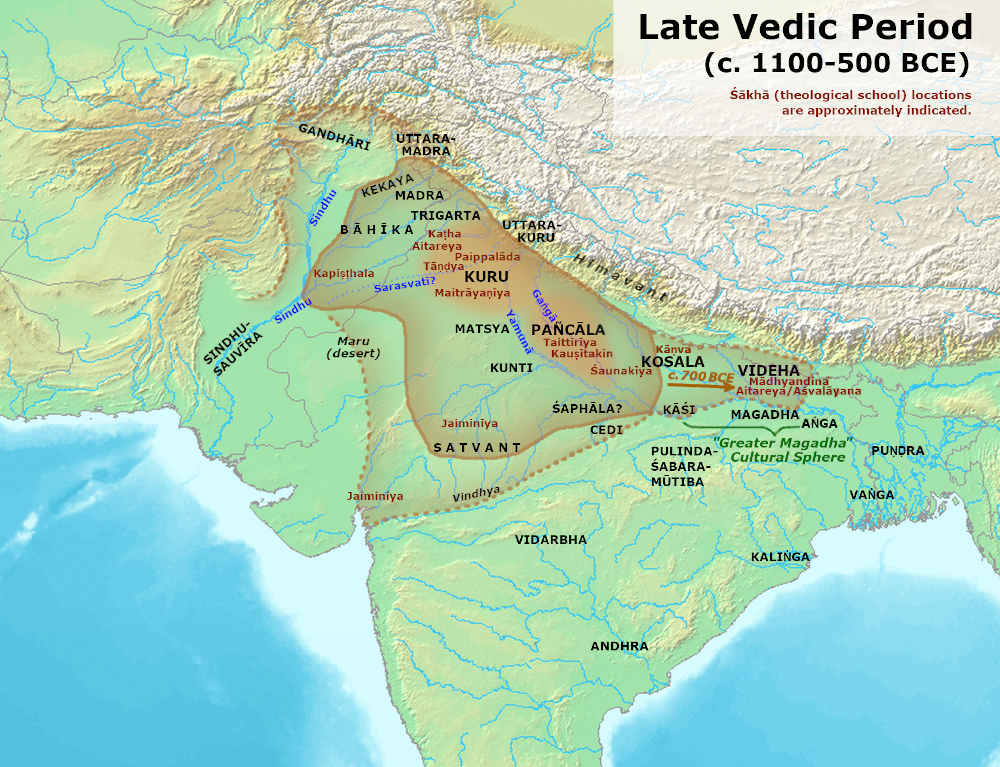
Geography of the Late Vedic Period

The general area of the composition of the early Upanishads is considered as northern India. The region is bounded on the west by the upper Indus valley, on the east by lower Ganges region, on the north by the Himalayan foothills, and on the south by the Vindhya mountain range. Scholars are reasonably sure that the early Upanishads were produced at the geographical center of ancient Brahmanism, Kuru-Panchala, and Kosala-Videha, a "frontier region" of Brahmanism, together with the areas immediately to the south and west of these. This region covers modern Bihar, Nepal, Uttar Pradesh, Uttarakhand, Himachal Pradesh, Haryana, eastern Rajasthan, and northern Madhya Pradesh.

While significant attempts have been made recently to identify the exact locations of the individual Upanishads, the results are tentative. Witzel identifies the center of activity in the Brihadaranyaka Upanishad as the area of Videha, whose king, Janaka, features prominently in the Upanishad. The Chandogya Upanishad was probably composed in a more western than eastern location in the Indian subcontinent, possibly somewhere in the western region of the Kuru-Panchala country.

Compared to the Principal Upanishads, the new Upanishads recorded in the Muktikā belong to an entirely different region, probably southern India, and are considerably relatively recent. In the fourth chapter of the Kaushitaki Upanishad, a location named Kashi (modern Varanasi) is mentioned.

== Classification ==
=== Muktika canon: major and minor Upanishads ===
There are more than 200 known Upanishads, one of which, the Muktikā Upanishad, predates 1656 CE and contains a list of 108 canonical Upanishads, including itself as the last. These are further divided into Upanishads associated with Shaktism (goddess Shakti), Sannyasa (renunciation, monastic life), Shaivism (god Shiva), Vaishnavism (god Vishnu), Yoga, and Sāmānya (general, sometimes referred to as Samanya-Vedanta).

Some of the Upanishads are categorized as "sectarian" since they present their ideas through a particular god or goddess of a specific Hindu tradition such as Vishnu, Shiva, Shakti, or a combination of these such as the Skanda Upanishad. These traditions sought to link their texts as Vedic, by asserting their texts to be an Upanishad, thereby a Śruti. Most of these sectarian Upanishads, for example the Rudrahridaya Upanishad and the Mahanarayana Upanishad, assert that all the Hindu gods and goddesses are the same, all an aspect and manifestation of Brahman, the Vedic concept for metaphysical ultimate reality before and after the creation of the Universe.

=== Principal Upanishads ===
The Principal Upanishads, also known as the Mukhya Upanishads, can be grouped into periods. Of the early periods are the Brihadaranyaka and the Chandogya, the oldest. (Note: These are believed to pre-date Gautam Buddha (c. 500 BCE))

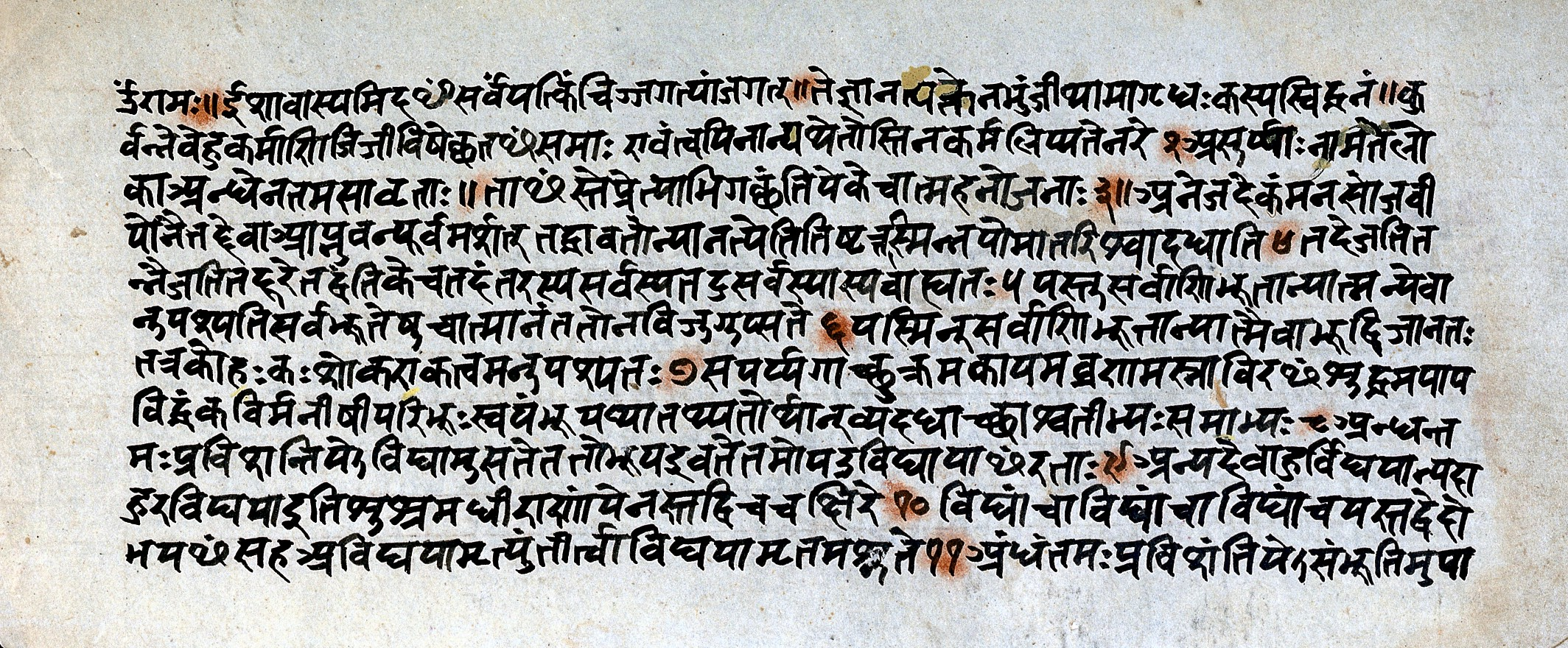
A page of Isha Upanishad manuscript

The Aitareya, Kauṣītaki and Taittirīya Upanishads may date to as early as the mid-1st millennium BCE, while the remnant date from between roughly the 4th to 1st centuries BCE, roughly contemporary with the earliest portions of the Sanskrit epics. One chronology assumes that the Aitareya, Taittiriya, Kausitaki, Mundaka, Prasna, and Katha Upanishads has Buddha's influence, and is consequently placed after the 5th century BCE, while another proposal questions this assumption and dates it independent of Buddha's date of birth. The Kena, Mandukya, and Isa Upanishads are typically placed after these Principal Upanishads, but other scholars date these differently. Not much is known about the authors except for those, like Yajnavalkayva and Uddalaka, mentioned in the texts. A few women discussants, such as Gargi and Maitreyi, the wife of Yajnavalkayva, also feature occasionally.

Each of the principal Upanishads can be associated with one of the schools of exegesis of the four Vedas (shakhas). Many Shakhas are said to have existed, of which only a few remain. The new Upanishads often have little relation to the Vedic corpus and have not been cited or commented upon by any great Vedanta philosopher: their language differs from that of the classic Upanishads, being less subtle and more formalized. As a result, they are not difficult to comprehend for the modern reader.

Veda-Shakha-Upanishad association
| Veda | Recension | Shakha | Principal Upanishad |
|---|---|---|---|
| Rig Veda | Only one recension | Shakala | Aitareya |
| Sama Veda | Only one recension | Kauthuma | Chāndogya |
| Sama Veda | Only one recension | Jaiminiya | Kena |
| Sama Veda | Only one recension | Ranayaniya | |
| Yajur Veda | Krishna Yajur Veda | Katha | Kaṭha |
| Yajur Veda | Krishna Yajur Veda | Taittiriya | Taittirīya |
| Yajur Veda | Krishna Yajur Veda | Maitrayani | |
| Yajur Veda | Krishna Yajur Veda | Hiranyakeshi (Kapishthala) | |
| Yajur Veda | Krishna Yajur Veda | Kathaka | |
| Yajur Veda | Shukla Yajur Veda | Vajasaneyi Madhyandina | Isha and Bṛhadāraṇyaka |
| Yajur Veda | Shukla Yajur Veda | Kanva Shakha | |
| Atharva Veda | Two recensions | Shaunaka | Māṇḍūkya and Muṇḍaka |
| Atharva Veda | Two recensions | Paippalada | Prashna Upanishad |

=== New Upanishads ===
There is no fixed list of the Upanishads beyond the Muktika anthology of 108 Upanishads as newer Upanishads have continued to be discovered and composed. In 1908, for example, four previously unknown Upanishads were discovered in newly found manuscripts, and these were named Bashkala, Chhagaleya, Arsheya, and Saunaka, by Friedrich Schrader, who attributed them to the first prose period of the Upanishads. The text of three of them, namely the Chhagaleya, Arsheya, and Saunaka, were incomplete and inconsistent, likely poorly maintained or corrupted.

Ancient Upanishads have long enjoyed a revered position in Hindu traditions, and authors of numerous sectarian texts have tried to benefit from this reputation by naming their texts as Upanishads. These "new Upanishads" number in the hundreds, cover diverse range of topics from physiology to renunciation to sectarian theories. They were composed between the last centuries of the 1st millennium BCE through the early modern era (~1600 CE). While over two dozen of the minor Upanishads are dated to pre-3rd century CE, many of these new texts under the title of "Upanishads" originated in the first half of the 2nd millennium CE, they are not Vedic texts, and some do not deal with themes found in the Vedic Upanishads.

The main Shakta Upanishads, for example, mostly discuss doctrinal and interpretative differences between the two principal sects of a major Tantric form of Shaktism called Shri Vidya upasana. The many extant lists of authentic Shakta Upaniṣads vary, reflecting the sect of their compilers, so that they yield no evidence of their "location" in Tantric tradition, impeding correct interpretation. The Tantra content of these texts also weaken its identity as an Upaniṣad for non-Tantrikas. Sectarian texts such as these do not enjoy status as shruti and thus the authority of the new Upanishads as scripture is not accepted in Hinduism.

=== Association with Vedas ===
All Upanishads are associated with one of the four Vedas—Rigveda, Samaveda, Yajurveda (there are two primary versions or Samhitas of the Yajurveda: Shukla Yajurveda, Krishna Yajurveda), and Atharvaveda. During the modern era, the ancient Upanishads that were embedded texts in the Vedas, were detached from the Brahmana and Aranyaka layers of Vedic text, compiled into separate texts and these were then gathered into anthologies of the Upanishads. These lists associated each Upanishad with one of the four Vedas. Many such lists exist but they are inconsistent across India in terms of which Upanishads are included and how the newer Upanishads are assigned to the ancient Vedas. In south India, the collected list based on Muktika Upanishad, (Note: The Muktika manuscript found in colonial era Calcutta is the usual default, but other recensions exist.) and published in Telugu language, became the most common by the 19th-century and this is a list of 108 Upanishads. In north India, a list of 52 Upanishads has been most common.

The Muktikā Upanishad's list of 108 Upanishads groups the first 13 as mukhya, (Note: Some scholars list ten as principal, while most consider twelve or thirteen as principal mukhya Upanishads.) 21 as Sāmānya Vedānta, 18 as Sannyāsa, 14 as Vaishnava, 14 as Shaiva, 8 as Shakta, and 20 as Yoga. The 108 Upanishads as recorded in the Muktikā are shown in the table below. The mukhya Upanishads are the most important and highlighted.

Veda-Upanishad association
| Veda | Number | Mukhya | Sāmānya | Sannyāsa | Śākta | Vaiṣṇava | Śaiva | Yoga |
|---|---|---|---|---|---|---|---|---|
| Ṛigveda | 10 | Aitareya | Ātmabodha, Mudgala | Nirvāṇa | Tripura, Saubhāgya-lakshmi, Bahvṛca | - | Akṣamālika | Nādabindu |
| Sāmaveda | 16 | Chāndogya, Kena | Vajrasūchi, Maha, Sāvitrī | Āruṇi, Maitreya, Brhat-Sannyāsa, Kuṇḍika (Laghu-Sannyāsa) | - | Vāsudeva, Avyakta | Rudrākṣa, Jābāli | Yogachūḍāmaṇi, Darśana |
| Kṛṣṇa Yajurveda | 32 | Taittiriya, Katha | Sarvasāra, Śukarahasya, Skanda, Garbha, Śārīraka, Ekākṣara, Akṣi | Brahma, (Laghu, Brhad) Avadhūta, Kaṭhasruti | Sarasvatī-rahasya | Nārāyaṇa, Kali-Saṇṭāraṇa, Mahānārāyaṇa (Tripād vibhuti), | Kaivalya, Kālāgnirudra, Dakṣiṇāmūrti, Rudrahṛdaya, Pañcabrahma | Amṛtabindu, Tejobindu, Amṛtanāda, Kṣurika, Dhyānabindu, Brahmavidyā, Yogatattva, Yogaśikhā, Yogakuṇḍalini, Varāha |
| Śukla Yajurveda | 19 | Īśa, Bṛhadāraṇyaka | Subala, Mantrika, Niralamba, Paingala, Adhyatma, Muktikā | Jābāla, Bhikṣuka, Turīyātītavadhuta, Yājñavalkya, Śāṭyāyaniya | - | Tārasāra | - | Advayatāraka, Haṃsa, Triśikhi, Maṇḍalabrāhmaṇa |
| Atharvaveda | 31 | Muṇḍaka, Māṇḍūkya, Praśna | Ātmā, Sūrya, Prāṇāgnihotra | Āśrama, Nārada-parivrājaka, Paramahamsa, Paramahaṃsa parivrājaka, Parabrahma | Sītā, Devī, Tripurātapini, Bhāvana | Nṛsiṃhatāpanī, Rāmarahasya, Rāmatāpaṇi, Gopālatāpani, Kṛṣṇa, Hayagrīva, Dattātreya, Gāruḍa | Atharvasiras, Atharvaśikha, Bṛhajjābāla, Śarabha, Bhasma, Gaṇapati | Śāṇḍilya, Pāśupata, Mahāvākya |
| Total Upaniṣads | 108 | 13 | 21 | 18 | 8 | 14 | 14 | 20 |

== Philosophy ==
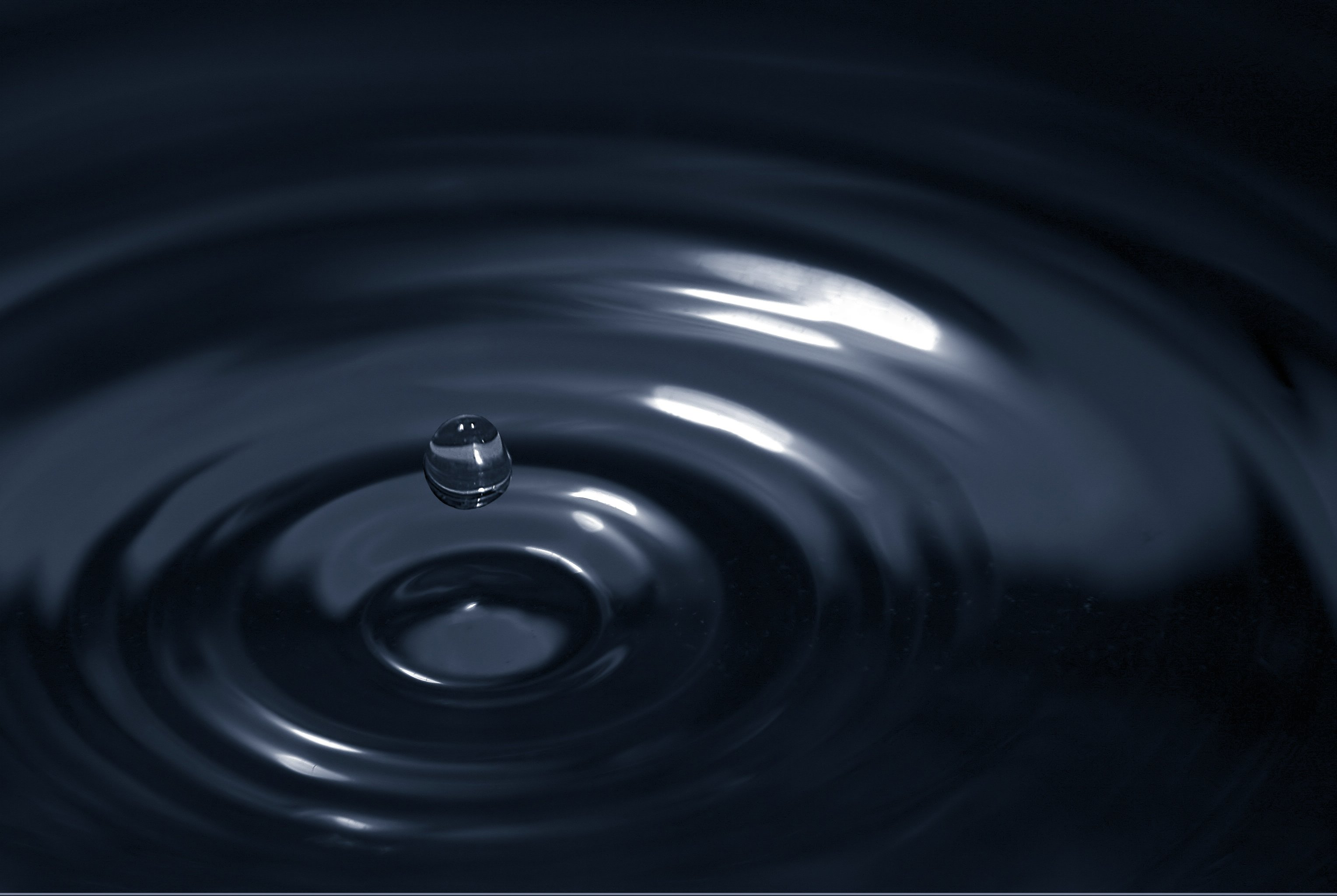
Impact of a drop of water, a common analogy for Brahman and the Ātman

The central concern of all Upanishads is to discover the relations between ritual, cosmic realities (including gods), and the human body/person, postulating Ātman and Brahman as the "summit of the hierarchically arranged and interconnected universe," but various ideas about the relation between Atman and Brahman can be found.

The Upanishads reflect a pluralism of worldviews. While some Upanishads have been deemed 'monistic', others, including the Katha Upanishad, are dualistic. The Maitri is one of the Upanishads that inclines more toward dualism, thus grounding classical Samkhya and Yoga schools of Hinduism, in contrast to the non-dualistic Upanishads at the foundation of its Vedanta school. They contain a plurality of ideas.

The Upanishads include sections on philosophical theories that have been at the foundation of Indian traditions. For example, the Chandogya Upanishad includes one of the earliest known declarations of Ahimsa (non-violence) as an ethical precept. Discussion of other ethical premises such as Damah (temperance, self-restraint), Satya (truthfulness), Dāna (charity), Ārjava (non-hypocrisy), Daya (compassion), and others are found in the oldest Upanishads and many later Upanishads. Similarly, the Karma doctrine is presented in the Brihadaranyaka Upanishad, which is the oldest Upanishad.

=== Development of thought ===
While the hymns of the Vedas emphasize rituals and the Brahmanas serve as a liturgical manual for those Vedic rituals, the spirit of the Upanishads is inherently opposed to ritual. The older Upanishads launch attacks of increasing intensity on the ritual. Anyone who worships a divinity other than the self is called a domestic animal of the gods in the Brihadaranyaka Upanishad. The Chāndogya Upanishad parodies those who indulge in the acts of sacrifice by comparing them with a procession of dogs chanting Om! Let's eat. Om! Let's drink.

The Kaushitaki Upanishad asserts that "external rituals such as Agnihotram offered in the morning and in the evening, must be replaced with inner Agnihotram, the ritual of introspection", and that "not rituals, but knowledge should be one's pursuit". The Mundaka Upanishad declares how man has been called upon, promised benefits for, scared unto and misled into performing sacrifices, oblations and pious works. Mundaka thereafter asserts this is foolish and frail, by those who encourage it and those who follow it, because it makes no difference to man's current life and after-life, it is like blind men leading the blind, it is a mark of conceit and vain knowledge, ignorant inertia like that of children, a futile useless practice. The Maitri Upanishad states,

The performance of all the sacrifices, described in the Maitrayana-Brahmana, is to lead up in the end to a knowledge of Brahman, to prepare a man for meditation. Therefore, let such man, after he has laid those fires, meditate on the Self, to become complete and perfect. But who is to be meditated on?

— Maitri Upanishad

The opposition to the ritual is not explicit in the oldest Upanishads. On occasions, the Upanishads extend the task of the Aranyakas by making the ritual allegorical and giving it a philosophical meaning. For example, the Brihadaranyaka interprets the practice of horse-sacrifice or ashvamedha allegorically. It states that the over-lordship of the earth may be acquired by sacrificing a horse. It then goes on to say that spiritual autonomy can only be achieved by renouncing the universe which is conceived in the image of a horse.

In similar fashion, Vedic gods such as the Agni, Aditya, Indra, Rudra, Visnu, Brahma, and others become equated in the Upanishads to the supreme, immortal, and incorporeal Brahman-Atman of the Upanishads, god becomes synonymous with self, and is declared to be everywhere, inmost being of each human being and within every living creature. The one reality or ekam sat of the Vedas becomes the ekam eva advitiyam or "the one and only and sans a second" in the Upanishads. Brahman-Atman and self-realization develops, in the Upanishad, as the means to moksha (liberation; freedom in this life or after-life).

According to Jayatilleke, the thinkers of Upanishadic texts can be grouped into two categories. One group, which includes early Upanishads along with some middle and late Upanishads, were composed by metaphysicians who used rational arguments and empirical experience to formulate their speculations and philosophical premises. The second group includes many middle and later Upanishads, where their authors professed theories based on yoga and personal experiences. Yoga philosophy and practice, adds Jayatilleke, is "not entirely absent in the Early Upanishads".

The development of thought in these Upanishadic theories contrasted with Buddhism, since the Upanishadic inquiry fails to find an empirical correlate of the assumed Atman, but nevertheless assumes its existence, "[reifying] consciousness as an eternal self." The Buddhist inquiry "is satisfied with the empirical investigation which shows that no such Atman exists because there is no evidence," states Jayatilleke.

=== Atman and Brahman ===
The Upanishads postulate Ātman and Brahman as the "summit of the hierarchically arranged and interconnected universe." Both have multiple meanings, and various ideas about the relation between Atman and Brahman can be found.

Atman has "a wide range of lexical meanings, including ‘breath’, ‘spirit’, and ‘body’." In the Upanishads it refers to the body, but also to the essence of the concrete physical human body, "an essence, a life-force, consciousness, or ultimate reality." The Chāndogya Upaniṣad (6.1-16) "offers an organic understanding of ātman, characterizing the self in terms of the life force that animates all living beings," while the Bṛhadāraṇyaka Upaniṣad "characterizes ātman more in terms of consciousness than as a life-giving essence."

Brahman may refer to a "formulation of truth," but also to "the ultimate and basic essence of the cosmos," standing at the "summit of the hierarchical scheme, or at the bottom as the ultimate foundation of all things." Brahman is "beyond the reach of human perception and thought." Atman likewise has multiple meanings, one of them being 'self', the inner essence of a human body/person. (Note: Atman: Atman, Oxford Dictionaries, Oxford University Press (2012): "1. real self of the individual; 2. a person's soul"; John Bowker (2000), The Concise Oxford Dictionary of World Religions, Oxford University Press, ISBN 978-0192800947, See entry for Atman; WJ Johnson (2009), A Dictionary of Hinduism, Oxford University Press, ISBN 978-0198610250, See entry for Atman (self); Richard King (1995), Early Advaita Vedanta and Buddhism, State University of New York Press, ISBN 978-0791425138, page 64 "Atman as the innermost essence or soul of man, and Brahman as the innermost essence and support of the universe. (...) Thus we can see in the Upanishads, a tendency towards a convergence of microcosm and macrocosm, culminating in the equating of Atman with Brahman".; Chad Meister (2010), The Oxford Handbook of Religious Diversity, Oxford University Press, ISBN 978-0195340136, page 63: "Even though Buddhism explicitly rejected the Hindu ideas of Atman ("soul") and Brahman, Hinduism treats Sakyamuni Buddha as one of the ten avatars of Vishnu."; David Lorenzen (2004), The Hindu World (Editors: Sushil Mittal and Gene Thursby), Routledge, ISBN 0-415215277, pages 208-209: "Advaita and nirguni movements, on the other hand, stress an interior mysticism in which the devotee seeks to discover the identity of individual soul (atman) with the universal ground of being (brahman) or to find god within himself".)

Various ideas about the relation between Atman and Brahman can be found. Two distinct, somewhat divergent themes stand out. Older upanishads state that Atman is part of Brahman but not identical, while younger Upanishads state that Brahman (Highest Reality, Universal Principle, Being-Consciousness-Bliss) is identical with Atman. The Brahmasutra by Badarayana (c. 100 BCE) synthesized and unified these somewhat conflicting theories. According to Nakamura, the Brahmasutras see Atman and Brahman as both different and not-different, a point of view which came to be called bhedabheda in later times. According to Koller, the Brahmasutras state that Atman and Brahman are different in some respects particularly during the state of ignorance, but at the deepest level and in the state of self-realization, Atman and Brahman are identical, non-different. This ancient debate flowered into various dual, non-dual theories in Hinduism.

=== Reality and Maya ===
Two different types of the non-dual Brahman-Atman are presented in the Upanishads, according to Mahadevan. The one in which the non-dual Brahman-Atman is the all-inclusive ground of the universe and another in which empirical, changing reality is an appearance (Maya).

The Upanishads describe the universe, and the human experience, as an interplay of Purusha (the eternal, unchanging principles, consciousness) and Prakṛti (the temporary, changing material world, nature). The former manifests itself as Ātman (soul, self), and the latter as Māyā. The Upanishads refer to the knowledge of Atman as "true knowledge" (Vidya), and the knowledge of Maya as "not true knowledge" (Avidya, Nescience, lack of awareness, lack of true knowledge).

Hendrick Vroom explains, "the term Maya [in the Upanishads] has been translated as 'illusion,' but then it does not concern normal illusion. Here 'illusion' does not mean that the world is not real and simply a figment of the human imagination. Maya means that the world is not as it seems; the world that one experiences is misleading as far as its true nature is concerned." According to Wendy Doniger, "to say that the universe is an illusion (māyā) is not to say that it is unreal; it is to say, instead, that it is not what it seems to be, that it is something constantly being made. Māyā not only deceives people about the things they think they know; more basically, it limits their knowledge."

In the Upanishads, Māyā is the perceived changing reality and it co-exists with Brahman which is the hidden true reality. Maya, or "illusion", is an important idea in the Upanishads, because the texts assert that in the human pursuit of blissful and liberating self-knowledge, it is Maya which obscures, confuses and distracts an individual.

== Schools of Vedanta ==
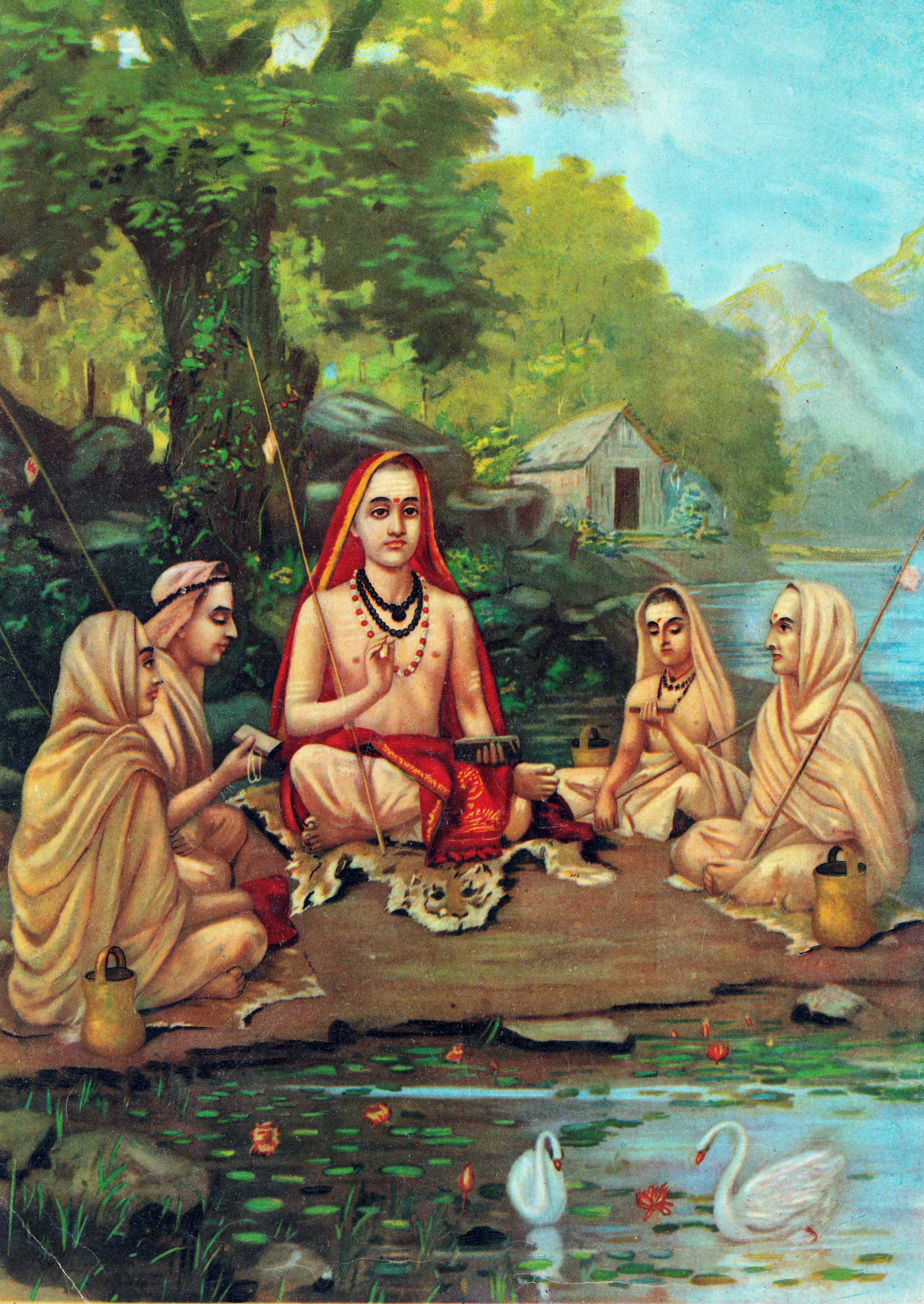
Adi Shankara, expounder of Advaita Vedanta and commentator (bhashya) on the Upanishads

The Upanishads form one of the three main sources for all schools of Vedanta, together with the Bhagavad Gita and the Brahmasutras. Due to the wide variety of philosophical teachings contained in the Upanishads, various interpretations could be grounded on the Upanishads. (Note: Collins 2000, p. 195: "The breakdown of the Vedic cults is more obscured by retrospective ideology than any other period in Indian history. It is commonly assumed that the dominant philosophy now became an idealist monism, the identification of atman (self) and Brahman (Spirit), and that this mysticism was believed to provide a way to transcend rebirths on the wheel of karma. This is far from an accurate picture of what we read in the Upanishads. It has become traditional to view the Upanishads through the lens of Shankara's Advaita interpretation. This imposes the philosophical revolution of about 700 C.E. upon a very different situation 1,000 to 1,500 years earlier. Shankara picked out monist and idealist themes from a much wider philosophical lineup.") The schools of Vedānta seek to answer questions about the relation between atman and Brahman, and the relation between Brahman and the world. The schools of Vedanta are named after the relation they see between atman and Brahman:

- According to Advaita Vedanta, there is no difference.
- According to Vishishtadvaita the jīvātman is a part of Brahman, and hence is similar, but not identical.
- According to Dvaita, all individual souls (jīvātmans) and matter as eternal and mutually separate entities.

Other schools of Vedanta include Nimbarkacharya's Svabhavika Bhedabheda, Vallabha's Suddhadvaita, and Chaitanya's Acintya Bhedabheda. The philosopher Adi Shankara has provided commentaries on 11 mukhya Upanishads.

=== Advaita Vedanta ===
Advaita literally means non-duality, and it is a monistic system of thought. It deals with the non-dual nature of Brahman and Atman. Advaita is considered the most influential sub-school of the Vedanta school of Hindu philosophy. Gaudapada was the first person to expound the basic principles of the Advaita philosophy in a commentary on the conflicting statements of the Upanishads. Gaudapada's Advaita ideas were further developed by Shankara (8th century CE). King states that Gaudapada's main work, Māṇḍukya Kārikā, is infused with philosophical terminology of Buddhism, and uses Buddhist arguments and analogies. King also suggests that there are clear differences between Shankara's writings and the Brahmasutra, and many ideas of Shankara are at odds with those in the Upanishads. Radhakrishnan, on the other hand, suggests that Shankara's views of Advaita were straightforward developments of the Upanishads and the Brahmasutra, and many ideas of Shankara derive from the Upanishads.

Shankara in his discussions of the Advaita Vedanta philosophy referred to the early Upanishads to explain the key difference between Hinduism and Buddhism, stating that Hinduism asserts that Atman (soul, self) exists, whereas Buddhism asserts that there is no soul, no self.

Shankara used four sentences from the Upanishads, called the Mahāvākyas (Great Sayings), to establish the identity of Atman and Brahman as scriptural truth:

- "Prajñānam brahma" - "Consciousness is Brahman" (Aitareya Upanishad)
- "Aham brahmāsmi" - "I am Brahman" (Brihadaranyaka Upanishad)
- "Tat tvam asi" - "That Thou art" (Chandogya Upanishad)
- "Ayamātmā brahma" - "This Atman is Brahman" (Mandukya Upanishad)

=== Bhedabheda ===
Vijñānabhikṣu countered Advaita emphasis on non-difference of the self and Brahman by pointing to statements from the Upanishads that support difference.

=== Vishishtadvaita ===
Ramanuja (1017–1137 CE), the main proponent of the Vishishtadvaita philosophy, disagreed with Adi Shankara and the Advaita school. Visistadvaita is a synthetic philosophy bridging the monistic Advaita and theistic Dvaita systems of Vedanta. Ramanuja frequently cited the Upanishads, and stated that Vishishtadvaita is grounded in the Upanishads.

Ramanuja's Vishishtadvaita interpretation of the Upanishads is that of qualified monism. Ramanuja interprets the Upanishadic literature to be teaching a body-soul theory, states Jeaneane Fowler – a professor of Philosophy and Religious Studies, where the Brahman is the dweller in all things, yet also distinct and beyond all things, as the soul, the inner controller, the immortal. The Upanishads, according to the Vishishtadvaita school, teach individual souls to be of the same quality as the Brahman, but quantitatively distinct.

In the Vishishtadvaita school, the Upanishads are interpreted to be teaching about Ishvara (Vishnu), who is the seat of all auspicious qualities, with all of the empirically perceived world as the body of God who dwells in everything. The school recommends a devotion to godliness and constant remembrance of the beauty and love of a personal god. This ultimately leads one to the oneness with abstract Brahman. The Brahman in the Upanishads is a living reality, states Fowler, and "the Atman of all things and all beings" in Ramanuja's interpretation.

=== Dvaita ===
The Dvaita school was founded by Madhvacharya (1199–1278 CE). It is regarded as a strongly theistic philosophic exposition of the Upanishads. Madhvacharya, much like Adi Shankara claims for Advaita, and Ramanuja claims for Vishishtadvaita, states that his theistic Dvaita Vedanta is grounded in the Upanishads.

According to the Dvaita school, states Fowler, the "Upanishads that speak of the soul as Brahman, speak of resemblance and not identity". Madhvacharya interprets the Upanishadic teachings of the self becoming one with Brahman, as "entering into Brahman", just like a drop enters an ocean. This to the Dvaita school implies duality and dependence, where Brahman and Atman are different realities. Brahman is a separate, independent and supreme reality in the Upanishads, Atman only resembles the Brahman in limited, inferior, dependent manner according to Madhvacharya.

Ramanuja's Vishishtadvaita school and Shankara's Advaita school are both nondualism Vedanta schools, both are premised on the assumption that all souls can hope for and achieve the state of blissful liberation; in contrast, Madhvacharya believed that some souls are eternally doomed and damned.

== Similarities with Platonic thought ==
Several scholars have recognised parallels between the philosophy of Pythagoras and Plato and that of the Upanishads, including their ideas on sources of knowledge, concept of justice and path to salvation, and Plato's allegory of the cave. Platonic psychology with its divisions of reason, spirit and appetite, also bears resemblance to the three Guṇas in the Indian philosophy of Samkhya. (Note: For instances of Platonic pluralism in the early Upanishads see Randall.)

Various mechanisms for such a transmission of knowledge have been conjectured including Pythagoras traveling as far as India; Indian philosophers visiting Athens and meeting Socrates; Plato encountering the ideas when in exile in Syracuse; or, intermediated through Persia.

However, other scholars, such as Arthur Berriedale Keith, J. Burnet and A. R. Wadia, believe that the two systems developed independently. They note that there is no historical evidence of the philosophers of the two schools meeting, and point out significant differences in the stage of development, orientation and goals of the two philosophical systems. Wadia writes that Plato's metaphysics were rooted in this life and his primary aim was to develop an ideal state. In contrast, Upanishadic focus was the individual, the self (atman, soul), self-knowledge, and the means of an individual's moksha (freedom, liberation in this life or after-life).

== Translations ==
The Upanishads have been translated into various languages including Persian, Italian, Urdu, French, Latin, German, English, Dutch, Polish, Japanese, Spanish and Russian. The Mughal Emperor Akbar's reign (1556–1586) saw the first translations of the Upanishads into Persian. His great-grandson, Dara Shukoh, produced a collection called Sirr-i-Akbar in 1656, wherein 50 Upanishads were translated from Sanskrit into Persian.

Anquetil-Duperron, a French Orientalist, received a manuscript of the Oupanekhat and translated the Persian version into French and Latin, publishing the Latin translation in two volumes in 1801–1802 as Oupnek'hat. The French translation was never published. More recently, several translations in French of some Upanishads or the whole of 108 have been published : by indianists Louis Renou, Kausitaki, Svetasvatra, Prasna, Taittiriya Upanisads, 1948; Jean Varenne, Mahâ-Nârâyana Upanisad, 1960, and Sept Upanishads, 1981; Alyette Degrâces-Fadh, Samnyâsa-Upanisad (Upanisad du renoncement), 1989; Martine Buttex, Les 108 Upanishads (full translation), 2012.

The Latin version was the initial introduction of the Upanishadic thought to Western scholars. However, according to Deussen, the Persian translators took great liberties in translating the text and at times changed the meaning.

The first Sanskrit-to-English translation of the Aitareya Upanishad was made by Colebrooke in 1805, and the first English translation of the Kena Upanishad was made by Rammohun Roy in 1816.

The first German translation appeared in 1832 and Eduard Roer's English version appeared in 1853. However, Max Mueller's 1879 and 1884 editions were the first systematic English treatment to include the 12 Principal Upanishads. Other major translations of the Upanishads have been by Robert Ernest Hume (13 Principal Upanishads), Paul Deussen (60 Upanishads), Sarvepalli Radhakrishnan (18 Upanishads), Patrick Olivelle (32 Upanishads in two books) and Bhānu Swami (13 Upanishads with commentaries of Vaiṣṇava ācāryas). Olivelle's translation won the 1998 A.K. Ramanujan Book Prize for Translation.

Throughout the 1930s, Irish poet W. B. Yeats worked with the Indian-born mendicant-teacher Shri Purohit Swami on their own translation of the Upanishads, eventually titled The Ten Principal Upanishads and published in 1938. This translation was the final piece of work published by Yeats before his death less than a year later.

== Reception in the West ==
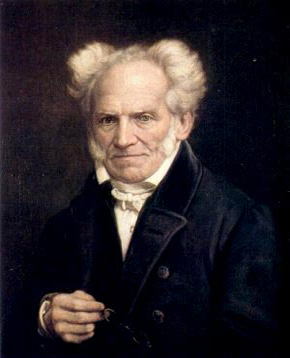
German 19th century philosopher Arthur Schopenhauer, impressed by the Upanishads, called the texts "the production of the highest human wisdom".

The German philosopher Arthur Schopenhauer read the Latin translation and praised the Upanishads in his main work, The World as Will and Representation (1819), as well as in his Parerga and Paralipomena (1851). He found his own philosophy in accord with the Upanishads, which taught that the individual is a manifestation of the one basis of reality. For Schopenhauer, that fundamentally real underlying unity is what we know in ourselves as "will". Schopenhauer used to keep a copy of the Latin Oupnekhet by his side and commented,

In the whole world there is no study so beneficial and so elevating as that of the Upanishads. It has been the solace of my life, it will be the solace of my death.

Schopenhauer's philosophy influenced many famous people and introduced them to the Upanishads. One of them was the Austrian physicist Erwin Schrödinger, who once wrote:

“There is obviously only one alternative,” he wrote, “namely the unification of minds or consciousnesses. Their multiplicity is only apparent, in truth there is only one mind. This is the doctrine of the Upanishads.”

Another German philosopher, Friedrich Wilhelm Joseph Schelling, praised the ideas in the Upanishads, as did others. In the United States, people known as the transcendentalists were influenced by the German idealists. Americans, such as Emerson and Thoreau embraced Schelling's interpretation of Kant's transcendental idealism, as well as his celebration of the romantic, exotic, mystical aspect of the Upanishads. As a result of the influence of these writers, the Upanishads gained renown in Western countries.

The poet T. S. Eliot, inspired by his reading of the Upanishads, based the final portion of his famous poem The Waste Land (1922) upon one of its verses. According to Eknath Easwaran, the Upanishads are snapshots of towering peaks of consciousness.

Juan Mascaró, a professor at the University of Barcelona and a translator of the Upanishads, states that the Upanishads represent for the Hindu approximately what the New Testament represents for the Christian, and that the message of the Upanishads can be summarized in the words, "the kingdom of God is within you".

Paul Deussen in his review of the Upanishads, states that the texts emphasize Brahman-Atman as something that can be experienced, but not defined. This view of the soul and self are similar, states Deussen, to those found in the dialogues of Plato and elsewhere. The Upanishads insisted on oneness of soul, excluded all plurality, and therefore, all proximity in space, all succession in time, all interdependence as cause and effect, and all opposition as subject and object. Max Müller, in his review of the Upanishads, summarizes the lack of systematic philosophy and the central theme in the Upanishads as follows,

There is not what could be called a philosophical system in these Upanishads. They are, in the true sense of the word, guesses at truth, frequently contradicting each other, yet all tending in one direction. The key-note of the old Upanishads is "know thyself," but with a much deeper meaning than that of the γνῶθι σεαυτόν of the Delphic Oracle. The "know thyself" of the Upanishads means, know thy true self, that which underlines thine Ego, and find it and know it in the highest, the eternal Self, the One without a second, which underlies the whole world.

— Max Müller

The English composer Gustav Holst based several works on Ancient Indian texts, including Hymns from the Rig Veda, The Cloud Messenger and the opera Sāvitri. The Upanishads was one of a small number of books that Holst kept with him for his whole life.

== See also ==
- The 100 Most Influential Books Ever Written
- Bhagavad Gita
- Hinduism
- Prasthanatrayi

== Sources ==
- Black, Brian, The Upaniṣads, Internet Encyclopedia of Philosophy
- Brodd, Jeffrey (2009), World Religions: A Voyage of Discovery, Saint Mary's Press, ISBN 978-0884899976
- Brooks, Douglas Renfrew (1990), The Secret of the Three Cities: An Introduction to Hindu Shakta Tantrism, The University of Chicago Press
- Chari, P. N. Srinivasa (1956), Sarvepalli Radhakrishnan (ed.), History of Philosophy Eastern and Western
- Chousalkar, Ashok (1986), Social and Political Implications of Concepts Of Justice And Dharma, Mittal Publications, archived from the original on 2 October 2022
- Collins, Randall (2000), The Sociology of Philosophies: A Global Theory of Intellectual Change, Harvard University Press, ISBN 0-674-00187-7
- Deussen, Paul (1908), The philosophy of the Upanishads, Alfred Shenington Geden, T. & T. Clark, ISBN 0-7661-5470-X
- Deussen, Paul (1997). Sixty Upanishads of the Veda. Vol. 2. Translated by Bedekar, V.M.; Palsule, G.B. Motilal Banarsidass. ISBN 978-81-208-1467-7.
- Deussen, P. (2010), The Philosophy of the Upanishads, Cosimo, ISBN 978-1-61640-239-6
- Dissanayake, Wiman (1993), "Introduction to Part Two", in Kasulis, Thomas P. (ed.), Self as Body in Asian Theory and Practice, State University of New York Press, ISBN 978-0791410806
- Doniger, Wendy (1990), Textual Sources for the Study of Hinduism (1st ed.), University of Chicago Press, ISBN 978-0226618470
- Doniger, Wendy; Gold, Ann G.; Smith, Brian K. (2023), Hinduism - The Upanishads, Encyclopedia Britannica
- Easwaran, Eknath (2007), The Upanishads, Nilgiri Press, ISBN 978-1-58638-021-2
- Eliot, T. S. (1963), Collected Poems, 1909-1962, New York: Harcourt, Brace & World, ISBN 0-15-118978-1
- Encyclopædia Britannica, Advaita, archived from the original on 5 May 2015
- Fields, Gregory P (2001), Religious Therapeutics: Body and Health in Yoga, Āyurveda, and Tantra, SUNY Press, ISBN 0-7914-4916-5
- Flood, Gavin D. (1996), An Introduction to Hinduism, Cambridge University Press, ISBN 978-0521438780
- Glucklich, Ariel (2008), The Strides of Vishnu: Hindu Culture in Historical Perspective, Oxford University Press, ISBN 978-0-19-531405-2
- Heehs, Peter (2002), Indian religions: a historical reader of spiritual expression and experience, NYU Press, ISBN 978-0-8147-3650-0
- Holdrege, Barbara A. (1995), Veda and Torah, Albany: SUNY Press, ISBN 0-7914-1639-9
- Jayatilleke, K.N. (1963), Early Buddhist Theory of Knowledge (1st ed.), London: George Allen & Unwin Ltd., archived from the original (PDF) on 24 December 2018
- Joshi, Kireet (1994), The Veda and Indian culture: an introductory essay, Motilal Banarsidass, ISBN 978-81-208-0889-8, archived from the original on 24 January 2021
- Keith, Arthur Berriedale (2007). The Religion and Philosophy of the Veda and Upanishads. Motilal Banarsidass Publishers. ISBN 978-81-208-0644-3. Archived from the original on 30 June 2020.
- King, Richard (1999), Indian philosophy: an introduction to Hindu and Buddhist thought, Edinburgh University Press, ISBN 0-87840-756-1
- King, Richard (1995), Early Advaita Vedānta and Buddhism: the Mahāyāna context of the Gauḍapādīya-kārikā, Gauḍapāda, State University of New York Press, ISBN 978-0-7914-2513-8
- Klostermaier, Klaus K. (2007), A survey of Hinduism, SUNY Press, ISBN 978-0-585-04507-8
- Lochtefeld, James (2002), "Brahman", The Illustrated Encyclopedia of Hinduism, Vol. 1: A–M, Rosen Publishing, ISBN 978-0823931798
- Mackenzie, Matthew (2012), "Luminosity, Subjectivity, and Temporality: An Examination of Buddhist and Advaita views of Consciousness", in Kuznetsova, Irina; Ganeri, Jonardon; Ram-Prasad, Chakravarthi (eds.), Hindu and Buddhist Ideas in Dialogue: Self and No-Self, Routledge
- Mahadevan, T. M. P (1956), Sarvepalli Radhakrishnan (ed.), History of Philosophy Eastern and Western, George Allen & Unwin Ltd
- Monier-Williams (1976), A Sanskrit-English Dictionary, Motilal Banarsidass, ISBN 0-8426-0286-0, archived from the original on 26 February 2021
- Müller, F. Max (1899), The science of language founded on lectures delivered at the royal institution in 1861 AND 1863, ISBN 0-404-11441-5, archived from the original on 2 October 2022
- Müller, Friedrich Max (1900), The Upanishads Sacred books of the East The Upanishads, Friedrich Max Müller, Oxford University Press
- Nakamura, Hajime (2004), A history of early Vedānta philosophy, vol. 2, Trevor Leggett, Motilal Banarsidass
- Olivelle, Patrick (1996). Upanisads. Oxford University Press. ISBN 978-0192835765.
- Olivelle, Patrick (1998). The Early Upanisads. Oxford University Press. ISBN 978-0195124354.
- Olivelle, Patrick (1992). The Samnyasa Upanisads. Oxford University Press. ISBN 978-0195070453.
- Panikkar, Raimundo (2001), The Vedic experience: Mantramañjarī : an anthology of the Vedas for modern man and contemporary celebration, Motilal Banarsidass, ISBN 978-81-208-1280-2
- Parmeshwaranand, Swami (2000), Encyclopaedic Dictionary of Upanisads, Sarup & Sons, ISBN 978-81-7625-148-8
- Samuel, Geoffrey (2010), The Origins of Yoga and Tantra. Indic Religions to the Thirteenth Century, Cambridge University Press
- Radhakrishnan, Sarvepalli (1956), Sarvepalli Radhakrishnan (ed.), History of Philosophy Eastern and Western, George Allen & Unwin Ltd
- Raghavendrachar, Vidvan H. N (1956), Sarvepalli Radhakrishnan (ed.), History of Philosophy Eastern and Western
- Raju, P.T. (1985), Structural Depths of Indian Thought, State University of New York Press, ISBN 978-0887061394
- Ranade, R. D. (1926), A constructive survey of Upanishadic philosophy, Bharatiya Vidya Bhavan
- Rinehart, Robin (2004), Robin Rinehart (ed.), Contemporary Hinduism: ritual, culture, and practice, ABC-CLIO, ISBN 978-1-57607-905-8
- Schopenhauer, Arthur; Payne, E. F.J (2000), E. F. J. Payne (ed.), Parerga and paralipomena: short philosophical essays, vol. 2 of Parerga and Paralipomena, E. F. J. Payne, Oxford University Press, ISBN 978-0-19-924221-4, archived from the original on 3 April 2021
- Schrader, Friedrich Otto; Adyar Library (1908), A descriptive catalogue of the Sanskrit manuscripts in the Adyar Library, Oriental Pub. Co
- Sen, Sris Chandra (1937), "Vedic literature and Upanishads", The Mystic Philosophy of the Upanishads, General Printers & Publishers
- Sharma, Shubhra (1985), Life in the Upanishads, Abhinav Publications, ISBN 978-81-7017-202-4
- Singh, N.K (2002), Encyclopaedia of Hinduism, Anmol Publications PVT. LTD, ISBN 978-81-7488-168-7
- Tripathy, Preeti (2010), Indian religions: tradition, history and culture, Axis Publications, ISBN 978-93-80376-17-2, archived from the original on 30 June 2020
- Urwick, Edward Johns (1920), The message of Plato: a re-interpretation of the "Republic", Methuen & Co. Ltd., ISBN 9781136231162, archived from the original on 27 October 2013
- Varghese, Alexander P. (2008), India : History, Religion, Vision And Contribution To The World, vol. 1, Atlantic Publishers & Distributors, ISBN 978-81-269-0903-2, archived from the original on 30 April 2017
- Versluis, Arthur (1993), American transcendentalism and Asian religions, Oxford University Press US, ISBN 978-0-19-507658-5, archived from the original on 2 October 2022
- Wadia, A.R. (1956), "Socrates, Plato and Aristotle", in Radhakrishnan, Sarvepalli (ed.), History of Philosophy Eastern and Western, vol. II, George Allen & Unwin Ltd.
- Raju, P. T. (1992), The Philosophical Traditions of India, Delhi: Motilal Banarsidass Publishers Private Limited
