= Mundaka Upanishad =

Ancient Sanskrit scripture of Hinduism

Mundaka
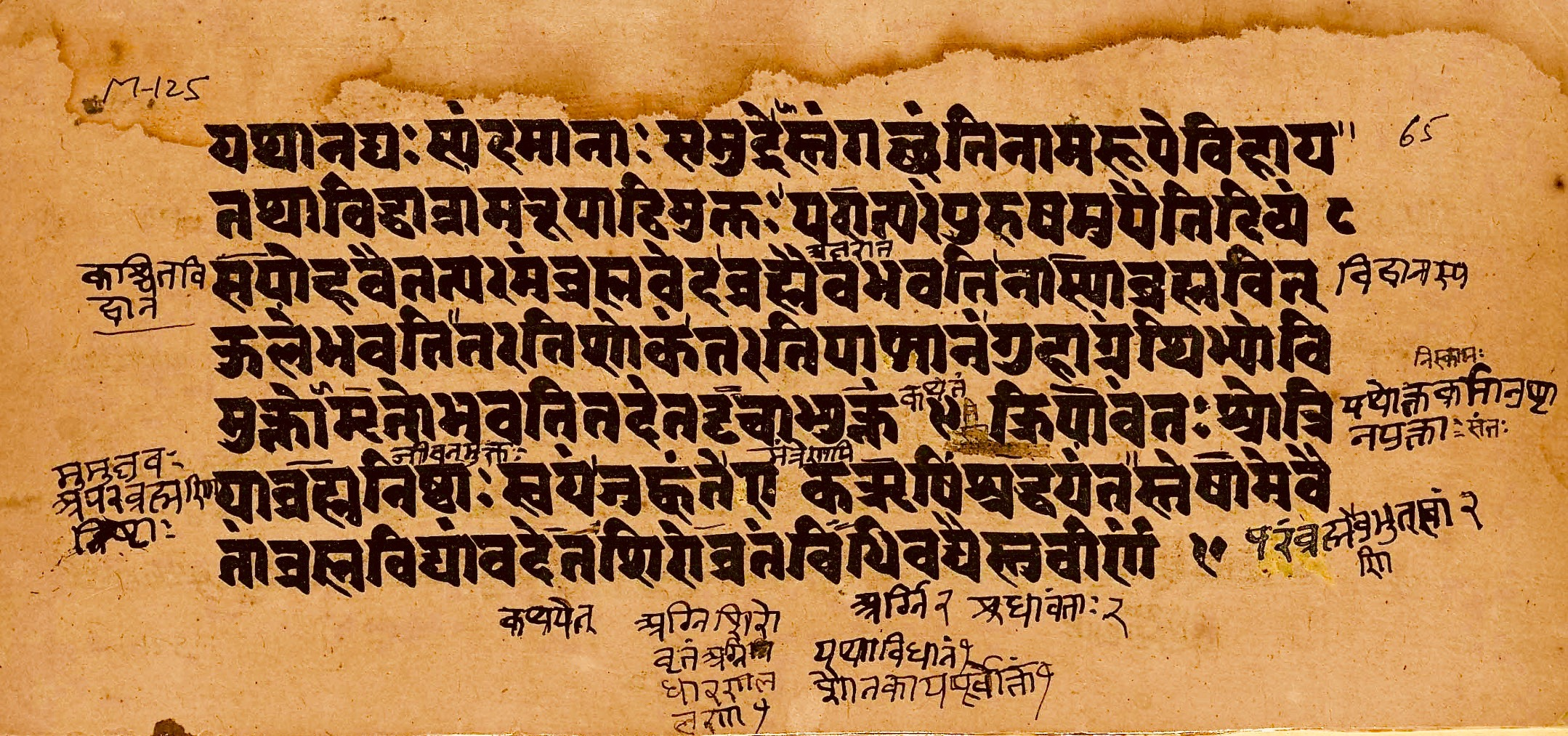
- Mundaka Upanishad verses 3.2.8 to 3.2.10 (Sanskrit, Devanagari script)
- Devanagari: मुण्डक
- IAST: Muṇḍaka
- Date: 1st millennium BCE
- Type: Mukhya Upanishad
- Linked Veda: Atharvaveda
- Commented by: Adi Shankara, Madhvacharya

The Mundaka Upanishad (Sanskrit: मुण्डकोपनिषद्, Muṇḍakopaniṣad) is an ancient Sanskrit Vedic text, embedded inside Atharva Veda. It is a Mukhya (primary) Upanishad, and is listed as number 5 in the Muktika canon of 108 Upanishads of Hinduism. It is among the most widely translated Upanishads.

It is presented as a dialogue between sage Saunaka and sage Angiras. It is a poetic verse style Upanishad, with 64 verses, written in the form of mantras. However, these mantras are not used in rituals, rather they are used for teaching and meditation on spiritual knowledge.

The Mundaka Upanishad contains three Mundakams (parts), each with two khandas (sections). The first Mundakam, states Roer, defines the science of "Higher Knowledge" and "Lower Knowledge", and then asserts that acts of oblations and pious gifts are foolish, and do nothing to reduce unhappiness in current life or next, rather it is knowledge that frees. The second Mundakam describes the nature of the Brahman, the Self, the relation between the empirical world and the Brahman, and the path to know Brahman. The third Mundakam expands the ideas in the second Mundakam and then asserts that the state of knowing Brahman is one of freedom, fearlessness, complete liberation, self-sufficiency and bliss.

Some scholars suggest that passages in the Mundaka Upanishad present the pantheism theory.

In some historic Indian literature and commentaries, the Mundaka Upanishad is included in the canon of several verse-structured Upanishads that are collectively referred to as "Mantra Upanishad" or "Mantropanishad".

== Etymology ==
Mundaka (Sanskrit: मुण्डक) literally means "shaved" (as in shaved head) or "shorn", and can also refer to the lopped trunk of a tree. The root of this term is unclear; Eduard Roer suggests it may allude to "knowledge that shaves, or liberates, one of errors and ignorance". In ancient and medieval texts, the Mundaka Upanishad's individual chapters are also referred to as "mundakam", though the etymological basis for this usage is also unclear.

== Chronology ==
The exact chronology of the Mundaka Upanishad, like other Vedic texts, is unclear. All opinions rest on scanty evidence, an analysis of archaism, style and repetitions across texts, driven by assumptions about likely evolution of ideas, and on presumptions about which philosophy might have influenced which other Indian philosophies.

Stephen Phillips dates the Mundaka Upanishad as a relatively later age ancient Upanishad, well after the Brihadaranyaka, Chandogya, Isha, Taittiriya, Aitareya, Kena, and Katha Upanishads. Paul Deussen considers the Mundaka Upanishad to be composed in a period where poetic expression of ideas became a feature of ancient Indian literary works.

Patrick Olivelle writes: "Both the Mundaka and the Mahanarayana are rather late Upanisads and are, in all probability, post-Buddhist."

Most of the teachings in the Upanishads of Hinduism, including the Mundaka Upanishad, however, relate to the existence of Self and Brahman, and the paths to know, realize one's Self and Brahman, making the fundamental premise of the Mundaka Upanishad distinctly different from Buddhism's denial of "Self or Brahman".

Some of the ideas and allegories in the Mundaka Upanishad have chronological roots in more ancient Vedic literature such as the Brihadaranyaka, Chandogya, and Katha Upanishads. For example, the allegory of "blind leading the blind" in section 1.2 of the Mundaka Upanishad is also found in section 1.2 of the Katha Upanishad. Similarly, the allegory of two birds in section 3.1 of the Mundaka Upanishad is found in hymns of Rig Veda, I.164.

== Structure ==
The Mundaka Upanishad has three Mundakams (parts, or shavings), each part has two khanda (खण्ड, section or volume). The section 1.1 has 9 mantras structured as metered poetic verses. Section 1.2 has 13 verses, section 2.1 has 10 verses, section 2.2 has 11 verses, section 3.1 has 10, and the last section 3.2 has 11 verses. In total, the Upanishad features 64 mantras.

Several versions of the Mundaka Upanishad manuscript have been discovered so far. They show minor differences, particularly in the form of additional text insertions and interpolations. The insertions are apparent because they do not fit structurally into the metered verses, and also because the same text is missing in manuscripts discovered in other locations.

== Content ==
The Mundaka Upanishad opens with declaring Brahma as the first of gods, the creator of the universe, and the knowledge of Brahman (Ultimate Reality, Eternal Principle, Cosmic Self) to be the foundation of all knowledge.

The text then lists a succession of teachers who shared the knowledge of Brahman with the next generation. It describes a lineage of knowledge transmission that begins with Brahma, the creator god, who imparted the knowledge of Brahman to Atharva. Atharva then passed this knowledge to Angira, and in turn, it was taught to Satyavaha Bharadvaja. Satyavaha then conveyed it to Angiras. Charles Johnston suggests that this announces the Vedic tradition of teacher-student responsibility to transfer knowledge across the generations, in unbroken succession. Johnston further states that the names recited are metaphors, such as the One who Illuminates, Keeper of Truth, Planetary Spirit, mythological messenger between Gods and Men among others, suggesting the divine nature and the responsibility of man to continue the tradition of knowledge sharing across human generations.

=== The higher knowledge versus lower knowledge - First Mundakam ===
In verse 1.1.3 of Mundaka Upanishad, Saunaka (a Grihastha) approaches Angiras (a teacher), and asks,

कस्मिन्नु भगवो विज्ञाते सर्वमिदं विज्ञातं भवतीति ॥ ३ ॥

Sir, what is that through which, if it is known, everything else becomes known?

— Mundaka Upanishad, 1.1.3, Translated by Max Müller

The setting of this question is significant, states Johnston, because it asserts that knowledge transfer is not limited to older teachers to young students, rather, even adult householders sought knowledge as pupils from teachers in Vedic tradition.

Angiras answered, states verse 1.1.4 of the Mundaka Upanishad, by classifying all knowledge into two: "lower knowledge" (apara vidya) and "higher knowledge" (para vidya). Hume calls these two forms of knowledge as "traditions of religion" and "knowledge of the eternal" respectively. The lower knowledge includes knowledge of four Vedas, phonetics, grammar, etymology, meter, astrology, and the knowledge of sacrifices and rituals. Some manuscripts of Manduka Upanishad expand the list of lower knowledge to include logic, history, Puranas and Dharma. The higher knowledge is the means by which one can comprehend the imperishable (Aksara, Brahman). It is the knowledge of Brahman - the one which cannot be seen, seized, has no origin, varna, eyes, ears, hands, or feet; it is the eternal, all-pervading, infinitesimal, imperishable, indestructible.

In verse 1.1.7, the Upanishad uses the analogy of a spider to illustrate the relationship between the manifest and unmanifest aspects of existence and to recognize the imperishable as the source and essence of all that is:

Just as a spider spins out and holds (the threads of the web)

just as the plants sprout forth out of the earth, just as hair grow on the head and body of a man who lives,

similarly everything that is here arises out of the imperishable one.

— Mundaka Upanishad, 1.1.7

=== Sacrifices, oblations and pious works are useless, knowledge useful - First Mundakam ===
The first seven mantras of second khanda of first Mundakam explain how man has been called upon, promised benefits for, scared unto and misled into performing sacrifices, oblations and pious works. In verses 1.2.7 through 1.2.10, the Upanishad asserts this is foolish and frail, by those who encourage it and those who follow it, because it makes no difference to man's current life and after-life, it is like blind men leading the blind, it is a mark of conceit and vain knowledge, ignorant inertia like that of children, a futile useless practice.

But frail, in truth, are those boats, the sacrifices, the eighteen, in which these ceremonies have been told,
Fools who praise this as the highest good, are subject again and again to old age and death.
Fools dwelling in darkness, wise in their own conceit, and puffed up with vain knowledge,
go round and round, staggering to and fro, like blind men led by the blind.

— Mundaka Upanishad, 1.2.7 - 1.2.8

The Mundaka Upanishad, in verses 1.2.11 through 1.2.13, asserts spiritual knowledge liberates man, and those who undertake Sannyasa (renunciation) to attain such knowledge achieve it through Tapas (meditation, austerity), living a simple and tranquil life on alms, without any sacrifices and rituals. In verses 1.2.12 and 1.2.13, the Upanishad suggests that "perishable acts cannot lead to eternal knowledge", instead it encourages seekers to gain knowledge from a learned spiritual teacher (guru) focused on Brahman.

=== Brahman is the inner Self of all things - Second Mundakam ===
Mundaka Upanishad, in the first section of the second Mundakam, defines and expounds on the doctrine of Atman-Brahman. It asserts that just like a blazing fire creates thousand sparks and leaping flames in its own form, beings are brought forth from Brahman in its form. The Brahman is imperishable, without body, it is both without and within, never produced, without mind, without breath, yet from it emerges the inner Self of all things. From Brahman is born breath, mind, sensory organs, space, air, light, water, earth, everything. The section expands this idea as follows:

The sky is his head, his eyes the sun and the moon,
the quarters his ears, his speech the Vedas disclosed,
the wind his breath, his heart the universe,
from his feet came the earth, he is indeed the inner Self of all things.

From him comes fire, the sun being the fuel,
from the soma comes the rain, from the earth the herbs,
the male pours the seed into the female,
thus many beings are begotten from the Purusha.

From him come the Rig verses, the Saman chants, the Yajus formulae, the Diksha rites,
all sacrifices, all ceremonies and all gifts,
the year too, the sacrificers, the worlds,
where the moon shines brightly, as does sun.

From him, too, gods are manifold produced,
the celestials, the men, the cattle, the birds,
the breathing, the rice, the corn, the meditation,
the Shraddha (faith), the Satya (truth), the Brahmacharya, and the Vidhi (law).

— Mundaka Upanishad, 2.1.4 - 2.1.7

The section continues on, asserting Brahman as the cause of mountains, rivers of every kind, plants, herbs and all living beings, and it is "the inner Self that dwells in all beings". Brahman is everything, the empirical and the abstract, the object, the subject and the action (karma).

This is a form of pantheism theory, that continues into the second section of the second Mundakam of the Upanishad.

=== Om, Self and Brahman - Second Mundakam ===
The Mundaka Upanishad, in the second Mundakam, teaches that true wisdom comes from understanding the self and realizing its unity with Brahman. True wisdom is attained by understanding one's self. It asserts that Brahman is beyond sensory perception, known through intellect purified by spiritual knowledge and meditation, not mere reading of Vedas. Such knowledge, coupled with renunciation and meditation, leads to liberation. Adi Shankara, in his review of the Mundaka Upanishad, calls the meditation as Yoga.

In verse 2.2.2, the Mundaka Upanishad asserts that Atman-Brahman is the real. In verse 2.2.3, it offers an aid to the meditation process, namely Om (Aum). The poetic verse is structured as a teacher-pupil conversation, where the teacher calls the pupil as a friend, as follows:

The second part of the Mundaka Upanishad discusses Om as a means of meditation for self-realization.

That which is flaming, which is subtler than the subtle,
on which the worlds are set, and their inhabitants -
That is the indestructible Brahman.
It is life, it is speech, it is mind. That is the real. It is immortal.
It is a mark to be penetrated. Penetrate It, my friend.

Taking as a bow the great weapon of the Upanishad,
one should put upon it an arrow sharpened by meditation,
Stretching it with a thought directed to the essence of That,
Penetrate that Imperishable as the mark, my friend.

Om is the bow, the arrow is the Self, Brahman the mark,
By the undistracted man is It to be penetrated,
One should come to be in It,
as the arrow becomes one with the mark.

— Mundaka Upanishad, 2.2.2 - 2.2.4

The Upanishad, in verse 2.2.8 asserts that the man with the knowledge of the Self and who has become one with Brahman, is liberated, is not affected by karman, is free of sorrow and self-doubts, is one who lives in bliss.

=== Reach the highest Oneness in all beings - Third Mundakam ===
The third Mundakam begins with the allegory of two birds, as follows,

Two birds, inseparable friends, cling to the same tree.
One of them eats the sweet fruit, the other looks on without eating.
On the same tree man sits grieving, drowned (in sorrow), bewildered, feeling helpless,
But when he sees the other Isa (lord) content, knows his glory, his grief passes away.
When the seer sees the brilliant maker and Isa as the Purusha who has his source in Brahman,
then he is wise, he shakes off good and evil, stainless he reaches the highest oneness.

— Mundaka Upanishad, 3.1.1 - 3.1.2

Mathur states that this metaphor of the birds sitting on the same tree refers to one being the empirical self and the other as the eternal and transcendental self. It is the knowledge of eternal self, Atman-Brahman and its Oneness with all others, that liberates. The Upanishad states in verse 3.1.4 that the Self is the life of all things, and there is delight in this Self (Ātman).

These early verses of the third Mundakam have been variously interpreted. To theist schools of Hinduism, the Isa is God. To non-theist schools of Hinduism, the Isa is Self. The theosophist Charles Johnston explains the theistic view, not only in terms of schools of Hinduism, but as a mirroring the theism found in Christianity and other scriptures around the world. These verses, states Johnston, describe the sorrow that drowns those who are unaware or feel separated from their Lord. The disciple, when firmly understands his individuality, reaches for meaning beyond individuality, discovers Lord, discovers the wonderful complex life of Eternal God, states Johnston, and then he is on the way of "light of lights". Johnston quotes from Isaiah and Revelation, thus: "The Lord shall be unto thee an everlasting light, and thy God thy glory".

Adi Shankara's commentary offers, as an example, an alternative interpretation in Hinduism. Shankara explains the non-dualistic view as follows: "By meditation and different paths of Yoga, man finds the other, not subject to the bondage of Samsara, unaffected by grief, ignorance, decay and death. He thinks thus: I am the atman, alike in all, seated in every living thing and not the other; this universe is mine, the lord of all; then he becomes absolved of all grief, released entirely from the ocean of grief, i.e. his object is accomplished". This is the state, asserts Shankara, free of grief, when man reaches the supreme equality which is identity with the Brahman. The equality in matters involving duality in certainly inferior to this, states Shankara.

=== Be ethical, know yourself, be tranquil - Third Mundakam ===
The last section of the Mundaka Upanishad asserts the ethical precepts necessary for man to attain the knowledge of the Brahman and thus liberation.

सत्येन लभ्यस्तपसा ह्येष आत्मा सम्यग्ज्ञानेन ब्रह्मचर्येण नित्यम् । Through continuous pursuit of Satya (truthfulness), Tapas (perseverance, austerity), Samyajñāna (correct knowledge), and Brahmacharya, one attains Atman (Self).

— Mundaka Upanishad, 3.1.5

Through ethical practices combined with meditation, must a man know his Self. Atman-Brahman is not perceived, states the Upanishad, by the eye, nor by speech, nor by other senses, not by penance, nor by karma of rituals. It is known to those whose nature has become purified by the serene light of knowledge, who meditate on it, who dwell unto it. This is the state, asserts Mundaka Upanishad, when one's thoughts is integrated and interwoven with one's body and all else. When thoughts are pure, the Self arises, states verse 3.1.9. This state of man is the state of Bhuti (भूति, inner power, prosperity and happiness).

In the second section of the third Mundakam, the Upanishad asserts, "the Self cannot be realized by those who lack inner strength, nor by the careless or heedless, nor by devotion or false notions of austerity, nor by knowledge of the empirical. It is obtained by the Self by which it is desired. His Self reveals its own truth". Once such self-knowledge is reached, calmness of mind results, a life of liberation emerges, one becomes and behaves like the Brahman. He is beyond sorrow, he is beyond sin, he is in tranquil union with the Self of all.

== Reception ==
The Mundaka Upanishad has been widely translated, as well as commented upon in Bhasya by ancient and medieval era Indian scholars such as Shankara and Anandagiri. Mundaka has been one of the most popular Upanishads, in past and present. Badarayana devotes three out of twenty eight adhikaranas to Mundaka Upanishad, while Shankara cites it 129 times in his commentary on the Brahmasutra. Deussen states that this popularity is because of the literary accomplishment, purity in expression and the beauty of the verses in expressing the profound thoughts that are otherwise shared by other Upanishads of Hinduism.

Gough calls Mundaka Upanishad as "one of the most important documents in ancient Indian philosophy". It encapsulates the Vedic teachings, states Gough, that "he that meditates upon any deity as a being other than himself has no knowledge, and is mere victim to the gods", and "there is no truth in the many, all truth is in the one; and this one that alone is the Self, the inmost essence of all things, that vivifies all sentiencies and permeates all things. This is the pure bliss, and it dwells within the heart of every creature".

Ross, in his chapters on "meaning of life in Hinduism", frequently cites Mundaka Upanishad, and states it to be an example of ancient efforts in India to refine tools and discipline of realizing liberation or Moksha.

Johnston states that the ancient message in Mundaka Upanishad is relevant to the modern age where "search for and application of Truth" alone often predominates the fields of science. Mundaka Upanishad reminds the central importance of Truth in its third Mundakam, yet it also emphasizes the need for "beauty and goodness", because "truth, beauty and goodness" together, states Johnston, create arts, music, poetry, painting, meaning and spiritual answers.

Jacobs has called Mundaka Upanishad as profound, and counts it as one of the essential philosophical foundations of Hinduism.

== Cultural impact ==
Emblem of India with tagline phrase from the Mundaka Upanishad.

The Mundaka Upanishad is the source of the phrase Satyameva Jayate, which is the national motto of India. It appears in its national emblem with four lions.

सत्यमेव जयते नानृतं
Translation 1: Only Truth triumphs, not falsehood.
Translation 2: Truth ultimately triumphs, not falsehood.
Translation 3: The true prevails, not the untrue.

— Mundaka Upanishad, 3.1.6

== See also ==
- Upanishads
- Vedas
- Brahman
- Atman
- Moksha
- Hinduism
