= Nirvana Upanishad =

Minor Upanishad of Hinduism

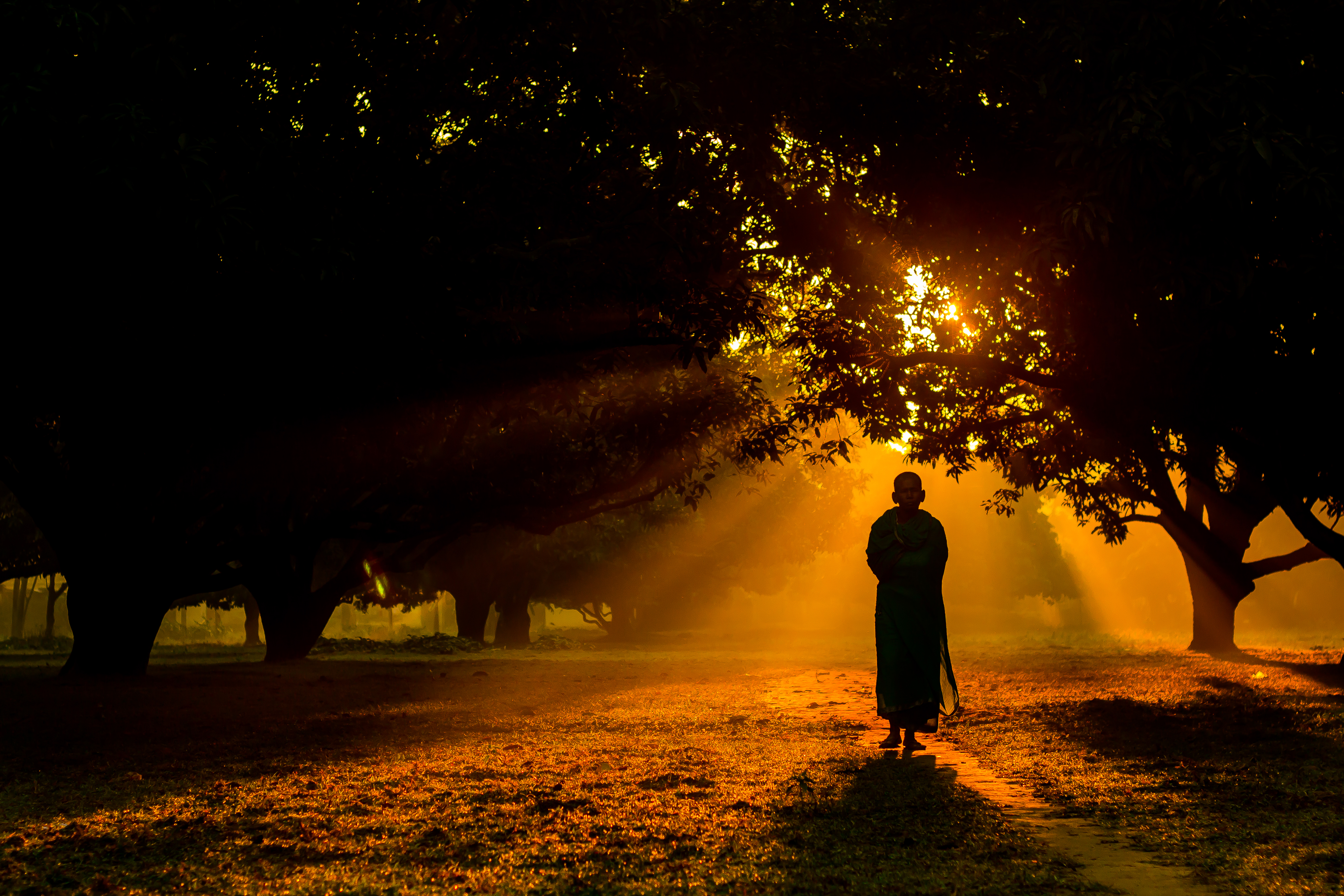
- The Upanishad describes a Sannyasi
- Devanagari: निर्वाणोपनिषत्
- IAST: Nirvana
- Title means: Liberation, highest bliss
- Date: before 300 AD, likely BC
- Type: Sannyasa
- Linked Veda: Rigveda
- Chapters: 1
- Verses: 82 sutras
- Philosophy: Vedanta

The Nirvana Upanishad (Sanskrit: निर्वाण उपनिषत्, IAST: Nirvāṇa Upaniṣad) is an ancient sutra-style Sanskrit text and a minor Upanishad of Hinduism. The text is attached to the Rig Veda, and is one of the 20 Sannyasa (renunciation) Upanishads. It is a short text and notable for its distilled, aphoristic presentation with metaphors and allegories.

The Nirvana Upanishad describes the sannyasi (renouncer), his character and his state of existence as he leads the monastic life in the Hindu Ashrama tradition. The Upanishad is notable for not mentioning any rites of passage, qualifications or discussion of the sannyasi's life before renunciation. It just describes the Sannyasi, his external state, his inner state.

The Upanishad asserts that the life of the sannyasi is of reflection, not rituals, dedicated to Jnana-kanda (knowledge section of the Vedas), finding home when he is in union with truth and perfection. Self-knowledge is his journey and destination, a solitary place his monastery of bliss.

== History ==
The composition date or author of Nirvana Upanishad is unknown, but its sutra-style suggests that it originated in the sutra text period (final centuries of the 1st-millennium BC), before it was compiled and classified as an Upanishad. This text was likely composed in the centuries around the start of common era.

Gavin Flood dates the Sannyasa Upanishads like Nirvana Upanishad to the first few centuries of the common era.

This text has been sometimes titled as Nirvanopanishad in manuscripts. In the Telugu language anthology of 108 Upanishads of the Muktika canon, narrated by Rama to Hanuman, it is listed at number 47.

== Contents ==
The universe of Sannyasi

The sky is his belief.
His knowledge is of the absolute.
Union is his initiation.
Compassion alone is his pastime.
Bliss is his garland.
The cave of solitude is his fellowship.
His teaching:
Hamsa abides in the heart of every being.
Fortitude is his patched garment.
Investigation is his staff (walking stick).
Happiness is his sandals.
Union with the truth, the perfect is his monastery.
The primordial Brahman is self-knowledge.
A solitary place is his monastery of bliss.
The non-dual Being and Bliss is his divinity.
The soundless is his mantra.
His own nature is his liberation.

—Nirvana Upanishad (Abridged, Tr: Patrick Olivelle)

The Nirvana Upanishad is written in Sutra-style. A Sutra means "string, thread", and in Indian literary traditions, it also refers to an aphorism or a collection of aphorisms in the form of a condensed manual or text. Each sutra is like a theorem distilled into few words or syllables, around which "teachings of ritual, philosophy, grammar or any field of knowledge" can be woven. This Upanishad deals with Vedanta philosophy.

The aphoristic style implies that the text can be interpreted with multiple meanings, is full of metaphors and allegories, and its sutras implicitly refer to Hindu scriptures. "The sky is his belief" in its third sutra for example, states Patrick Olivelle, is a metaphor for consciousness, spanning everything visible yet indivisible; it also means that the sannyasi is not enslaved to any specific doctrine but instead follows his own consciousness, his own conception of the absolute.

The text asserts that the life of the sannyasi is of reflection, not rituals. Jnana-kanda (knowledge section of the Vedas) is the scripture of the sannyasi, states the Upanishad, and not the section on Karma-kanda (rituals section of the Vedas). He is marked by fearlessness, fortitude, equanimity, a conduct that is both respectful of others and his own wishes, he does not revile others nor find faults in others, states the Upanishad. The verse 36–37 of the text asserts a position reverse of the Sunyavada of Buddhism, states Olivelle, where the Hindu sannyasi does not accept void-emptiness as ultimate reality, but believes Atman-Brahman as the ultimate reality. The primordial Brahman, states sutra 40 of the text, is self-knowledge for the renouncer.

The sannyasi finds home when he is in union with truth and perfection, states sutra 38 of the text. Self-knowledge is his journey and destination. His state is of an entranced mind, solitude his monastery. He is virtuous, he knows no fear, no delusions, no grief, no anger, no selfishness, no egotism. He contemplates on the true nature, silence is his mantra, he conducts himself as he pleases, his own nature is his liberation, translates Olivelle.

== Reception ==
The text is obscure, states T.M.P. Mahadevan, while Paul Deussen states the text may have been a memory aid that went with the glossary sections of the 108 Upanishads, namely the Sarvasara Upanishad and Niralamba Upanishad.

Patrick Olivelle concurs with Deussen and considers this Upanishad as an early text in the Sutra tradition of Hinduism. The text, state Olivelle, has a distinct Advaita Vedanta of Hindu philosophy flavor, like most Sannyasa Upanishads, but this may be because major Hindu monasteries of 1st millennium AD belonged to the Advaita Vedanta tradition.

Buddhadasa, a Thai Buddhist, in a commentary on Nirvana between two Indian religions, states that the Upanishad's view is that an eternal, uncreated Atman exists. In contrast, states Buddhadasa, there is no Atman terminology in Buddhism.

== See also ==
- Aruni Upanishad
- Jabala Upanishad
- Paramahamsa Upanishad
- Sarvasara Upanishad
