= Sarvasara Upanishad =

- This Upanishad is a glossary of key words in Vedanta
- Devanagari: सर्वसार
- IAST: Sarvasāra
- Title means: Essence of the whole
- Date: Late medieval
- Type: Samanya
- Linked Veda: Yajurveda
- Chapters: 1
- Verses: 23
- Philosophy: Vedanta

The Sarvasara Upanishad (Sanskrit: सर्वसार उपनिषत्, IAST: Sarvasāra Upaniṣad) is a Sanskrit text and is one of the 22 Samanya (general) Upanishads of Hinduism. The text, along with the Niralamba Upanishad, is one of two dedicated glossaries embedded inside the collection of ancient and medieval era 108 Upanishads.

The text exists in two versions, one attached to the Atharvaveda in many Sanskrit anthologies, and another attached to the Krishna Yajurveda in some anthologies such as the Telugu-language version. The two versions have some differences, but are essentially similar in meaning.

Sarvasara Upanishad defines and explains 23 Upanishadic concepts, while Niralamba Upanishad covers 29. These two texts overlap in some concepts, both refer to older Principal Upanishads (dated to 1st millennium BCE), but offer independent explanations suggesting that accepting a diversity of views were a part of its tradition.

== History ==
The date and author of Sarvasara Upanishad is unknown, but it is likely a late medieval text like the Muktika Upanishad.

Manuscripts of this text are also found titled as Sarva-Upanisatsara, Sarva Upanishad, Sarvasar Upanishad, Sarva-upanishad-sara and Sarvasaropanishad. In the Telugu language anthology of 108 Upanishads of the Muktika canon, narrated by Rama to Hanuman, it is listed at number 33. The text is also found in the early 19th-century Henry Thomas Colebrooke anthology of Upanishads popular in North India, and in the Narayana compilation of Upanishads popular in South India.In the collection of Upanishads under the title "Oupanekhat", put together by Sultan Mohammed Dara Shikhoh in 1656, consisting of a Persian translation of 50 Upanishads and who prefaced it as the best book on religion, the Sarvasara is listed at number 11 and is named Sarb. Oupanekhat also lists Sarbsar, but both Max Müller and Paul Deussen state that the misnamed text in the Persian compilation is not Sarvasar Upanishad.

== Contents ==
What is bondage?

The Atman (Self) is God. When, however, one fancies the body etc which is not the Atman, to be Atman then this fancy is called bondage.

—Sarvasara Upanishad (Tr: Deussen)

The Sarvasara Upanishad is written in the style of glossary of Vedanta terms.

The text begins by listing twenty three questions, such as what is Moksha, what is Avidya and what is Vidya? It then follows with twenty three answers. The manuscript version of the Sarvasara Upanishad in Atharvaveda discuss the last two questions differently than the manuscript of the same text attached to the Krishna Yajurveda.

The glossary in Sarvasara Upanishad in collections where it attached to Atharvaveda, covers the following twenty three words: Bandha (bondage), Moksha (liberation), Avidya (incorrect knowledge), Vidya (correct knowledge), Jagrat (waking consciousness), Swapna (dream sleep consciousness), Sushupti (dreamless deep sleep consciousness), Turiyam (fourth stage of consciousness), Annamaya, Pranamaya, Manomaya, Vijnanamaya, Anandamaya, Kartar, Jiva, Kshetrajna, Saksin, Kutastha, Antaryamin, Pratyagatman, Paramatman, Atman and Maya.

The glossary in manuscript versions, found in different parts of India, where the text is attached to Krishna Yajurveda include a more extensive discussion of the following concepts in the last two questions: Brahman (ultimate reality), Satya (truth), Jnana (wisdom), Ananta (eternal), Ananda (bliss), Mithya (illusion) and Maya (not Atman). The first 21 of 23 questions in both versions cover the same topics.

Jnana or wisdom

Jnana is self-light. It is that which illuminates all. It is that Absolute Consciousness which is without any obscuration.

—Sarvasara Upanishad (Tr: Aiyar)

Brahman, in the Sarvasara text, is Absolute Consciousness, without a second, a Be-ness, nondual, pure, the noumenal, the true and the unchanging. Satya, states the Upanishad, is Sat (Be-ness), what is not Asat (not-Be-ness), that which the Vedas aim at, that neither changes with time nor is affected by time, that which existed in past and exists now and will exist in future without change, that which is the fountainhead of all ideas and all causes.

The explanation of Maya in the Sarvasara Upanishad has been referenced in modern scholarship. According to Chattopadhyay, the Sarvasara definition is of the Shruti (Hindu scripture). Maya, states Sarvasara, means that "which is neither unreal (non-existent), nor real (existent), and nor is it simultaneously existent and non-existent; it is that which has no beginning but has an end; it is that which exists in the empirical plane in so far as one does not imagine it, it is that which is ever changing and non-Atman".

== See also ==
- Brihadaranyaka Upanishad
- Chandogya Upanishad
- Nirvana Upanishad
- Sariraka Upanishad
