= Niralamba Upanishad =

Hindu religious text

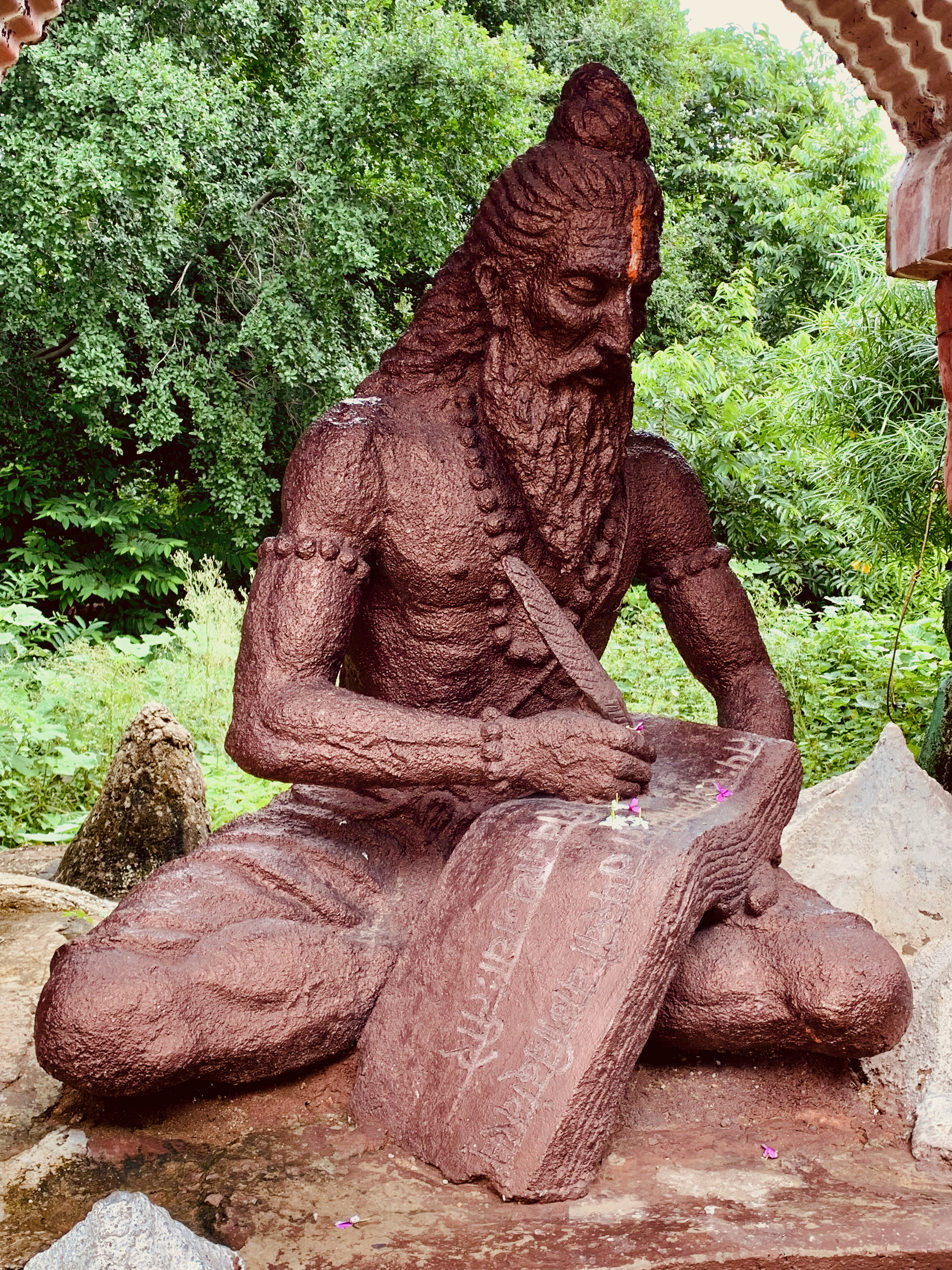
- The text is a glossary of Vedantic terms
- Devanagari: निरालम्ब
- IAST: Nirālamba
- Title means: Self-supported or independent
- Date: Late medieval
- Type: Samanya
- Linked Veda: Shukla Yajurveda
- Chapters: 1
- Verses: 41
- Philosophy: Vedanta

The Niralamba Upanishad (Sanskrit: निरालम्ब उपनिषत्, IAST: Nirālamba) is a Sanskrit text and is one of the 22 Samanya (general) Upanishads of Hinduism. The text, along with the Sarvasara Upanishad, is one of two dedicated glossaries embedded inside the collection of ancient and medieval era 108 Upanishads, on 29 basic concepts of Hindu philosophy.

Niralamba Upanishad defines and explains 29 Upanishadic concepts. It is notable for stating that men, women, all living beings, Hindu gods such as Vishnu and Rudra (Shiva), are in their essence just the same ultimate reality that is Brahman. It is also notable for describing "bondage" as doing sacrifice rituals and selfishness of any form, and for defining "demoniacal" as the life of performing fasts or muttering prayers while harboring "cruel desire, hatred and hypocrisy".

The text presents answers resonant with the Advaita Vedanta school of Hinduism.

== History ==
The Niralamba Upanishad's authorship and date of writing is not known, but it is likely a late medieval text similar to the Muktika Upanishad.

Manuscripts of this text are also found titled as Niralambopanisad. In the Telugu language anthology of 108 Upanishads of the Muktika canon, narrated by Rama to Hanuman, it is listed at number 34.

== Contents ==
The Niralamba Upanishad is a glossary of Vedanta terms, after an invocation prayer, opens with asking a series of questions, followed by sequential answers. The questions are asked in the format – what is Brahman? who is Ishvara? who is Jīva? what is Prakṛti and so on. The glossary list of the text includes Paramāṭmā, Brahmā, Vishṇu, Ruḍra, Indra, Yama, Sūrya, Chandra, Ḍevas, Rākshasas, Piśāchas, Men, Women, Living beings, Fixed objects, Brahmins and others, Jāti, Karma, Akarma, Jñāna, Ajñāna, Sukha, Duḥkha, Svarga, Naraka, Bandha, Mokṣa, Upasya, Śiṣya, Vidvān, Mudha, Asura, Ṭapas, Paramapada, Grahya, Agrahya and Saṃnyāsī.

What is Brahman?

Without divisions or classification, without beginning and without end. Pure, Peace, without qualities, Formless, Eternal Bliss, Indivisible, one and only without a second, Supreme Consciousness.

—Niralamba Upanishad 1,
Transl: Mahasaya

The text is notable for giving the same answer to sixteen questions. It states all of the following is just one and the same identity called Brahman (ultimate reality), divisions are false – Paramatma, Brahma, Vishnu, Rudra, Indra, Yama, Surya, Chandra, Devas, Asuras, Pisachas, men, women, all life creatures, fixed matter, Brahmins and others. The Ishvara and the Jiva are both explained by the Upanishad to be manifestation of Brahman, while Prakriti is explained as Shakti (potency, energy, power) of the Brahman.

Jnana in verse 24, says B. R. Rajam Lyer, means knowledge of the truth that the unchanging existence in the Universe is Brahman, who is Chaitanya or consciousness. It is that, asserts the text, which is seer and the seen, all pervading, the realization of the Self that is same in everyone, realized by subduing the senses, by serving the Guru (teacher), and by learning and meditating on Vedantic doctrines.

Ajnana is contrasted by the text in verse 25, as the illusion that the Atman (soul, self) within oneself is different from the soul in angels, other living beings, men, women, or because of castes or orders of life, or because something moves and something is fixed, and it is the ignorance that the Atman is different from the all-pervasive Brahman that is the nature of everything.

Sukha (happiness) is defined by the text as the state of realizing one's innate bliss, experiencing satcitananda. Dukha (pain) is being driven by the mundane, the state of non-Self, the lack of self-knowledge. Swarga (heaven) is association with spiritual Truth, while Naraka is craving after mundane existence.

What is Jati (caste)?

जातिरिति च । न चर्मणो न रक्तस्य न मांसस्य न चास्थिनः । न जातिरात्मनो जातिर्व्यवहारप्रकल्पिता ।
What is Jati? It cannot refer to the skin, or the blood, or the flesh or the bone. There is no Jati for Atman (soul). It is made up behavior.

—Niralamba Upanishad 21

The verse 30 of this Upanishad, defines Bandha, literally bondage. Any thought process or mental fixation on Ajnana is bondage, states the text. The thought that something is "mine" eternally is bondage, as is thinking that one can develop eight Siddhis (psychic) powers, the thought of propitiating gods, angels or men is bondage, asserts the Upanishad. Accepting and performing the duties of one's order of life (Ashrama) or caste is bondage, states the text. Seeking knowledge of the rules of sacrificial rituals or rites, making vows or undertaking austerity is bondage. Accepting fear or doubt to be the nature of one's soul is bondage, according to Niralamba Upanishad. The desire for anything, including moksha is bondage.

Moksha is defined by the text in verse 31, as abandoning bondage, knowing what is eternal and what is transient, and being in the eternal. The Vidwan, or the learned, states the text, is one who has cognized the unchanging reality of his consciousness that is latent in everyone. The Mudha, literally the ignorant, is one who egoistically conceives that the body or caste or Ashrama or actor or enjoyer or such is what matters.

Tapas, states the text is the act of burning in the knowledge that the unchanging truth is Brahman and the universe is Maya. Demoniacal is that, asserts the Upanishad, where one practices austerity and Japa (muttering mantras) while simultaneously living a life that harbors "cruel desire, hatred, pain and hypocrisy" of any kind. Sannyasi, defines the text, is that person who has given up "I and mine", who is convinced that "I am Brahman" and everyone, everything is Brahman, there are no multitudes, there is just oneness.

== See also ==
- Atma Upanishad
- Nirvana Upanishad
- Yogatattva Upanishad
- Vedas
