= Eduard Röer =

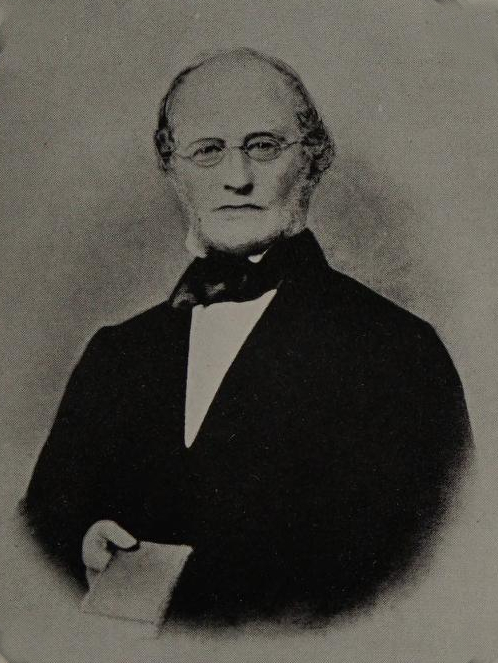

Johann "Hans" Heinrich Eduard Röer (26 October 1805 – 17 March 1866) was a German philosopher, linguist, and scholar of Sanskrit literature and Indology. He worked in India at the Asiatic Society of Bengal, Calcutta.

Röer was born in Braunschweig in a merchant family and studied philosophy and medicine at Königsberg and Jena. He studied philosophy under Johann Friedrich Herbart and wrote a dissertation De Spinosae systematis principiis quaestio metaphysica, 1832, but was not satisfied with Herbart's ideas. He became a postdoctorate of philosophy at Berlin in 1833. He studied Sanskrit with Franz Bopp and became interested in Indian philosophy. He then joined the East India Company and worked in schools in Bengal. He studied the works of H. T. Colebrooke and Ballantyne and became a librarian for the Asiatic Society of Bengal in 1841. He headed the linguistic department of the Asiatic Society from 1847 and wrote on a range of works, translating several Sanskrit works into Latin. From 1847 he was an editor of the Bibliotheca Indica.

Röer returned to Braunschweig due to poor health in 1861.
