= Yoga Yajnavalkya =

Book by Yajnavalkya

The Yoga Yajnavalkya (Sanskrit: योगयाज्ञवल्क्य, Yoga-Yājñavalkya) is a classical Hindu yoga text in the Sanskrit language. The text is written in the form of a male–female dialogue between the sages Yajnavalkya and Gargi. The text consists of 12 chapters and contains 504 verses.

Of all works consisting of sacrifices, or rituals, or control of conduct, or harmlessness, or liberality, or the study of the Vedas; this alone is the highest Dharma (duty) that one should see the Self by yoga.

— Yoga Yajnavalkya

Like Patanjali's Yogasutras, the Yoga Yajnavalkya describes the eight components of yoga; however, it has different goals. The text contains additional material that is not found in Yogasutras, such as the concept of kundalini. The Yoga Yajnavalkya contains one of the most comprehensive discussion of yoga components such as the Pranayama, Pratyahara, Dhyana, and Dharana.

The text was influential in the development and practice of the yoga traditions of India before the 12th century.

== Author ==
The text is traditionally attributed to Yajnavalkya, a revered Vedic sage in Hinduism. He is estimated to have lived in around the 8th century BCE, and is associated with several other major ancient texts in Sanskrit, namely the Shukla Yajurveda, the Shatapatha Brahmana, the Brihadaranyaka Upanishad, the Dharmasastra named Yājñavalkya Smṛti, Vriddha Yajnavalkya, and Brihad Yajnavalkya. He is also mentioned in the Mahabharata and the Puranas, as well as in ancient Jainism texts such as the Isibhasiyaim. These references to Yajnavalkya in other texts, in addition to the eponymous Yoga Yajnavalkya, may be to different sages with the same name.

The actual author of Yoga Yajnavalkya text was probably someone who lived many centuries after the Vedic sage Yajnavalkya, and is unknown. Ian Whicher, a professor of Religion at the University of Manitoba, writes that the author of Yoga Yajnavalkya may be an ancient Yajnavalkya, but this Yajnavalkya is not to be confused with the Vedic-era Yajnavalkya "who is revered in Hinduism for Brihadaranyaka Upanishad".

David White, a professor of Comparative Religion at the University of California, suggests that the author – a 9th- to 12th-century South Indian with the name of Yajnavalkya – was "the author of two works that combined the eight part practice with teachings on Hatha Yoga and Vedanta Philosophy": the Yoga Yajnavalkya and the Yogi Yajnavalkya-smriti. This issue has since been clarified in a 2017 study of the two works.

According to Dominik Wujastyk – a scholar of Sanskrit literature, Indology and the history of Yoga philosophy and practice, the Yoga Yajnavalkya is an early text on yoga. Many versions of its manuscripts have been discovered, with two pre-10th-century CE palm leaf manuscripts in Sanskrit, while many more versions have been found in other regional languages of the Indian subcontinent. The original text is likely many centuries older. The variations between the manuscripts suggest that this text was compiled and revised by multiple authors.

== Chronology ==
संयोगो योग इत्युक्तो जीवात्मपरमात्मनोः॥

Yoga is the union of the individual self (jivātma) with the supreme self (paramātma, brahman).

— Yoga Yajnavalkya 1.43

The composition date of Yoga Yajnavalkya is unclear. Prahlad Divanji, an Indologist and Sanskrit scholar, states that the text was composed between the second century BCE and fourth century CE, because Yoga Upanishads and Hatha Yoga texts contain verses from Yoga Yajnavalkya. Divanji cites Tantra texts, Ayurveda tradition texts, and literature of Advaita Vedanta from the 4th century CE, which mention the Yoga Yajnavalkya, thereafter concluding that the text or some version of the Yoga Yajnavalkya text must have been in existence by the 4th century CE. However, adds Divanji, the text is likely to have been composed after Patanjali's Yogasutra, which itself is variously estimated to have composed sometime between 500 BCE and 400 CE. Divanji premises his dating proposal from the observation that Yoga Yajnavalkya expands on ideas in Patanjali's text, such as its list of Yamas, which includes the Patanjali's five plus five additional ones.

A. G. Mohan, an author and yoga teacher, states that the text was likely completed before the 4th century CE. David White, in contrast, suggests the date of composition to be much later, between the 10th and 12th centuries. White states that the 13th-century Dattatreya Yoga-shastra acknowledges Yajnavalkya, and describes its teachings as "supplementary to the eight part practice as taught by Yajnavalkya", which means that the text was already established and accepted by then. Other manuscripts with devotional, "non-mental" and "mental" yoga texts in the Hindu tradition also refer to teachings of the text, suggesting the text originated before many other yoga texts.

Ram Shankar Bhattacharya, an Indologist, dates the Pune version of a manuscript of the text to about the 13th or 14th century CE, and notes that this version of the Yoga Yajnavalkya quotes verses from Hatha Yoga texts. He also points out that Gargi is mentioned as the wife of Yajnavalkya in the manuscript. However, no other text affirms that Gargi was the wife of Yajnavalkya; rather, Maitreyi and Katyayani are listed as his two wives, leading to the theory that the Pune manuscript is a corrupted and more modern edition of the original text.

According to Dominik Wujastyk, two of its manuscripts – MS Kathmandu NAK 5-696 (now preserved in Nepal), MS London BL Or. 3568 (preserved in the British Library)– are amongst the oldest surviving Sanskrit manuscripts found on the Indian subcontinent. The first is dated to the early 10th-century or late 9th-century, while the one discovered in Nepal is dated to 1024 CE from its colophon. The original text is likely much older than these palm leaf manuscript copies.

== Manuscripts ==
Several versions of the Yoga Yajnavalkya manuscripts are known. The earliest published manuscript of Yoga Yajnavalkya was discovered in Bengal in 1893. Since then, other manuscripts have been discovered with differing numbers of verses. The text published by Divanji in 1954, for example, has over 500 verses, while the manuscript translated by Krishnamacharya and Desikachar, writers and teachers of yoga books, has 460 verses.

A study of the manuscripts reveals that there are two quite different works that are often both called "Yogayājñavalkya." The work discussed in this Wikipedia page is often called the Yogayājñavalkyagītā in the manuscripts. A much older, and quite different work that does not discuss yoga postures, is called the Yogiyājñavalkyasmṛti or the Sārasamuccaya of the Yogayājñavalkya in manuscripts.

== Structure ==
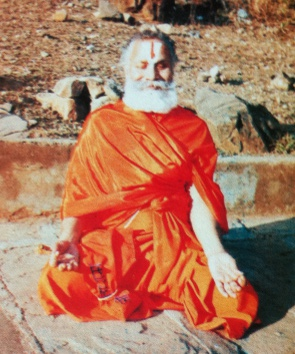
Yoga Yajnavalkya defines and describes meditation as an essential part of yoga.

The Yoga Yajnavalkya (or Yogayajnavalkya) text is structured as a conversation between a man (Yajnavalkya) and a woman (Gargi), in the presence of an audience. It is organized into twelve chapters, and cumulatively contains 504 verses.

The text opens with a discussion of virtues and lifestyle of a yogi, with 70 verses in the first chapter dedicated primarily to Yamas and 19 in second dedicated to Niyamas. The yoga postures with breathing and cleansing exercises are described in 149 verses of the third through seventh chapters, wherein the text asserts that these yoga exercises help the yogi master his senses and achieve awareness of his body.

Meditation discussions start in the eighth chapter of the text, where 40 verses discuss how to start and develop meditative practices with the help of Om and resonating sounds, followed by 44 verses in the ninth chapter for advanced meditation that is reflective on one's mind, Vedana (feelings) and nature of one's Atman (self, soul). The text dedicates 23 verses in the tenth chapter on samadhi (concentration) to become aware of the equality of one's Atman and Brahman (Universal Ultimate Reality, God).

The final sections of the text discuss the need for a Guru (teacher) along with the duties of a yogin, and what to do when one realizes one has made a mistake. The last chapter briefly discusses the kundalini, the benefits of yoga and the nature of calmness, contentedness in one's mind and consciousness.

== Contents ==
The text opens with reverence and introduction for Yajnavalkya and Gargi, and then gives its purpose: "to disclose the nature of yoga". In verses 10 to 19, Gargi remarks that yoga has been called the best karma, and asks Yajnavalkya to explain yoga to her. Yajnavalkya agrees, but first attributes his knowledge to the Hindu god Brahma who taught him this jnana (knowledge) and karma (works).

=== Knowledge ===
Yajnavalkya states that there are two paths to attain knowledge. One path is Pravritti-karma, wherein a person is driven by desire and a craving for rewards, forms his will, and then uses his knowledge to act out his free will. The second path is Nivritti-karma, wherein a person is not driven by desire and does not crave for rewards, but he uses his knowledge in his works in a detached way. The Pravritti-karma path is the cause for suffering and rebirth, while the Nivritti-karma is liberating and practiced by those who want to end suffering and rebirth.

The essence of knowledge is yoga, which has eight Anga (parts, accessories).

— Yoga Yajnavalkya 1.44–1.47

Verses 1.27–40 are a non-yoga commentary on the duties of four social classes – this section is missing in manuscripts of Yoga Yajnavalkya that contain 460 verses. The commentary presents two theories on the duties of the four classes in terms of ashrama dharmas of student, householder, hermit and mendicant..

According to Bhattacharya's translation it adds that all four varnas are required to "pay off the debts owed to the sages, men and gods" by practicing Brahmacharya, procreating offspring and performing karma. All four social classes should strive for Nivritti-karma (work without craving for rewards). According to Desikachar's translation, yoga is open to all, without restrictions to varna or gender.

Verses 1.41–49 state that "karma with knowledge is the means to liberation". Yoga is the essence of this knowledge, and it has eight components: Yama, Niyama, Asana, Pranayama, Pratyahara, Dharana, Dhyana and Samadhi.

=== Yamas: virtuous restraints of a yoga student ===
To never cause suffering to other beings by thought, word or deed. That is non-harmfulness.
To always say what is, and by that create good for all living beings: that is the practice of truthfulness.
Relinquishing the desire for the possessions of others, in deed, word and thought: that is non-covetousness – thus say the sages who have realized the ultimate truth.

– Yoga Yajnavalkya 1.52–1.54,

The Yoga Yajnavalkya starts its description of yoga practice with a statement of virtuous self-restraints that a yogi or yogini needs to adhere to. This list is longer than the five yamas listed by Patañjali in Yogasūtra, (Note: Four of five yamas listed by Patañjali in Yogasūtra are found in the list of ten yamas in Yoga Yajnavalkya. The common four are: Ahimsa (nonviolence), Satya (truthfulness), Asteya (never take other people's property) and Brahmacharya (chastity, fidelity). The one not common to both the texts is Aparigraha (non-possessiveness).) but similar to those found in other Hindu texts such as the Shandilya Upanishad and other ancient and medieval-era Yoga texts. Verses 1.50–51 of Yoga Yajnavalkya list the following ten Yamas (the restraints), while verses 1.52–70 explain what these virtues mean and why they are necessary:

1. Ahiṃsā (अहिंसा): nonviolence, nonharmfulness by action, with word or in thought
2. Satya (सत्य): truthfulness
3. Asteya (अस्तेय): not stealing
4. Brahmacharya (ब्रह्मचर्य): celibacy, fidelity to one's partner
5. Dayā (दया): kindness, compassion
6. Ārjava (आर्जव): no hypocrisy, sincerity
7. Kṣamā (क्षमा): forgiveness
8. Dhṛti (धृति): fortitude
9. Mitāhāra (मितहार): moderation in diet
10. Śauca (शौच): purity, cleanliness

Verse 1.69 asserts that in a cleansed body resides a peaceful mind, and when this mind achieves purity, Atmavidya (knowledge of soul) becomes feasible.

=== Niyamas: virtuous observances of a yoga student ===
Chapter 2 begins with a list of ten Niyamas (the Observances), followed by an explanation of each in the rest of the chapter. The list is longer than the list of five found in Patanjali's Yogasutras, (Note: All five Niyamas listed by Patañjali in Yogasūtra are found in Yoga Yajnavalkya, but with Sauca listed in the Yamas list of the latter. The common four Niyamas are: Tapas, Santosha, Īśvarapraṇidhāna, and Svādhyāya (restated as Siddhānta śrāvaṇa in Yoga Yajnavalkya).) but similar to those found in the Shandilya and Varaha Upanishads, the Hatha Yoga Pradipika, and verses 552 to 557 in Book 3 of the Tirumandhiram of Tirumular, in the sense of positive duties, desirable behaviors and discipline. The list of the ten niyamas are:

1. Tapas: austerity, persistence and perseverance in one's purpose
2. Santoṣa: contentment, acceptance of others and of one's circumstances as they are, optimism for self
3. Āstika: faith in merit and demerit
4. Dāna: generosity, charity, sharing with others
5. Īśvarapūjana: worship of the Ishvara (Brahman, Vishnu, Rudra, God/Supreme Being, True Self)
6. Siddhānta śrāvaṇa: listening to the Vedas and Upanishads, texts about virtues and principles
7. Hrī: shyness, modesty, remorse and acceptance of one's past, humility
8. Mati: faith in self and duties, reflection to reconcile conflicting ideas
9. Japa: steady reading of the Vedas, repetition of mantras or sacred sounds set in poetic meters, either with sound or silently in one's mind
10. Vratam: vows and self-promise to focus and achieve appropriate self set goals on Dharma, Artha, Kama and Moksha.

Richard Rosen, yoga teacher and a contributing editor at Yoga Journal, states that the first two chapters provide the moral foundations of its yoga teachings, and are more detailed than many other yoga texts in the Indian traditions.

=== Asanas: the yoga postures ===
Chapter 3 opens with a list of eight asanas (postures), followed by the description of each one. The asanas are of two types: one set is for meditative contemplation, and the other for cleansing the body. Both are said to be important in the journey of yoga. Different asanas focus on different organ groups. Of the eight asanas, the text discusses two variations each for the Swastikasana and the Mukta Sirsasana in verses 3.3–5 and 3.13–14 respectively, with claims that each asana helps cleanse the body when these are practiced with Yamas and Niyamas.

Cleansing asanas are those that when practiced for short periods of time help the body prevent or correct internal imbalances and tone inner organs; while meditative asanas are those postures, either sitting or standing, that one can maintain steadily and comfortably for extended periods of time. In both, a proper posture is achieved when one can combine relaxed steadiness with deep breathing exercises. Such comfortable and stable asanas are necessary for cleansing of the Nadi (Astral Tubes which are around seventy two thousand running throughout the human body) through the Pranayama stage of yoga. This view is shared by other yoga texts, such as in verse 5.2 of Gheranda Samhita. The Padmasana (lotus position) is esteemed for both cleansing and meditative contemplation.

=== A theory of human body and inner fire ===
Gargi inquires in chapter 4 about the nature of Nadis, the human body and how vital airs function in it. Yajnavalkya begins his reply by asserting that the height of every adult human being is about 96 times the width of his or her Angula (thumb).

The Prana (breath, vital air) of the body is dispersed within and outside the body. The first aim of yoga is to become aware and control this vital air, to be equal to or lower than the inner fire within one's body. This inner fire resides in the middle part of the body, and he calls it the Nabhi (center) and a Chakra. This is the residence of the Jiva, and the vital air nourishes it from below while one is alive. Just above this Nabhi is the kundalini which normally is dormant. Yoga awakens her, by bringing vital air and heat to her.

Verses 4.26–35 state that the human body has fourteen nadis (Astral Tubes which are around seventy two thousand running throughout the human body), of which three are primary. Sushumna (Sanskrit: सुषुम्णा) is the most important, as it extends all along the spinal cord and reaches into the head, sustaining the whole body. Vishnu is the deity whose power propels Sushumna according to verse 4.31. On both sides of the Sushumna reside the Ida and Pingala vessels, the former connected to the moon and the latter to the sun. These three drive the three Guṇas (forces behind the innate character) of a being, with Sushumna driving Sattva (goodness), Pingala driving the Rajas (action), and Ida driving the Tamas (destructiveness). These primary vessels are connected to numerous channels inside the human body, which pervade the whole body, and nourish it.

When one inhales or exhales, according to verses 4.47–65, the Nadis are loaded with vital airs. There are ten types of vital airs, corresponding to different stages of breathing, and they are named Prana, Apana, Samana, Udana, Vyana, Naga, Kurma, Krikara, Devadatta and Dhananjaya. These affect the Nadis in different ways, and how the body functions and what the balance of organs within the body is, depends on food one takes in and how well inhalation and exhalation are able to deliver the vital airs to various body parts.

The body interacts with nature, and removes liquids and excretes waste through nine holes. The aim of pranayama (breath control) is to purify the channels and nourish the inner body with vital airs. This benefits a yogi and yogini in preventing and curing diseases, as well as preparing the mind for meditation.

=== Breath control and meditation for self-purification ===
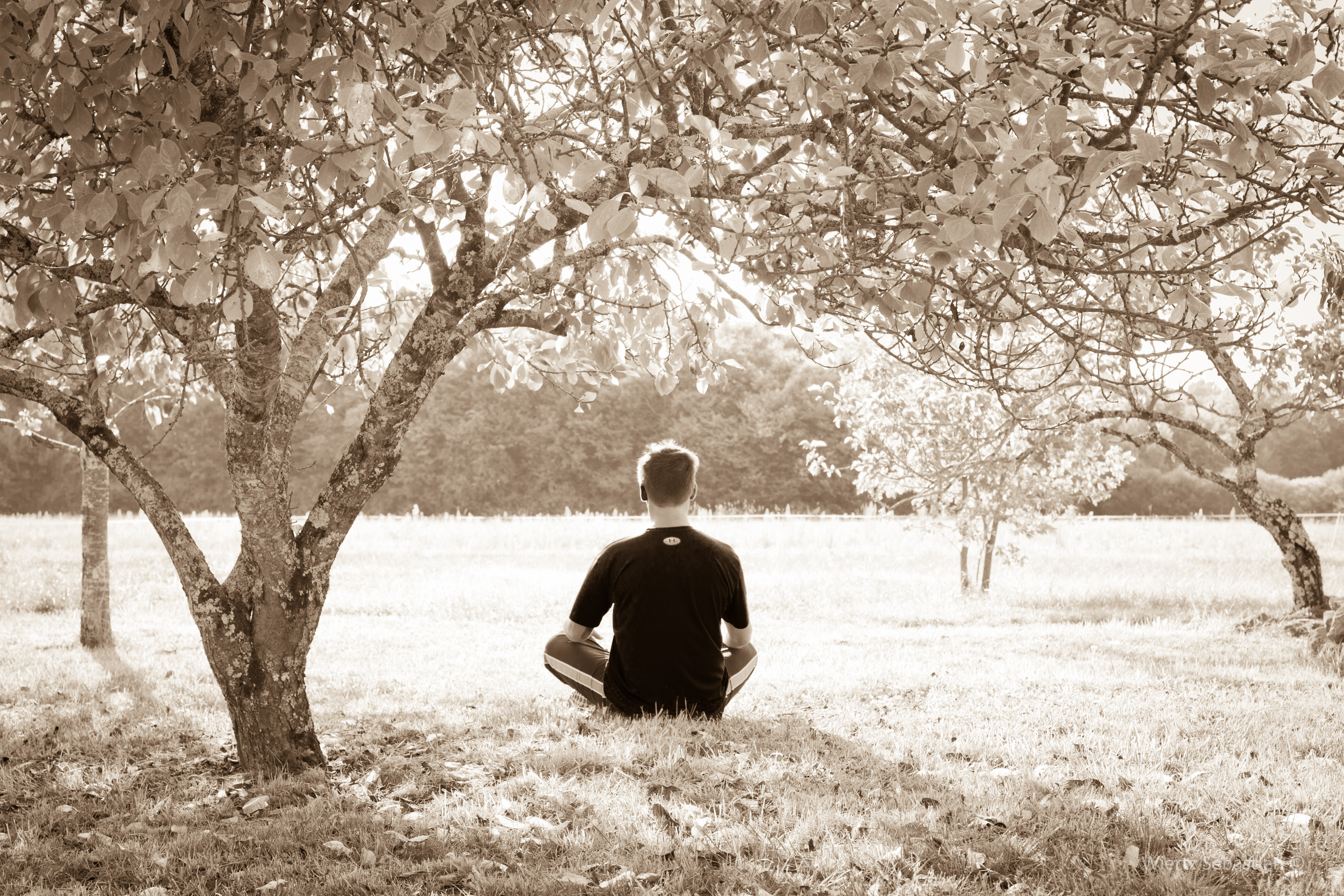
Solitary and quiet locations are recommended for Yoga by the text in chapter 5.

Chapters 5 and 6 discuss the means of cleansing the body and mind. The first ten verses of chapter 5 summarize and restate the need for always practicing virtuous self-restraints (Yamas), observances (Niyamas), avoiding anger against anyone or anything, truthfully following Dharma, respecting and learning from the Guru (teacher), and pursuing the proper goals of life without craving for rewards of one's action. (Note: Verses 5.7–10 state the yogi should live a life of action in order to pursue proper goals of life (dharma, artha, kama, moksha) with a sense of detachment and not crave for phala (fruits, that is rewards) of one's action. This theme mirrors the nishkama karma found in other Hindu texts such as the Bhagavad Gita, where a life of action is seen as either driven by attachment and craving for rewards without consideration of dharma, or one driven by what is right and ethical (dharma) without craving for rewards; the traditional texts suggest pursuing the latter – also called nishkama karma, that is one driven by what is right without craving for rewards.)

==== Location for yoga ====
Solitary places are the best venues for yoga. A matha (hut) in a forest is ideal, but any private place that is free from distractions, high winds or intense sunshine is a good location for yoga. Either a pad made of kusha grass or a solid ground with deer skin mat on it, is desirable. Yoga can be learned, with the help of a teacher, within three to four months if practiced six times a day. If frequent practice is not possible, yoga can be mastered over a period of three to four years.

==== Mastering the breath ====
The text dedicates the largest number of verses to the discussion of breath and breath exercises.

The essential nature of breath control is the union of Prana and Apana.

— Yoga Yajnavalkya 6.1

Yajnavalkya dedicates significant amount of text to explain the art of mastering each stage of breathing, that is inhalation, exhalation and stoppage between the two. Each stage is discussed in terms of its nature, speed, duration, depth on its own and relative to the other stage of breathing, regulating these at will during asanas meant for cleansing body or mind. In order to keep time for each stage without distraction, he recommends silently reciting time-measured mantras or sound beats to help measure each stage and thus establish progress during the yoga. The mantras for internal time measurement mentioned include Pranava (Om), Gayatri with Vyahritis, or Gayatri with Siras. (Note: The seven Vyahritis used as prefixes to Gayatri are Bhu, Bhuva, Svah, Maha, Janah, Tapah and Satyam; while Siras are suffixes to Gayatri consisting of apo, jyoti, rasa, amritam, Brahma, Bhu, Bhuva and Sva. The mantra combines the Vyahritis and Siras with Om.)

The text classifies three levels of breath regulation, namely Puraka (पूरक, satisfying), Kumbhaka (कुम्भक, prominent) and Rechaka (रेचक, purging). The Puraka exercise is shortest and counts twelve moments (matras, music beats); the Kumbhaka is medium and stretches over twenty-four moments, while the Rechaka is highest lasting thirty-six moments. The text then describes various combinations of Puraka, Kumbhaka and Rechaka in various asanas for the purposes of energizing the Nadis and cleansing the body, asserting that, when mastered, Prana, Apana, Samana, Udana, Vyana and other vital airs help gain endurance, calmness, measured speed, ascension and inner healing. The text says that Pranayama exercises have therapeutic powers. Yajnavalkya describes Sanmukhi mudra, Kevaka kumbhaka and Sahita kumbhaka in chapter 6, asserting that the best exercises are those that make one feel lightness in the body and relaxation in the mind.

=== Meditation ===
Chapter 7 discusses the fifth limb of yoga, Pratyahara, which it says is of five forms. This stage is one where the focus of the mind shifts from external stimuli received by sensory organs to various levels of internal awareness. The theory of Marma (joints) is presented, and 18 vital points inside one's body are listed that can be used as focal points to help initial stages of the meditative exercises.

Verses 1–10 of chapter 8 elaborate on the practice of Dharana or meditation to train the mind in the consciousness of the self. The five elements in the universe correspond to five body functional systems, and that systems are gods residing within the human body. The next level of meditation is to fix one's undistracted attention to these five, while simultaneously performing the breath exercises mastered in the previous step.

The five deities are addressed by chanting the five letters or syllables (Bijamantra which are the sounds of the Chakras) which are laṃ (लं), vaṃ (वं), raṃ (रं), yaṃ (यं), and haṃ (हं) to become one with Parameshvara (God). Verses 8.11–15 state that a yogin should practice meditating on these respective body systems as deities, with the help of Om mantra, as this leads to dissolution, and realization of the Brahman-Purusha. After mastery is achieved with the aid of envisioning the five deities within one's body, the text mentions that the yogin overcomes three Dosha (दोष, faults). The chapter ends by reminding the yoga student to not forget the daily duties and works, the virtuous self-restraints (yamas) and virtuous observances (niyamas) as he gains mastery to this level of yoga.

Chapter 9 discusses Dhyana limb of yoga. Dhyana can lead to freedom or bondage, depending on how and what one concentrates on. Freedom comes from realizing the oneness of individual self with the universal self. The Nirguna (non-qualified, attribute less) form of meditation is best suited for those who have mastered the vital airs as well as all the Asanas with inner awareness of Marmans (vital points) and Nadis (blood vessels). These yogins and yoginis can abstract, feel the Self within, and should meditate on "I am Brahman, who is all pervasive, all embracing, all perceiving and full of bliss".

Reflective meditation is the direct feeling (Vedana) of one's own self through the mind. It is either qualified (Saguna) or non-qualified (Nirguna). Qualified meditation are five, of which three are the best. Non-qualified is of one kind only.

— Yoga Yajnavalkya 9.1–3

The Saguna meditation, that is qualified and with attributes, is for those who need a concrete symbol such as a Murti, or a visualization aid. They should think of the identity of their lotus heart having eight petals with the highest self visualized as Vasudeva, Narayana or Purushottama. The meditation should concentrate on one's own identity with this image of imperishable highest self. This is the path to the state of Vaishvanara, or qualified Dhyana.

The text suggests variations to the Saguna meditation, such as perceiving the union of a golden disc with four-faced golden Purusha, imagining a lustrous inner self inside oneself and then oneness with it, and other variations. Verses 9.43–44 state that the inner self, whether meditated upon as Nirguna or Saguna, is one and the same.

=== Concentration ===
Concentration (Samadhi) is the state of equality of both the individual self and the highest self. It may also be defined as the abiding of the inner self in Brahman. [...] In concentration the individual self and the supreme self become one.

— Yoga Yajnavalkya 10.1–5

Chapter 10 states meditation practice perfects one's ability to concentrate, wherein the object one concentrates on becomes the one of attachment, of oneness and one feels one's identity with it. Verses 10.6–15 suggest that one must concentrate on self as the supreme self, oneness with Brahman in everything, and this process of attachment of one's individual self to the supreme self leads to oneness and liberation.

Verses 10.19–23 advise that those who seek liberation in life or after death, should do yoga and reach the stage of Samadhi wherein one fixes one's mind on the supreme self. This is recommended for those in their advanced years and seekers of inner liberation and peace. Yajnavalkya suggests to Gargi that she should meditate on the self in her through yoga, and thus attain nirvana.

=== Dharma of a yogin, Astanga yoga ===
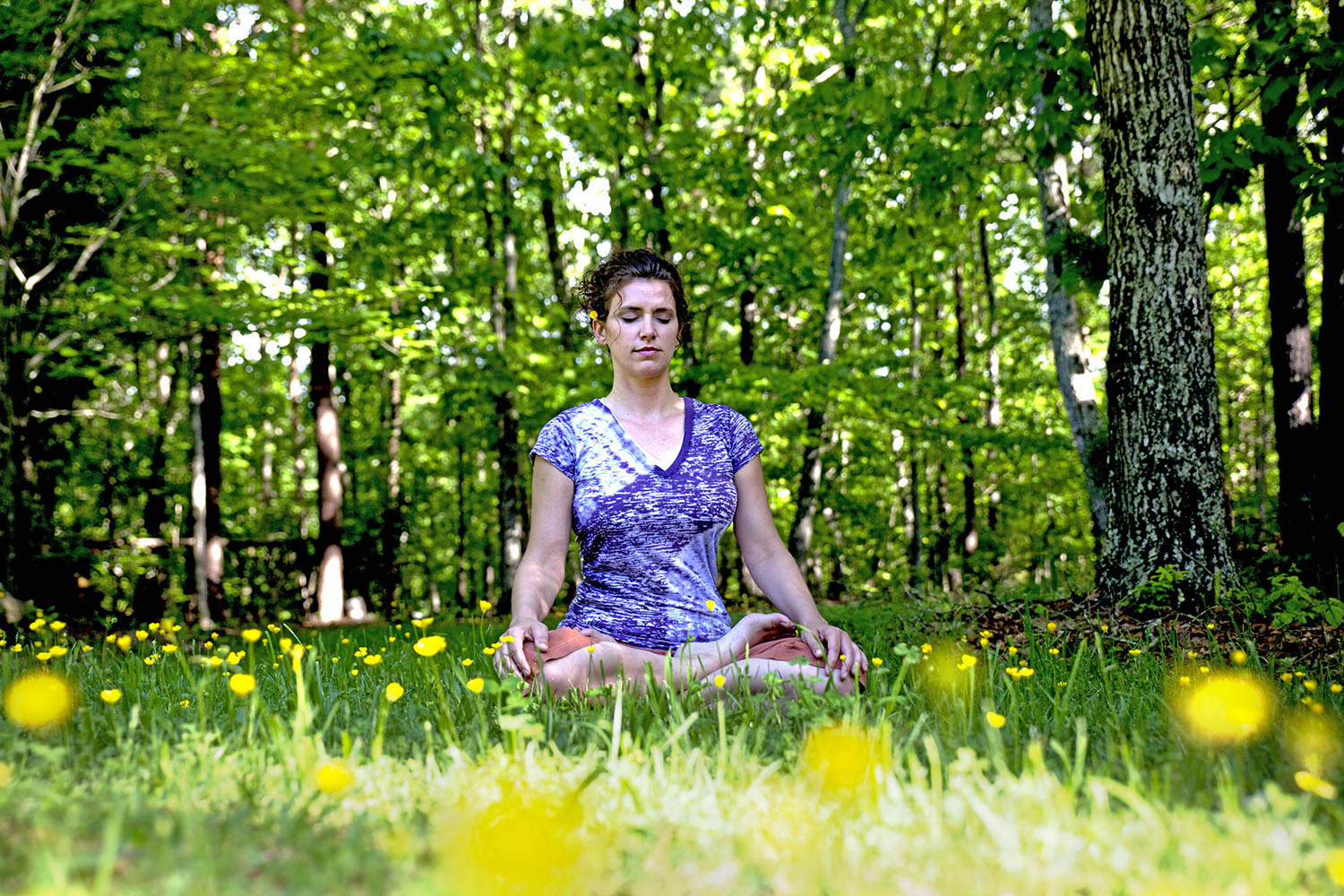
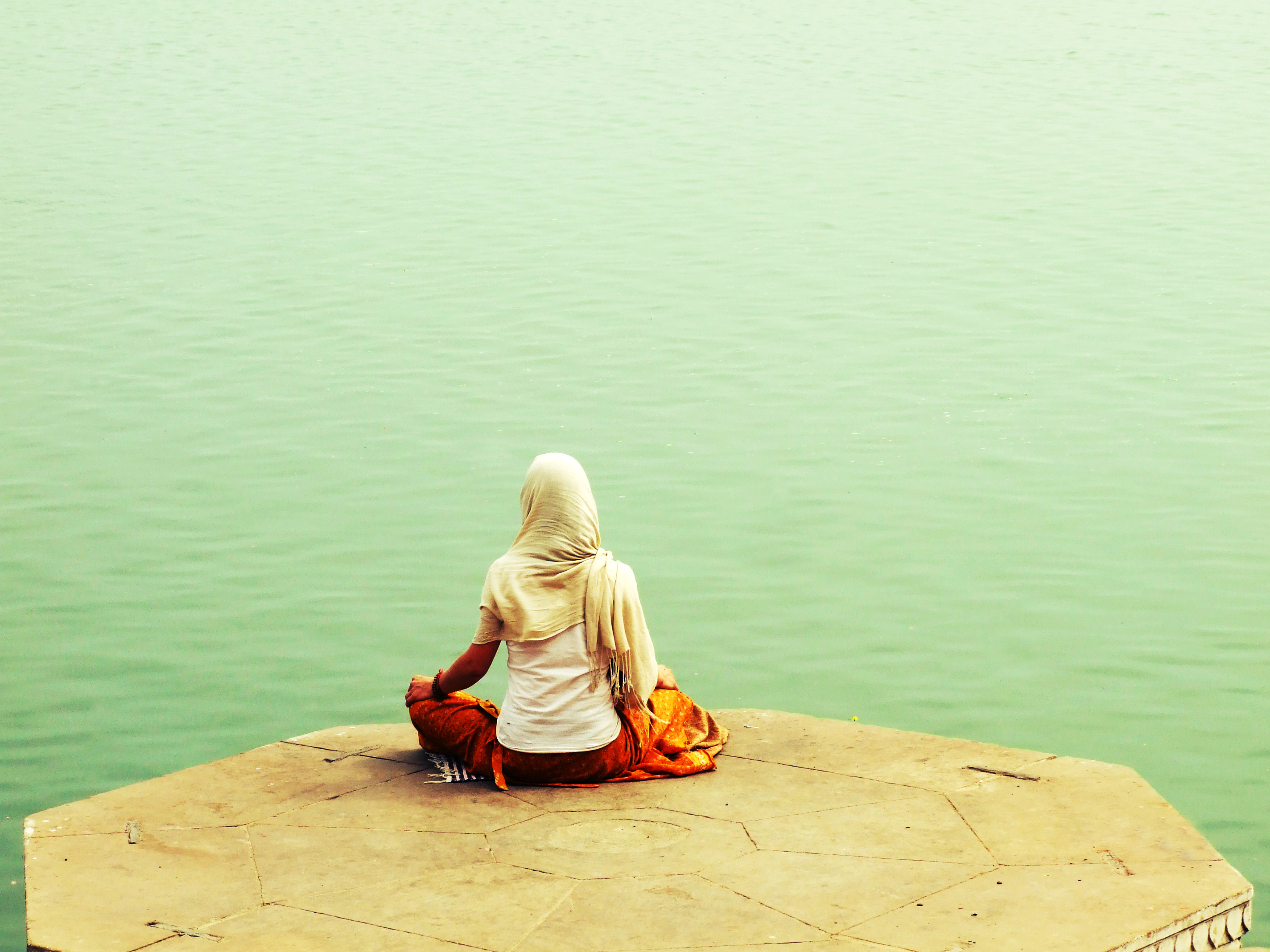
Chapter 12 of the text summarizes yoga and meditation, and adds an explanation of kundalini.

Gargi, in chapter 11 asks Yajnavalkya whether a yogin in the state of Samadhi needs to perform Vedic duties. He replies, "No, any one in the state of yoga need not do Vedic duties", because that state is the goal. However, anyone who leaves the state of Samadhi must perform Dharmic duties because "no living being can survive without performing any actions". All duties should be performed until the end of one's life, when the self unites with the supreme self. Gargi then asks Yagnavalkya to summarize the astanga - the eight components of yoga.

=== The theory of kundalini ===
In the first 47 verses of chapter 12, Yajnavalkya elucidates Siddha yoga and Kundalini. The aim of these yogic exercises, according to verses 12.1–4, is to reach the "internal fire" with Prana (life force, breath energy); these should be performed three times daily for ten days. With the vital air under control through the yoga, the yogin realizes signs of progress such as a relaxed state of body, manifested divine sound or nada inside. Verses 12.10–14 state that this Kundalini fire is situated in the navel, and should be meditated upon by breathing exercises. This warms up the Kundalini, awakening her, and the warmth glows through the entire body, and at this stage the yogin must draw the breath above the navel.

In the citadel of Brahman (heart), there resides the individual self (Atman) who is nothing but Brahman deluded.

— Yoga Yajnavalkya 12.22

The Yoga Yagnavalkya explains that warm air inhaled passes to the Brahmarandhra via the navel which helps in curing diseases. When hot air is retained in the heart it is the stage when it makes entry into the Sahasrara Chakra, the thousand petaled lotus, that then emerges in an inverted form. When the vital air is held in the abode of Brahman (Atman), which is the heart, according to verses 12.15–22, the fire located in the region of Susumna, which is between the eyebrows glows. These exercises, which stimulates the heart with vital air and fire, lead to the perception of light internally and externally. At this stage one should behold with the mind's eye, the fire-like glowing moon in the forehead, and meditate on the inner self in the Chitta (mind).

One distinctive feature of the Yoga Yajnavalkya is that kuṇḍalinī is mostly described as a blockage that prevents prāṇa from entering the suṣumnā and rising. This was the main textual basis of the teachings on kuṇḍalinī by T. Krishnamacharya, who is often called 'the father of modern yoga'.

Verses 12.23–31 state that the lingasharira, which is the subtle body that is not visible, glistens in the central region of the body or the heart or the forehead. This shining Shakti (force, energy, power), translates Bhattacharya, is realised by the knower of Brahman through his concentrated vision. Atman is perceived when the mind located in the space between the eyebrows, becomes free of all distractions and activities. In this state, the yogin becomes aware of self within, and in the sages, in siddhas and others. If dissolution of the mind in the space between the eye brows does not occur, the yogin should envision absolute bliss, alternatively the full moon inside the mouth. This helps the mind dissolve away distractions and activity, helping it reside in Vishnupada or the Akasha (sky), and brings the yogin closer to moksha or liberation. This is a stage where the feeling of liberation and bliss begins to emerge, the goal of the practice of yoga.

Brahman is the origin of all, it is all that exists and all that into which it will dissolve back, and the Vedas teach that this Brahman resides in the heart of a person. It is, translates Bhattacharya, "subtler than the subtle, greater than the great" and is perceived with the cleansing of one's mind and intellect, one achievable with breathing exercises, sacred sound exercises and yoga.

=== Epilogue ===
Following the complete exposition of all the principles of yoga, Yagnavalkya leaves for a secluded place to continue his meditative contemplation, while Gargi forsakes her world, retires to a forest hermitage, and seeks refuge in the practice of yoga.

== Translations ==
Two English translations of the complete text are known, one by Desikachar and the other by Mohan, while Bhattacharya has published a condensed summary of the twelve chapters.

According to Desikachar's translation: "In the 1960s only two [Sanskrit] versions of this valuable text were available [Bombay Branch of the Royal Asiatic Society (BBRAS) and Trivandrum editions], and both were incomplete or inaccurate. He [Krishnamacharya] took the pains of writing the whole manuscript." Desikachar further states in his introduction: "However many verses of this twelve-chapter text are missing in both versions... He [Krishnamacharya] even corrected those manuscripts that were incomplete." In The Heart of Yoga, Desikachar indicates: "There is one critical edition of the Yoga Yājñavalkya written by Śrī Prabhad [sic] C. Divanji [BBRAS edition]."

According to A. G. Mohan's English translation: "However, a comparative reading shows that the Desikachar edition is a faithful reproduction of the 1938 Trivandrum publication. The only edits made are to fill in a negligible number of missing words – around 60 words out of 6000 – in mostly obvious contexts. There are no significant corrections to existing verses. The Divanji publication is easily more complete and error free, containing copious footnotes comparing different versions of the text from sixteen manuscripts and five printed editions (including the Trivandrum publication)... The Trivandrum publication offered by the Desikachar misses 39 1/2 verses that appear in the Divanji publication."

== Significance ==
According to David White, Yoga Yajnavalkya was more significant in practice than the Patanjali's Yogasutras before the 12th century. Among the texts on asanas and meditation, it dominated the Indian yoga scene. Along with texts such as Yoga Vasistha, chapters embedded inside the Hindu epic the Mahabharata and literature related to traditions such as Hatha Yoga, Pashupata Yoga and Tantric Yoga, the Yoga Yajnavalkya was historically influential in Indian spiritual traditions.

Secondary Sanskrit language texts from the 9th to 12th centuries incorporate the ideas of Yoga Yajnavalkya into their own traditions. These include the bhasya (commentary) of Lakshmidhara and manuscripts of Vedanta schools such as Advaita Vedanta that discuss and incorporate yoga philosophy and practices as essential for their traditions.

The presence of Gargi in Yoga Yajnavalkya is significant in a historical sense, as encouraging yoga to women. According to Divanji, the text includes some yoga-related verses exclusively addressed to women, such as those in verses 1.21–40, 2.8–9 and 6.11–20.

The text was influential on many later yoga texts like the Hatha Yoga Pradipika, and Yoga Upanishads such as the Yoga-kundalini Upanishad and Yogatattva Upanishad, because they make frequent references to it.

=== Yoga Yajnavalkya versus Patanjali's Yogasutra ===
The philosophical premises of Yajnavalkya and Patanjali are different, according to Richard Rosen. Patanjali accepts the dualism premise, and defines yoga as cessation of mental activity associated with sensory interaction with nature, leading to Kaivalya (aloneness) of the self and a state of self-awareness. Yajnavalkya accepts the Advaita Vedanta premise of non-dualism, "essential oneness of self and nature", and defines yoga as path to intense interconnectedness between Jiva and Paramatman, where the union of self and supreme self is realized.

== See also ==
- Yoga (philosophy)
- Yoga Vasistha
- Yogatattva Upanishad
