= Shandilya Upanishad =

Sanskrit text, Yoga Upanishad

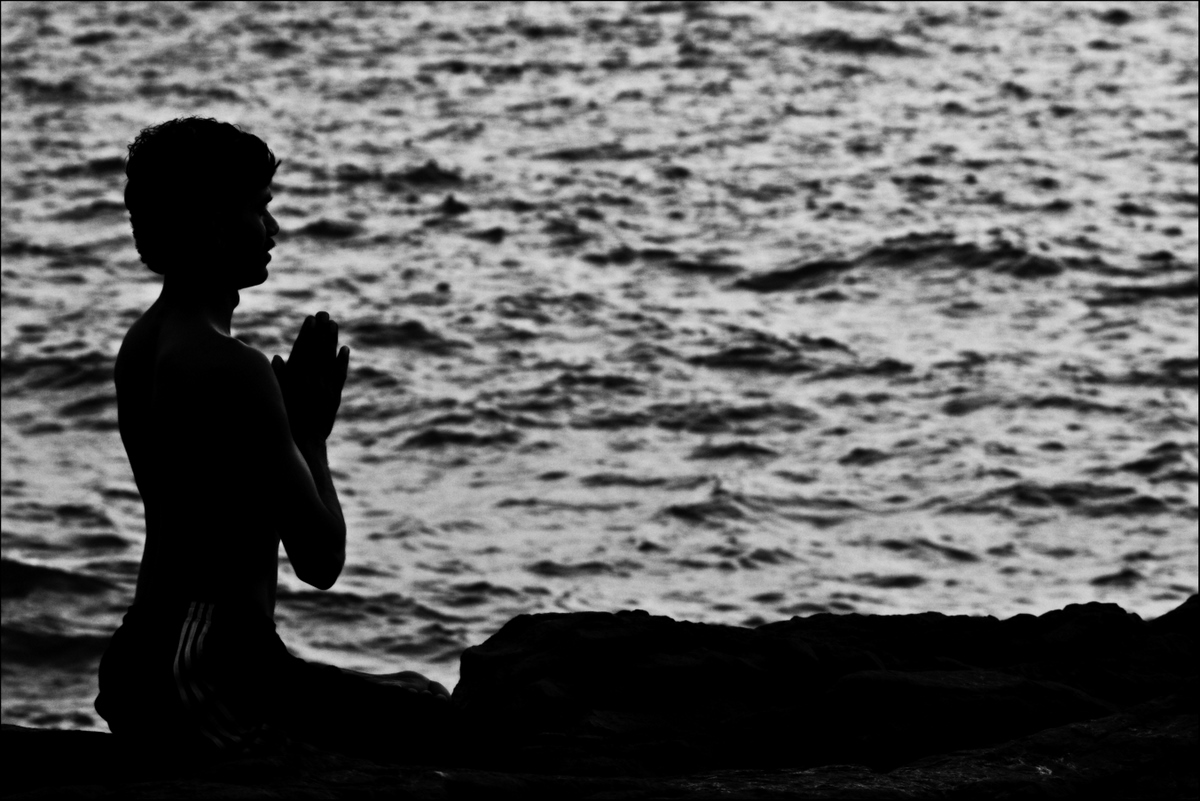
- Gomukhasana is one of eight postures described in Shandilya Upanishad
- Devanagari: शाण्डिल्य
- IAST: Śāṇḍilya
- Title means: Name of a Vedic sage, Sandilya
- Date: Vedic Age
- Type: Yoga
- Linked Veda: Atharvaveda
- Chapters: 3
- Philosophy: Yoga, Vedanta

The Shandilya Upanishad (Sanskrit: शाण्डिल्य उपनिषत्, IAST: Śāṇḍilya Upaniṣad) is a Sanskrit text and one of the minor Upanishads of Hinduism. It is one of twenty Yoga Upanishads in the four Vedas, and is attached to the Atharvaveda.

The text is primarily focussed on Yoga techniques, and is among the most detailed in the Upanishadic corpus of texts dedicated to Yoga. It describes ten Yamas (ethical don'ts, restraints), ten Niyamas (ethical to do list, observances) and eight Asanas (postures), along with three Pranayamas, five types of Pratyaharas, five kinds of Dharana, two types of Dhyana and one Samadhi.

== History ==
Gavin Flood dates the text to around 100 BCE to 300 CE. Roy Eugene Davis suggests Shandilya Upanishad probably pre-dates Patanjali's Yogasutras, while Georg Feuerstein suggests the text probably post-dates the Yogasutras. Thomas McEvilley states that the chronology of the text is uncertain, but it was probably composed around the time Dhyanabindu Upanishad and before Hatha Yoga Pradipka, Kaulajnananirnaya and Shiva Samhita.

Some historical manuscripts of this Upanishad are titled as Śāṇḍilyopaniṣad (शाण्डिल्योपनिषद्). It is listed at number 58 in the serial order of the Muktika enumerated by Rama to Hanuman in the modern era anthology of 108 Upanishads. It is also known as the Shandilya Yoga Sutras. According to Alain Daniélou this Upanishad is one of the three Upanishads in the genre of the Hatha yoga; the others are the Darshana Upanishad and the Yoga-kundalini Upanishad.

== Contents ==
Virtues of a Yogi

तत्राहिंसासत्यास्तेयब्रह्मचर्यदयाजप क्षमाधृतिमिताहारशौचानि चेति यमादश । तत्राहिंसा नाममनोवाक्कायकर्मभिः सर्वभूतेषु सर्वदा क्लेशजननम् । सत्यं नाममनोवाक्कायकर्मभिर्भूतहितयथार्थाभिभाषणम् । (...)

Under Yamas are ten: Ahimsa, Satya, Asteya, Brahmacharya, Dayā, Ārjava, Kṣamā, Dhṛti, Mitāhāra Śauca. Of these, Ahimsa is the not causing of any pain to any living being at any time through the actions of one's mind, speech or body. Satya is the speaking of truth that conduces to the well being of creatures, through the actions of one's mind, speech or body. (...)

—Shandilya Upanishad Chapter 1

The Shandilya Upanishad is structured as three chapters with many sections in each chapter. The first chapter of the text deals with Ashtanga Yoga. It contains eleven sections.

1. Yama
2. Niyama
3. Asana
4. Pranayama : Nadis, Vayus and Kundalini
5. Pranayama: Purification of Nadis
6. Pranayama with Pranava
7. Pranayama: Purification of Susumna and others
8. Pratyahara
9. Dharana
10. Dhyana
11. Samadhi

The other Chapters have a single section each.

The Second chapter is comparatively a smaller one and expounds the Brahma Vidya.

The Third Chapter talks about the nature and forms of Brahman: Sakala Brahman, Niskala Brahman and Sakala-Niskala Brahman.

Raman states that the first chapter is one of the most detailed Upanishadic treatises on various types of Yoga. The last two chapters integrate the Vedanta philosophy, particularly the "nondual Nirguna Brahman as the ultimate self" concept of Hinduism, and asserts that there is oneness of Atman in all living beings, that everything is Brahman.

=== Yoga practice ===
The Yoga techniques-related chapter 1, which is the largest part of this Upanishad, begins by asserting that to be an accomplished Yogin, one must possess self-restraint, introspectively delight in truth and in virtue towards self and towards others. A successful Yogin is one who has conquered anger and is proficient in Yoga theory and practice.

Yoga is best done in a peaceful pleasant place, states the Upanishad, such as near river banks or water bodies, temple, garden abounding with fruits, water falls, a place of silence or where Vedic hymns are being recited, frequented by fellow yoga practitioners and such, and there the Yogi should find a level place. After settling into his posture, he should do breath exercises to cleanse his body, then meditate, states the text.

The Upanishad elaborates on eight-fold or Ashtanga Yoga, without citing Patanjali. The Upanishad defines each Yamas and each Niyamas. For example, Ahimsa (virtue of non-violence) states the text is the Yamas of "not causing pain to any living being at any time either mentally, vocally, or physically".

Asanas in Shandilya Upanishad
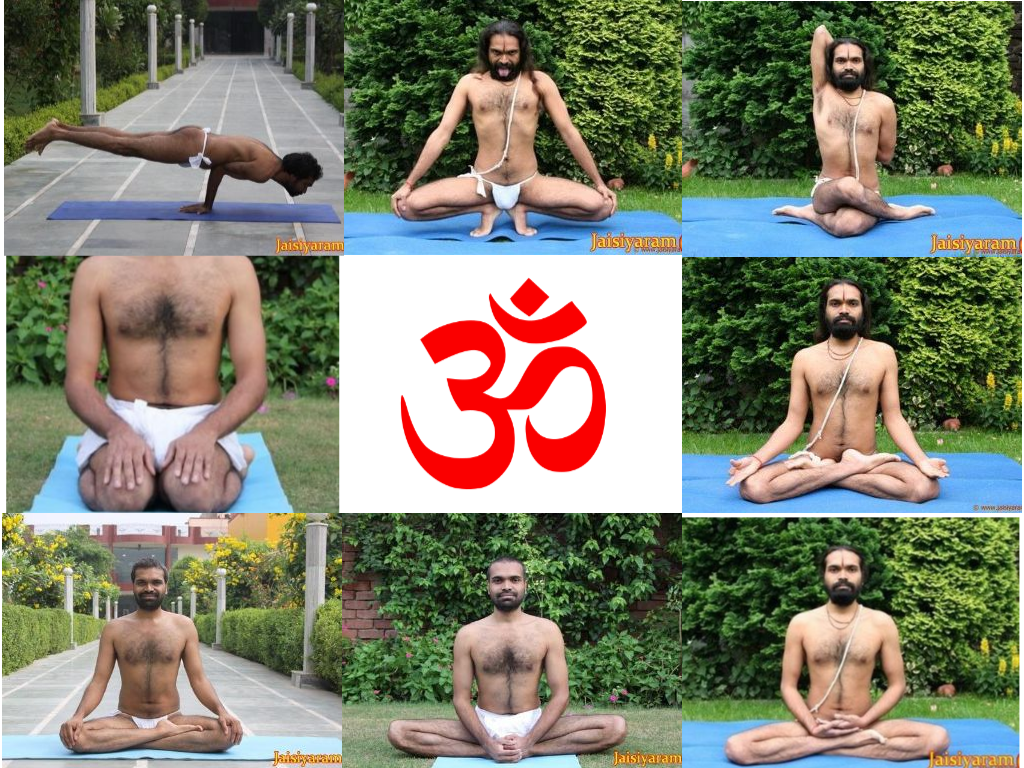
- Eight chief Asanas from Shandilya Upanishad - (clockwise from top left) : Mayura, Simha, Goumukha, Padma, Mukta/Siddha, Bhadra, Swastika, Vira .

Section 1.3 of the text describes eight Asanas, which includes Svastikasana, Gomukhasana, Padmasana, Virasana, Simhasana, Bhadrasana, Muktasana and Mayurasana. The Yogi who has mastered all the Yamas, the Niyamas and an Asana, states the Upanishad, should proceed to the Pranayama to help cleanse the inner body. The text is notable in repeatedly reminding the importance of ethical virtues in a Yogi, virtues such as truthfulness, non-anger, temperance, proper eating habits, proper conduct and others, as it transitions from one stage of Yoga to next. After reminding the ethical mandates, the Upanishad describes three types of Pranayama, namely Ujjayi, Sitkara and Sitala.

The text is one of the four Upanishads which includes a discussion of Kundalini chakras from Yoga perspective, the other three being Darshana Upanishad, the Yogachudamani Upanishad, and the Yogashikha Upanishad. However, the ideas in the four texts show an acceptance of a diversity of views; for example, this text asserts that Manipura Chakra has 12 petals instead of 10 in the other texts.

Section 1.8 of Shandilya presents five kinds of Pratyahara, namely the ability to withdraw sensory organs from the external world at will, the ability to view everything as the Atman (soul), the ability to give away fruits of one's effort, the ability to be unaffected by the presence of sensual pleasures, and finally the fifth Pratyahara being the ability to project one's attention to one of eighteen vital parts of one's own body. Section 1.9 of the Upanishad presents five kinds of Dharanas (concentration), section 1.10 presents two kinds of Dhyana (meditation), while section 1.11 describes Samadhi – its last stage of Yoga.

=== Vedanta ===
The ultimate goal of its teachings is the realization of the nature of one's Atman and its nonduality with Brahman (ultimate reality). This is the "Shandilya doctrine", named after the Vedic sage after whom this text is titled, and who is credited in section 3.14 of the Chandogya Upanishad with the oldest known statement of the Vedanta foundation. This doctrine, also repeated in the last two chapters of this text, is "the identity of Brahman with the Atman, of God with the soul", states Deussen.

The closing sections of the text declare the Aum, Atman, Brahman, Shiva and Dattatreya to be one and the same.

== See also ==
- Hatha yoga
- Yoga (philosophy)
- Yogatattva Upanishad
- Yoga Vasistha
