= Shaucha =

Cleanliness in Indic religions and yoga

Shaucha (Sanskrit: शौच, romanized: Śauca) literally means purity, cleanliness, and clearness. It refers to purity of mind, speech and body. Shaucha is one of the niyamas of Yoga. It is discussed in many ancient Indian texts such as the Mahabharata and Patanjali's Yoga Sutras. It is a virtue in Hinduism and Jainism. In Hinduism purity is a part of worship and an important quality for salvation. Purity is a mind pure and free of evil thoughts and behaviors.

Shaucha includes outer purity of body as well as inner purity of mind. It is synonymous with shuddhi (शुद्धि). LePage states that shaucha in yoga is on many levels, and deepens as an understanding and evolution of self increases.

In yogic practice, shaucha is considered essential for health, happiness, and general well-being. External purity is achieved through daily ablutions, while internal purity is cultivated through physical exercises, including asana (postures) and pranayama (breathing techniques). Along with daily ablutions to cleanse one's body, shaucha suggests clean surroundings, along with fresh and clean food to purify the body. Lack of shaucha might be the result, for example, of letting toxins build up in the body.

Shaucha includes purity of speech and mind. Anger, hate, prejudice, greed, lust, pride, fear, and negative thoughts are sources of impurity of mind. Impurities of the intellect can be cleansed through the process of self-examination, or knowledge of self (Adhyatma-Vidya). The mind is purified through mindfulness and meditation on one's intent, feelings, actions, and its causes.

Teachers of the Vedanta path of yoga prepare to have holy thoughts and to perform holy actions. Students and the young help teachers prepare for worship, building self-control and selflessness. Sarada Devi said "pure mind begets ecstatic love (prema-bhakti)".

== Literature ==
Shaucha is included as one of five niyamas in Yoga, that is activity that is recommended for spiritual development of an individual. Verse II.32 of Yogasutra lists the five niyamas. In verse II.40, Patanjali describes outer purity, while verse II.41 discusses inner purity, as follows:

सत्त्वशुद्धिसौमनस्यैकाग्र्येन्द्रियजयात्मदर्शन योग्यत्वानि च

—Patanjali Yogasutras
Translation:

Through cleanliness and purity of body and mind (shaucha, shudhi)
comes a purification of the essence (sattva),
a goodness and gladness of feeling,
a sense of focus with intentness, the mastery and union of the senses,
and a fitness, preparation and capability for self-realization.

Shaucha is one of the ten yamas (virtuous restraints) listed by Śāṇḍilya Upanishad, as well as by Svātmārāma.

The Epic Mahabharata mentions the virtue of purity (shaucha) in numerous books. For example, in Book 14 Chapter 38, it lists shaucha as a quality found in the liberated, happy, and dharmic person,

निर्ममॊ निरहंकारॊ निराशीः सर्वतः समः । अकाम हत इत्य एष सतां धर्मः सनातनः ॥
विश्रम्भॊ हरीस तितिक्षा च तयागः शौचम अतन्द्रिता । आनृशंस्यम असंमॊहॊ दया भूतेष्व अपैशुनम ॥
हर्षस तुष्टिर विस्मयश च विनयः साधुवृत्तता । शान्ति कर्म विशुद्धिश च शुभा बुद्धिर विमॊचनम ॥
उपेक्षा बरह्मचर्यं च परित्यागश च सर्वशः । निर्ममत्वम अनाशीस्त्वम अपरिक्रीत धर्मता ॥

—Ashvamedhika Parva, The Mahabharata, 14.38.5–8
Translation:

(He is) free from possessiveness, free from egoism, free from pessimism, looks on all with an equal eye, free from craving. (In him) is seen confidence, endurance, renunciation, purity, absence of laziness, absence of cruelty, absence of delusion, compassion for all creatures, absence of the disposition to slander others or to exult at gains; (he is) satisfied, humble, emancipated, indifferent, peaceful, unaffected by ups and downs, pursuer of Brahma, and exhibits purity in all acts aiming for tranquillity, understanding and the right.

Bhagavad Gita describes purity at three levels in Book 17, verses 14–16, namely body, speech and thoughts. Purity of body comes from cleanliness of body as well as from what one eats and drinks. Purity of speech comes from being truthful and through use of words that are not injurious, hurtful, or distressing to others or self. Purity of thoughts comes from reflection, peace of mind, silence, calmness, gentleness, and purity of being.

Purity of mind, speech, and body has been one of the important virtues in Indian philosophy.

== See also ==
- Ahiṃsā – Ancient Indian principle of nonviolence
- Akrodha – Important virtue in Indian philosophy and Hindu ethics
- Ārjava – Hindu philosophical concept
- Asteya – Non-stealing, a virtue in Indian religions
- Brahmacharya – Motivated abstinence from worldly pleasures
- Dāna (charity) – Concept of charity in Indian religions
- Dayā (compassion) – Movement or motivation to help others
- Dhṛti – Yama (ethical rule) in Hinduism
- Dhyana in Hinduism – Training of the mind through meditation in Hinduism
- Kṣamā (forgiveness) – Renunciation or cessation of resentment, indignation, or anger
- Mitahara – Concept in Indian philosophy
- Sattva – Hindu philosophical concept
- Satya – Sanskrit word and a virtue in Indian religions
