= Akrodha =

Important virtue in Indian philosophy and Hindu ethics

Akrodha (Sanskrit: अक्रोध) literally means "free from anger". It is an important virtue in Indian philosophy and Hindu ethics.

== Etymology ==
Akrodha is a fusion word between the Sanskrit prefix a (Sanskrit: अ; "without", "non") and the term krodha (Sanskrit: क्रोध; "anger"), meaning "without anger".

A related word is akrodhah (Sanskrit: अक्रोध), which also means "absence of anger".

== Discussion ==
Akrodha is considered a virtue and desirable ethical value in Hinduism. When there is cause of anger but nevertheless there is absence of anger, this is non-anger or akrodha. Absence of anger (akrodha) means being calm even when insulted or rebuked, or despite great provocation. Akrodha does not mean absence of causes of anger, it means not getting angry and keeping an even, calm temper despite the circumstances.

Krodha ("anger") is excessive mental turmoil on account of obstacles interfering with the gratification of some desire; it is manifestation of the quality of tamas (dark, negative, destructive), an undesirable psychological state. The opposite of krodha is akrodha: a productive, positive, and constructive state.

Bhawuk states that akrodha is necessary for peace and happiness, which is a state of contentment (santustah) where there is absence of spite or envy (advestah), absence of anger (akrodhah), and absence of violence (ahimsa). Dharma relies on akrodha, because it creates an environment of serenity, a rational principle of life, and because it is a moral virtue inspired by love.

== Literature ==
According to Vedic sages, when work becomes akin to a yajna (a worship ceremony), the effect of that work is transformed into apurva, that is, it becomes something unique, unprecedented, and empowering. In contrast, anger clouds reason, which results in the loss of discrimination between right and wrong and virtue and vice. When the discriminating faculty is ruined, the person loses self-identity and the inner good perishes. With freedom from anger, a person reaches an apurva state.

=== The Upanishads ===
The Naradaparivrajaka Upanishad states the nature of akrodha for a person who seeks self-knowledge and liberation (kaivalya) as follows:

All cruel words should be endured. None should be treated with disrespect. No anger should be directed in turn towards one who is angry. Only soft words should be spoken, even when violently pulled by another.

— Narada Parivrajaka Upanishad, Atharva Veda,

Akrodha, states Manickam, is related to the concept sahya (Sanskrit: सह्य) in the Upanishads. Sahya means, depending on the context, "to bear", "endure", "suffer", and "put up with". Sahya is considered an ethical value in Hinduism, not out of weakness to react, but for the cause of the Ultimate Truth. It is the attribute by which a person willingly bears what is unpleasant in order to "win over" the opponent or whatever is offensive, in the pursuit of holding on to Truth, in order to achieve oneness with Brahman, the Ultimate Truth. This endurance, this striving to overcome the adversaries through akrodha and ahimsa, is the constructive way to pursue Truth.

=== The Epics ===
The Hindu epic Mahabharata repeatedly emphasizes the virtue of akrodha. For example, in Adi Parva, it states:

If wronged, you should not wrong in return. One's anger, if not subdued, burns one's own self; if subdued, it procures the virtues of the doers of good acts. You should never give pain to others by cruel words. Never defeat your enemies by despicable means. Never utter sinful and burning words as may give pain to others.

— The Mahabharata, Adi Parva, Chapter LXXXVII, verses 7–8,

In Vana Parva, the Mahabharata states:

Anger is in this world, the root of the destruction of mankind. The angry man commits a sin; the angry man murders his preceptor; the angry man insults with harsh words. The angry man cannot distinguish what should be and should not be said by him; there is nothing which cannot be said or done by an angry man. From anger, a man may kill one who should not be killed and adore one that should be slain; an angry man may even despatch his own self to the abode of Yama. Beholding these evils, anger must be conquered.

— The Mahabharata, Vana Parva, Chapter XXIX, verses 3–7,

In Shanti Parva, the Mahabharata states:

That Yogin who is freed from attachment and pride, who transcends all pairs of opposites such as pleasure and pain, who never gives way to wrath or hate, who never speaks an untruth, who though slandered or struck still shows friendship for the slanderer or the striker, who never thinks of doing ill to others, who restrains these three, viz. speech, acts and mind, and who behaves uniformly towards all creatures, succeeds in approaching Brahman (true self).

— The Mahabharata, Shanti Parva, Chapter CCXXXVI,

The Bhagavad Gita (Slokas XVI.1–3), in the Mahabharata, gives a list of twenty-six divine attributes beginning with abhayam ("fearlessness") and sattva sansuddhih ("purity of mind"), ending with adroha ("bearing enmity to none") and naatimaanita ("absence of arrogance"), and including akrodha:

अभयं सत्त्वसंशुध्दिर्ज्ञानयोगव्यवस्थितिः
दानं दमश्च यज्ञश्च स्वाध्यायस्तप आर्जवम्

अहिंसा सत्यमक्रोधस्त्यागः शान्तिरपैशुनम्
दया भूतेष्वलोलुप्त्वं मार्दवं ह्रीरचापलाम्

तेजः क्षमा धृतिः शौचमद्रोहो नातिमानिता
भवन्ति सम्पदं दैवीमभिजातस्य भारत

=== Dharmasastra ===
Manu listed akrodha among the ten primary virtues. The Apastambhadharmasutra (I.iii.22) rules that a student be not given to anger, and that a house-holder abstains from anger and from action or words that would provoke someone else to anger (II.xviii.2). The Baudhayanadharmasutra (I.xv.30) requires a house-holder never to be angry, and the Gautamdharmasutra (II.13) advises that he must not feel angry. The Vashisthadharmasutra (IV.4) avers that refraining from anger is a virtue like truthfulness or charity.

Manu mentions ten Dharma Lakshanas, akrodha is one of these lakshana (attribute, sign of a dharmic person). The other nine are: dhriti (patience), kshama (forgiveness), damah (temperance), asteya (non-stealing), shaucham (purity), indriyaigraha (freedom from sensual craving), dhi (reason), vidya (knowledge), and satyam (truth).

=== Shaivism ===
The Shaivite doctrine considers four yamas for the Pashupata ascetic who smears on his body bhasam. These four yamas are – non-injury, celibacy, truthfulness, and non-stealing; the niyamas consist of non-irritability (akrodha), attendance on the teachers, purity, lightness of diet, and carefulness (apramada). Akrodha is a virtue.

== Universalism ==
Hinduism and Buddhism both suggest ten freedoms needed for good life. These are – Ahimsa ('freedom from violence'), Asteya ('freedom from want, stealing'), Aparigraha ('freedom from exploitation'), Amritava ('freedom from early death') and Arogya ('freedom from disease'), Akrodha ('freedom of anger'), Jnana or Vidya ("freedom from ignorance"), Pravrtti ("freedom of conscience"), Abhaya ('freedom from fear') and Dhrti ('freedom from frustration and despair').

== See also ==
- Ahiṃsā – Ancient Indian principle of nonviolence
- Ārjava – Hindu philosophical concept
- Asteya – Non-stealing, a virtue in Indian religions
- Brahmacharya – Motivated abstinence from worldly pleasures
- Dāna – Concept of charity in Indian religions
- Dayā – Movement or motivation to help others
- Dhṛti – Yama (ethical rule) in Hinduism
- Kṣamā – Renunciation or cessation of resentment, indignation, or anger
- Mitahara – Concept in Indian philosophy
- Satya – Sanskrit word and a virtue in Indian religions
- Shaucha – Cleanliness in Indic religions and yoga
