= Yogatattva Upanishad =

Sanskrit text, Yoga Upanishad

- Devanagari: योगतत्त्व
- Title means: Yoga and truth
- Date: 150 AD
- Linked Veda: Atharvaveda
- Verses: 143
- Philosophy: Vedanta

The Yogatattva Upanishad (Sanskrit: योगतत्त्व उपनिषत्, IAST: Yogatattva Upaniṣhad), also called as Yogatattvopanishad (योगतत्त्वोपनिषत्), is an important Upanishad within Hinduism. A Sanskrit text, it is one of eleven Yoga Upanishads attached to the Atharvaveda, and one of twenty Yoga Upanishads in the four Vedas. It is listed at number 41 in the serial order of the Muktika enumerated by Rama to Hanuman in the modern era anthology of 108 Upanishads. It is, as an Upanishad, a part of the corpus of Vedanta literature collection that present the philosophical concepts of Hinduism.

Two major versions of its manuscripts are known. One has fifteen verses but attached to Atharvaveda, while another very different and augmented manuscript exists in the Telugu language which has one hundred and forty two verses and is attached to the Krishna Yajurveda. The text is notable for describing Yoga in the Vaishnavism tradition.

The Yogatattva Upanishad shares ideas with the Yogasutra, Hatha Yoga, and Kundalini Yoga. It includes a discussion of four styles of yoga: Mantra, Laya, Hatha yoga and Raja. As an expounder of Vedanta philosophy, the Upanishad is devoted to the elaboration of the meaning of Atman (Soul, Self) through the process of yoga, starting with the syllable Om. According to Yogatattva Upanishad, "jnana (knowledge) without yoga cannot secure moksha (emancipation, salvation), nor can yoga without knowledge secure moksha", and that "those who seek emancipation should pursue both yoga and knowledge".

== Etymology ==
Yoga (from the Sanskrit root yuj) means "to add", "to join", "to unite", or "to attach" in its most common literal sense. According to Dasgupta – a scholar of Sanskrit and philosophy, the term yoga can be derived from either of two roots, yujir yoga (to yoke) or yuj samādhau (to concentrate).

Yogatattva is compound word of "Yoga" and 'tattva', the latter meaning "Truth", or "Reality, That-ness". Paul Deussen – a German Indologist and professor of Philosophy translates the term Yogatattva as "the essence of Yoga".

The term Upanishad means it is knowledge or "hidden doctrine" text that belongs to the corpus of Vedanta literature collection presenting the philosophical concepts of Hinduism and considered the highest purpose of its scripture, the Vedas.

== Chronology and anthologies ==
Estimates of the text's origin include those by Michael Whiteman – a professor of mathematics and a writer on Yoga in Hinduism and Buddhism,) who states it is possibly dated to about 150 CE. David White – a professor of Comparative Religion, in contrast, suggests that the text derives its "ideas and images from the heritage of classical Vedanta", and it is likely a medieval era text composed between 11th- to 13th-century CE.

In the collection of Upanishads under the title "Oupanekhat", put together by Sultan Mohammed Dara Shikhoh in 1656, consisting of a Persian translation of 50 Upanishads and who prefaced it as the best book on religion, the Yogatattva is listed at number 21. Dara Shikoh's collection was in the same order as found in Upanishad anthologies popular in north India. In the 52 Upanishads version of Colebrooke this Upanishad is listed at 23. In the Bibliothica Indica edition of Narayana – an Indian scholar who lived sometime after the 14th-century Vedanta scholar Sankarananda, the Upanishad is also listed at 23 in his list of 52.

== Structure ==
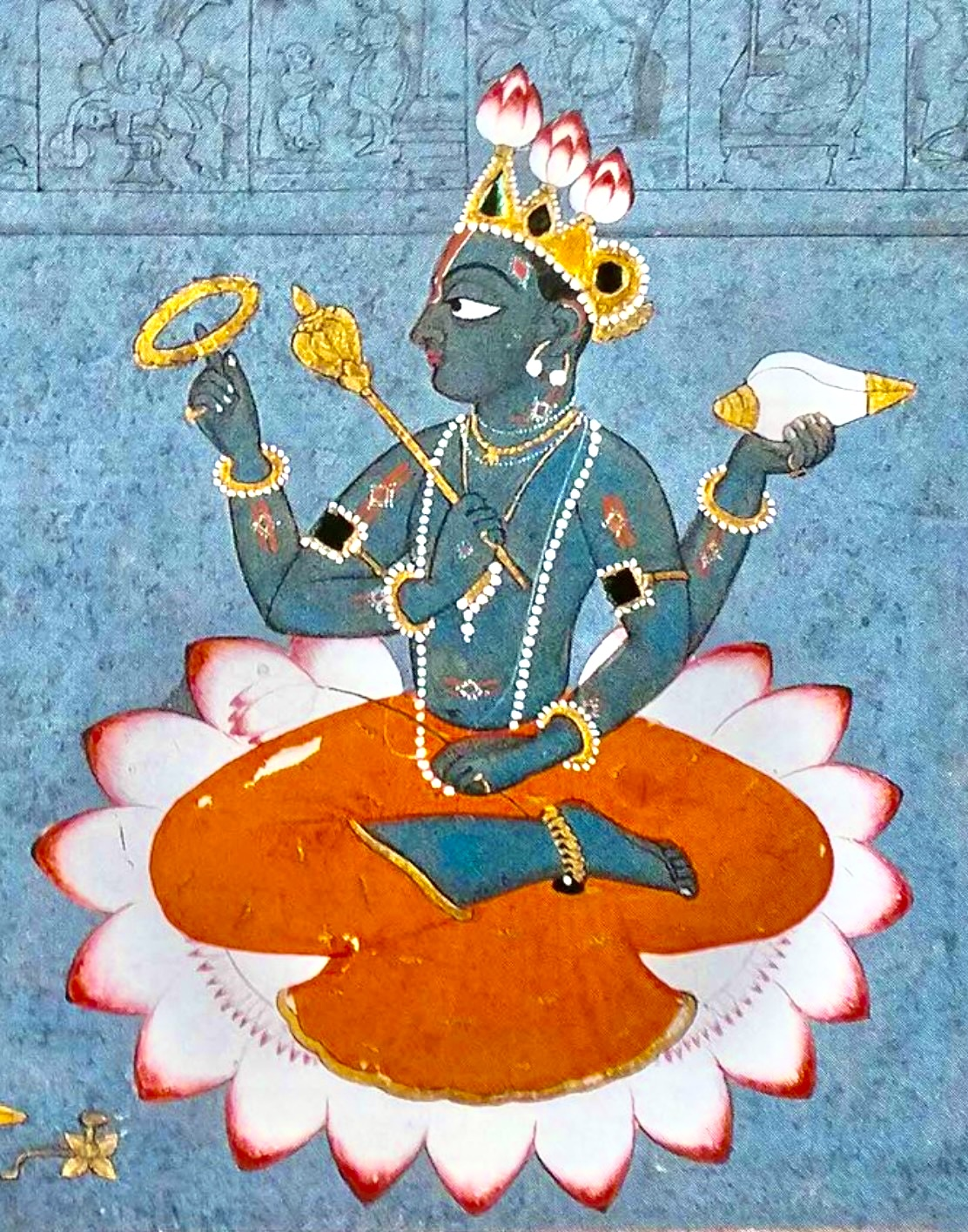
Vishnu, the supreme Yogin

The Telugu version of the Yogatattva Upanishad has 142 verses, while the shortest surviving manuscript in Sanskrit is just 15 verses. Deussen describes the Telugu edition as having a "considerably augmented form" and notes that it has the same first two stanzas, then "about a hundred Slokas" before returning to stanzas corresponding to the 15 sloka recension. Both versions open by hailing Hindu god Vishnu as the supreme Purusha or supreme spirit, the great Yogin, the Supreme Being, the great Tapasvin (performer of austerities), and a lamp in the path of the truth. This links the text to the Vaishnava tradition of Hinduism.

The meaning and message in verses 3 to 15 of the Sanskrit version mirror those of the last 13 verses of the Telugu version of the text.

== Contents ==
According to Eliade, the Yogatattva Upanishad is one of the first Upanishads to provide a detailed description of Yoga techniques and their benefits.

For the first time, an Upanishad gives numerous and precise details concerning the extraordinary powers gained by practice and meditation. The four chief asanas (siddha, padma, simha and bhadra) are mentioned, as are the obstacles encountered by beginners – sloth, talkativeness, etc. A description of pranayama follows, together with the definition of the matra (unit of measurement for the phases of respiration), and important details of mystical physiology (the purification of the nadis is shown by external signs: lightness of body, brilliance of complexion, increase in digestive power, etc.

— Mircea Eliade on Yogatattva Upanishad, Yoga: Immortality and Freedom

=== Self realization and virtues of a yoga student ===
On Hindu god Brahma's request Vishnu explains that all souls are caught up in the cycle of worldly pleasures and sorrow created by Maya (changing reality). and Kaivalya can help overcome this cycle of birth, old age and disease. Knowledge of the shastras are futile in this regard, states Vishnu, and the description of the "indescribable state of liberation" eludes them and even the devas.

It is only the knowledge of ultimate reality and supreme self, the Brahman, which can lead to the path of liberation and self-realization, states Yogatattva Upanishad. This realization of the supreme self is possible to the yoga student who is free from "passion, anger, fear, delusion, greed, pride, lust, birth, death, miserliness, swoon, giddiness, hunger, thirst, ambition, shame, fright, heart-burning, grief and gladness".

=== Yoga and knowledge ===
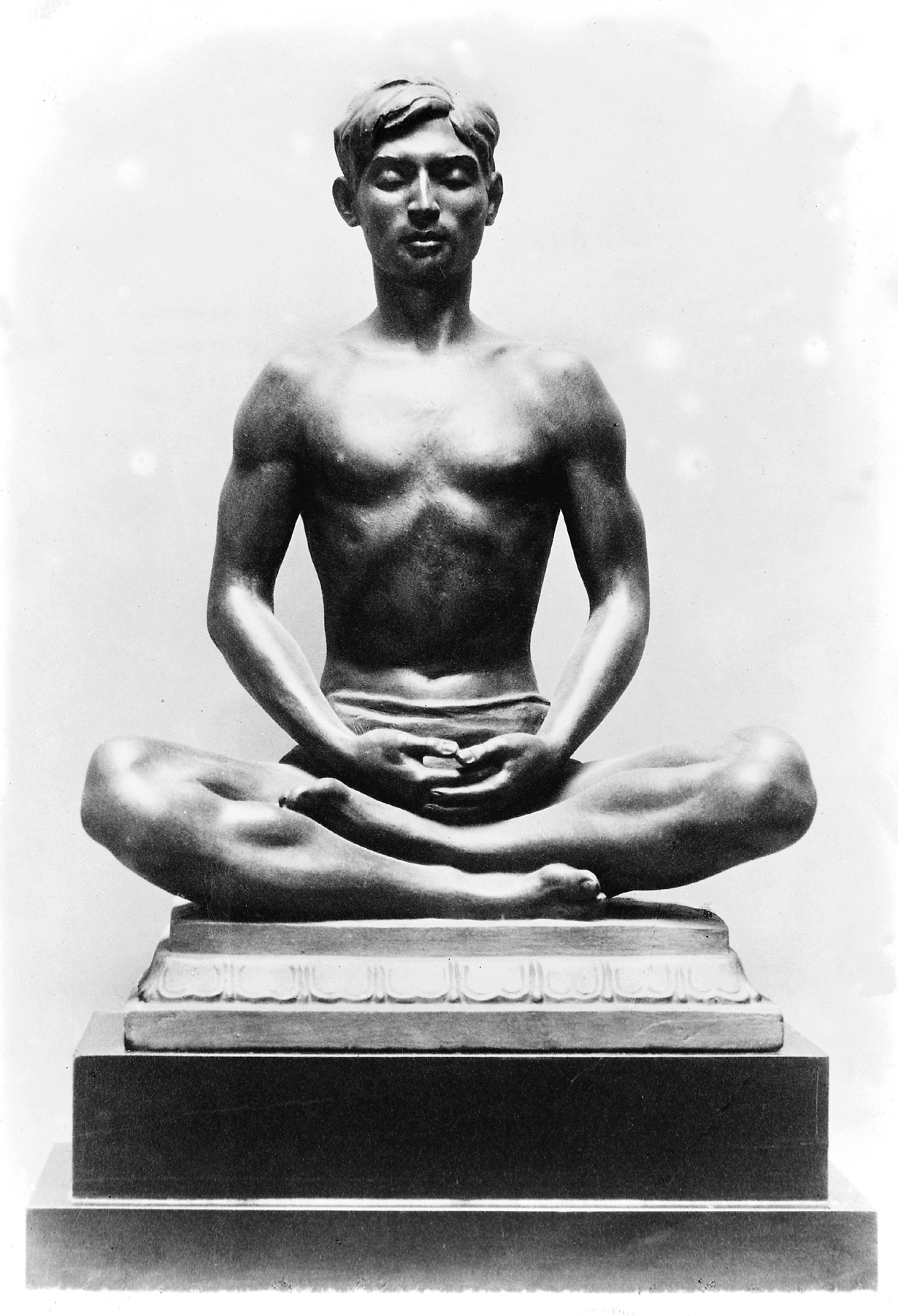
Yoga is described as a means to meditation in the text.

In the early verses of the Yogatattva Upanishad, the simultaneous importance of yoga and jnana (knowledge) are asserted, and declared to be mutually complementary and necessary.

तस्माद्दोषविनाशार्थमुपायं कथयामि ते । योगहीनं कथं ज्ञानं मोक्षदं भवति ध्रुवम् ॥
योगो हि ज्ञानहीनस्तु न क्षमो मोक्षकर्मणि । तस्माज्ज्ञानं च योगं च मुमुक्षुर्दृढमभ्यसेत् ॥
अज्ञानादेव संसारो ज्ञानादेव विमुच्यते । ज्ञानस्वरूपमेवादौ ज्ञानं ज्ञेयैकसाधनम् ॥

I relate to you the means to be employed for destruction of errors;
Without the practice of yoga, how could knowledge set the Atman free?
Inversely, how could the practice of yoga alone, devoid of knowledge, succeed in the task?
The seeker of Liberation must direct his energies to both simultaneously.
The source of unhappiness lies in Ajnana (ignorance);
Knowledge alone sets one free. This is a dictum found in all Vedas.

– Yogatattva verses 14–16

The text defines "knowledge", translates Aiyar – a Sanskrit scholar, as "through which one cognizes in himself the real nature of kaivalya (moksha) as the supreme seat, the stainless, the partless, and of the nature of Sacchidananda" (truth-consciousness-bliss). This knowledge is of the Brahman and its non-differentiated nature with that of the Atman, of Jiva and Paramatman. Yoga and knowledge (jnana) both go together to realise Brahman and attain salvation, according to the Upanishad.

=== Yogas ===
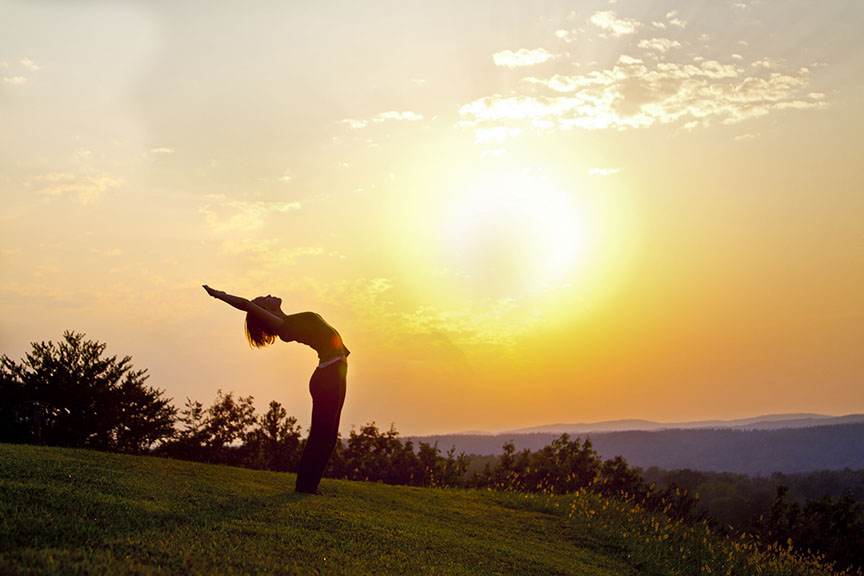
Yogatattva Upanishad emphasizes Hatha yoga (shown).

In the Upanishad, Vishnu states to Brahma that Yoga is one, in practice of various kinds, the chief are of four types – Mantra Yoga is the practice through chants, Laya Yoga through deep concentration, Hatha Yoga through exertion, and Raja Yoga through meditation.

There are four states which are common to all these yogas, states the text, and these four stages of attainment are: Arambha (beginning, the stage of practicing ethics such as non-violence and proper diet, followed by asana), Ghata (second integration stage to learn breath regulation and relationship between body and mind), Parichaya (the third intimacy stage to hold, regulate air flow, followed by meditation for relationship between mind and Atman), and Nishpatti (fourth stage to consummate Samadhi and realize Atman). The emphasis and most verses in the text are dedicated to Hatha Yoga, although the text mentions Raja yoga is the culmination of Yoga.

The Mantra yoga is stated by the Yogatattva as a discipline of auditory recitation of mantras but stated to be an inferior form of yoga. It is the practice of mantra recitation or intonations of the sounds of alphabet, for 12 years. This gradually brings knowledge and special powers of inner attenuation, asserts the text. This mantra-based method of yoga, asserts Yogatattva, is suited for those with dull wit and incapable of practicing the other three types of yoga.

Laya yoga is presented as the discipline of dissolution where the focus is on thinking of the "Lord without parts" all the times while going through daily life activities. The Laya Yoga, the second in the order of importance, is oriented towards assimilation by the chitta or mind, wherein the person always thinks of formless Ishvara (God).

Of the ten Yamas, Mitahara (moderate food) is most important. Of the ten Niyamas, O four-faced one, Ahimsa (non-violence) is most important.

— Yogatattva Upanishad 28–29

The Hatha Yoga, to which Yogatattva Upanishad dedicates most of its verses, is discussed with eight interdependent practices: ten yamas (self-restraints), ten niyamas (self-observances), asana (postures), pranayama (control of breath), pratyahara (conquering the senses), dharana (concentration), dhyana, and samadhi that is the state of meditative consciousness.

The text discusses meditation and thereafter through verse 128, twenty stages of Hatha Yoga practice such as of Maha-mudra, Maha-Bandha, Khechari mudra, Mula Bandha, Uddiyana bandha, Jalandhara Bandha, Vajroli, Amaroli and Sahajoli. Thereafter, the Upanishad asserts Raja yoga to be the means for Yogin to detach himself from the world, translates Ayyangar – a Sanskrit scholar. The tool for meditation, states the text, is Pranava or Om mantra, which it describes in verses 134–140, followed by a statement of the nature of liberation and the ultimate truth.

==== Asanas ====
Asanas in Yogatattva Upanishad
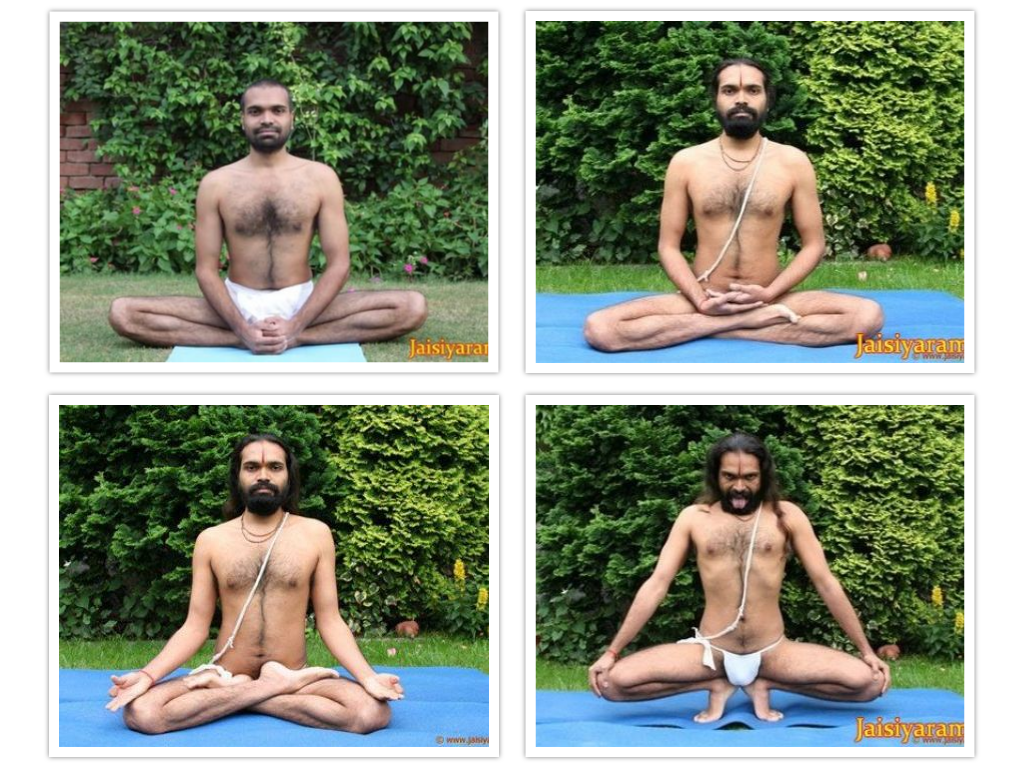
- Yoga tattva upanishad - 4 chief asanas for Pranayama Main postures discussed for pranayama practice (clock-wise - Bhadrasana, Siddhasana, Simhasana, Padmasana)

The Upanishad mentions many asanas, but states four postures of the yoga for the beginner commencing on pranayama (breathing exercises) – Siddhasana, Padmasana, Simhasana and Bhadrasana. The detailed procedure and the setting for these are described in the text.

Sitting in Padmasana (lotus) posture, the text states that the pranayama or breathing must be gradual, both inhalation, holding and exhalation should be slow, steady and deep. The text introduces a series of time measures (matras, musical beats) to aid self monitoring and to measure progress, wherein the beat is created by the yoga student with fingers self circumambulating and using one's own knee for the beat pulse. A sequential gradual inhalation over sixteen Matras (digits), holding the air deep within for sixty-four Matras and gradually exhaling the air over thirty-two Matras is suggested as the goal of the breathing exercise.

Whatever the Yogin sees with his eyes, he should conceive of all that as the Atman (soul, self). Similarly, whatever he hears, smells, tastes and touches, he should conceive of all that as the Atman.

— Yogatattva Upanishad 69–72

The Upanishad suggests breathing exercises in a variety of ways, such as breathing with one nostril and exhaling with another, asserting that a regular practice multiple times a day cleans up the Nadis (blood vessels), improves digestive powers, stamina, leanness and causes the skin to glow. The text recommends restraining oneself from salt, mustard, acidic foods, spicy astringent pungent foods. The text also states that the yoga student should avoid fasting, early morning baths, sexual intercourse, and sitting near fire. Milk and ghee (clarified butter), cooked wheat, green gram and rice are foods the text approves of, in verses 46–49. The Upanishad also recommends massage, particularly areas of body that tremor or profusely perspire during the practice of yoga.

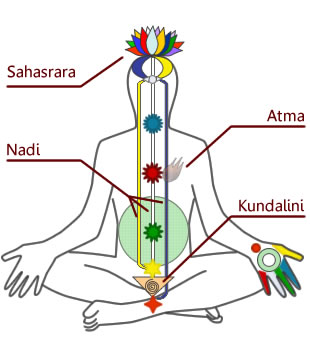
Kundalini Yoga

The next stage of Yoga practice, states the text, is termed Ghata (Sanskrit: घट) with the goal of bringing union of Prana (breath), Apana (hydration and aeration of body), Manas (mind) and Buddhi (intellect), as well as between Jivatma (life soul force) and Paramatman (supreme soul). This practice is a step, asserts the text, for Pratyahara (withdrawal from distraction by sensory organs) and Dharana (concentration). The aim of Dharana, states Yogatattva, is to conceive everyone and everything one perceives with any of his senses as same as his own self and soul (Atman). In verses 72 to 81, the text describes a range of mystical powers that develop within those who have mastered Ghata stage of yoga. The Upanishad adds that "perfection requires practice, the yogin must never revel in what he achieves, never be vain, never be distracted by trying to comply with demonstration requests, remain oblivious to others, yet be always intent on achieving the goals he sets for himself".

==== Kundalini ====
The Upanishad, in verse 82 and onwards, elaborates on the third stage of Yogic practice, calling it the paricaya (Sanskrit: परिचय, intimacy) state. It is the stage where the yogin awakens the Kundalini, asserts the text. Kundalini, states James Lochtefeld – a professor of Religion and Asian Studies, refers to "the latent spiritual power that exists in every person". The premise mentioned in Yogatattva, is also a fundamental concept in Tantra, and symbolizes an aspect of Shakti that is typically dormant in every person, and its awakening is a goal in Tantra. In Yogatattva text, this stage is described as where the Yogin's Chitta (mind) awakens and enters the Sushumna and the chakras.

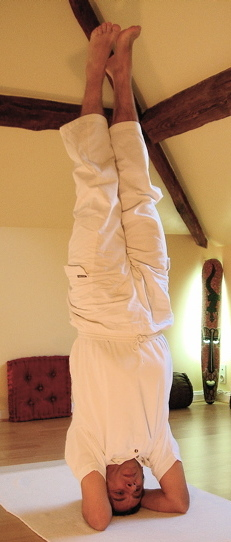
Sirsasana.

Samadhi is that state in which the Jiva-atman (lower self) and the Param-atman (higher self) are differenceless.

— Yogatattva Upanishad 107

The five elements of Prthivi, Apas, Agni, Vayu and Akash are called as the "five Brahmans" corresponding to five gods within (Brahma, Vishnu, Rudra, Ishvara and Sada-Shiva), and reaching them is described by the text as a process of meditation. The meditation on each, asserts Yogatattva, is assisted by colors, geometry and mantras: prthivi with yellow-gold, quadrilateral and Laṃ, apas with white, crescent and Vaṃ, agni with red, triangle and Raṃ, vayu with black, satkona (hexagram) and Yaṃ, akash with smoke, circle and Haṃ.

The Upanishad dedicates verses 112 through 128 on a variety of Hatha yoga asanas. The procedure and benefits of yoga practices of Sirsasana (standing on the head for 24 minutes), Vajroli and Amaroli are explained briefly by the text. With these practices the Yogin attains the Raja Yoga state, realizes the facts of the life cycle of mother-son-wife relationship.

==== Om meditation ====
(these three letters "AUM"...) is no different than the Brahman, by that Yogin in the Turiya-state pervades the entire world of phenomena, in the belief "all this is I alone". That is the Truth. That alone is the transcendent existence, which is the substratum.

— Yogatattva Upanishad 135–136

The Upanishad expounds the principles behind Om mantra as part of the yogic practice asserting that "A", "U" and "M" are three letters that mirror the "three Vedas, three Sandhyas (morning, noon and evening), three Svaras (sounds), three Agnis and three Guṇas". It compares the realization of the hidden principle within Om to finding fragrance in a flower, ghee (clarified butter) in milk, oil innate in sesame seeds, gold in ore, and the Atman in one's heart. The letter "A" represents the flowering of lotus, "U" represents the blooming of the flower, "M" reaches its nada (tattva or truth inside, sound), and "ardhamatra" (half-metre) indicates the Turiya, or bliss of silence.

The Upanishad states that, through the prescribed yogic practices, the yogin masters the functioning of nine orifices of the body, awakens the Sushumna inwards, awakens his Kundalini, becomes self-aware, knows the Truth, and gains the conviction of his Atman.

== Reception ==
Yogin's relationship with the world

At an unprohibited far off place,
Calm and quiet, undisturbed,
The Yogin guarantees protection,
To all beings, as to his own self.

— Yogatattva Upanishad 15 (Sanskrit)

Yogatattva Upanishad is one of the most important text on Yoga.

It is the Yogatattva that appears to be most minutely acquainted with yogic practices: it mentions the eight angas and distinguishes the four kinds of yoga: Mantra yoga, Laya yoga, Hatha yoga and Raja yoga.

— Mircea Eliade, Yoga: Immortality and Freedom

The text, states Whiteman, discusses a variety of Yoga systems, including the Hatha yoga, "a system of practices developed intensively', with the basic objective of "health and cleanliness of the physical body and perfection of voluntary control over all its functions." A notable feature of this Upanishad is definition of four types of yoga and a comparison.

The Yogatattva Upanishad and the Brahma Upanishad are also known as one of the early sources of tantric ideas related to chakras, which were adopted in Tibetan Buddhism. However, states Yael Bentor, there are minor differences between the location of inner fires as described in the texts of Tibetan Buddhism and in Yogatattva text of Hinduism.

== See also ==
- Yoga (philosophy)
- Yoga Vasistha
- Yoga Yajnavalkya
- Yoga-kundalini Upanishad

== Bibliography ==
- Aiyar, Narayanasvami (1914). "Thirty minor Upanishads". Archive Organization.
- Ayyangar, TR Srinivasa (1938). The Yoga Upanishads. The Adyar Library.
- Cardin, Matt (28 July 2015). Ghosts, Spirits, and Psychics: The Paranormal from Alchemy to Zombies: The Paranormal from Alchemy to Zombies. ABC-CLIO. ISBN 978-1-61069-684-5.
- Derek (tr), Coltman (1989). Yoga and the Hindu Tradition. Motilal Banarsidass. ISBN 978-81-208-0543-9.
- Deussen, Paul (1 January 2010). The Philosophy of the Upanishads. Cosimo, Inc. ISBN 978-1-61640-239-6.
- Deussen, Paul; Bedekar, V.M. (tr.); Palsule (tr.), G.B. (1 January 1997). Sixty Upanishads of the Veda. Motilal Banarsidass. ISBN 978-81-208-1467-7.
- Flood, Gavin D (1996), An Introduction to Hinduism, Cambridge University Press, ISBN 978-0-521-43878-0
- Gyurme, Tenzin (2008). S-Alchemy. Lulu.com. ISBN 978-0-557-43582-1.
- Larson, Gerald James; Potter, Karl H. (1970). Yogatattva Upanishad (Translated by NSS Raman), in The Encyclopedia of Indian Philosophies: Yoga: India's philosophy of meditation. Motilal Banarsidass. ISBN 978-81-208-3349-4.
- Whiteman, Joseph Hilary Michael (1993). Aphorisms on Spiritual Method: The "Yoga Sutras of Patanjali" in the Light of Mystical Experience : Preparatory Studies, Sanskrit Text, Interlinear and Idiomatic English Translations, Commentary and Supplementary Aids. Colin Smythe. ISBN 978-0-86140-354-7.
