= Arjava =

Hindu philosophical concept

Ārjava (Sanskrit: आर्जव) literally means sincerity, straightness, and non-hypocrisy. It is one of the ten yamas in ancient Hindu and Jaina texts.

== Definition ==
Ārjav means straightness, sincerity, and harmony in one’s thought, words, and actions towards oneself and towards others. Kane translates arjava as straightforwardness. It is described in ancient Indian texts as “self-restraint from hypocrisy", and "the absence of hypocrisy”. It is included as one of several virtuous restraints in an individual's path to spirituality. The Maharashtrian poet Vāmana in Avigita, at xvi.1, posits arjava is a form of honesty and purity in a person, and an essential virtue so that one may treat everyone equally, whether that other is one’s child, wife, relative, friend, a stranger, or someone hostile or oneself without any discrimination.

The ethical concept of arjava is synonymous with Adambha (अदम्भ, composite word from अ+दम्भ). Adambha also means non-deceitful, straightforwardness, and sincerity. It is listed as a virtue in the Indian Epics.

== Literature ==
Arjava is one of the ten yamas listed by Śāṇḍilya Upanishad, as well as by Svātmārāma. The other nine are:

1. ahiṃsā (अहिंसा): nonviolence
2. satya (सत्य): truthfulness
3. asteya (अस्तेय): not stealing
4. brahmacharya (ब्रह्मचर्य): celibacy and not cheating on one’s spouse
5. kṣamā (क्षमा): forgiveness
6. dhṛti (धृति): fortitude
7. dayā (दया): compassion
8. mitāhāra (मितहार): measured diet
9. śauca (शौच): purity, cleanliness

In some texts, such as by Adi Sankara, this virtue is called as bhavasamsuddhi, and explained as purity of motive and freedom of mind from hypocrisy, both in one’s social conduct and within oneself where one’s thoughts, words, and actions resonate. It is a virtue that empowers one to act and live without anxiety, anger, prejudice, inner conflict, or confusion. It is also discussed in Bhagwad Gita in verse 17.16.

The Mahābhārata, in book 12, chapter 60, lists adambha (non-hypocrisy) as a virtue along with akrodha (non-anger), kshama (forgiveness), and others. In chapter 278, the epic explains how and why hypocrisy arises, suggesting that it derives from the sin of covetousness, greed, and attachment to superficial possessions.

Patanjali's treatise on Yoga lists only five yamas, which includes non-covetousness and non-possessiveness (asteya and aparigraha respectively), but does not include arjava.

== See also ==
- Ahiṃsā – Ancient Indian principle of nonviolence
- Akrodha – Important virtue in Indian philosophy and Hindu ethics
- Asteya – Non-stealing, a virtue in Indian religions
- Brahmacharya – Motivated abstinence from worldly pleasures
- Dāna – Concept of charity in Indian religions
- Dayā – Movement or motivation to help others
- Dhṛti – Yama (ethical rule) in Hinduism
- Kṣamā – Renunciation or cessation of resentment, indignation, or anger
- Mitahara – Concept in Indian philosophy
- Satya – Sanskrit word and a virtue in Indian religions
- Śauca – Cleanliness in Indic religions and yoga
