= Dhuti =

Dhuti can refer to:

- Dhoti, a men's lower garment traditional in South Asia.
- Dhatri, Dhūti or Dhātā, one of the Ādityas in Hindu scriptures, son of Kashyapa and Aditi.
- Dhrti, an 18-syllable poetic meter sometimes used in ancient Buddhist texts of India
