= Mitahara =

Concept in Indian philosophy

Mitahara (Sanskrit: मिताहार, romanized: Mitāhāra) literally means the habit of moderate eating. Mitahara is also a concept in Indian philosophy, particularly Yoga, that integrates awareness about food, drink, balanced diet and consumption habits and its effect on one's body and mind. It is one of the ten yamas in ancient Indian texts.

== Definition ==
Mitahara is a Sanskrit combination word, from Mita (मित, moderate) and Ahara (आहार, taking food, diet), which together mean moderate diet. In Yoga and other ancient texts, it represents a concept linking nutrition to the health of one's body and mind. It is considered a yamas or self-restraint virtue in some schools of Indian traditions, where one refrains from either eating too much or too little of certain qualities of food. Mitahara is synonymous with Mātrāśin (मात्राशिन्).

== Literature ==
Ancient and medieval era Indian literature on Mitahara are of two categories – one relates to philosophical discussion of moderate diet and proper nutrition, the other category relate to details about Aharatattva (dietetics). The former category include the Upanishads and Sutras that discuss why virtuous self-restraint is appropriate in matters of food, while the latter include Samhitas that discuss what and when certain foods are suitable. A few texts such as Hathayoga Pradipika combine both.

=== The virtue of mitahara ===
Mitahara is discussed in Śāṇḍilya Upanishad, as well as by Svātmārāma. It is one of the yamas (virtuous self restraints) discussed in ancient Indian texts. The other nine yamas are Ahiṃsā (अहिंसा): Nonviolence, Satya (सत्य): truthfulness, Asteya (अस्तेय): not stealing, Brahmacharya (ब्रह्मचर्य): celibacy and not cheating on one's spouse, Kṣamā (क्षमा): forgiveness, Dhṛti (धृति): fortitude, Dayā (दया): compassion, Ārjava (आर्जव): sincerity, non-hypocrisy, and Śauca (शौच): purity, cleanliness.

Some of the earliest ideas behind Mitahara trace to ancient era Taittiriya Upanishad, which in various hymns discusses the importance of food to healthy living, to the cycle of life, as well as to its role in one's body and its effect on Self (Brahman, Atma, Spirit). The Upanishad, states Stiles, notes “from food life springs forth, by food it is sustained, and in food it merges when life departs”.

The Bhagavad Gita includes verses on ‘‘mitahara’’ in Chapter 6. It states in verse 6.16 that a yogi must neither eat too much nor too little, neither sleep too much nor too little, a way of life first formulated by the Buddha as the Middle Way. Understanding and regulating one’s established habits about eating, sleeping and recreation is suggested as essential to the practice of yoga in verse 6.17.

Another ancient text, in a South Indian language, Tirukkuṛaḷ states moderate diet as a virtuous life style. This text, written by Valluvar before c. 500 CE, and sometimes called the Tamil Veda, discusses eating habits and its role in a healthy life (Mitahara), dedicating Chapter 95 of Book 7 to it. Tirukkuṛaḷ states in verses 943 through 945, "eat in moderation, when you feel hungry, foods that are agreeable to your body, refraining from foods that your body finds disagreeable". Valluvar also emphasizes overeating has ill effects on health, in verse 946, as "the pleasures of health abide in the man who eats moderately. The pains of disease dwell with him who eats excessively."

Medieval era Sanskrit texts such as Dasakumara Charita and Hatha Yoga Pradipika discuss Mitahara. For example, Hatha Yoga Pradipika verse 1.57 states the importance of ‘‘mitihara’’, as

ब्रह्मचारी मिताहारी योगी योगपरायणः । अब्दादूर्ध्वं भवेत्सिद्धो नात्र कार्या विचारणा ॥

A brahmachari, practicing mitahara (moderate diet) and tyaga (renunciation, solitude), devoted to yoga achieves success in his enquiry and effort within half a year.

— Hathayoga Pradipika, 1.57

Verses 1.57 through 1.63 of the critical edition of Hathayoga Pradipika suggests that taste cravings should not drive one’s eating habits, rather the best diet is one that is tasty, nutritious and likable as well as sufficient to meet the needs of one’s body and for one’s inner self. It recommends that one must “eat only when one feels hungry” and “neither overeat nor eat to completely fill the capacity of one’s stomach; rather leave a quarter portion empty and fill three quarters with quality food and fresh water”. Verses 1.59 to 1.61 of Hathayoga Pradipika suggests ‘‘mitahara’’ regimen of a yogi avoids foods with excessive amounts of sour, salt, bitterness, oil, spice burn, unripe vegetables, fermented foods or alcohol. The practice of Mitahara, in Hathayoga Pradipika, includes avoiding stale, impure and tamasic foods, and consuming moderate amounts of fresh, vital and sattvic foods.

=== Dietectics and mitahara ===
Charaka Samhita and Sushruta Samhita are among the two largest surviving compendium on nutrition and diet that have survived from ancient and medieval periods of India. Caraka Samhita emphasizes the need to plan and understand the role of diet in health, across Chapters 5, 6, 25, 26 and 27. In verse 25.31, it states "wholesome diet promotes health and growth, unwholesome diet is the most important cause of diseases". In verses 25.38-39, Caraka Samhita classifies foods into groups based on its source and taste, then categorizes them into nutritive and harmful. In Chapters 26 and 27, it suggests that the same food can be nutritive in small amounts while harmful in large amounts or if cooked improperly or if eaten together with foods its lists. Food, claims Caraka Samhita, must be tailored to needs of one's body, state of one's health, climate, season, habits and personal palatability and needs. In the spirit of Mitahara, in Chapter 5, it insists even light, easily digested and nutritious food should be consumed in moderation and should not be consumed in excess of bodily requirements. In Chapter 6, Caraka Samhita recommends that food should be tailored to the season, with rich and fatty foods being beneficial in winter, while light soups, fruits and acidulated drinks more suited for summers. In verses 6.6-7, it suggests that the diet should be planned and nourishing foods consumed in rotation, tailored to one's health condition and personal needs.

As with Caraka Samhita, the other large compendium on health – Sushruta Samhita – includes many chapters on the role of diet and personal needs of an individual. In Chapter 10 of Sushruta Samhita, for example, the diet and nutrition for pregnant women, nursing mothers and young children are described. It recommends milk, butter, fluid foods, fruits, vegetables and fibrous diets for expecting mothers along with soups made from jangala (wild) meat. In most cases, vegetarian diets are preferred and recommended in the Samhitas; however, for those recovering from injuries, growing children, those who do high levels of physical exercise, and expecting mothers, Sutrasthanam's Chapter 20 and other texts recommend carefully prepared meat. Sushruta Samhita also recommends a rotation and balance in foods consumed, in moderation. For this purposes, it classifies foods by various characteristics, such as taste. In Chapter 42 of Sutrasthanam, for example, it lists six tastes – madhura (sweet), amla (acidic), lavana (saline), katuka (pungent), tikta (bitter) and kashaya (astringent). It then lists various sources of foods that deliver these tastes and recommends that all six tastes (flavors) be consumed in moderation and routinely, as a habit for good health.

== Related concepts ==
The concept of Mitahara is discussed in over 30 different ancient and medieval era texts of Hinduism. However, some texts use a different word and concept for the idea of "moderate diet and paying attention to what one eats and drinks". For example, Shivayoga Dipika uses the term Niyatāshana (planned, regulated eating), while Dattatreya Samhita uses Laghrāhāra (eating lightly, small portions of diverse foods).

== See also ==
- Ahiṃsā
- Satya
- Asteya
- Brahmacharya
- Kṣamā
- Dhṛti
- Dayā
- Ārjava
- Śauca
- Akrodha
- Dāna
- Middle Way
