= Rudrani =

Hindu goddess and epithet of Parvati

- Member of Saptamatrikas
- Other names: Parvati, Uma, Maheshvari, Bhavani, Sarvani, Mrdani, Durga
- Venerated in: Hinduism, Shaivism, Shaktism
- Abode: Rudraloka
- Texts: Shiva Purana, Devi Bhagavata Purana, Linga Purana, Skanda Purana, Vayu Purana, Padma Purana
- Gender: Female
- Temples: Associated with the sacred Tirtha of Rudrakoti and Kusasthali.
- Consort: Rudra

Rudrani (Sanskrit: रुद्राणी, romanized: Rudrāṇī) is the consort of Rudra, a Vedic deity regarded to be a form of Shiva in contemporary Hinduism. Rudrani is an epithet of Parvati, the consort of Shiva.

Within the theological frameworks of Shaivism and Shaktism, Rudrani represents the active, immanent energy of Rudra, embodying the inseparable union of "Energy and Being" that constitutes the godhead. She is referenced across numerous Puranic scriptures, including the Shiva Purana, Vayu Purana, Linga Purana, Skanda Purana, Padma Purana, and Devi Bhagavata Purana. In these texts, the name Rudrani is most frequently employed as a title for Devi Parvati (also known as Uma), the primary consort of Shiva. Beyond her spousal role, the epithet Rudrani carries specific theological weight. She is associated with the ugra (fierce or awe-inspiring) aspects of the Goddess, reflecting the formidable nature of Rudra himself. She is also identified as one of the Saptamatrikas (Seven Mothers), the divine shaktis of the principal gods. The Devi Bhagavata Purana, a foundational text of Shaktism, names Rudrani as the specific form of the supreme Goddess who presides over Rudraloka.

== Etymology ==
The name Rudrāṇī is a Sanskrit feminine noun, literally meaning "the wife of Rudra" or "the consort of Rudra." It is formed by taking the masculine noun Rudra (रुद्र, "the Howler" or "the Terrible") and applying the feminine suffix -ānī (आनी). This specific grammatical suffix is used in Sanskrit to denote the feminine counterpart or shakti of a male deity. The epithet Rudrani appears in early Sanskrit texts alongside other such formations, including Indrāṇī (Shakti of Indra), Varuṇānī (Shakti of Varuna), and Bhavānī (Shakti of Bhava). The antiquity of this name is established by its inclusion in the Aṣṭādhyāyī of the classical Sanskrit grammarian Pāṇini (c. 5th century BCE). Pāṇini's work lists the names Bhavani, Sarvani, Rudrani, and Mrdani, identifying them as the respective wives of Shiva under his different appellations: Bhava, Sarva, Rudra, and Mrda. This demonstrates that the concept of Rudra possessing a specific, named feminine counterpart was grammatically and theologically formalized in the pre-Puranic era. The name is also recorded in major Sanskrit lexicons, such as the Sanskrit-English Dictionary by Monier Monier-Williams.

== Scriptural references and identity ==
Rudrani's identity is elaborated upon across a wide range of Puranic and Tantric literature, where she is simultaneously identified with the supreme Goddess Parvati, defined as the sovereign of Rudra's realm, and depicted as a fierce Matrika (Mother) goddess.

=== Identification with Parvati and Uma ===
Puranic texts frequently engage in a theological harmonization, synthesizing various goddess epithets into the singular identity of Mahadevi as Parvati or Uma. The Vayu Purana provides a clear example of this identification. The text first praises Rudrani, stating, "Rudrani was the best among them. She excelled others by her good attributes." In the immediate subsequent verses, the text refers to this same figure as Uma, noting, "Between Uma and Sankara the mutual love (was ideal)." This narrative juxtaposition establishes a direct synonymity between the names. The Shiva Purana similarly reinforces this connection, identifying Parvati as the "consort of Rudra." In this context, the name Rudrani is used to signify Parvati's specific aspect of "devotion and strength" as Shiva's consort.

=== Role in the Devi Bhagavata Purana ===
From the distinct theological perspective of Shaktism, where the Goddess is venerated as the supreme and ultimate reality (Brahman), Rudrani's role is further defined. The Devi Bhagavata Purana states that the "supreme Reality is non-dual Sakti, that can be called Brahman also," and that any "difference is mere illusion." This text explicitly identifies Rudrani as the name of the Divine Mother who presides over Rudraloka, the celestial realm of Rudra. In this Shakta framework, the hierarchy is distinct from the Shaiva view: Rudrani is the Shakti (power) who "helps Rudra" perform his cosmic duties. She is identified as the Prakriti (Primal Nature), the material cause from which the universe manifests, and the Kriya Shakti (Power of Action) through which the static, conscious Brahman (Rudra/Shiva) is empowered to act.

=== Fierce (Ugra) nature and Matrika identity ===
The name Rudrani inherently carries the ugra (fierce, terrible, or awe-inspiring) connotations of her consort, Rudra. Scholarly analysis of Puranic mythology suggests a causal link: because Rudra is identified with the Vedic storm god and a "cruel" deity, "His wife Rudrani becomes the cruel goddess of bloody sacrifices." This ugra aspect is invoked in scriptural prayers, such as in the Yajnavalkya Smriti, which contains a supplication: "As Rudrani in thy awe-inspiring form, destroy all misfortunes." This fierce nature is demonstrated in Puranic narrative. The Skanda Purana recounts an episode where, upon being challenged by the Daitya demon, it was Rudranī who "sent her" (an emanation, Kalaratri) to engage the demon in combat, thus acting as a martial protector of the cosmic order. This protective, martial function is theologically formalized in Rudrani's identity as one of the Saptamatrikas (Seven Mothers). The Matrikas are a collective of goddesses who represent the personified shaktis (powers) of the primary male deities (Brahma, Vishnu, Rudra, etc.) and are often depicted in a battlefield context. Architectural and iconographic texts, as well as Puranic lists, explicitly name Rudrani (or her synonym, Maheshvari) as the shakti of Rudra within this divine collective.

== Scholarly interpretations ==
Academic scholarship on the history of Shaivism provides a critical, historical model for the development of goddess epithets. Indologist R. G. Bhandarkar, for example, proposed that names such as Rudrani, Bhavani, and Sarvani all tied to appellations of Shiva may not have originally represented a single "one Great Goddess (Maha Devi)." According to this scholarly analysis, these names may have begun as "simply derivatives" or perhaps independent local goddesses. This perspective suggests that the Puranic identification of all these epithets with a single Mahadevi (like Parvati) is the result of a later theological synthesis, which subsumed these distinct figures into a unified Shaiva-Shakta pantheon.

== Worship and associations ==
=== Theological significance ===
In Shaivism, Shiva and his consort are worshipped together, representing the "union of Energy and Being." Within Shakta and monistic (Advaita) Shaiva Tantras, this concept is internalized. The human practitioner, or Sadhaka, is understood to be a microcosm of the divine. As to their essence, the individual is "the static Power-Holder, or Shiva who is pure Consciousness," and as to their "Mind and Body," they are the "manifestation of Shiva's Power, or Shakti or Mother." The object of Sadhana (worship or spiritual practice) is to elevate this internal power to its perfect expression, exchanging limited experience for the "unlimited Whole (Purna) or Perfect Bliss." In this context, Rudrani is identified with a specific, fundamental divine power. Commentary on the Shiva Purana (specifically the Koti Rudra Samhita) identifies Rudrani as Kriya Shakti, the "Power of Action." As Kriya Shakti, she is the divine force of action and creation through which the formless consciousness (Shiva) manifests and governs the cosmos.

=== Iconography ===
Scriptural and architectural texts confirm the existence of specific iconographic instructions for the image (murti) of Rudrani. Treatises on Hindu architecture, such as the Manasara, include stipulations for the "image of Rudrani," particularly in her role as one of the Saptamatrikas. The Skanda Purana provides a textual reference to her image within a temple complex. In a description of the natamandapa (dance hall) of the Jagannatha temple, the text notes that the inner wall contains images of various deities, including "Rudrani, Siva, Katyayani," and others.

=== Association with Shaktipithas and Tirthas ===
Puranic literature grounds the abstract theology of Rudra and Rudrani in a sacred geography of Tirthas (pilgrimage sites). The Padma Purana, in a comprehensive list of sacred sites and their presiding deities, makes a direct and explicit connection: "Rudrani at Rudrakoti." Rudrakoti (also known as Rudravarta) is itself a well-established Tirtha in the Skanda Purana and Mahabharata, revered as a holy site associated with Lord Maheshvara (Rudra) where sages gathered to receive blessings. The Padma Purana thus completes the divine pair, localizing the abstract Shiva-Shakti concept by identifying the presiding goddess (Shakti) of Rudra's Tirtha (Rudrakoti) as his consort, Rudrani. Scholarly sources citing different Upapuranas (Minor Puranas) show textual variations, a common feature of the Puranic genre. For example, some lists associate "Rudrani in Kusasthali."

The following table summarizes the association of goddess epithets with sacred sites as found in Puranic and scholarly sources:

Goddess Epithet	Sacred Site (Tirtha/Pitha)	Source (Primary/Scholarly)
Rudrani	Rudrakoti	Padma Purana
Kali	Kalanjara (mountain)	Padma Purana
Kapila	Mahalinga	Padma Purana
Mangala	Gaya	Padma Purana
Vimala	Purusottama	Padma Purana
Narayani	Suparsva	Padma Purana
Rudrani	Kusasthali	Studies in the Upapuranas (scholarly)
Bhadrakali	Jalandhara	Studies in the Upapuranas (scholarly)
Mahalakshmi	Kola mountain	Studies in the Upapuranas (scholarly)
Ujjani	Ujjayani	Studies in the Upapuranas (scholarly)
