= Yamas =

Ethical rules in Hinduism and Yoga

The yamas (Sanskrit: यम, romanized: yama), and their complement, the niyamas, represent a series of "right living" or ethical rules within Yoga philosophy. The word yama means "reining in" or "control". They are restraints for proper conduct given in the Vedas and the Yoga Sutras as moral imperatives, commandments, rules or goals. The yamas are a "don't"s list of self-restraints, typically representing commitments that affect one's relations with others and self. The complementary niyamas represent the "do"s. Together yamas and niyamas are personal obligations to live well.

The earliest mention of yamas is in the Rigveda. More than fifty texts of Hinduism, from its various traditions, discuss yamas. Patañjali lists five yamas in his Yoga Sūtras. Ten yamas are codified as "the restraints" in numerous Hindu texts, including Yajnavalkya Smriti in verse 3.313, the Śāṇḍilya and Vārāha Upanishads, the Hatha Yoga Pradipika by Svātmārāma, and the Tirumantiram of Tirumular.

The yamas apply broadly and include self-restraints in one's actions, words, and thoughts.

== Etymology and meaning ==
The earliest mention of yamas is found in the Hindu scripture Rigveda, such as in verse 5.61.2, and later in the Jain Agamas. The word yama in the Rigveda means a "rein, curb", the act of checking or curbing, restraining such as by a charioteer or a driver. The term evolves into a moral restraint and ethical duty in the Jain Agamas.

Yamas means "restraint", particularly "from actions, words, or thoughts that may cause harm".

== Philosophical expansion ==
The yamas are explained in detail by Patañjali in the Yoga Sūtras of Patanjali as the first step of the eight-fold path of yogic philosophy and practice for attaining enlightenment and union of the mind, body and soul.

Patanjali lists five yamas: ahimsa, satya, asteya, brahmacharya, and aparigraha. The Yoga Bhashya, a commentary on the Yoga Sutras, explains that ahimsa is the primary yama and that the other four are 'rooted' in ahimsa. Satya, asteya, brahmacharya, and aparigraha are perfected in order to perfect ahimsa. Vacaspati Misra, in this Tattva-Vaisharadi, a sub-commentary on the Yoga Sutras, raises the question of why the latter four yamas even need to be explained if they are all rooted within ahimsa. In his response, he reinforces the link between all five yamas and states that the virtue of ahimsa would be 'defiled' if there were to be a lapse in the latter four yamas.

Shankaracharya, in his Upadeshasahasri, mentions the yamas, alongside virtues such as humility (amanitva) and a lack of anger (akrodhtiva), as disciplines a student must practice in order to acquire knowledge pertaining to liberation.

== Yamas by source ==
The number of Yamas varies with the source:

No.	5 Yamas Yogasūtra 2.30 cf. Ethics of Jainism	10 Yamas Śāṇḍilya Upanishad, Svātmārāma
1	Ahiṃsā (अहिंसा): Non-violence (literally "Non-harming")	
2	Satya (सत्य): Truthfulness (Not lying); speech that is non-deceptive, non-distorted, and purposeful	
3	Asteya (अस्तेय): Not stealing	
4	Brahmacharya (ब्रह्मचर्य): Chastity, sexual restraint, focus (not distracted)	
5	Aparigraha (अपरिग्रहः): Non-avarice, non-possessiveness	
6	—	Kṣamā (क्षमा): Patience, forgiveness.
7	—	Dhrti (धृति): Fortitude, perseverance with the aim to reach the goal
8	—	Dayā (दया): Compassion
9	—	Ārjava (आर्जव): Non-hypocrisy, sincerity
10	—	Mitāhāra (मिताहार): Measured diet

At least sixty ancient and medieval era Indian texts are known that discuss yamas. Most are in Sanskrit, but some are in regional Indian languages. Of the sixty, the lists in eleven of these texts are similar, but not the same, as that of Patanjali's. Other texts list between one and ten yamas; however, ten is the most common.

The order of listed yamas, the names and nature of each yama, as well as the relative emphasis vary between the texts. Some texts use the reverse of niyamas in other texts, as yamas; for example, vairagya (dispassion from hedonism, somewhat reverse of the niyama tapas) is described in verse 33 of Trishikhi Brahmana Upanishad in its list of yamas. Many texts substitute one or more different concepts in their list of yamas. For example, in the ten yamas listed by Yatidharma Sangraha, akrodha (non-anger) is included as a yama. Ahirbudhnya Samhita in verse 31.19 and Darshana Upanishad in verses 1.14-15 include dayā as a yama, and explain it as the ethical restraint of not jumping to conclusions, being compassionate to every being, and considering suffering of others as one's own. In verse 31.21, Ahirbudhnya Samhita includes kṣamā as the virtue of forgiveness and restraint from continued agitation from wrong others have done. Mahakala Samhita in verses II.11.723 through II.11.738 lists many of the ten yamas above, but explains why it is a virtue in a different way. For example, the text explains dayā is an ethical precept and the restraint from too much and too little emotions. It suggests dayā reflects one's inner state, is the expression of kindness towards kin, friend, stranger, and even a hostile person, and that one must remain good and kind no matter what the circumstances. This view of dayā is shared in Shandilya Upanishad and Jabala Darshana Upanishad. Atri Samhita in verse 48, lists anrshamsya (आनृशंस्य) as the restraint from cruelty to any living being by one's actions, words or in thoughts. Shivayoga Dipika in verse 2.9 substitutes sunrta for satya, defining sunrta as "sweet and true speech".

== See also ==
- Dama – Cardinal virtue of control over excess
- Niyama – Recommended activities and habits in Yoga
- Religious vows – Promises made by members of religious communities
- Samatva – Hindu concept of equanimity
