= Chitta =

Village in Punjab, Pakistan

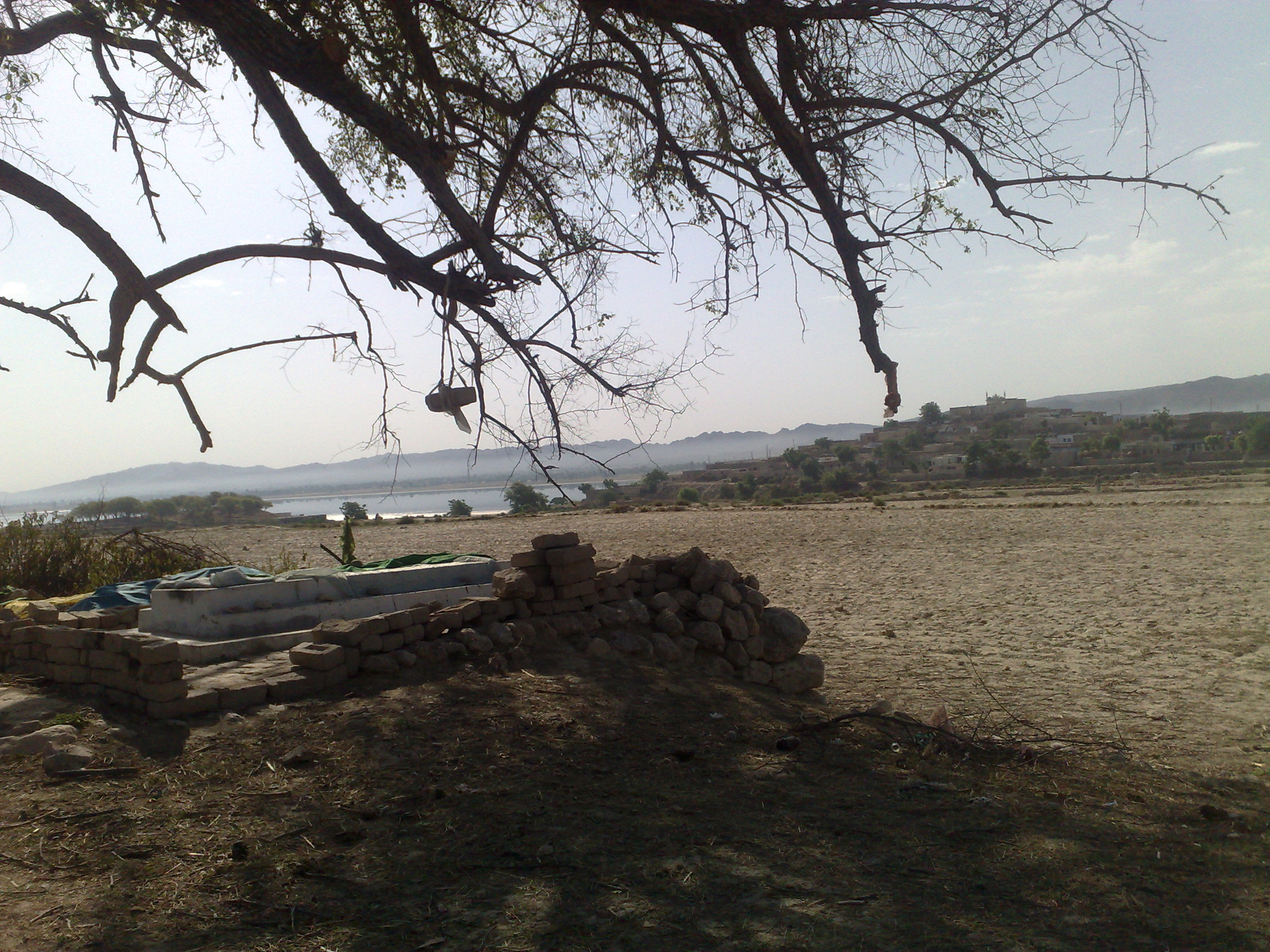
Chitta in the foreground of lake

Chitta is one of the 32 villages located in the Soon Sakesar Valley in Khushab District of Pakistan. The population is around 4000. It is located 220 km south-west of Islamabad. The village sits on footsteps of the highest peak of Soon valley; Sakesar and on the edge of the beautiful Uchali lake. The main towns near Chitta are Naushera, Talagang, Khushab and Sargodha.

The main source of income for the people of Chitta is cultivating crops, soldiering and animal herding. Wheat is the most common crop that is harvested though some people have also started harvesting vegetables such as potatoes and cabbage.

There is one middle school in the village and a government high school which is located roughly 500 meters from the main village. Much of the population have their homes built on an elevated part (which is known as "Dhairi" in the local language) with the Jamia Mosque on the peak of that elevation.
