= Achourya =

Non-stealing, a virtue in Indian religions

Achourya (Sanskrit: अचौर्यः, IAST: Acauryaḥ) or Asteya (Sanskrit: अस्तेय; IAST: Asteya) is the Sanskrit term for "non-stealing". Asteya is one of the five major vows of Hinduism and Jainism, mentioned explicitly in the Sarvārthasiddhi and the Yoga Sutras. It is one of ten forms of temperance (virtuous self-restraint) in Indian philosophy and one of the five vows in Jainism. The practice of asteya demands that one must not steal, nor have the intent to steal, another's property through action, speech, and thoughts.

== Etymology ==
The word "asteya" is a compound derived from Sanskrit, where "a" refers to "non-" and "steya" refers to "practice of stealing" or "something that can be stolen". Monier Monier-Williams' Sanskrit Dictionary defines asteya as "non-stealing", referring to its usage in the Manusmriti and the Yajnavalkya Smriti, which are part of the Dharmasastra tradition in Indian philosophy.

== Jainism ==
In Jainism, it is one of the five vows that all śrāvakas and śrāvikās (householders) as well as monastics must observe. The five transgressions of this vow, as mentioned in the Jain text Tattvārthsūtra, are: "Prompting another to steal, receiving stolen goods, underbuying in a disordered state, using false weights and measures, and deceiving others with artificial or imitation goods".

This is explained in the Jain text, Sarvārthasiddhi as (translated by S.A. Jain):

Prompting a person to steal, or prompting him through another or approving of the theft, is the first transgression. The second is receiving stolen goods from a person, whose action has neither been prompted nor approved by the recipient. Receiving or buying goods otherwise than by lawful and just means is an irregularity or a transgression. An attempt to buy precious things very cheaply in a disordered state is the third transgression. Cheating others by the use of false weights and measures in order to obtain more from others and give less to others, is the fourth transgression. Deceiving others with artificial gold, synthetic diamonds and so on, is the fifth transgression. These five are the transgressions of the vow of non-stealing.

— Sarvārthasiddhi (7–27)

== Hinduism ==
Asteya is defined in Hindu texts as "the abstinence, in one's deeds or words or thoughts, from unauthorized appropriation of things of value from another human being". It is a widely discussed virtue in ethical theories of Hinduism. For example, in the Yoga Sūtras (II.30), Asteya is listed as the third yama or virtue of self-restraint, along with ahimsa (nonviolence), satya (non-falsehoods, truthfulness), brahmacharya (sexual chastity in one's feelings and actions) and aparigraha (non-possessiveness, non-craving).

अहिंसासत्यास्तेय ब्रह्मचर्यापरिग्रहाः यमाः

Non-violence, Non-falsehood, Non-stealing, Non-cheating (celibacy, chastity), and Non-possessiveness are the five Yamas.

— Patañjali, Yoga Sutra 2.30

Asteya is thus one of the five essential restraints (yamas, "the don'ts") in Hinduism, that with five essential practices (niyamas, "the dos") are suggested for right, virtuous, enlightened living.

These yamas are mentioned by Shankaracharya, of the Advaita Vedanta school, in his Upadeshasahasri. The yamas are mentioned in the context of outlining the kind of conduct that a disciple seeking knowledge must have.

=== Discussion ===
Asteya in practice implies to "not steal", "not cheat", nor unethically manipulate other's property or others for one's own gain. Asteya as virtue demands not only that one "not steal", but that one should not encourage cheating through speech or writing, or want to cheat even in one's thinking. To steal or want to steal expresses lack of faith in oneself: one's ability to learn and create property. To steal another's property is also stealing from one's own potential ability to develop. The Sutras reason that misappropriation, conspiring to misappropriate, or wanting to misappropriate, at its root reflects the sin of lobha (bad greed), moha (material delusion), or krodha (bad anger). Commentators on the Yoga Sutras state that asteya is rooted in the virtue of ahimsa. One commentator notes that the virtue of ahimsa would be 'defiled' if virtues such as asteya were not cultivated.

Gandhi held ahimsa as essential to the human right to life and liberty without fear, and asteya as essential to the human right to property without fear. Asteya follows from ahimsa, in Gandhi's views, because stealing is a form of violence and injury to another person. Asteya is not merely "theft by action", but it includes "theft by intent" and "theft by manipulation". Persistent exploitation of the weak or poor is a form of "asteya in one's thought".

=== Related concepts ===
Dāna—charity to a deserving person without any expectation in return—is a recommended niyama in Hinduism. The motive behind dāna is reverse to that of "stealing from others". Dāna is a complementary practice to the yama (restraint) of asteya.

== Difference from aparigraha ==
Asteya and aparigraha are two of several important virtues in Hinduism and Jainism. They both involve interaction between a person and material world, either as property, fame or ideas; yet asteya and aparigraha are different concepts. Asteya is the virtue of non-stealing and not wanting to appropriate, or take by force or deceit or exploitation, by deeds or words or thoughts, what is owned by and belongs to someone else. Aparigraha, in contrast, is the virtue of non-possessiveness and non-clinging to one's own property, non-accepting of any gifts or particularly improper gifts offered by others, and of non-avarice/non-craving in the motivation of one's deeds, words, and thoughts.

Aparigraha means non-covetousness. Graham is where one stands. Pari is the limit. When one crosses the limit of one's graha, even by intention it's covetousness, not a virtue. It's misappropriation or manipulation. This principle applies not only to physical property, but also to intellectual property. Crossing one's limit, craving for something or someone rightfully belonging to others even by thoughts or intentions is a sin.

== Sources ==
- Jain, Prof. S.A. (1992) [First edition 1960], Reality (English Translation of Srimat Pujyapadacharya's Sarvarthasiddhi) (Second ed.), Jwalamalini Trust, " This article incorporates text from this source, which is in the public domain."
- Sangave, Vilas Adinath (1980), Jain Community: A Social Survey (2nd ed.), Bombay: Popular Prakashan, ISBN 978-0-317-12346-3
