= Dhrti =

Yama (ethical rule) in Hinduism

- Samkhya: Kapila
- Yoga: Patanjali
- Vaisheshika: Kaṇāda, Prashastapada
- Secular: Valluvar

Dhṛti or Dhriti or Dhruti (Sanskrit: धृति), means to 'act with determination', 'patience', 'firmness', and refers to 'perseverance', 'wearing regularly'.

Dhruti, meaning 'fortitude' and 'determination', is defined as the subtle faculty in a person that makes them strive continuously towards a goal. Dhruti is a quality of peace, courage, patience, enthusiasm, and perseverance to face and overcome all odds and obstacles.

Dhrti is one of the yamas, one of the eleven Rudrāṇīs. There is no correct equivalent English word for dhrti which is derived from dhr- meaning 'to bear'. Dhriti was reborn as Madri in the Mahabharata.

Lakshmi is referred to the epithet of Dhruti or Dhriti in the Lakshmi Sahasranama to describe her quality of courage and light.

The name Dhriti also appears in the Lalita Sahasranama.

== Vedic relevance ==
Dhrti is the name of a Vedic metre of the type 12.12.8|12.8|12.8., and is a variety of the atichandas. It is also the name of a yoga in the Hindu Calendar. The Vedic Rishis address their prayers to the Visvedevas just as they do the Adityas and the Maruts; who all as a group are the protectors of the ten Rtas including Dhrti ('forbearance') which word represents an abstract idea like Hri and Kirti.

As part of the performance of the Ashvamedha yajna, as mentioned in the Shatapatha Brahmana, Asvalayana-srauta-sutra, and Sankhayana-srauta-sutra, the Adhvaryu offered, for the safe movement of the Sacrificial Horse during day-time, three Istis daily to Savitr and at nightfall performed four Dhrti Homas for the safe sheltering of that horse during night-time. While the Dhrti Homas were in progress, a Rajanya (Kshatriya) lute-player (veenagathi) sang three songs (Gatha) made up of many verses in which he praised the royal-sacrificer with the mention of his heroic exploits, viz., the wars he waged, the battles he won, the conquests he made, so on.

== Puranic relevance ==
The Purana Index lists Dhrti, borne by Vijaya, as one of the sons of Dharma who was the son of Brahma, and who married all thirteen daughters of Daksha, each of whom bore Dhrti a son. Dhrtavarta was the son of Dhrti and father of Satyakarma. Nandi was a consort of Dhrti. Niyama was a son of Dhrti. And, Dhrti ('courage') is invoked in the Grahabalis.

In the Stuti of Devi Bhagavatam (V.22.25-42), Devi, who is the Energy for the creation and destruction of the universe, has been praised as having many names and as residing in all in the form of shakti ('power and energy'), amrti ('memory'), dhrti ('steadfastness'), buddhi ('intelligence'), so on.

== Implication ==
Dhrti meaning 'fortitude' and 'determination' is defined as the subtle faculty in man that makes him strive continuously towards a goal. It provides courage, enthusiasm and perseverance to face and overcome all odds and obstacles. With regard to the three types of Dhrtis mentioned in the Bhagavad Gita, Swami Tejomayananda states that Sattvic dhrti is the unswerving fortitude with which one works for a noble cause with enthusiasm and dedication, despite obstacles; Rajasic dhrti is the fortitude displayed for a while, in a part, place or under particular circumstances to achieve particular goals and may dissolve under different circumstances and situations, and Tamasic dhrti is the stubbornness with which one holds on to the false.

Sri Sri Ravi Shankar suggests the three gunas that is determination, similar to dhrti; "The ambition (rajastic) keeps the faith alive. Satvic faith is innocence and is born out of fullness of consciousness." Tamasic faith is due to dullness, complacent that only God will take care of all these things. If there is no faith, there is fear. "In Gyana (state of wisdom) there is alertness without tension [or fear] and faith without complacency." To be one who possesses the higher spiritual knowledge.

The two factors that supply the fuel and the motive force in all sustained endeavours are - buddhi ('understanding') and dhrti ('fortitude'), the former is 'the intellectual capacity to grasp what is happening' and the latter is 'the constancy of purpose and self-application'. Abhinavagupta states that since everyone works therefore, everyone possesses dhrti; he holds buddhi to mean 'resolution' and dhrti to mean 'satisfaction'.

In Hinduism, four things viz. Śruti and Smriti which are society’s codes of ethics, sadacara which is good noble conduct accepted by society; and svasya ca priyam atmanah which is one’s own joy and pleasure, determine Dharma. The sanatana dharma is the eternal universal values to be followed by all people in life, and varnasrama dharma consists of specific duties given to each individual; Dharma means that holds everyone and everything together which leads to material prosperity and spiritual realization in this life itself. According to Manu, Dhrti is one of the ten values necessary for all people at all times that characterize Dharma. Dhrti means fortitude; it means the capacity to hold on to something. It is the sattavic dhrti which is strength, force and ability that makes us hold on to noble values of life.

Sattavic dhrti and Sattvic buddhi are mutually related terms. Krishna explains to Arjuna (Bhagavad Gita Sl. XVIII.30):

प्रवृति च निवृति च कार्याकार्ये भयाभये |
बन्धं मोक्षं च या वेत्ति बुद्धिः सा पार्थ सात्त्विकी ||

Meaning; "That which knows the paths of work and renunciation, what ought to be done and what not to be done, fear and fearlessness, bondage and liberation, that 'understanding' is sattvic ('pure')." In the Bhagavad Gita the nature of Sattvic reasoning, Rajasic reasoning and Tamasic reasoning is described this way, as paths of work and renunciation. Which means the function of the intellect is discrimination, the faculty of 'right understanding ' (buddhi) which gives real joy, success and prosperity. With regard to sattvic dhrti he states (Bhagavad Gita l. XVIII.33):

धृत्या यया धारयते मनः प्राणेन्द्रियकिर्याः |
योगेनव्यभिचरिण्या धृतिः सा पार्थ सात्त्विकी ||

The unwavering 'fortitude' by which through Yoga, the functions of the mind, the Prana and the senses are restrained, that 'fortitude', is sattvic ('pure'). In this context Sankara in his Bhasya on the Bhagavad Gita explains that 'action' (way of works) is movement leading to bondage and 'inaction' (renunciation) leads to liberation. The remote expression – unwavering or unfaltering or unbroken concentration, should be related to resolve or dhrti; the sense is that the functions of the mind and so forth, maintained through unfaltering resolve, are in fact maintained through concentration.

== Yogic relevance ==
Patanjali’s Yoga Sutra II.28 reads:-

योगाङगानुष्ठानादशुध्दिक्षये ज्ञानदीप्तिराविवेकख्यातेः |

"From the consistent practice of the parts of the Yoga-process, on the elimination of the impurity, the radiant organ of perception becomes manifest, until there is a steady discriminative insight."

This means – as impurities are eliminated through the observance of the steps of yoga, a gradual kindling of knowledge occurs up to the full illumination of discriminatory wisdom. Discriminatory wisdom as virtue is the cause of happiness, and both, Vyasa and Vijnanabhikshu in their commentaries list nine causes including as the ninth cause Dhrti here meaning sustenance; and agree that the yoga-angas eradicate the impurity in both tangible (drshta) and intangible (adrshta) ways i.e. the physical practices such as purification (shaucha), and through japa. Elimination means disappearance of the veil on the sattva mind-field. The body is the sustainer of the senses being their resort but the senses sustain the body by way of providing spiritual and material welfare. The gross elements are the sustainers of the body and also sustain each other; the diverse sub-human, human and celestial bodies are mutually the sustainers and the sustained. Dhrti also means patience, remaining true to duty (dharmas - religious duties, moral rights and duties) even in calamities, and perfection in maintaining wisdom.

== Vaishno relevance ==
Verse II.vi.145 of Sri Bhakti-rasamrta-sindhu states – the steadiness of heart arising from attaining realization of the Lord, from absence of suffering in attaining the realization of the Lord, and from realizing prema with the Lord is called dhrti; in this state there is no lamentation for things not attained or for things that have disappeared. Ksama ('tolerance') is included in dhrti-bhava. The three types of rati ('relationship of love', 'attraction') are priti ('affection'), sakhya ('friendship') and vatsalya, dhrti along with vitarka ('conjecture'), mati ('scriptural conclusion'), nirveda ('self-disgust'), smrti ('remembrance'), harsa ('joy'), and the type of bodha arising from destruction of ignorance become somewhat causes of rati.
