= Satya =

Sanskrit word and a virtue in Indian religions

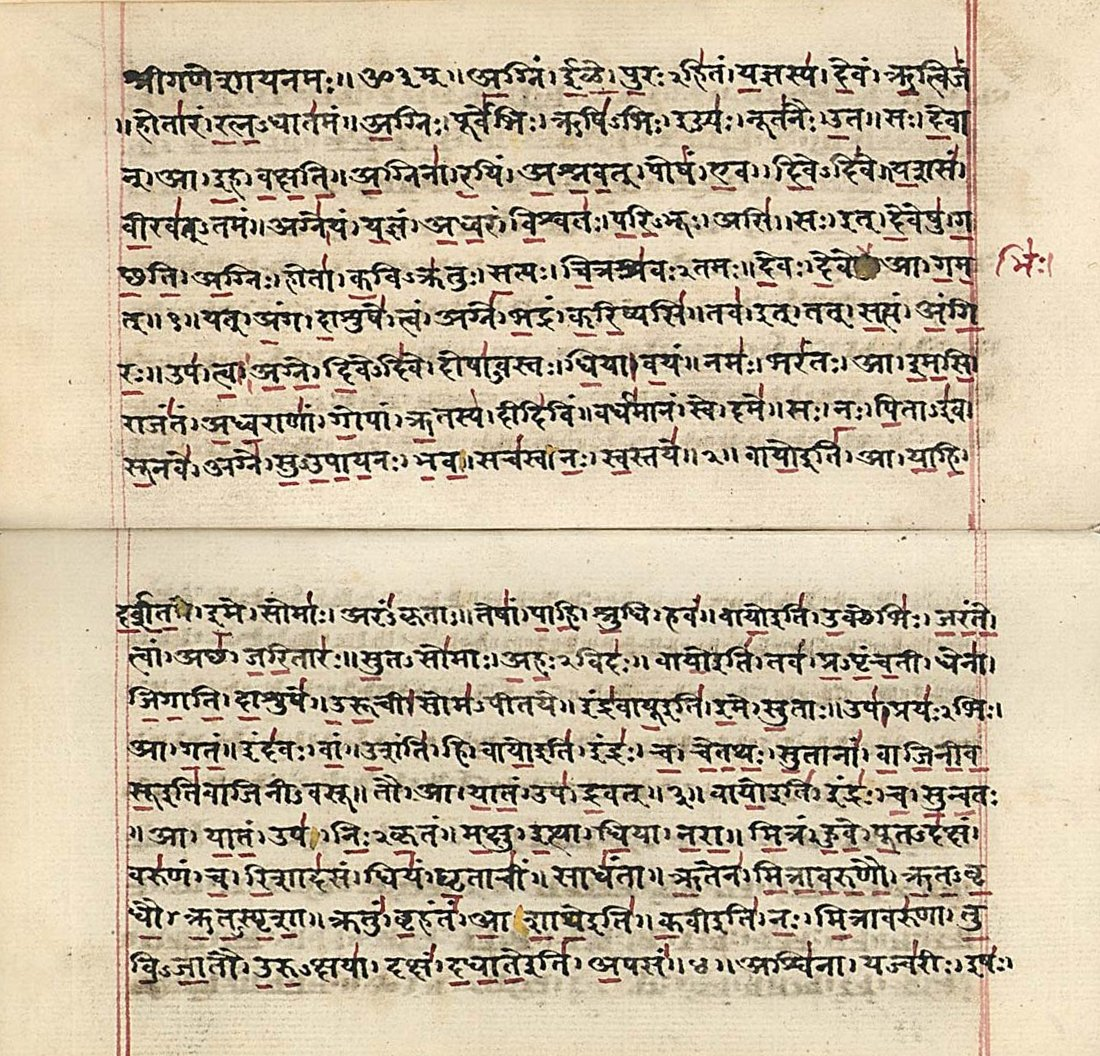
Satya is an important concept and virtue in Indian religions. Rigveda, dated to be from the 2nd millennium BCE, offers the earliest discussion of Satya. It appears in the fifth and sixth lines in this Rigveda manuscript image.

Satya (Sanskrit: सत्य; IAST: Satya) is a Sanskrit word, usually translated as "truth" or "essence". Across Indian religions, satya is a deeply valued virtue, signifying the alignment of one's thoughts, speech, and actions with reality. In Yoga philosophy, particularly in Patañjali's Yoga Sutras, Satya is one of the five yamas—moral restraints designed to cultivate truthfulness and prevent the distortion of reality through one’s expressions and behavior. Satya is also one of the five śrāvaka virtues in Jainism.

== Etymology and meaning ==
Satya has cognates in a number of diverse Indo-European languages, including the words "sooth" and "sin" in English, "suť" ("суть") in Russian, "sand" (truthful) in Danish, "sann" in Swedish, and "haithya" in Avestan, the liturgical language of Zoroastrianism.

In the Vedas and later sutras, the meaning of the word satya evolved into an ethical concept about truthfulness. It means being true and consistent with reality in one's thought, speech, and action.

=== Sat ===
Sat (Sanskrit: सत्) is the root of many Sanskrit words and concepts such as sattva ("pure, truthful") and satya ("truth"). The Sanskrit root sat has several meanings or translations:

1. "Absolute reality"
2. "Fact"
3. "Brahman" (not to be confused with Brahmin)
4. "that which is unchangeable"
5. "that which has no distortion"
6. "that which is beyond distinctions of time, space, and person"
7. "that which pervades the universe in all its constancy"

Sat is a common prefix in ancient Indian literature. It implies variously that which is good, true, genuine, virtuous, being, happening, real, existing, enduring, lasting, or essential. For example, sat-sastra means true doctrine, sat-van means one devoted to the truth. In ancient texts, fusion words based on Sat refer to "Universal Spirit, Universal Principle, Being, Soul of the World, Brahman".

The negation of sat is asat, meaning delusion, distorted, untrue, the fleeting impression that is incorrect, invalid, and false. The concepts of sat and asat are famously expressed in the Pavamana Mantra found in the Bṛhadāraṇyaka Upaniṣad (1.3.28):

Asato mā sad gamaya
tamaso mā jyotir gamaya
mṛtyor mā amṛtam gamaya

Translation:

Lead me from delusion to truth
from darkness to light
from mortality to immortality

Sat is one of the three characteristics of Brahman as described in sat-chit-ananda. This association between sat, 'truth', and Brahman, ultimate reality, is also expressed in Hindu cosmology, wherein Satyaloka, the highest heaven of Hindu cosmology, is the abode of Brahman.

== Hinduism ==
=== Vedic literature ===
Satya is a central theme in the Vedas. It is equated with and considered necessary to the concept of Ṛta (ऋतं, ṛtaṃ)—that which is properly joined, order, rule, nature, balance and harmony. Ṛta results from satya in the Vedas, as it regulates and enables the operation of the universe and everything within it. Satya is considered essential, and without it, the universe and reality falls apart and cannot function.

In the Rigveda, rita and satya are opposed to anrita and asatya (falsehood). Truth and truthfulness is considered as a form of reverence for the divine, while falsehood a form of sin. Satya includes action and speech that is factual, real, true, and reverent to Ṛta in Books 1, 4, 6, 7, 9, and 10 of Rigveda. In the Vedas, satya includes current, future, and past contexts. De Nicolás states, that in Rigveda, "Satya is the modality of acting in the world of Sat, as the truth to be built, formed or established".

=== Upanishads ===
Satya is widely discussed in various Upanishads, including the Brihadaranyaka Upanishad where satya is called the means to Brahman, as well as Brahman (Being, true self). In hymn 1.4.14 of Brihadaranyaka Upanishad, Satya (truth) is equated to Dharma (morality, ethics, law of righteousness), as

Nothing is higher than the Law of Righteousness (Dharma). The weak overcomes the stronger by the Law of Righteousness. Truly that Law is the Truth (Satya); Therefore, when a man speaks the Truth, they say, "He speaks Righteousness"; and if he speaks Righteousness, they say, "He speaks the Truth!" For both are one.

— Brihadaranyaka Upanishad, I.4.xiv

Taittiriya Upanishad's hymn 11.11 states, "Speak the Satya (truth), conduct yourself according to the Dharma (morality, ethics, law)".

The hymns of Upanishads portray truth as ultimately always prevailing. The Mundaka Upanishad, for example, states in Book 3, Chapter 1,

सत्यमेव जयते नानृतं
Translation 1: Truth alone triumphs, not falsehood.
Translation 2: Truth ultimately triumphs, not falsehood.
Translation 3: The true prevails, not the untrue.

— Mundaka Upanishad, 3.1.6

Sandilya Upanishad of Atharvaveda, in Chapter 1, includes ten forbearances as virtues, in its exposition of Yoga. It defines satya as "the speaking of the truth that conduces to the well being of creatures, through the actions of one's mind, speech, or body."

Deussen states that satya is described in the major Upanishads with two layers of meanings—one as empirical truth about reality and another as abstract truth about universal principle, being, and the unchanging. Both of these ideas are explained in early Upanishads, composed before 500 BCE, by variously breaking the word satya or satyam into two or three syllables. In later Upanishads, the ideas evolve and transcend into satya as truth (or truthfulness), and Brahman as the Being, Be-ness, real Self, the eternal.

=== Epics ===
The Shanti Parva of the Mahabharata states, "The righteous hold that forgiveness, truth, sincerity, and compassion are the foremost (of all virtues). Truth is the essence of the Vedas."

The Epic repeatedly emphasizes that satya is a basic virtue, because everything and everyone depends on and relies on satya.

सत्यस्य वचनं साधु न सत्याद विद्यते परम
सत्येन विधृतं सर्वं सर्वं सत्ये परतिष्ठितम
अपि पापकृतॊ रौद्राः सत्यं कृत्वा पृथक पृथक
अद्रॊहम अविसंवादं परवर्तन्ते तदाश्रयाः
ते चेन मिथॊ ऽधृतिं कुर्युर विनश्येयुर असंशयम

— The Mahabharata, Chapter CCLIX: Shanti Parva
Translation:

To speak the truth is meritorious. There is nothing higher than truth. Everything is upheld by truth, and everything rests upon truth. Even the sinful and ferocious, swear to keep the truth amongst themselves, dismiss all grounds of quarrel and uniting with one another set themselves to their (sinful) tasks, depending upon truth. If they behaved falsely towards one another, they would then be destroyed without doubt.

=== Yoga Sutras ===
In the Yoga Sutras of Patanjali, it is written, “When one is firmly established in speaking truth, the fruits of action become subservient to him." In Yoga sutra, satya is one of the five yamas, or virtuous restraints, along with ahimsa (restraint from violence or injury to any living being); asteya (restraint from stealing); brahmacharya (celibacy or restraint from sexually cheating on one's partner); and aparigraha (restraint from covetousness and craving). Patanjali considers satya as a restraint from falsehood in one's action (body), words (speech, writing), or feelings / thoughts (mind). In Patanjali's teachings, one may not always know the truth or the whole truth, but one knows if one is creating, sustaining, or expressing falsehood, exaggeration, distortion, fabrication, or deception. Satya is, in Patanjali's Yoga, the virtue of restraint from such falsehood, either through silence or through stating the truth without any form of distortion.

== Jainism ==
Satya is one of the five vows prescribed in Jain Agamas. Satya was also preached by Mahavira. According to Jainism, the underlying cause of falsehood is passion and therefore, it is said to cause hiṃsā (injury).

According to the Jain text Sarvārthasiddhi: "That which causes pain and suffering to the living is not commendable, whether it refers to actual facts or not".

According to the Jain text Puruşārthasiddhyupāya:

All these subdivisions (injury, falsehood, stealing, unchastity, and attachment) are hiṃsā as indulgence in these sullies the pure nature of the soul. Falsehood etc. have been mentioned separately only to make the disciple understand through illustrations.

— Puruşārthasiddhyupāya (42)

== Buddhism ==
The term satya (Pali: sacca) is translated into English as "reality" or "truth." In terms of the Four Noble Truths (ariyasacca), the Pali can be written as sacca, tatha, anannatatha, and dhamma.

'The Four Noble Truths' (ariya-sacca) are the briefest synthesis of the entire teaching of Buddhism, since all those manifold doctrines of the threefold Pali canon are, without any exception, included therein. They are the truth of suffering (mundane mental and physical phenomenon), of the origin of suffering (tanha, craving), of the extinction of suffering (Nibbana or nirvana), and of the Noble Eightfold Path leading to the extinction of suffering (the eight supra-mundane mind factors).

== Sikhism ==
Sat or truthfulness is one of the five virtues in Sikhism:

The Gurmukhs do not like falsehood; they are imbued with Truth; they love only Truth.

— Gurubani, Hymn 3,

== Indian emblem motto ==
National Emblem of India

The motto of the republic of India's emblem is Satyameva Jayate which is literally translated as 'Truth alone triumphs'.

== See also ==
- Dharma – Key concept in Indian philosophy and Eastern religions, with multiple meanings
- Rta – Vedic principle of universal nature order
- Sacca
- Satnam – Term in Sikhism
- Satyaloka – Abode of the Hindu god Brahma
- Satya Yuga – First of four yugas (ages) in Hindu cosmology
- Transcendentals – Truth, beauty, and goodness
- Truth – Conformity to reality
- Haqiqa – One of "the four stages" in Sufism
