= Gurunath =

Spiritual title given to a householder Nath Guru

Gurunath is a commonly used term when praising what is considered by devotees the ultimate source of compassion, love and truth - irrespective of sectarian divides whether they may be devotees of Shiva, the Lord of Transformation in the Hindu pantheon (Shaivaite) or of Vishnu, the Lord of Preservation and Sustenance in the Hindu pantheon (Vaishnav) or any other devotee (bhakta) of a Hindu God or Goddess.

The first part of the refrain "Bolo Sri Sat Gurunath Maharaj ki" is chanted by the leader of the kirtan, bhajan, devotional chanting of religious scriptures or highly devotional compositions made by individuals respectively, or devotional discourse. Then the congregation responds in unison with "Jai!". This refrain, which is normally chanted at the end of a bhajan or kirtan, may be translated from Sanskrit as "Say/Chant/Proclaim ("Bolo") the name of the Spiritual Mentor who is the essence of Truth ("Sri Sat Guru") who is Lord ("Nath") and King ("Maharaj")..."Yes!""

== Spiritual title ==
Gurunath is also a spiritual title given to a householder Nath Guru by Shri Gurudev Mahendranath, who wrote that he had coined the term in 1986: "So I have coined a word—Gurunath ... This word can be the Western term for the same thing as Gurudev and it circumvents any religious or Eastern connections." Shri Gurudev Mahendranath bestowed this title on at least two members of his lineage, Shri Gurunath Lokanath (1986) and Shri Gurunath Kapilnath (1989).

== Name ==
Gurunath is a family name and a given name for males in India and Bangladesh. Some notable persons named Gurunath include:

- Gurunath Aabaji Kulkarni (1923–1987) - a short story writer in Marathi
- Gurunath Sengupta (1848–1914) - a Sanskrit scholar and writer from Bangladesh
- Gurunath Vidyanidhi (1862–1931) - a Sanskrit scholar, writer and poet from Bangladesh

== See also ==
- Lineage
  - Guru
  - Guru–shishya tradition
  - Parampara
  - Sampradaya
  - Lineage (Buddhism)
  - List of Hindu gurus
- Lifestyle
  - Akhara
  - Apprenticeship
  - Chillum
  - Darshan
  - Gurukula
  - Kaupinam
  - Kacchera
  - Langota
- Others
  - Aghori
  - Charismatic authority
  - Godman
  - Guru Gita
  - Hindu reform movements
  - Lama
  - Lifestyle guru
  - Nath
  - Religious conversion
  - Shramana
  - Sikh gurus
  - Sifu
  - Sensei
