= Ashram =

Hindu spiritual hermitage or monastery

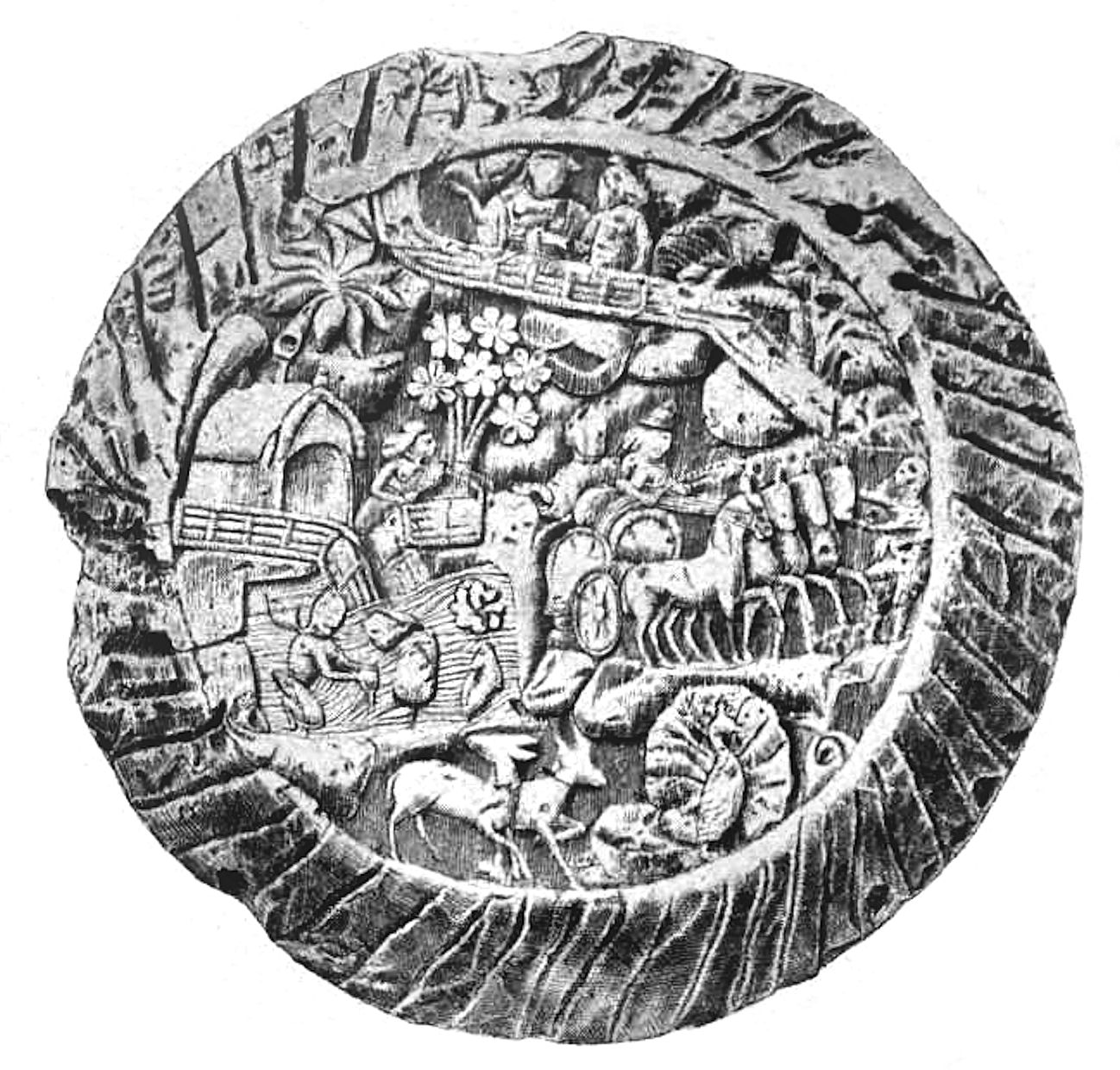
Ashram of sage Kanva depicted on terracotta plaque, 2nd century BCE

An ashram (Sanskrit: आश्रम, āśrama) is a spiritual hermitage or a monastery in Hinduism. Ashrams also exist among Christians in the indigenous Malankara churches (Orthodox, Catholic and Marthoma) of India in specific religious orders that combine elements of Hindu asceticism with Christianity.

== Etymology ==
The Sanskrit noun āśrama- is a thematic nominal derivative from the root śram 'toil' (श्रम्, from Proto-Indo-European *ḱremh₂, compare śramaṇa श्रमण) with the prefix ā 'towards'. An ashram is a place where one strives towards a goal in a disciplined manner. Such a goal could be ascetic, spiritual, yogic or otherwise.

== Overview ==
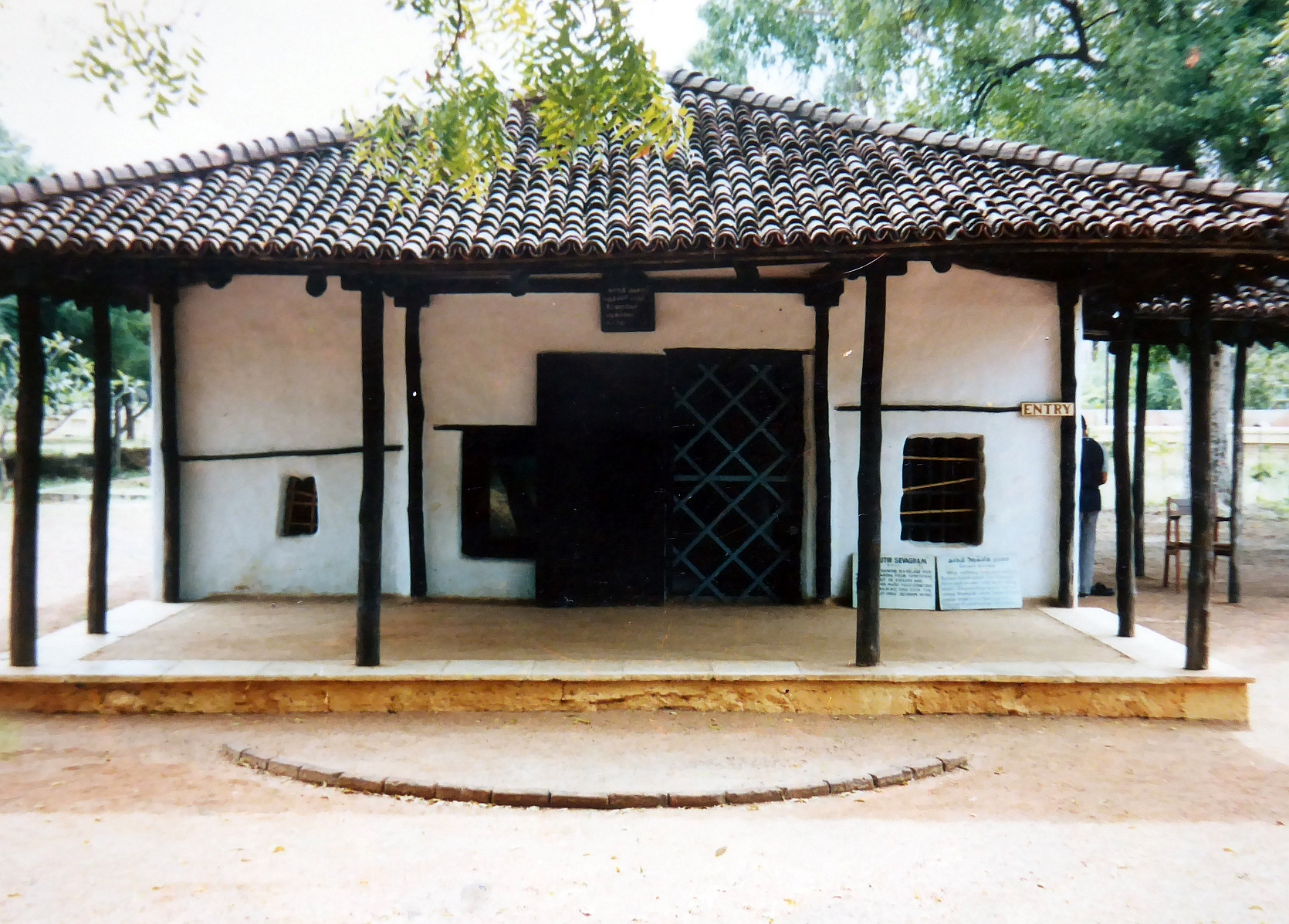
Sevagram Ashram in Sabramati, 1936

Traditionally, ashrams would be located far from human habitation in forests or mountainous, "refuges set off from worldly life." The residents of an ashram, often Brahmins, regularly performed spiritual and physical exercises of renunciation. Other sacrifices and penances, such as yajnas, were also performed. Many ashrams also served as gurukulas, residential schools for children under the guru-shishya tradition.

Sometimes, the goal of a pilgrimage to the ashram was not tranquility, but instruction in some art, especially warfare. In the Ramayana, the princes of ancient Ayodhya, Rama, and Lakshmana, go to Vishvamitra's ashram to protect his yajnas from being defiled by emissary-demons of Ravana. After they prove their mettle, the princes receive martial instruction from the sage, especially in the use of divine weapons. In the Mahabharata, the Kaurava and Pandava princes receive weapons instructions from Drona at his ashram.

Ion contemporary times, ashrams may admit other castes or be located in more populated areas.

== Schools in Maharashtra ==
Boarding schools, especially in the tribal areas of Maharashtra and elsewhere in India, are called ashram shala or ashram schools. One such school is the Lok Biradari Prakalp Ashram Shala.

== In the West ==
A number of ashrams have been established outside India. Typically, these ashrams are connected to Indian lineages, focus on imparting Yoga-related teachings, often in residential retreats, and are headed by spiritual teachers of Indian or Western background.

== Gallery ==
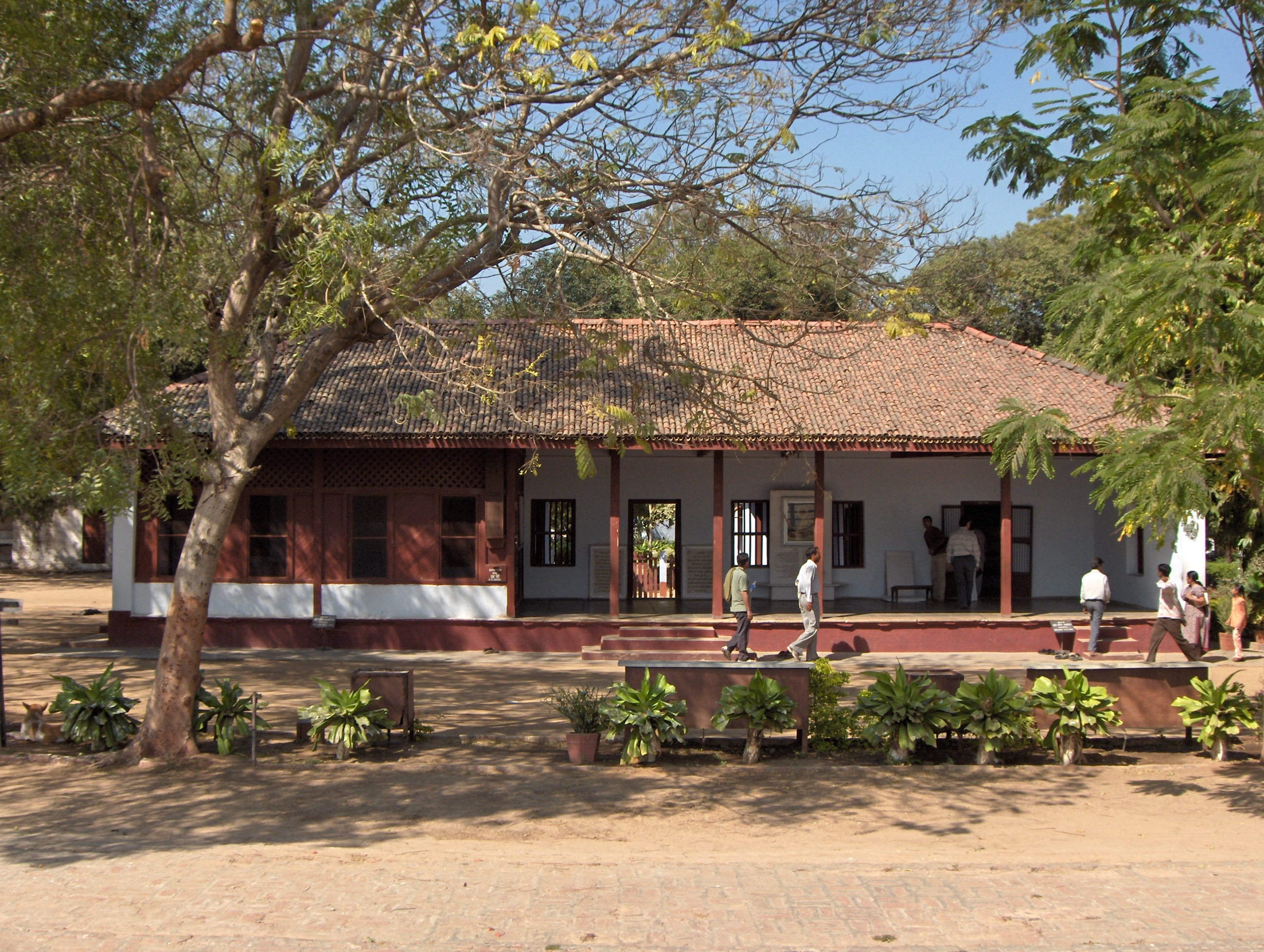
Sabarmati Ashram, where Mahatma Gandhi stayed

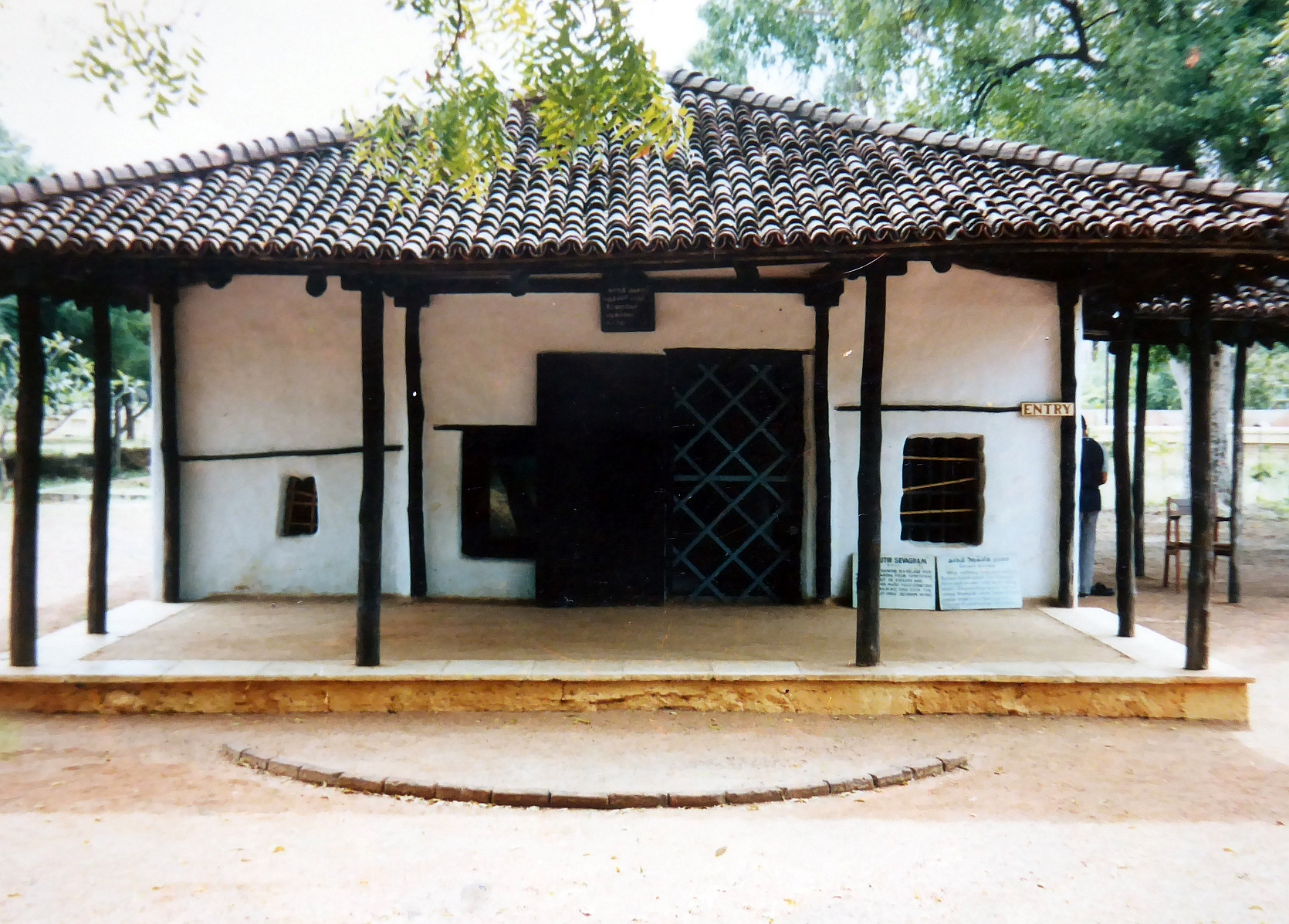
Sevagram Ashram

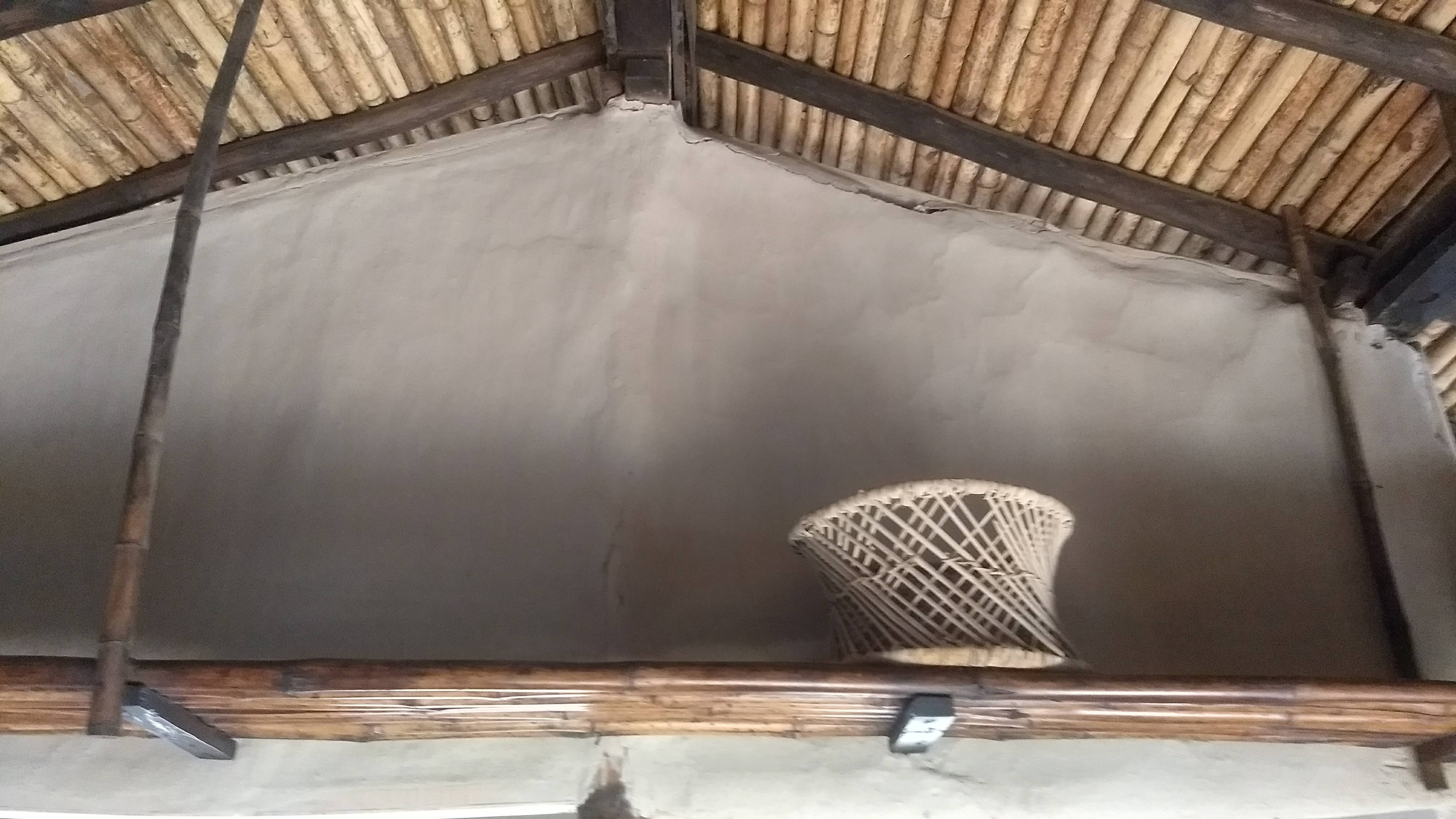
Ashram with folk architectural elements with wood and bamboo roof

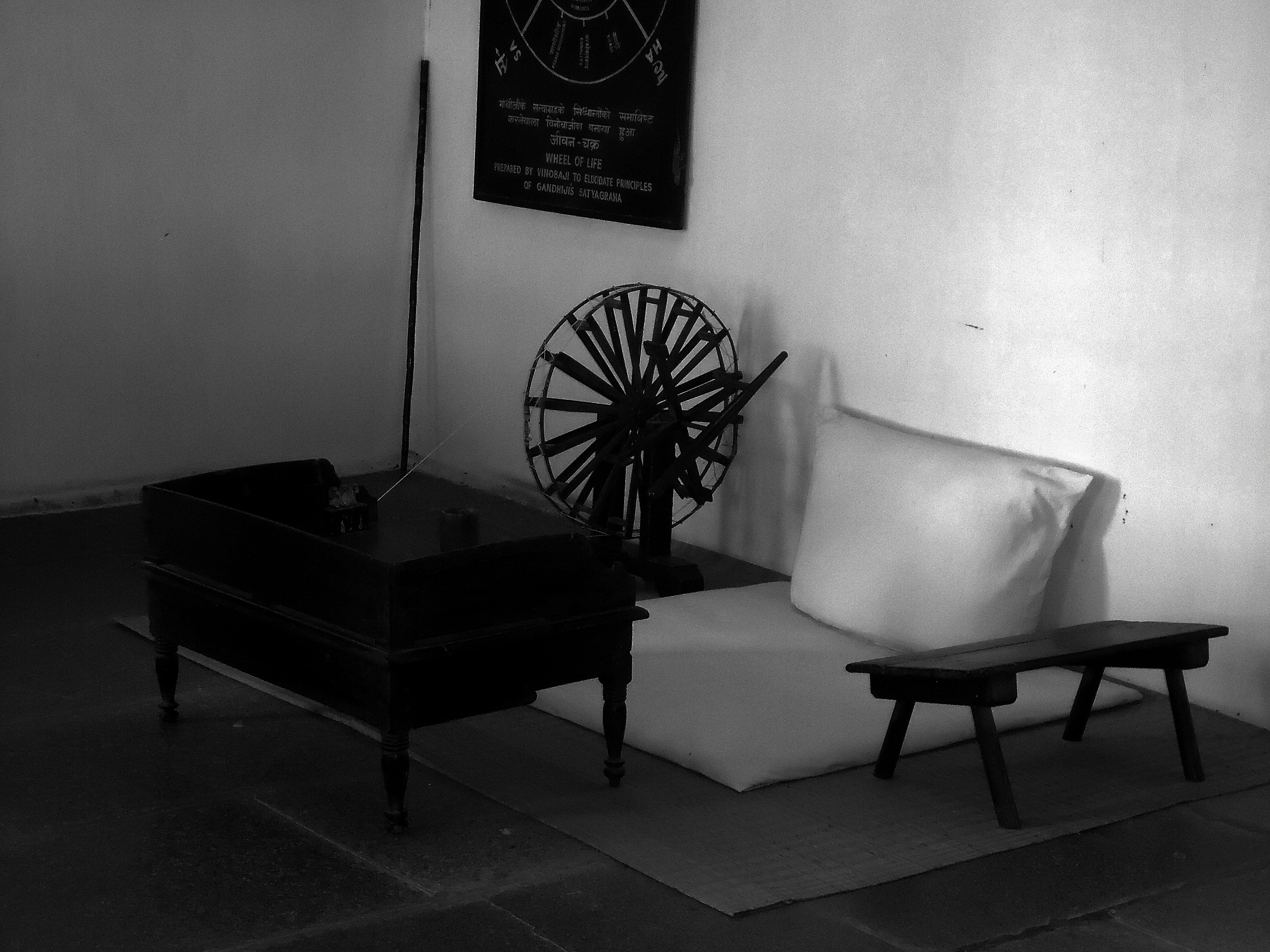
Arshram in Sabarmati

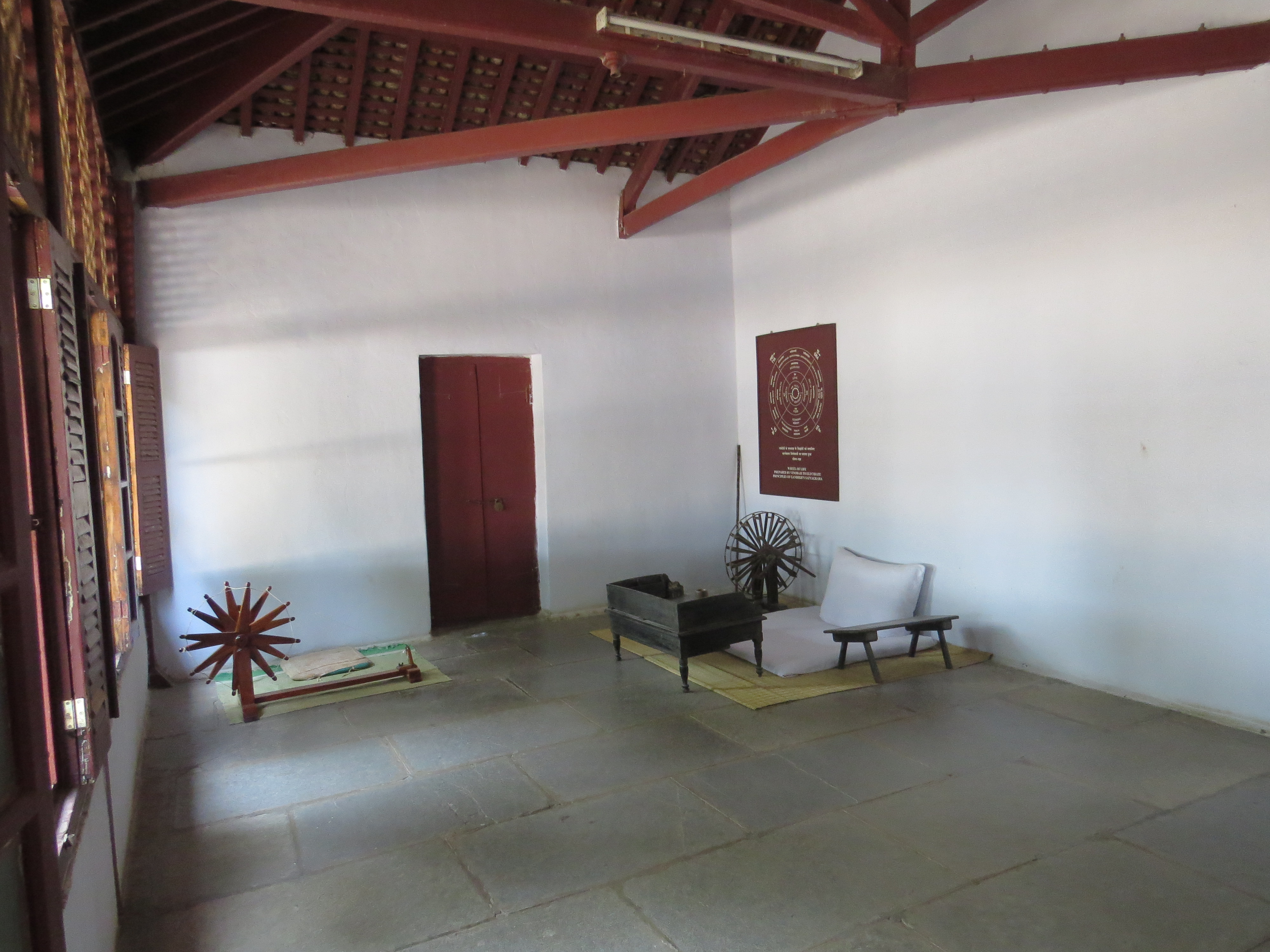
Sabarmati Ashram with folk architectural elements; stone floors and wood and lime-plaster walls

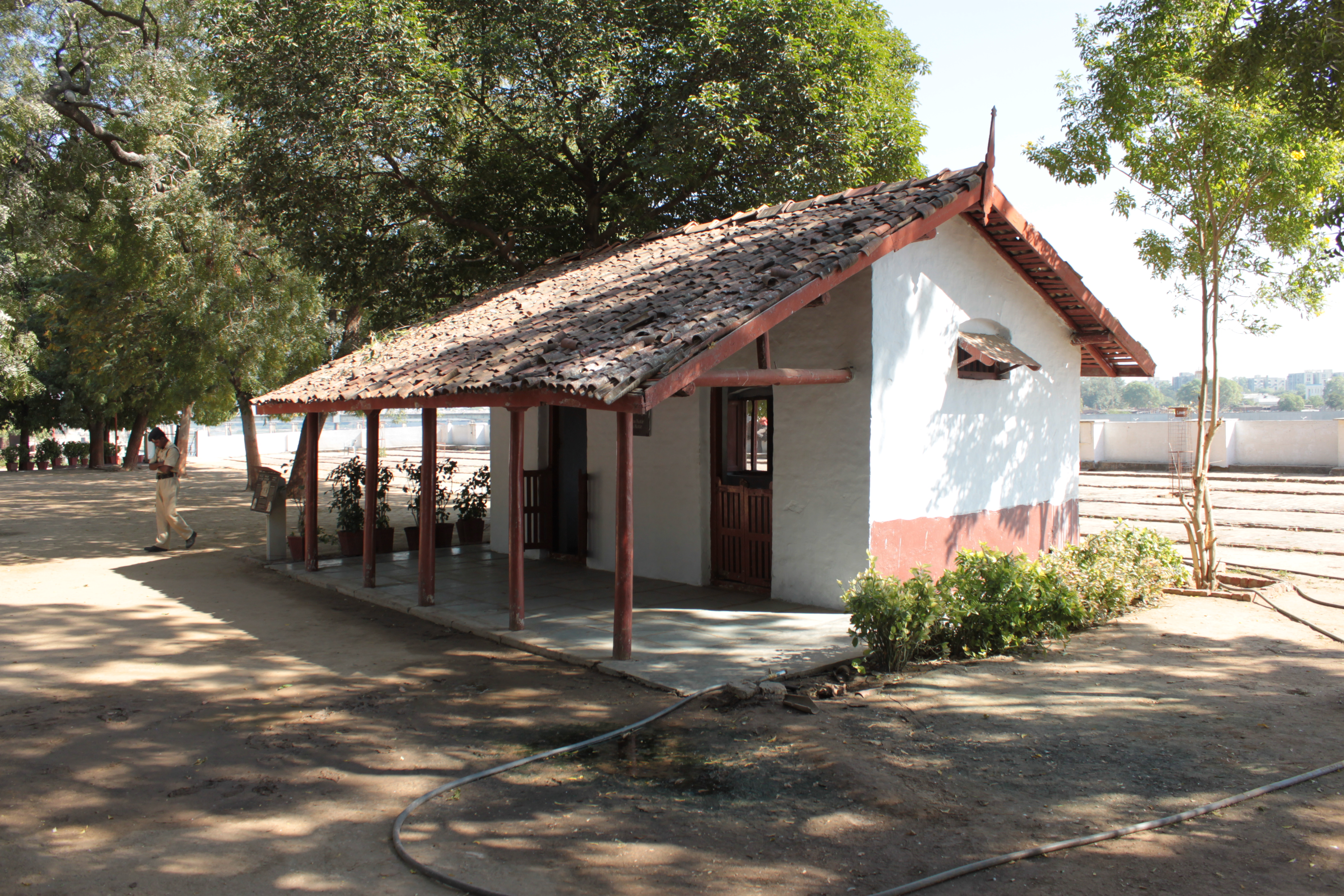
Small ashram hut in Sabramati

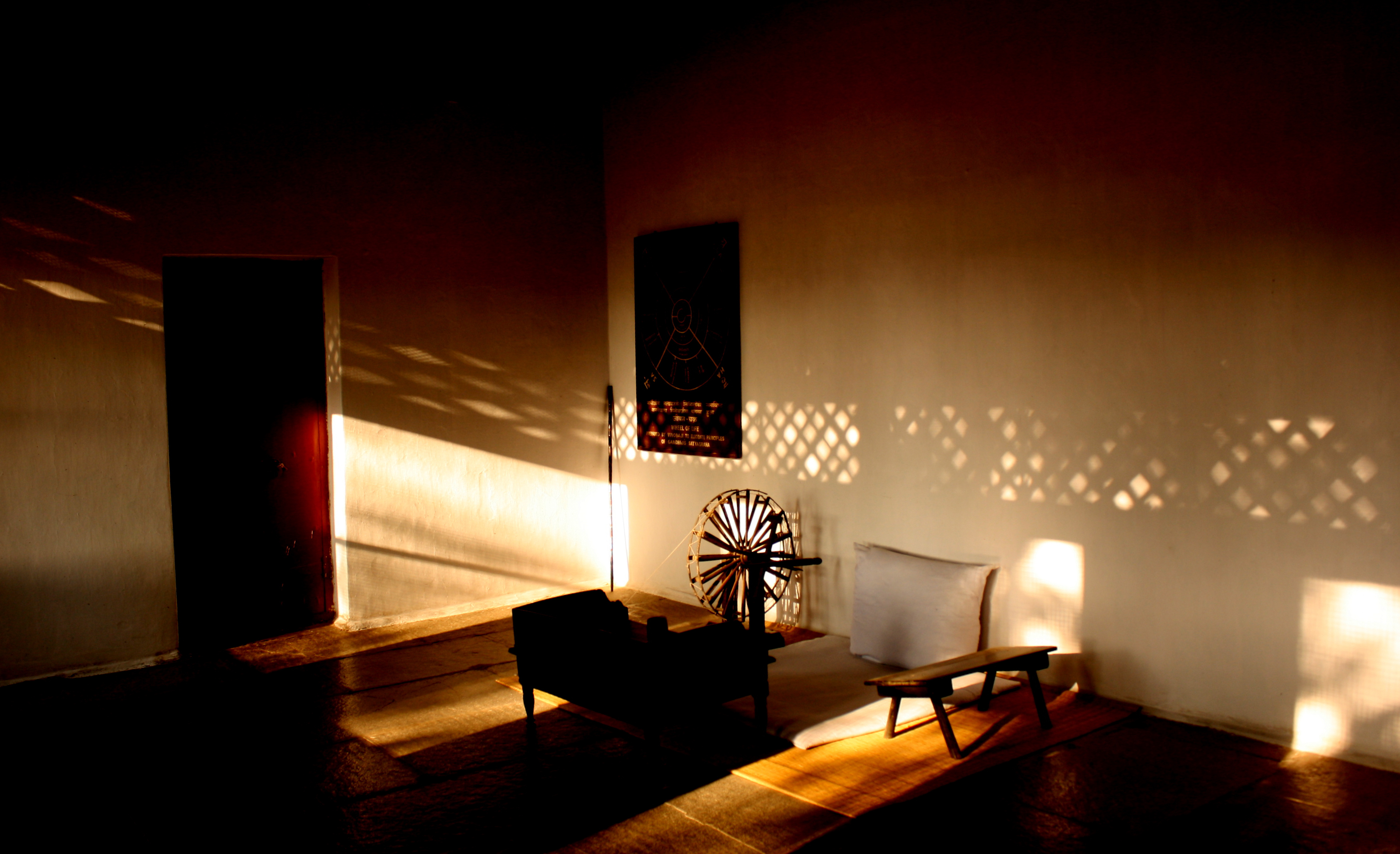
Ashram at Sabramati with verandha

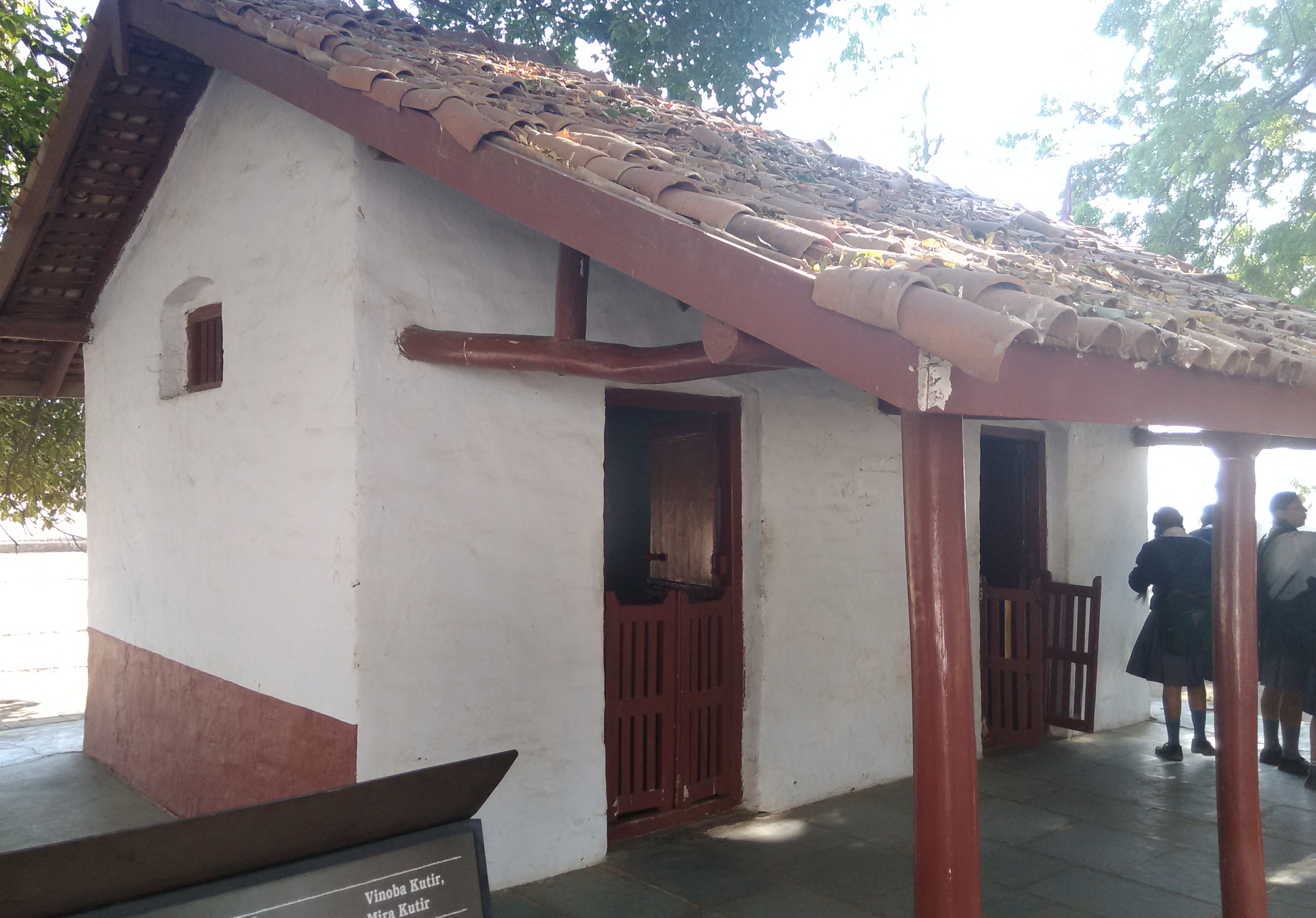
Acharjya Binoba Bhabe's kutira at Sabaramati

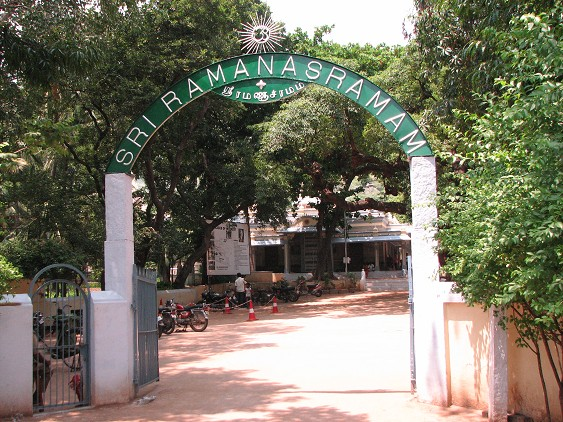
Sri Ramana Ashram, Tiruvannamalai, Tamil Nadu, established 1922

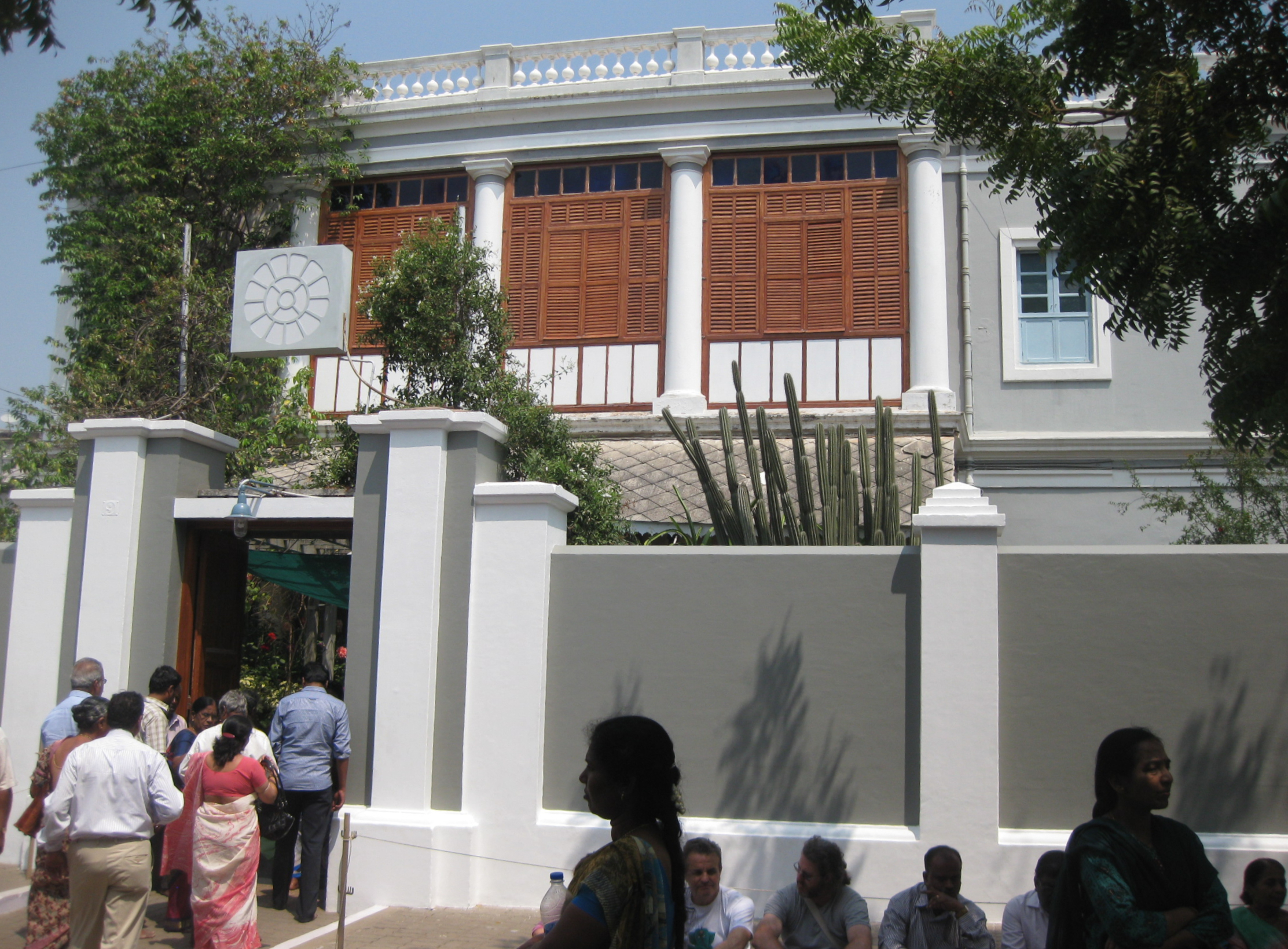
Sri Aurobindo Ashram in Pondicherry, established in 1926

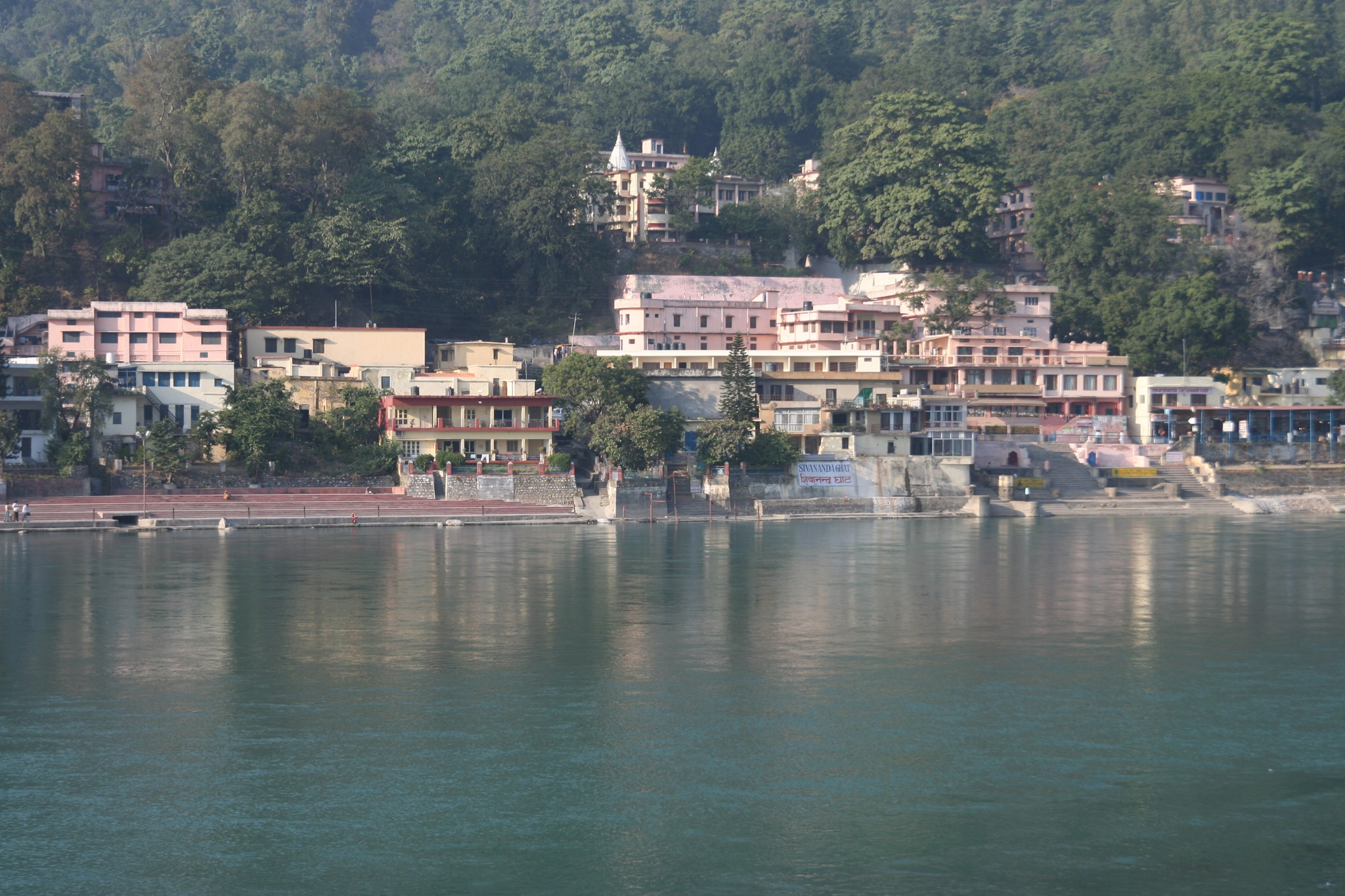
Sivananda Ashram, Rishikesh, the headquarters of Divine Life Society, founded by Sivananda Saraswati in 1936

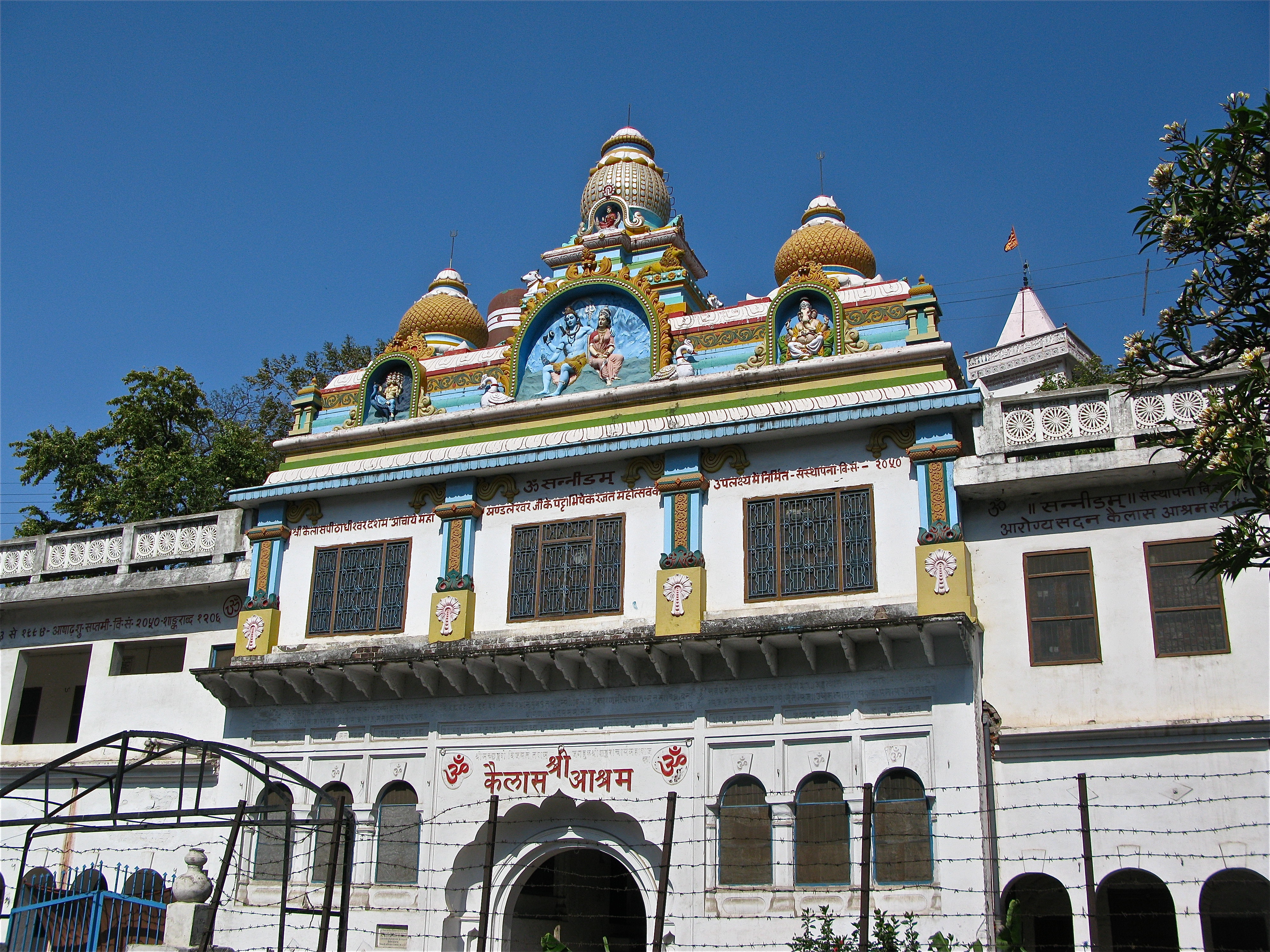
Kailash Ashram, Muni Ki Reti, Rishikesh, established by Dhanraj Giri

== See also ==
- Sivananda Ashram
- Dhanraj Giri
- Parbrahm Ashram
