= Advayataraka Upanishad =

Ancient Sanskrit text

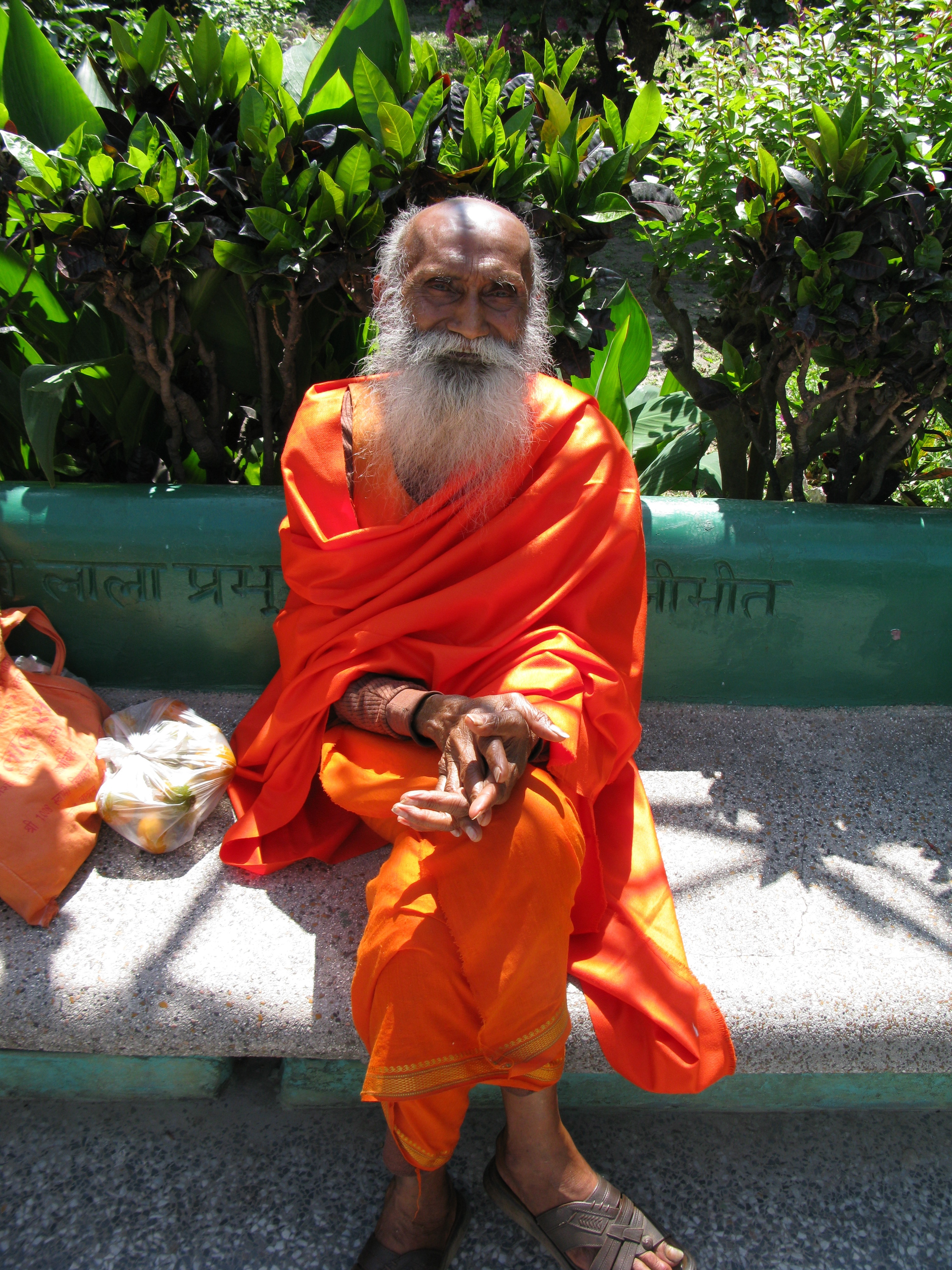
- The text praises Guru as the one who dispels darkness
- Devanagari: अद्वयतारक
- IAST: Advayatāraka
- Title means: "non-dual deliverer"
- Type: Yoga
- Linked Veda: Shukla Yajurveda
- Chapters: 1
- Verses: 19
- Philosophy: Yoga, Vedanta

Advayataraka Upanishad is an ancient Sanskrit text and a minor Upanishad of Hinduism. It is one of the 19 Upanishads attached to the Shukla Yajurveda. It is classified as a Yoga Upanishad.

The Upanishad is notable for its discussion of Guru (teacher). The text discusses three goals of introspection, Taraka yoga and the nondual nature of Reality (Brahman). The text also includes verses on Raja yoga, and Kundalini Tantra. The Upanishad also states that maya or illusion is the reason for the "differentiation" of the living from God.

It is listed 53 in the serial order of the Muktika enumerated by Rama to Hanuman in the modern era anthology of 108 Upanishads. The text is also known as Advaya Taraka Upanishad and Advayatarakopanishad.

== Nomenclature ==
Advayataraka is a composite Sanskrit word, consisting of advaya (अद्वय) which means "nondual, identity, unity, not two, without a second", and tāraka (तारक) which means literally "star, pupil of the eye" and figuratively "deliverer, rescuer". In Raja Yoga parlance tāraka is that light between and in front of the eyebrows which is realized during meditation.

== Chronology ==
Gavin Flood dates this text, along with other Yoga Upanishads, to be probably from the 100 BCE to 300 CE period.

== Structure ==
The Advayataraka text is one of the rare Yoga Upanishads that contains a mix of prose and poetic verses, while others are in verse form. It consists of one chapter, eighteen passages/verses with an epilogue nineteenth praise passage.

== Contents ==
The Teacher

A Guru is the highest wealth, greater than all else.

— Advayataraka Upanishad 18

=== Yogin: Ethics first ===
The text opens declaring its target and stating ethics as the eligibility requirement for yogin, calling him as Yati. Yati is synonymous with Sanyasis, Bhiksu, Pravrajita/Pravrajitā, Sramana and Parivrajaka in ancient and medieval Hindu texts.

The first verse states, "then and for that reason, this knowledge is for Yati who has gained six behavioral qualities – Sama (calm mind, same-ness towards everything), Dama (temperance and self-restraint such as Ahimsa), Uparati (tolerance, quietness, cessation of cravings), Titiksha (endurance, cheerfulness no matter what), Samadhana (focus, one pointedness), and Śraddhā (faith, confidence).

=== Taraka yoga ===
Verse 2 of the text states that the yogin should always keep in mind, "my true form is consciousness", and introspect on the transcendent Brahman (ultimate reality) whose true form is sat-cit-ananda, or "being-consciousness-bliss". It is this introspection, asserts the text, by which he becomes Brahman form (Taraka) himself. It is through the use of Neti-Neti, or "not this, not this", states verse 3, does the yogin reach release from the fear of rebirth and the liberating knowledge of non-dual Brahman.

==== Introspection: three goals ====
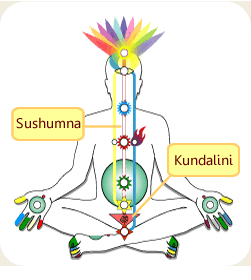
Kundalini chakra diagram

The Upanishad discusses introspection objectives, Lakshya (aim, goal, target), from verse 4 to 7. The introspection is of three types, each yielding insights, signs or visions, and is described as Taraka-yoga.

The internal Lakshya is described in Tantra terminology. It is realizing the Sushumna nadi (Sushumna, the middle-body, primary blood vessel and energy channel), running from below spinal cord through Kundalini to one's skull. Realizing this with his mind, he is released from bondage he feels from past sin. He can see a blue radiant space with closed eyes once he attains this state of internal Lakshya. When kundalini is realized the knowledge of brahman is achieved which is the only stage when one crosses the threshold of fear of the cycle of birth, aging and death.

The external Lakshya, the second type is described in the text's verse 6 as the brightness on top of his head, sensed by the Yogin. It is of blue color bordering with indigo color above, asserts the text, and orange or golden in front, in any direction of earth he sees. The universe looks radiant to this accomplished Yogin.

The verse 7 mentions the third, middle or intermediate Lakshya. It is what the Yogin senses at dawn during sunrise, where he feels his self identical, translates Ayyangar, with "the vast disc of resplendent Sun", darkness brought into relief by the splendor of radiant Taraka form, transcendent lustre excelling all, outside and within.

These three types of visions, states Dhavamony, are part of the Ambhavi-mudra tantric practice.

==== Taraka ====
The text clarifies Taraka-yoga to be of two kinds:

Know then that Yoga is two fold, in the relationship of priority and posteriority. The former should be known Taraka (mind), the latter Amanaska (non mind).

— Advayataraka Upanishad, Verse 8

Verse 9 asserts that macrocosm of the universe is present inside the microcosm of human body, and the Yogin should contemplate upon macrocosm and microcosm as essentially one. Taraka can be distinguished into two, one Murti-Taraka (one with form) and the other Amurti-Taraka (one without form), states verse 10. The Murti-Taraka can be perceived with sensory organs, the Amurti-Taraka is knowable by means of introspection with "the eye aided by the mind". The Taraka manifestation occurs when there is conjunction of the Atman, the Mind and the eyes, to perceive the inward truth, asserts the text.

The Divine Self

Turn the mind's eye to the point within the heart where the light of the Divine Self burns.

— Advayataraka Upanishad 10

In verse 11, the text states that the Taraka and Amanaska methods can be practiced by casting one's eyes, conjoint with one's mind by a Yogin. Sambhu mudra is described in verse 12. The praise for Guru, for Yoga practice, is first mentioned in verse 13, as the one who helps one guide the introspective stages, leading the Yogin to realize the consciousness, intelligence and Turiya (deep, fourth state of consciousness).

=== Importance of a Guru ===
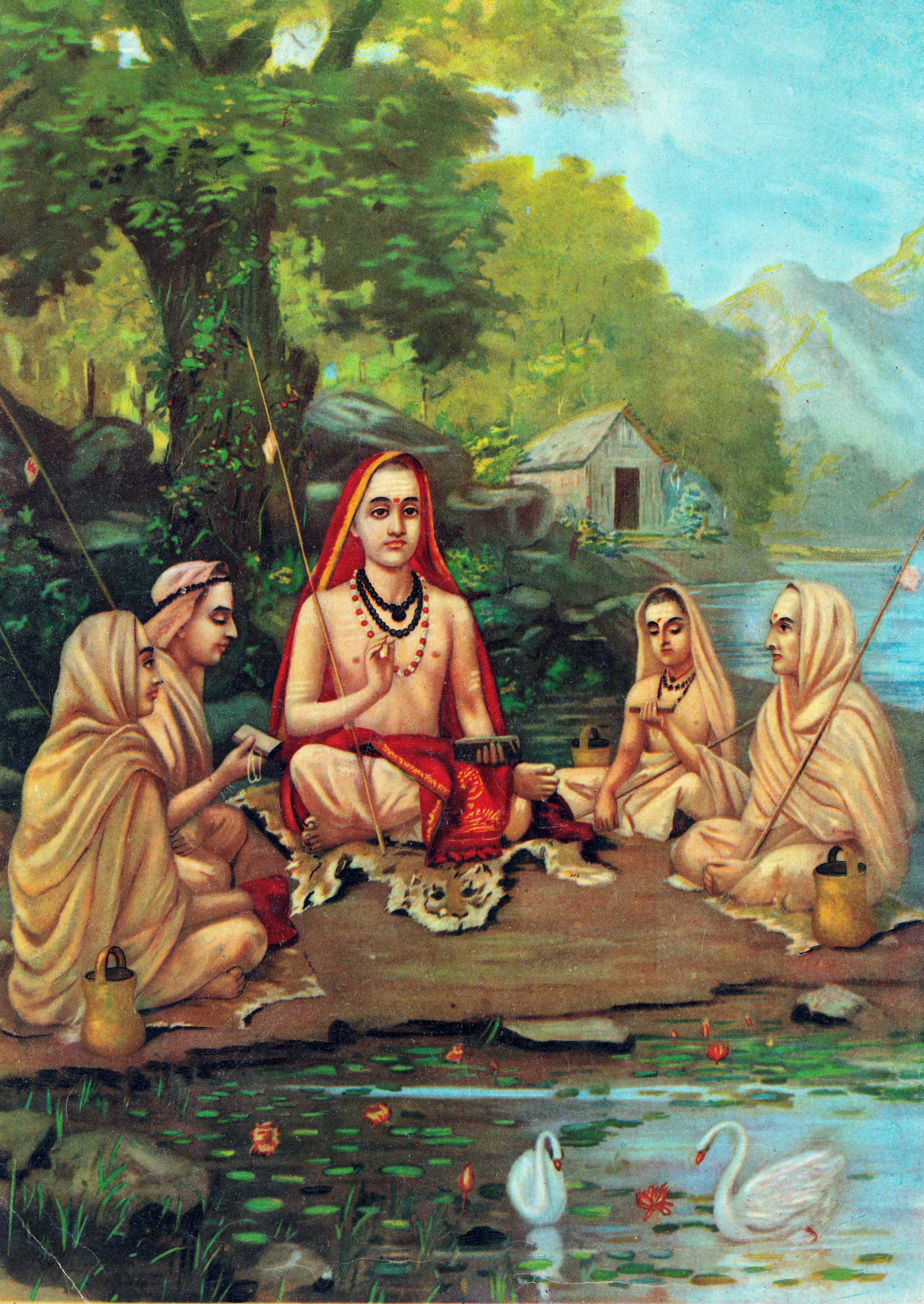
Adi Shankara as a guru with his students.

Four often-cited verses (14–18) from the Advayataraka Upanishad reverentially narrate a Guru or teacher. The best Acharya (आचार्य, spiritual teacher), state verses 14-15, is one knows the Vedas, a devotee of the god Vishnu, has no spite, who knows yoga, has his own views on it, Yoga is part of how he lives his life, is clean, reveres his own Guru, and who understands the concept of Purusha (Atman-Brahman).

The Upanishad then explains the word "Guru" as follows:

गुशब्दस्त्वन्धकारः स्यात् रुशब्दस्तन्निरोधकः ।
अन्धकारनिरोधित्वात् गुरुरित्यभिधीयते ॥ १६॥

The syllable Gu indicates darkness, the syllable Ru means its dispeller,
Because of the quality of dispelling darkness, the Guru is thus termed.

— Advayataraka Upanishad, 16

Thus, the role of a Guru is one of eliminating ignorance by helping the student reach knowledge. The Guru is the supreme goal, the transcendent Brahman, wisdom, the last resort, asserts verse 17 of the Upanishad.

Further, the text in verse 18 praises the teacher as the "ultimate limit" and "supreme wealth", greater than all else.

== See also ==
- Yogatattva Upanishad
- Yoga-kundalini Upanishad
- Yoga Vasistha
