= Nischayananda =

Swami Nischayananda
- Suraj Rao
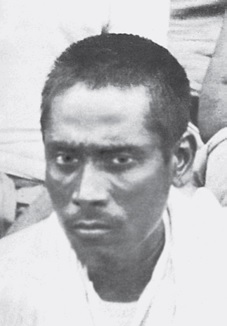
- Nischayananda, the direct monastic disciple of Vivekananda
- Born: Suraj Rao; 11 May 1865; Maharashtra
- Died: 22 October 1934; Haridwar
- Citizenship: India
- Occupation: Monk
- Known for: Spiritual work

Nischayananda (11 May 1865 – 22 October 1934) was an Indian monk who worked to help the poor and needy. He was a direct monastic disciple of Vivekananda. He, together with Kalyanananda was responsible for setting up and running the Ramakrishna Mission Sevashrama, Kankhal. He was inspired by Vivekananda's philosophy of serving man as God and dedicated his life to serve poor and downtrodden in the remote areas where no healthcare facility existed. He worked in military service before joining the Ramakrishna Order as a direct monastic disciple of Vivekananda. He met Vivekananda in Madras and decided to become his disciple. After Vivekananda's death, he went for pilgrimage and by chance came to Haridwar where he met his brother disciple Kalyanananda and joined him in carrying out the works of Ramakrishna Mission Sevashrama Kankhal.

== Pre Monastic Life ==
Nischayananda was born in 1865 in a small village near Janjira in Maharashtra. His pre monastic name was Suraj Rao. He was known as Raoji. He studied for a few years in an English school, but could not complete his study owing to family poverty. He knew several South Indian languages and in later life could also speak fluently in Bengali. After leaving school and not finding any suitable vocation, he joined military service in South Karnataka regiment. As part of his job, he traveled to many places, esp. pilgrimage spots in India. He also traveled abroad to Burma, Siam (Thailand), Gibraltar, Malta etc. He went to Andaman and studied the life of the tribals residing there and collected many information about their way of life. He was a first class shot and secured high rank in shooting competition in the military. He was promoted to the rank of lance corporal. Once, while he was in Raipur, he met Niranjananda, a direct disciple of Ramakrishna. Niranjananda introduced him to spiritual life and instilled in him a desire to meet Vivekananda, who was in West at that time. Suraj Rao went through all news and information that appeared about Vivekananda. In January 1897 when Vivekananda returned to India and was traveling through South India. Suraj Rao was one of the large crowd of villagers who had stopped the train carrying Vivekananda to Madras, to have a glimpse of him. He traveled by foot to Madras and met Vivekananda in Castle Kernan. Because he wanted to renounce the world and follow the footsteps of Vivekananda, which was hindered by his service commitment, Suraj Rao feigned insanity and was discharged from the military service. Immediately upon discharge he traveled to Calcutta and met Vivekananda in 1901. He was subsequently initiated by Vivekananda into monastic life, who gave him the name Nischayananda (Nischaya - determination).

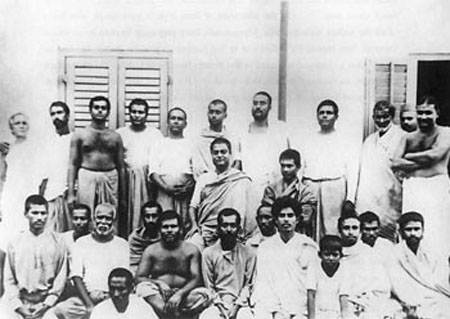
Nischayananda, sitting in the front most row. Vivekananda is sitting in the middle row

== Monastic life ==
Swami Nischayananda was assigned the responsibility of looking after Swami Vivekananda as his attendant. He discharged his duties and responsibilities as a worship. He used to daily fetch drinking water in a huge vessel for Swami Vivekananda from a tube well from Baranagar on the other side of Ganga. Once when Josephine MacLeod, an American friend of Swami Vivekananda, had advised Swami Nischayananda to assign this task to a servant, the latter was annoyed. Swami Vivekananda, who understood the reason for the dedicated labour, explained to Ms. MacLeod that she had offended the sense of devotion of his disciple because in India it was imperative for a disciple to serve his master in every possible way. On another occasion he was sent to purchase a milch cow for Belur Math and Swami Vivekananda had instructed him not to let go of the rope to which the cow would be tethered. While crossing the river Ganga, the cow had jumped into the river and Nischayananda, in order to not let it go, jumped into the water and dragged the cow to the other bank, risking his own life in the process, but never letting go of the rope. Swami Nischayananda was deeply influenced by both Shivaji and Bal Gangadhar Tilak, the two Maharashtrian icons. Tilak had visited Belur Math and met Swami Vivekananda in 1901. Swami Nischayananda affirmed that Tilak was deeply influenced by Swami Vivekananda's point of view about serving the poor with a view to uplift them.

Swami Nischayananda left Belur Math within a month of passing away of Swami Vivekananda. As per his testimony to Swami Saradananda in this regard, he came to Belur Math to work for Vivekananda and therefore had no further desire to stay after the latter's death. He became a wandering monk and visited various holy places, and spent his days in spiritual practices. He arrived in Haridwar to participate in Haridwar in 1903. There he met Swami Kalyanananda, another direct monastic disciple of Swami Vivekananda, who had already established the Ramakrishna Mission Sevashrama in Kankhal, near Haridwar. Swami Vivekananda had explicitly instructed Swami Nischayananda not to accept food without providing some kind of service to the community. Therefore, the latter joined Swami Kalyanananda in serving the poor and the sick in that region. The orthodox monks used to deride this spirit of service since according to traditional customs a monk should not indulge in any form of actions. However Kalyanananda and Nischayananda got strong backing from Dhanraj Giri, a very senior and well respected head of Kailash Math and a reputed scholar of Vedanta. Dhanraj Giri's strong support resulted in acceptance of the two disciples of Swami Vivekananda and their work among the community of monks in Northern India. He was very austere in his spiritual practices and continued spiritual practices like meditation at night, despite a hard toil during the day.

== Contribution ==
Swami Nischayananda worked with his brother disciple to develop the Ramakrishna Mission Sevashrama Kankhal into a hospital for the treatment of poor and needy. He himself nursed the patients, cleaned their bedpans and lavatories, prepared food and washed them. If a patient died they also carried the body to the river to immerse it as per the customs. His daily routine consisted in waking up early in the morning, carrying a medicine box and a bundle of other necessary articles, and walking to Rishikesh which was twenty-eight kilometres up the hill. There he would go from place to place inquiring about the well-being of the monks and other itinerants, treat the sick and feed the disabled. In the evening he would walk all the way back to Kankhal. At noon, he would go for begging his food. In the evening he would at times bring patients from Rishikesh to the Sevashrama. This he did for many years at a stretch.

For three decades, both the brother-monks, Kalyanananda and Nischayananda tirelessly kept serving pilgrims and local people in the Kumbha Mela by providing medical care and assistance. They served the pilgrims and monks in all the three Purna Kumbha Melas held in 1903, 1915 and 1927.

== Last Days ==
Swami Nischayananda fell ill with a gastric ulcer, and died on 22 October 1934 while sitting in the lotus posture.

== Legacy ==
The Ramakrishna Mission Sevashrama Kankhal (http://www.rkmkankhal.org/index.html) still stands. According to Abjajananda the spirit of worshiping God in every human being as ideal was finally accepted by the orthodox monks of the region when they saw the work of the two monks of Ramakrishna Order.

== External sources ==
- Monastic Disciples of Swami Vivekananda, by Swami Abjajananda, Advaita Ashrama, Mayavati, 2003, ISBN 9788175052468
- Abiswasya (Incredible) Vivekananda, by Manishankar Mukherjee (Shankar) (Bengali), Sahityam, Kolkata 2010, ISBN 8172670486

== See also ==
- Swami Achalananda
- Swami Atmananda
- Swami Bodhananda
- Swami Kalyanananda
- Swami Prakashananda
- Swami Sadananda
- Swami Shuddhananda
- Swami Swarupananda
- Swami Vimalananda
- Swami Virajananda
