= Dhanraj Giri =

Indian Hindu monk (1811–1901)

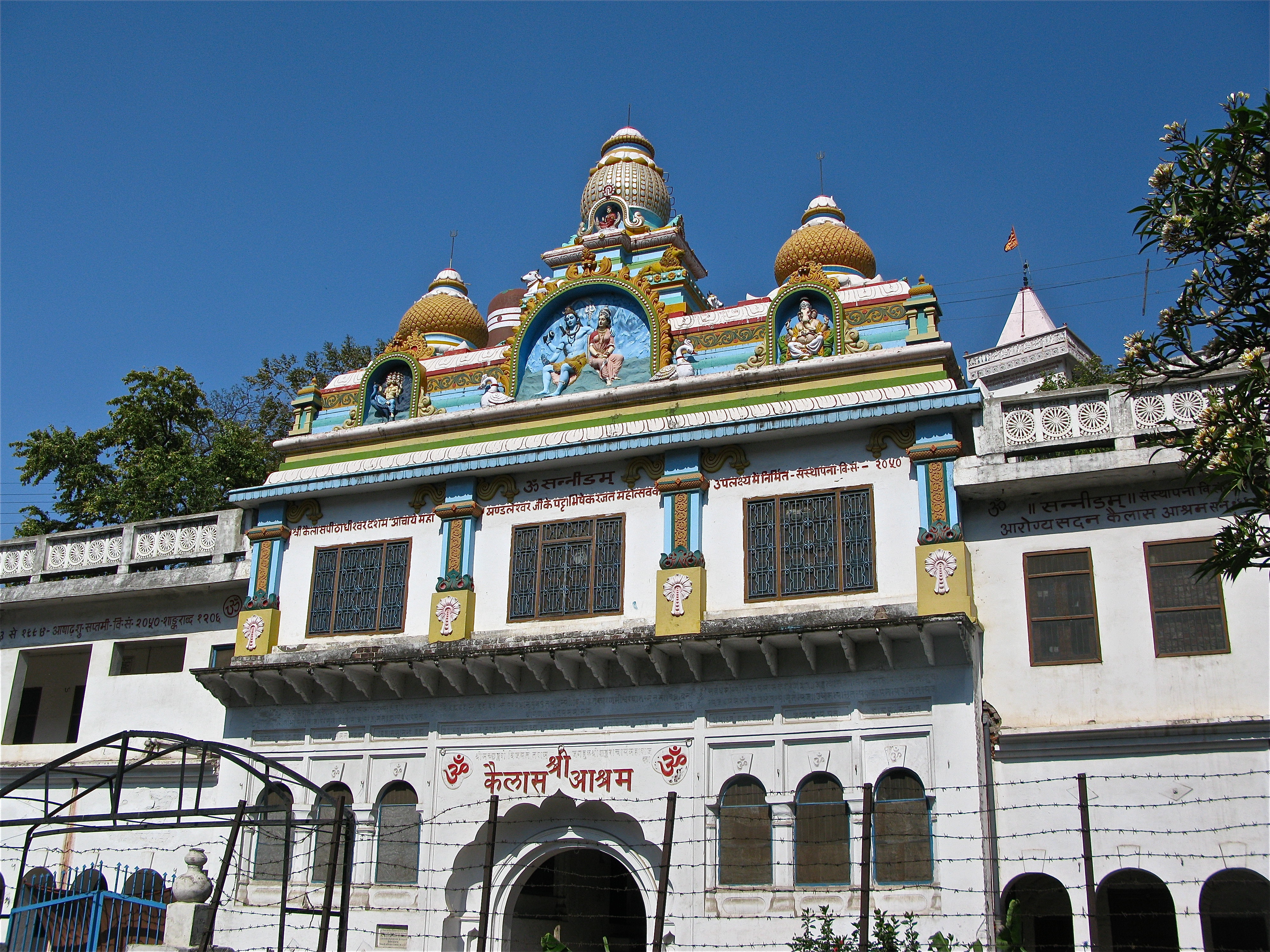
Kailash Ashram, Muni Ki Reti, Rishikesh, established by Dhanraj Giri, the first Abbott

Dhanraj Giri (1811–1901) was the abbot of Kailash Ashram, an ashram, which he established in 1880 at Muni Ki Reti, Rishikesh. It was one of the first large ashrams to be established in Rishikesh, prior to which it was mostly as a place for individual seekers, or pilgrims to stop over on way to Char Dham temples pilgrimage. He was a famous monk in Northern India and was a scholar in Vedanta philosophy. He was well acquainted with spiritual luminaries of nineteenth century India like Swami Vivekananda.

== Biography and legacy ==
Dhanraj Giri as part of his wanderings had come to Rishikesh from Varanasi and had put up in Surat Giri Bangla ashram in Kankhal. Subsequently, he started an open-air education centre for Vedanta studies to which many students joined. In 1880, the king of Tehri region granted him a piece of land for setting up an ashram and a university for studying ancient Indian scriptures, especially Vedanta. This monastery came to be known as Kailash Ashram.

Swami Vivekananda, as part of his travels in North India, went to Rishikesh and also went to Kailash Ashrama. Giri was a prominent Advaita Vedantist of the period, and Swami Abhedananda, another prominent monastic disciple of Ramakrishna studied Vedanta in Kailsha Ashrama under Dhanraj Giri as a resident student for many months.

In the early part of twentieth century, when the two monastic disciples of Vivekananda, Kalyanananda and Nischayananda, had established the Ramakrishna Mission Sevashrama, Kankhal, they faced discrimination in the hands of local orthodox monks for their service to the sick and poor, as such activities were considered of low grade by orthodox monks. Dhanraj Giri, who wielded considerable influence among the monks and who regularly used to feed the monks from his Ashrama, provided full support to the service activities conducted by the two disciples of Swami Vivekananda and gave them special respect and importance in front of all other monks, which gradually ensured the acceptance of their work in the wider community.

Today, the ashram he established continues to be a noted centre for exegesis of Hindu shastras, and Vedantic study and scholarship.
