= Gurunath Vidyanidhi =

Sanskrit scholar (1862–1931)

Gurunath Vidyanidhi (1862–1931) was a Sanskrit scholar who was born in Vikrampur in the Dhaka District of what later became Bangladesh. He was the author of a number of books used by Sanskrit scholars and researchers, including Mugdhavodh Vyakaran, Mitralabh, Amarkos, Sahitya Darpan and Chhando Manjari.
