= The Guru Papers =

1993 book by Diana Alstad and Joel Kramer

The Guru Papers: Masks of Authoritarian Power (1993) was written by Diana Alstad and Joel Kramer (Frog Books, ISBN 978-1883319007).
