= Maitreya Upanishad =

Hindu text

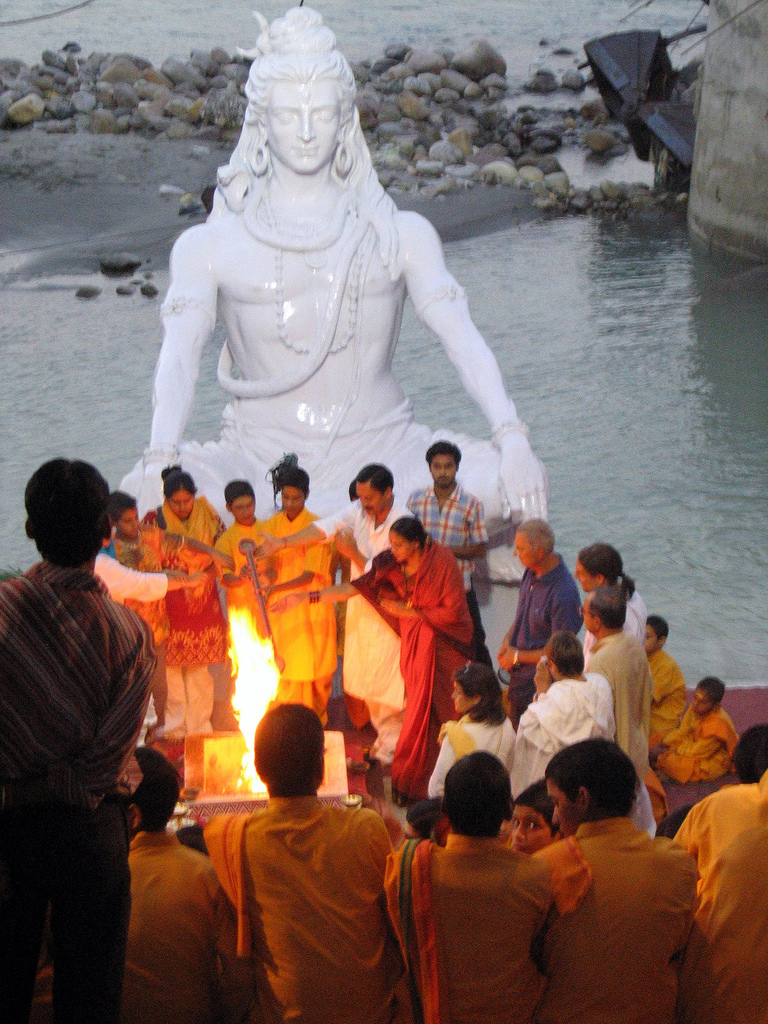
- Shiva shares his wisdom on soul and Brahman in Maitreya Upanishad
- Devanagari: मैत्रेय
- IAST: Maitreya
- Date: after 3rd-century CE
- Type: Sannyasa
- Linked Veda: Samaveda
- Chapters: 3
- Verses: 73
- Philosophy: Vedanta or Vedic teachings

The Maitreya Upanishad (Sanskrit: मैत्रेय उपनिषत्, IAST: Maitreya Upaniṣad) is one of the minor Upanishads of Hinduism. Composed in Sanskrit, it is one of the 16 Upanishads that belongs to the Samaveda, is classified as one of the 20 Sannyasa Upanishads (Renunciation), and is one of the Vedanta Upanishads. The text is listed at 29 in the serial order in the Muktika enumerated by Rama to Hanuman in the modern era anthology of 108 Upanishads.

The Upanishad states that renunciation and self-knowledge is the path to moksha (liberation and spiritual freedom). According to Maitreya, "the Lord is within the heart of each person, he is the witness of the reason's dance, and the object of the utmost love". One must renounce the world, to achieve the rapture of the Self and become one with Brahman. The best renunciation is one, states Maitreya, where one abandons pride, wealth, delusion and lust; when delusion dies in a person, enlightenment is born.

In chapters 2 and 3 of the Upanishad, Lord Shiva preaches sage Maitreya the secret of highest reality (Brahman). The text states that Atman (soul, self), Brahman and Shiva are the same, one must understand one's true essence that is soul, and one must worship with the thought, "I am he".

The Maitreya Upanishad, states Patrick Olivelle, is a record of Sandhya rituals and rites that were abandoned in the Advaita Vedanta tradition of Hinduism, along with the rationale for this development.

== Etymology ==
The word "Maitreya" means "benevolent" or "friendly". It is a descendant of the name of a Rigvedic deity, namely Mitra. The name of the Upanishad likely reflects the name of the author. The text is also known as Maitreyopanishad

== Chronology ==
Patrick Olivelle states that six Sannyasa Upanishads – Aruni, Laghu-Sannyasa, Kathasruti Paramahamsa, Jabala and Brahma Upanishads – were completed in the last few centuries of the 1st-millennium BCE, followed by Ashrama Upanishad which was completed around 300 CE. The Maitreya Upanishad is one of the younger Upanishads that likely followed the Ashrama in medieval period of the 1st millennium CE.

=== Manuscripts ===
Two versions of Maitreya Upanishad manuscripts have survived into the modern times, one from north India and one from south. These differ primarily in chapter 2, but the message is essentially the same. The south Indian manuscript is part of 108 Upanishads collection, and is typically the oft translated version.

The Maitreya Upanishad is also named as Maitreyi Upanishad in two anthologies. Schrader states this is an error, but one which has spread to many manuscript collections.

== Structure ==
The Upanishad is structured in three chapters. The first chapter has four sections, the first three of which are prose, and the last section has a prose prologue and fourteen verses, all structured as a dialogue between ascetic king Brhadratha and Sakayanya. The second chapter starts with a prose prologue, has three sections with a total of thirty verses, structured as knowledge from god Shiva to Maitreya. Chapter three has no separated sections and consists of 24 verses, further elaborating Shiva's wisdom on the Brahman, Atman and unity of the two.

== Contents ==
=== Chapter 1: The ascetic king and the path to moksha ===
The chapter 1 opens with ascetic-king worshipping Surya, the sun-god.

King Brihadratha renounces his kingdom, and retires into wilderness. He performs Tapas for a thousand days to Surya (sun god), after which he is visited by sage Sakayanya, the one who knows the Self. Pleased with Brihadratha, the sage asks him to seek a boon. The sannyasi Brihadratha asks the sage for the knowledge of soul.

Initially the sage says that the subject of Brahman or Atma was difficult to explain, old fashioned knowledge, and the ascetic king should ask for something else. The ascetic king states that everything is transient, lofty peaks crumble down, pole star swerves with seasons, oceans dry up and gods fall with time. Just like everything in universe, states the renunciant king, desires and joy are transitory, rebirth a part of existence. He seeks deliverance from the cycle of life.

Sakayanya then expounds the nature of human life, starting with the statement that "Artha is Anartha", or "objects of senses are in truth worthless", that a soul that craves and attaches to hedonistic pleasures never reaches its highest potential.

By Tapas a man reaches goodness,
through goodness he takes hold of the mind.
Through the mind he reaches the self,
reaching the self he comes to rest.

— Maitreya Upanishad, 1.4.2

The Maitreya Upanishad, in verse 1.4.4 states that the pursuit of rituals and rites are false, that it is the mind that travels the path of truth which self-liberates and attains freedom. A man with tranquil mind is serene, it is he who abides in his soul and enjoys undecaying bliss, states the Upanishad. One must set one's mind on Brahman, as one does for sensory object, and those who do so are on their path to release.

For the mind alone is samsara!
Let a man purify it with zeal.
The mind a man possesses shapes his future course:
that is the eternal mystery.

— Maitreya Upanishad, 1.4.5

The Lord (God) is within the heart of each person, translates Olivelle, "He is the witness of the reason's dance, and the object of the utmost love". This Lord has no beginning and no end, is pure light, can neither be seized nor abandoned, is without mark or sign, is calm and profound, states the Upanishad. He is neither light nor darkness, He is changeless and without false appearances, He is knowledge, He is free, He is true, He is subtle, He is an ocean of bliss, and He is I, the inner essence of a person, asserts the Maitreya Upanishad. For refuge, one must return to one's innate bliss. To the one who is without attachments, nothing affects and no grief overtakes him. Those who do not accept social class, subdivisions, duties imposed by others, live by their conscience and are sated by their own bliss, no torment can touch their core, states the Maitreya Upanishad.

=== Chapter 2: Contemplate the truth, abandon rituals and idols ===
The second chapter of the Upanishad opens with Maitreya meeting god Shiva in mount Kailasha, and asking him about the knowledge of highest reality. He requests Him to enlighten him on the secrets of Tattva.

Shiva explains to him stating that the human body is a shrine with Jiva imbibed in it representing Him alone.

The body is said to be a temple,
and the soul is truly Shiva.
Discard the faded flower offerings of ignorance,
Worship with the thought: "I am he".

— Maitreya Upanishad, 2.1.1

The human body, states the text, is a "filthy house of joy and grief", one that is built with humors, is born, suffers from diseases over its life, and ultimately dies. The section 2 of chapter 2 states that the one who seeks liberation must seek, states the Upanishad, the "internal or spiritual bath that consists of cleansing the mind". The true purification is achieved by "washing with the soil of knowledge and the water of detachment", bringing purity to mind.

A man who seeks liberation, asserts the Upanishad, should renounce everything and leave his native land. He should abandon pride, abandon wealth, abandon delusion and abandon lust. When delusion dies, states verse 2.3.4, enlightenment is born.

In section 3 of chapter 2, the text questions the value of rituals to spiritual enlightenment, as well as the need for a cloister and life in a forest. These verses, states Patrick Olivelle, summarize the reasons why Advaita Vedanta tradition abandoned rituals, and redefined what solitude and path to self-knowledge means:

The sun of consciousness always shines brightly,
in the sky of our hearts,
It does not set and it does not rise,
how can we perform the twilight worship.

There is one alone without a second:
this conviction arrived at through these teacher's words,
they say, this is true solitude,
not a cloister nor a forest's depth.

— Maitreya Upanishad, 2.3.5 – 2.3.6

This sentiment is repeated in verses 2.3.8 onward in the Upanishad, but the text adds that "forsaking rites and chanting renunciation" alone does not lead to knowledge. It is meditation about the oneness of "soul and supreme self" that leads to enlightenment. Before renouncing, suggests Maitreya, a person should reach an inner state that has an aversion to all worldly goods. Once one has reached that state, and renounced, one must contemplate about spiritual truths, states the text. The Upanishad asserts, translates Olivelle, that "to reflect on the scriptures is middling, to ponder over mantras is worse, to think about sacred bathing spots is even worse". The Upanishad recommends that the truly spiritual man should not worship idols:

Worship of idols made of stone, metal, clay or precious stones,
causes a man who seeks after freedom to undergo repeated births.
A recluse, therefore, shall worship only within his heart,
to avoid rebirth let him shun outward worship.

— Maitreya Upanishad, 2.3.17

Worship the Self (soul) within you, that which shines before the act of sight, the state which is beyond waking consciousness and sleeping consciousness, one that is the highest and essential state within, assert verses 2.3.20 and 2.3.21 of the Upanishad.

=== Chapter 3: I am I, I am Brahman, I am he ===
The liberated self is Om, states Maitreya Upanishad.

Chapter 3 is a celebration and praise of one who has achieved living liberation. It also includes statements about the inner state and characteristics of a person who has achieved moksha.

I am I, but also the other; I am Brahman, I am the source,
I am the teacher of the whole world, I am the whole world, I am he!
I am only I, I am perfect, I am pure, I am supreme,
I am spotless and eternal, I am I, I am always he!

From honor and dishonor and from qualities I am free, I am Shiva,
From oneness and duality and from opposites I am free, I am he!

From coming into being and ceasing to be, and from light I am free,
I am both ugly and beautiful, I am free from the equal and unequal,
I am free from the All and the Non-all, I have the nature of goodness, I always am,
I have no refuge, I am no refuge, I am pure, I am Brahman, I am he!

— Maitreya Upanishad, 3.1.1 – 3.1.9 (Abridged), Translated by Patrick Olivelle

The chapter states that the liberated soul is eternal, is Om, and beyond meditator, meditation and the object meditated on, it is Brahman, it is "being-consciousness-bliss", it is essence of "all sacred bathing spots", it is Shiva, it is the fruit of all holiness, and it is pure spirit. The soul, states the text, is free from six changes (existence, birth, growth, maturity, decay and death), is free from six sheaths (skin, blood, flesh, fat, marrow and bones), and is free from six inner enemies (desire, hatred, greed, delusion, pride and envy). This soul is "light of pure consciousness" and without attributes, declares Maitreya Upanishad.

== Bibliography ==
- Deussen, Paul; Bedekar, V.M. (tr.); Palsule (tr.), G.B. (1 January 1997). Sixty Upanishads of the Veda. Motilal Banarsidass. ISBN 978-81-208-1467-7.
- Nair, Shantha N. (1 January 2008). Echoes of Ancient Indian Wisdom. Pustak Mahal. ISBN 978-81-223-1020-7.
- Olivelle, Patrick (1992). Samnyasa Upanishads. Oxford University Press. ISBN 9780195070453.
- Parmeshwaranand, Swami (1 January 2000). Encyclopaedic Dictionary of Upanisads. Sarup & Sons. ISBN 978-81-7625-148-8.
- Ramamoorthy, Dr. H.; Nome (2000). The Song of Ribhu: The English Translation of the Tamil Ribhu Gita. Society of Abidance in Truth. ISBN 978-0-9703667-0-2.
- Shankarananda, Swami (2004). How To Live In Old Age. Chinmaya Mission. ISBN 978-81-7597-290-2.
