= Brihadratha Ikshvaku =

Brihadratha, belonging to the Ikshvaku race, was a king of the Vedic era (there are several kings of this name in Hindu tradition). This name Brihadratha of a warrior king who was a Maharatha is found in the Rig Veda. The word, Brihadratha, means the Mighty Warrior. He appears at the beginning of the Maitri Upanishad after he had renounced his kingdom in favour of his son, seeking for himself relief from the endless cycle of birth and rebirth. No other information about him or his period is available in this text or in any other text. Maitri Upanishad belongs to the Maitrayaniya branch of Krishna Yajur Veda, which upanishad was taught to Sakayana by Maitri or Maitreya, the son of Mitra. Brihadratha chose the knowledge of the Self when he was offered a boon. He gave up his home and possessions and thereafter assisted by Sakayanya even renounced the “I-ness” of his body.

Anti-Hedonism, evident in the Katha Upanishad in the refusal of Nachiketa to be seduced by the life of pleasure offered to him by Yama, degenerates into utter pessimism when Nachiketa tells Yama

- what decaying mortal here below would delight in a life of the contemplation of the pleasures of beauty and love, when once he has come to taste of the kind of life enjoyed by the unageing immortals? (Katha Upanishad I.1.28).

This pessimism surpasses all bounds in the lament of Brihadratha before Sage Sakayana, as he asks

- What is the use of the satisfaction of desires in this foul-smelling and unsubstantial body which is a conglomeration of ordure, urine, wind, bile and phlegm, and which is spoiled by the content of bones, skin, sinews, marrow, flesh, semen, blood, mucus and tears? What is the use of the satisfaction of desires in this body which is afflicted by lust, anger, covetousness, fear, dejection, envy, separation from the desired, union with the undesirable, hunger, thirst, old age, death, disease and grief ? Verily all this world merely decays.look at the flies and the gnats, the grass and the trees, that are born merely to perish. But what of these ? The great oceans dry-up, the mountains crumble, the pole-star deviates from its place, the wind-cords are broken, the earth is submerged, and the very gods are dislocated from their positions

and, he entreats the son of Sakayana, who appeared before him in the forest, to save him as one might save a frog from a waterless well.

Sakayanya then taught Brihadratha how to suppress his own mind because only when the mind is suppressed does one see the brilliant Self glowing everywhere in all Its glory and by seeing whom one freed from own thoughts becomes selfless. In selflessness one attains absolute unity.
