= Ratha Kalpana =

Hindu metaphor

- Samkhya: Kapila
- Yoga: Patanjali
- Vaisheshika: Kaṇāda, Prashastapada
- Secular: Valluvar

Ratha Kalpana (from Sanskrit ratha 'chariot' and kalpana 'image') is a metaphor used in Hindu scriptures to describe the relationship between the senses, mind, intellect and the Self. The metaphor was first used in the Katha Upanishad and is thought to have inspired similar descriptions in the Bhagavad Gita, the Dhammapada and Plato's Phaedrus. Gerald James Larson, a scholar of Indian philosophies, believes that the chariot metaphor contains one of the earliest references to ideas and terminology of the Indian philosophical school Samkhya.

== Background ==
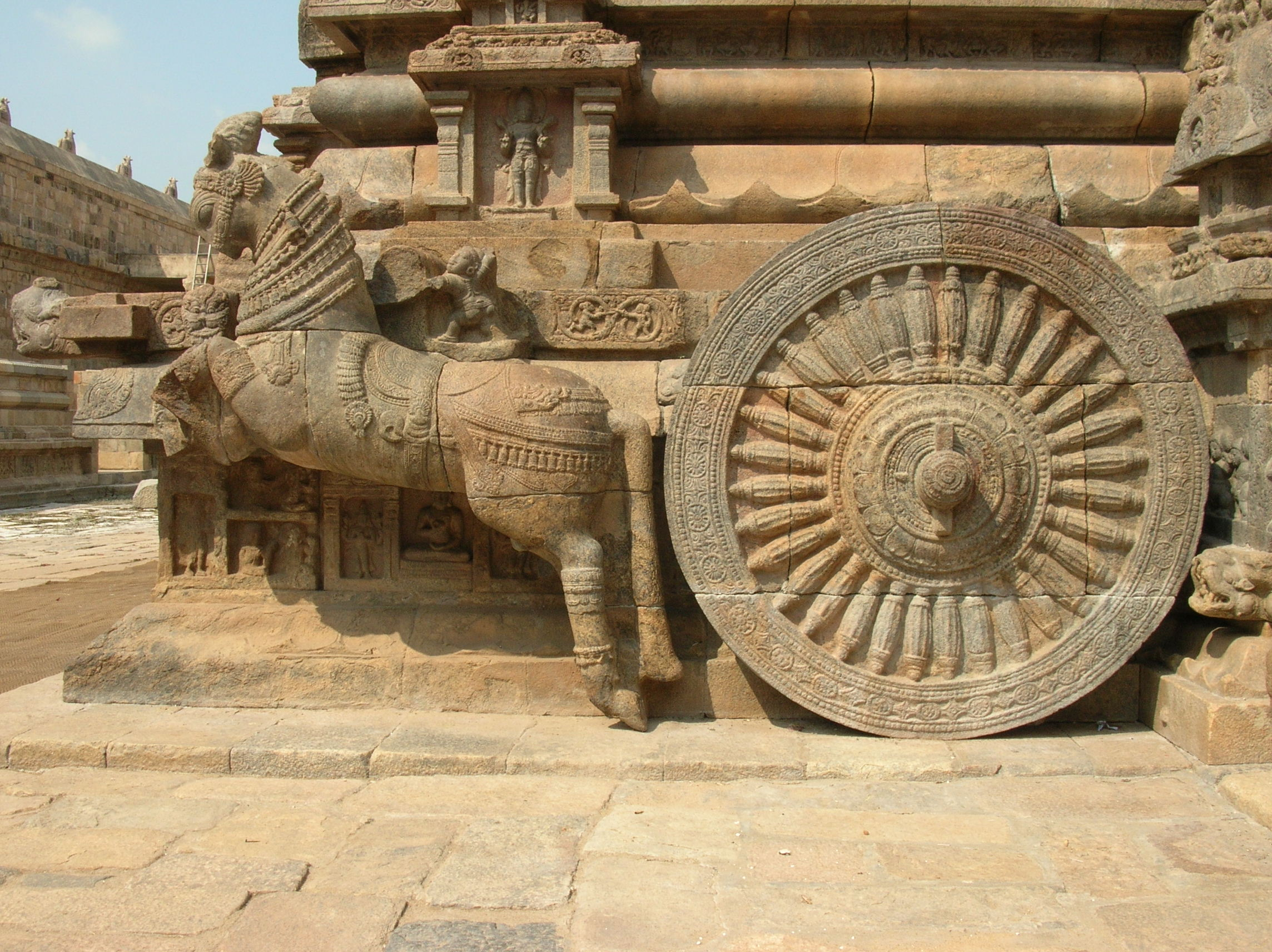
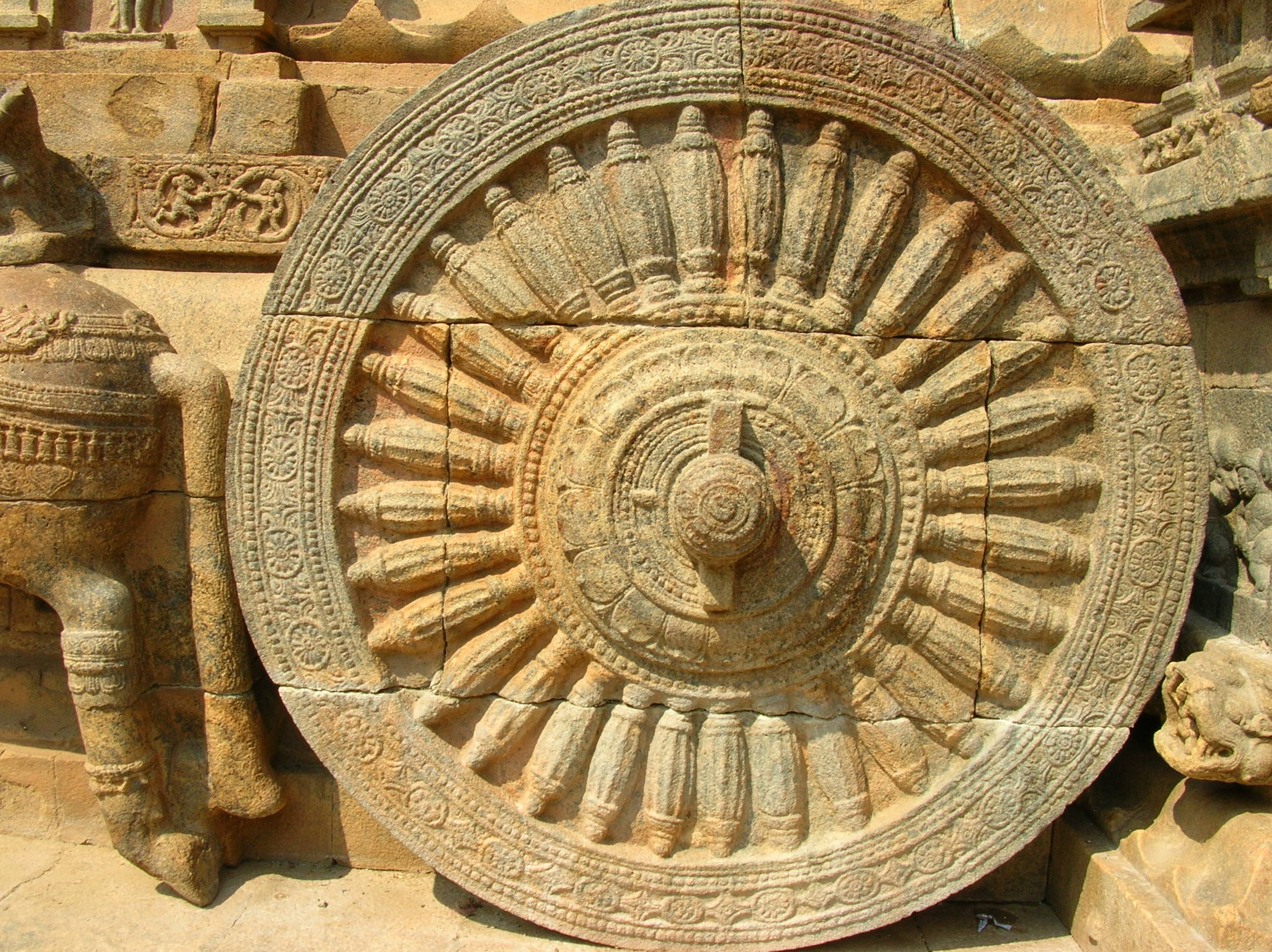
Horse-drawn chariot carved onto the mandapam of Airavateswarar temple, Darasuram, c. 12th century AD (left). The chariot and its wheel (right) are sculpted with fine details

The chariot analogy first appears the third chapter of Katha Upanishad, as a device to explain the Atman (Self) as distinct from the mind, intelligence and sense organs. In this context, spiritual practice is seen as a return to consciousness through the levels of manifested existence. The metaphor forms a part of the teaching imparted to Nachiketa, a child seeking knowledge about life after death, by Yama, the Hindu god of death.

William K. Mahony, in The Artful Universe: An Introduction to the Vedic Religious Imagination, writes, "We have in this metaphor an image of a powerful process that can either lead to fulfillment or in which the seeker can become lost."

== Analogy ==
Verses 1.3.3–11 of Katha Upanishad deal with the allegoric expression of human body as a chariot. The body is equated to a chariot where the horses are the senses, the mind is the reins, and the driver or charioteer is the intellect. The passenger of the chariot is the Self (Atman). Through this analogy, it is explained that the Atman is separate from the physical body, just as the passenger of a chariot is separate from the chariot. The verses conclude by describing control of the chariot and contemplation on the Self as ways by which the intellect acquires Self Knowledge.

He who has the understanding of the driver of the chariot and controls the rein of his mind,
he reaches the end of the journey, that supreme abode of the all–pervading

— Katha Upanishad 1.3.10–11

Shankaracharya Commentary:

Here a chariot is imagined for the atman, conditioned in Samsara, entitled to acquire knowledge and perform Karma for attaining emancipation and for traveling in Samsara, as a means to reach both. Know the atman, who is the enjoyer of the fruits of Karma and is in the bondage of Samsara, to be the lord of the chariot. Know the body to be verily the chariot, because like a chariot the body is drawn by the senses occupying the place of horses. Know also the intelligence to be the driver, furnished with the capacity for determination, because the body is mainly guided by the intelligence, as the chariot is mainly guided by the driver; for, everything done by the body is generally done by the intelligence. Know the mind with its characteristics of volition, doubt, etc., to be the reins; for, the senses, such as the ear, perform their functions when grasped by the mind as horses by the reins.

== See also ==
- Chariot Allegory
- Kosha
- Vajira
