= Phaedrus (dialogue) =

Work by Plato

The Phaedrus (/ˈfiːdrəs/; Ancient Greek: Φαῖδρος, romanized: Phaidros), written by Plato, is a dialogue between Socrates and Phaedrus, an interlocutor in several dialogues. The Phaedrus was presumably composed around 370 BC, about the same time as Plato's Republic and Symposium. Although the dialogue appears to be primarily concerned with the topic of love, the discussion also revolves around the art of rhetoric and how it should be practiced, and dwells on subjects as diverse as metempsychosis (the Greek tradition of reincarnation) and erotic love, and the nature of the human soul shown in the famous chariot allegory.

== Setting ==
Socrates runs into Phaedrus on the outskirts of Athens. Phaedrus has just come from the home of Epicrates of Athens, where Lysias, son of Cephalus, has given a speech on love. Socrates, stating that he is "sick with passion for hearing speeches", (Note: Plato, Phaedrus, trans. by Alexander Nehamas and Paul Woodruff. From Plato: Complete Works, ed. by John M. Cooper. ISBN 0-87220-349-2, 228b (stph. p.)) walks into the countryside with Phaedrus. Socrates is hoping that Phaedrus will repeat the speech. They sit by a stream under a plane tree and a chaste tree, and the rest of the dialogue consists of oration and discussion.

The dialogue does not set itself as a re-telling of the day's events. It is given in the direct words of Socrates and Phaedrus, without other interlocutors to introduce the story. This is in contrast to dialogues such as the Symposium, in which Plato sets up multiple layers between the day's events and our hearing of it, explicitly giving us an incomplete, fifth-hand account.

== Dramatis personae ==
- Socrates
- Phaedrus
- Lysias (in absentia)

Lysias was one of the three sons of Cephalus, the patriarch whose home is the setting for Plato's Republic. Lysias was perhaps the most famous logographos (λογογράφος, lit. "speech writer") in Athens during the time of Plato. Lysias was a rhetorician and a sophist whose best-known extant work is a defense speech, "On the Murder of Eratosthenes". In the speech a man who killed his wife's lover claims that the laws of Athens required him to do it. The outcome of this speech is unknown.

== Summary ==
The dialogue consists of three speeches on the topic of love that serves as the subject to construct a discussion on the proper use of rhetoric. They encompass discussions of the soul, madness, divine inspiration, and the practice and mastery of an art.

As they walk out into the countryside, Socrates tries to convince Phaedrus to repeat the speech of Lysias which he has just heard. Phaedrus makes several excuses, but Socrates suspects strongly that Phaedrus has a copy of the speech with him. Saying that while Lysias is present, he would never allow himself to be used as a training partner for Phaedrus to practice his own speech-making on, he asks Phaedrus to expose what he is holding under his cloak. Phaedrus gives in and agrees to perform Lysias' speech. (Note: Phaedrus 228a–e)

=== Lysias' speech (230e–235e) ===
Phaedrus and Socrates walk through a stream and find a seat in the shade. Phaedrus and Socrates both note how anyone would consider Socrates a foreigner in the countryside, and Socrates attributes this fault to his love of learning which "trees and open country won't teach," while "men in the town" will. Socrates then proceeds to give Phaedrus credit for leading him out of his native land: "Yet you seem to have discovered a drug for getting me out. A hungry animal can be driven by dangling a carrot or a bit of greenstuff in front of it; similarly if you proffer me speeches bound in books I don't doubt you can cart me all around Attica, and anywhere else you please." (Note: Phaedrus 230d–231)

Phaedrus then commences to repeat Lysias' speech. Beginning with "You understand, then, my situation: I've told you how good it would be for us in my opinion, if this worked out", the speech proceeds to explain all the reasons why it is better to give your favor to a non-lover rather than a true lover. Friendship with a non-lover, he says, demonstrates objectivity and prudence; it doesn't create gossip when you are seen together; it doesn't involve jealousy; and it allows for a much larger pool of possible partners. You will not be giving your favor to someone who is "more sick than sound in the head" and is not thinking straight, overcome by love. He explains that it is best to give your favor to one who can best return it, rather than one who needs it most. He concludes by stating that he thinks the speech is long enough, and the listener is welcome to ask any questions if something has been left out.

Socrates, attempting to flatter Phaedrus, responds that he is in ecstasy and that it is all Phaedrus' doing. Socrates comments that as the speech seemed to make Phaedrus radiant, he is sure that Phaedrus understands these things better than he does himself, and that he cannot help follow Phaedrus' lead into his Bacchic frenzy. Phaedrus picks up on Socrates' subtle sarcasm and asks Socrates not to joke. (Note: Phaedrus 234d–e)

Socrates retorts that he is still in awe, and claims to be able to make an even better speech than Lysias on the same subject. (Note: Phaedrus 235a, c)

=== First speech of Socrates (237a–241d) ===
When Phaedrus begs to hear it, however, Socrates refuses to give the speech. Phaedrus warns him that he is younger and stronger, and Socrates should "take his meaning" and "stop playing hard to get". (Note: Phaedrus 236c–d) Finally, after Phaedrus swears on the plane tree that he will never recite another speech for Socrates if Socrates refuses, Socrates, covering his head, consents. (Note: Phaedrus 236e–237)

Socrates, rather than simply listing reasons as Lysias had done, begins by explaining that while all men desire beauty, some are in love and some are not. We are all ruled, he says, by two principles: one is our inborn desire for pleasure, and the other is our acquired judgment that pursues what is best (237d). Following your judgment is "being in your right mind", while following desire towards pleasure without reason is "outrage" (hubris). (Note: Phaedrus 237e–238)

Following different desires leads to different things; one who follows his desire for food is a glutton, and so on. The desire to take pleasure in beauty, reinforced by the kindred beauty in human bodies, is called Eros. (Note: Phaedrus 238a–c)

Remarking that he is in the grip of something divine, and may soon be overtaken by the madness of the nymphs in this place, (Note: Phaedrus 238c–d) he goes on.

The problem, he explains, is that one overcome with this desire will want to turn his boy (beloved, as it is normal in Athenian society to refer the 'beloved' as someone who is younger than the 'lover'. It is a pre-existing social norm to tie education and eros) into whatever is most pleasing to himself, rather than what is best for the boy. (Note: Phaedrus 238e) The boy's intellectual progress will be stifled, his physical condition will suffer, (Note: Phaedrus 239c) the lover will not wish the boy to mature and take a family, (Note: Phaedrus 240a) all because the lover is shaping him out of desire for pleasure rather than what is best. At some point, "right-minded reason" will take the place of "the madness of love", (Note: Phaedrus 241a) and the lover's oaths and promises to his boy will be broken.

The non-lover, he concludes, will do none of this, always ruled by judgment rather than desire for pleasure. Socrates, fearing that the nymphs will take complete control of him if he continues, states that he is going to leave before Phaedrus makes him "do something even worse". (Note: Phaedrus 242a)

However, just before Socrates is about to leave, he is stopped by the "familiar divine sign", his daemon, which always occurs and only just before Socrates is about to do something he should not. A voice "from this very spot" forbids Socrates to leave before he makes atonement for some offense to the gods. Socrates then admits that he thought both of the preceding speeches were terrible, saying Lysias' repeated itself numerous times, seemed uninterested in its subject, and seemed to be showing off. Socrates states that he is a "seer". While he is not very good at it, he is good enough for his purposes, and he recognizes what his offense has been: if love is a god or something divine, as he and Phaedrus both agree he is, he cannot be bad, as the previous speeches have portrayed him. (Note: Phaedrus 242c–e) Socrates, baring his head, vows to undergo a rite of purification as a follower of the Muses, and proceeds to give a speech praising the lover. (Note: Phaedrus 243a–b)

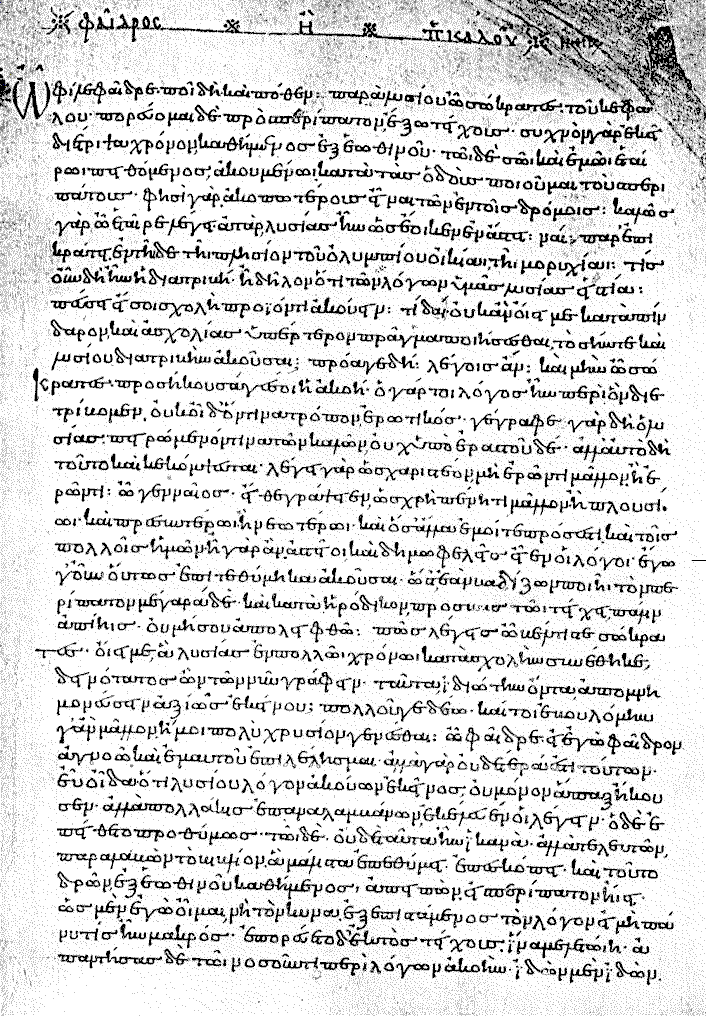
The beginning of Phaedrus in one of the most important medieval manuscripts of Plato, Codex Clarkianus 39 in the Bodleian Library, copied in AD 895.

=== Second speech of Socrates (244a–257b) ===
==== Madness (244a–245c) ====
Socrates begins by discussing madness. If madness is all bad, then the preceding speeches would have been correct, but in actuality, madness given as a gift of the gods provides us with some of the best things we have. (Note: Phaedrus 244a) There are, in fact, several kinds of divine madness (theia mania), of which he cites four examples:

1. From Apollo, the prophetic madness;
2. From Dionysus, the initiatory or ritual madness;
3. From the Muses, the poetic madness;
4. From Aphrodite, erotic madness

As they must show that the madness of love is, indeed, sent by a god to benefit the lover and beloved in order to disprove the preceding speeches, Socrates embarks on a proof of the divine origin of this fourth sort of madness. It is a proof, he says, that will convince "the wise if not the clever". (Note: Phaedrus 245c)

==== The soul (245c–249d) ====
He begins by briefly proving the immortality of the soul. A soul is always in motion and as a self-mover has no beginning. A self-mover is itself the source of everything else that moves. So, by the same token, it cannot be destroyed. Bodily objects moved from the outside have no soul, while those that move from within have a soul. Moving from within, all souls are self-movers, and hence their immortality is necessary. (Note: Phaedrus 245c–e)

Then begins the famous chariot allegory. A soul, says Socrates, is like the "natural union of a team of winged horses and their charioteer". While the gods have two good horses, everyone else has a mixture: one is beautiful and good, while the other is neither. (Note: Phaedrus 246a–b)

As souls are immortal, those lacking bodies patrol all of heaven so long as their wings are in perfect condition. When a soul sheds its wings, it comes to earth and takes on an earthly body that then seems to move itself. (Note: Phaedrus 246c) These wings lift up heavy things to where the gods dwell and are nourished and grow in the presence of the wisdom, goodness, and beauty of the divine. However, foulness and ugliness make the wings shrink and disappear. (Note: Phaedrus 246d–e)

In heaven, he explains, there is a procession led by Zeus, who looks after everything and puts things in order. All the gods, except for Hestia, follow Zeus in this procession. While the chariots of the gods are balanced and easier to control, other charioteers must struggle with their bad horse, which will drag them down to earth if it has not been properly trained. (Note: Phaedrus 246e–247b) As the procession works its way upward, it eventually makes it up to the high ridge of heaven where the gods take their stands and are taken in a circular motion to gaze at all that is beyond heaven. (Note: Phaedrus 247b–c)

What is outside of heaven, says Socrates, is quite difficult to describe, lacking color, shape, or solidity, as it is the subject of all true knowledge, visible only to intelligence. (Note: Phaedrus 247c) The gods delight in these things and are nourished. Feeling wonderful, they are taken around until they make a complete circle. On the way they are able to see Justice, Self-control, Knowledge, and other things as they are in themselves, unchanging. When they have seen all things and feasted on them, coming all the way around, they sink back down inside heaven. (Note: Phaedrus 247d–e)

The immortal souls that follow the gods most closely are able to just barely raise their chariots up to the rim and look out on reality. They see some things and miss others, having to deal with their horses; they rise and fall at varying times. Other souls, while straining to keep up, are unable to rise, and in noisy, sweaty discord they leave uninitiated, not having seen reality. Where they go after is then dependent on their own opinions, rather than the truth. Any soul that catches sight of any true thing is granted another circuit where it can see more; eventually, all souls fall back to earth. Those that have been initiated are put into varying human incarnations, depending on how much they have seen; those made into philosophers and artists have seen the most, while kings, statesmen, doctors, prophets, poets, manual laborers, sophists, and tyrants follow respectively. (Note: Phaedrus 247e–248e)

Souls then begin cycles of reincarnation. It generally takes 10,000 years for a soul to grow its wings and return to where it came, but philosophers, after having chosen such a life three times in a row, grow their wings and return after only 3,000 years. This is because they have seen the most and always keep its memory as close as possible, and philosophers maintain the highest level of initiation. They ignore human concerns and are drawn towards the divine. While ordinary people rebuke them for this, they are unaware that the lover of wisdom is possessed by a god. This is the fourth sort of madness, that of love. (Note: Phaedrus 248e–249d)

==== The madness of love (249d–257b) ====
One comes to manifest this sort of love after seeing beauty here on earth and being reminded of true beauty as it was seen beyond heaven. When reminded, the wings begin to grow back, but as they are not yet able to rise, the afflicted gaze aloft and pay no attention to what goes on below, bringing on the charge of madness. This is the best form that possession by a god can take, for all those connected to it. (Note: Phaedrus 249d–e)

When one is reminded of true beauty by the sight of a beautiful boy, he is called a lover. While all have seen reality, as they must have to be human, not all are so easily reminded of it. Those that can remember are startled when they see a reminder, and are overcome with the memory of beauty. (Note: Phaedrus 250a)

Beauty, he states, was among the most radiant things to see beyond heaven, and on earth it sparkles through vision, the clearest of our senses. Some have not been recently initiated, and mistake this reminder for beauty itself and only pursue desires of the flesh. This pursuit of pleasure, then, even when manifested in the love of beautiful bodies, is not "divine" madness, but rather just having lost one's head. The recent initiates, on the other hand, are overcome when they see a bodily form that has captured true beauty well, and their wings begin to grow. When this soul looks upon the beautiful boy it experiences the utmost joy; when separated from the boy, intense pain and longing occur, and the wings begin to harden. Caught between these two feelings, the lover is in utmost anguish, with the boy the only doctor for the pain. (Note: Phaedrus 250d–252b)

Socrates then returns to the myth of the chariot. The charioteer is filled with warmth and desire as he gazes into the eyes of the one he loves. The good horse is controlled by its sense of shame, but the bad horse, overcome with desire, does everything it can to go up to the boy and suggest to it the pleasures of sex. The bad horse eventually wears out its charioteer and partner, and drags them towards the boy; yet when the charioteer looks into the boy's face, his memory is carried back to the sight of the forms of beauty and self-control he had with the gods, and pulls back violently on the reins. As this occurs over and over, the bad horse eventually becomes obedient and finally dies of fright when seeing the boy's face, allowing the lover's soul to follow the boy in reverence and awe. (Note: Phaedrus 253d–254e)

The lover now pursues the boy. As he gets closer to his quarry, and the love is reciprocated, the opportunity for sexual contact again presents itself. If the lover and beloved surpass this desire they have won the "true Olympic Contests"; it is the perfect combination of human self-control and divine madness, and after death, their souls return to heaven. (Note: Phaedrus 255e–256b) Those who give in do not become weightless, but they are spared any punishment after their death, and will eventually grow wings together when the time comes. (Note: Phaedrus 256b–e)

A lover's friendship is divine, Socrates concludes, while that of a non-lover offers only cheap, human dividends, and tosses the soul about on earth for 9,000 years. He apologizes to the gods for the previous speeches, and Phaedrus joins him in the prayer. (Note: Phaedrus 256e–257c)

=== Discussion of rhetoric and writing (257c–279c) ===
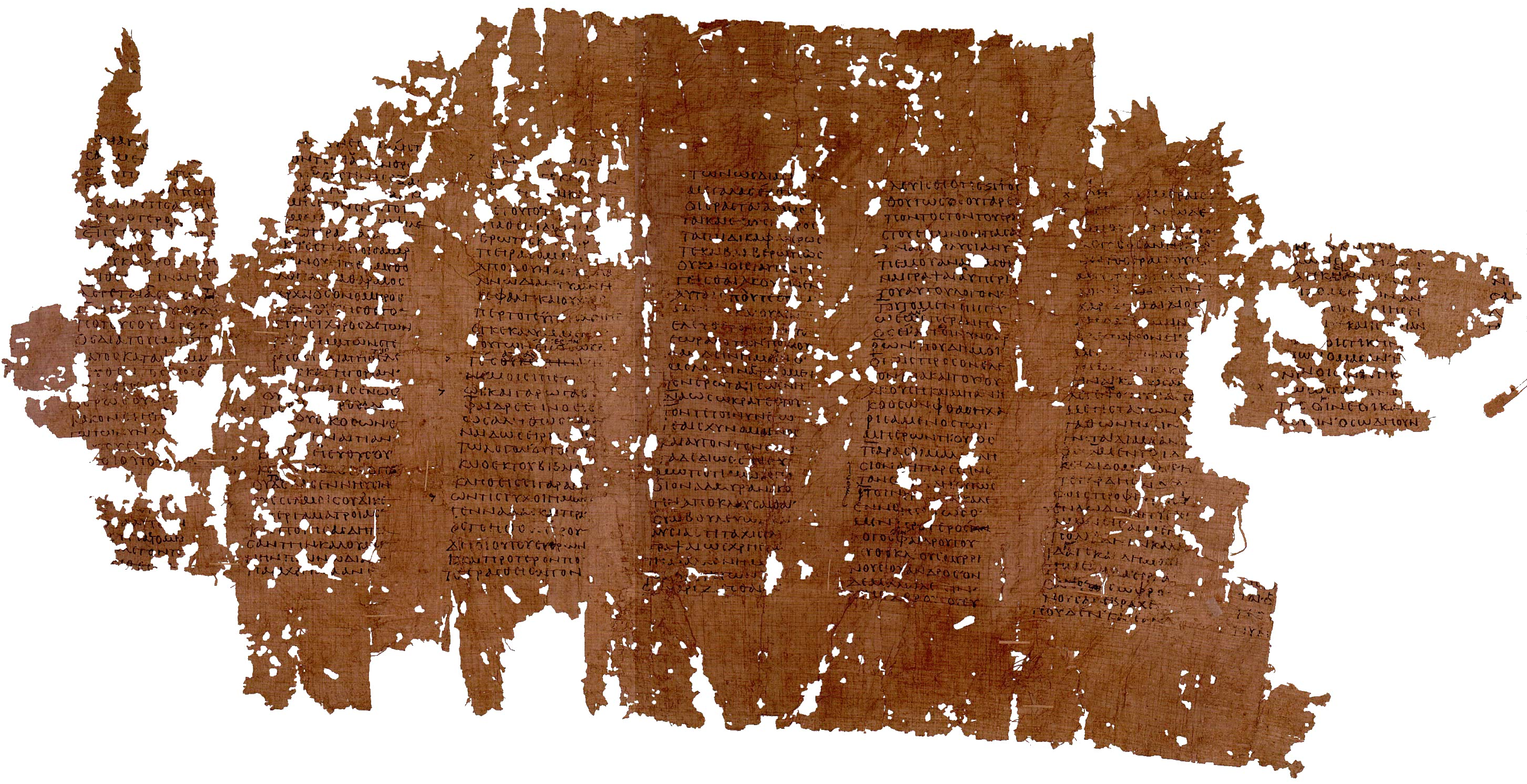
Fragments of a papyrus roll of the Phaedrus from the 2nd century AD

After Phaedrus concedes that this speech was certainly better than any Lysias could compose, they begin a discussion of the nature and uses of rhetoric itself. After showing that speech making itself isn't something reproachful, and that what is truly shameful is to engage in speaking or writing shamefully or badly, Socrates asks what distinguishes good from bad writing, and they take this up. (Note: Phaedrus 258d)

Phaedrus claims that to be a good speechmaker, one does not need to know the truth of what he is speaking on, but rather how to properly persuade, (Note: Phaedrus 260a) persuasion being the purpose of speechmaking and oration. Socrates first objects that an orator who does not know bad from good will, in Phaedrus's words, harvest "a crop of really poor quality". Yet Socrates does not dismiss the art of speechmaking. Rather, he says, it may be that even one who knew the truth could not produce conviction without knowing the art of persuasion; (Note: Phaedrus 260d) on the other hand, "as the Spartan said, there is no genuine art of speaking without a grasp of the truth, and there never will be". (Note: Phaedrus 260e)

To acquire the art of rhetoric, then, one must make systematic divisions between two different kinds of things: one sort, like "iron" and "silver", suggests the same to all listeners; the other sort, such as "good" or "justice", lead people in different directions. (Note: Phaedrus 263b) Lysias failed to make this distinction, and accordingly, failed to even define what "love" itself is in the beginning; the rest of his speech appears thrown together at random, and is, on the whole, very poorly constructed. (Note: Phaedrus 263e–264b) Socrates then goes on to say,

"Every speech must be put together like a living creature, with a body of its own; it must be neither without head nor without legs; and it must have a middle and extremities that are fitting both to one another and to the whole work." (Note: Phaedrus 264c)

Socrates's speech, on the other hand, starts with a thesis and proceeds to make divisions accordingly, finding divine love, and setting it out as the greatest of goods. And yet, they agree, the art of making these divisions is dialectic, not rhetoric, and it must be seen what part of rhetoric may have been left out. (Note: Phaedrus 266c)

When Socrates and Phaedrus proceed to recount the various tools of speechmaking as written down by the great orators of the past, starting with the "Preamble" and the "Statement Facts" and concluding with the "Recapitulation", Socrates states that the fabric seems a little threadbare. (Note: Phaedrus 266d–268a) He goes on to compare one with only knowledge of these tools to a doctor who knows how to raise and lower a body's temperature but does not know when it is good or bad to do so, stating that one who has simply read a book or come across some potions knows nothing of the art. (Note: Phaedrus 268a–c) One who knows how to compose the longest passages on trivial topics or the briefest passages on topics of great importance is similar, when he claims that to teach this is to impart the knowledge of composing tragedies; if one were to claim to have mastered harmony after learning the lowest and highest notes on the lyre, a musician would say that this knowledge is what one must learn before one masters harmony, but it is not the knowledge of harmony itself. (Note: Phaedrus 268c–e) This, then, is what must be said to those who attempt to teach the art of rhetoric through "Preambles" and "Recapitulations"; they are ignorant of dialectic, and teach only what is necessary to learn as preliminaries. (Note: Phaedrus 269b–c)

They go on to discuss what is good or bad in writing. Socrates tells a brief legend, critically commenting on the gift of writing from the Egyptian god Theuth to King Thamus, who was to disperse Theuth's gifts to the people of Egypt. After Theuth remarks on his discovery of writing as a remedy for the memory, Thamus responds that its true effects are likely to be the opposite; it is a remedy for reminding, not remembering, he says, with the appearance but not the reality of wisdom. Future generations will hear much without being properly taught, and will appear wise but not be so, making them difficult to get along with. (Note: Phaedrus 274e–275b)

No written instructions for an art can yield results clear or certain, Socrates states, but rather can only remind those that already know what writing is about. (Note: Phaedrus 275d–e) Furthermore, writings are silent; they cannot speak, answer questions, or come to their own defense. (Note: Phaedrus 275e)

Accordingly, the legitimate sister of this is, in fact, dialectic; it is the living, breathing discourse of one who knows, of which the written word can only be called an image. (Note: Phaedrus 276a) On the one who knows uses the art of dialectic rather than writing, Socrates remarks:

"The dialectician chooses a proper soul and plants and sows within it discourse accompanied by knowledge—discourse capable of helping itself as well as the man who planted it, which is not barren but produces a seed from which more discourse grows in the character of others. Such discourse makes the seed forever immortal and renders the man who has it happy as any human being can be." (Note: Phaedrus 276e–277a)

== Interpretations and themes ==
=== Chariot allegory ===
Plato paints the picture of a charioteer driving a chariot pulled by two winged horses:

"First the charioteer of the human soul drives a pair, and secondly one of the horses is noble and of noble breed, but the other quite the opposite in breed and character. Therefore in our case the driving is necessarily difficult and troublesome."

The charioteer represents intellect, reason, or the part of the soul that must guide the soul to truth; one horse represents rational or moral impulse or the positive part of passionate nature (e.g., righteous indignation); while the other represents the soul's irrational passions, appetites, or concupiscent nature. The charioteer directs the entire chariot/soul, trying to stop the horses from going different ways, and to proceed towards enlightenment.

Plato describes a "great circuit" which souls make as they follow the gods in the path of enlightenment. Those few souls which are fully enlightened are able to see the world of the forms in all its glory. Some souls have difficulty controlling the black horse, even with the help of the white horse. They may bob up into the world of the forms, but at other times enlightenment is hidden from them. If overcome by the black horse or forgetfulness, the soul loses its wings and is pulled down to earth.

Should that happen, the soul is incarnated into one of nine kinds of person, according to how much truth it beheld. In order of decreasing levels of truth seen, the categories are: (1) philosophers, lovers of beauty, or someone musical and erotic; (2) law-abiding kings or civic leaders; (3) politicians, estate-managers or businessmen; (4) ones who specialize in bodily health; (5) prophets or mystery cult participants; (6) poets or imitative artists; (7) craftsmen or farmers; (8) sophists or demagogues; and (9) tyrants.

One need not suppose that Plato intended this as a literal discussion of metempsychosis or reincarnation: perhaps he meant it figuratively.

Plato does not see the human soul as a sort of patchwork of emotions and concepts; this differs from the views of many philosophers of his time. Instead he views the soul as a sort of composite, in which many different elements blend together and affect each other. He uses the allegory of the charioteer to explain that love is a reflection of love of the forms, and is thus a "divine madness," a theia mania.

=== Madness and divine inspiration ===
In the Phaedrus, Socrates makes the rather bold claim that some of life's greatest blessings flow from madness; and he clarifies this later by noting that he is referring specifically to madness inspired by the gods. Phaedrus is Plato's only dialogue that shows Socrates outside the city of Athens, out in the country. It was believed that spirits and nymphs inhabited the country, and Socrates specifically points this out after the long palinode with his comment about listening to the cicadas. After originally remarking that "landscapes and trees have nothing to teach me, only people do", (Note: Phaedrus 230d) Socrates goes on to make constant remarks concerning the presence and action of the gods in general, nature gods such as Pan and the nymphs, and the Muses, in addition to the unusually explicit characterization of his own daemon. The importance of divine inspiration is demonstrated in its connection with the importance of religion, poetry and art, and above all else, love. Eros, much like in the Symposium, is contrasted from mere desire of the pleasurable and given a higher, heavenly function. Unlike in the Ion, a dialogue dealing with madness and divine inspiration in poetry and literary criticism, madness here must go firmly hand in hand with reason, learning, and self-control in both love and art. This rather bold claim has puzzled readers and scholars of Plato's work for centuries because it clearly shows that Socrates saw genuine value in the irrational elements of human life, despite many other dialogues that show him arguing that one should pursue beauty and that wisdom is the most beautiful thing of all.

=== Pederasty ===
The pederastic relationships common to ancient Greek life are also at the fore of this dialogue. In addition to theme of love discussed in the speeches, seeming double entendres and sexual innuendo are abundant; we see the flirtation between Phaedrus and Socrates. As Phaedrus encourages Socrates to make his first speech, Phaedrus makes a remark at noon-time that Socrates should not leave as the heat has not passed and it is "straight-up, as they say," Socrates wishes to know what Phaedrus is holding under his cloak, and so on. The relationships discussed in the speeches are explicitly pederastic. And yet, this is tempered in various ways; role reversals between lover and beloved are constant, as they are in the Symposium. Socrates, ostensibly the lover, exhorts Phaedrus to lead the way at various times, and the dialogue ends with Socrates and Phaedrus leaving as "friends": equals, rather than partaking in the lover/beloved relationship inherent in Greek pederasty. In the beginning, they sit themselves under a chaste tree, which is precisely what its name suggests—often known as "monk's pepper", it was used by monks to decrease sexual urges and is believed to be an antaphrodisiac. Notably, Socrates sees the pederastic relationship as ideally devoid of sexual consummation; rather than being used for sexual pleasure, the relationship is a form of divine madness, helping both lover and beloved to grow and reach the divine.

=== Rhetoric, philosophy, and art ===
The Phaedrus also gives us much in the way of explaining how art should be practiced. The discussion of rhetoric, the proper practice of which is found to actually be philosophy, has many similarities with Socrates's role as a "midwife of the soul" in the Theaetetus; the dialectician, as described, is particularly resonant. To practice the art, one must have a grasp of the truth and a detailed understanding of the soul in order to properly persuade. Moreover, one must have an idea of what is good or bad for the soul and, as a result, know what the soul should be persuaded towards. To have mastered the tools of an art is not to have mastered the art itself, but only its preliminaries. This is much like the person who claims to have mastered harmony after learning the highest and lowest notes of the lyre. To practice an art, one must know what that art is for and what it can help one achieve.

The role of divine inspiration in philosophy must also be considered; the philosopher is struck with the fourth kind of madness, that of love, and it is this divine inspiration that leads him and his beloved towards the good—but only when tempered with self-control.

Writing, examined separately but ultimately equated with philosophy and rhetoric, is somewhat deprecated; it is stated that writing can do little but remind those who already know. Unlike dialectic and rhetoric, writing cannot be tailored to specific situations or students; the writer does not have the luxury of examining his reader's soul in order to determine the proper way to persuade. When attacked it cannot defend itself, and is unable to answer questions or refute criticism. As such, the philosopher uses writing "for the sake of amusing himself" and other similar things rather than for teaching others. A writer, then, is only a philosopher when he can himself argue that his writing is of little worth, among other requirements.

This final critique of writing with which the dialogue concludes seems to be one of the more interesting facets of the conversation for those who seek to interpret Plato in general; Plato, of course, comes down to us through his numerous written works, and philosophy today is concerned almost purely with the reading and writing of written texts. It seems proper to recall that Plato's ever-present protagonist and ideal man, Socrates, fits Plato's description of the dialectician perfectly, and never wrote a thing.

There is an echo of this point of view in the Seventh Letter, wherein Plato (or the pseudo-Platonic author) says not to write down things of importance. (Note: Plato, Seventh Epistle, "Therefore every man of worth, when dealing with matters of worth, will be far from exposing them to ill feeling and misunderstanding among men by committing them to writing.")

=== Soul: soul-leading; life as self-motion; self-motion and intelligence ===
Jessica Moss has argued that the entire unity of the Phaedrus is assured by the motif of soul-leading. The discussion of rhetoric, for instance, features the orator leading the soul to some decision or course of action. Socrates' great myth illustrates this motif most clearly when the soul is depicted as a charioteer and its horses, being led around a heavenly circuit. This is the occasion for the first appearance in Plato's dialogues of the prominent Platonic doctrine that life is motion: the soul, being the principle (or source) of life, is that which moves itself, as opposed to inanimate objects that require an external source of motion to move them. The view that life is self-motion and that the soul is a self-mover is used by Plato to guarantee the immortality of the soul, making this a novel argument for the soul's immortality not found in the Phaedo. Plato relies, further, on the view that the soul is a mind in order to explain how its motions are possible: Plato combines the view that the soul is a self-mover with the view that the soul is a mind in order to explain how the soul can move things in the first place (e.g., how it can move the body to which it is attached in life). Souls move things by means of their thoughts.

== In popular culture ==
- In Thomas Mann's novella Death in Venice, the narrator's young love Tadzio is associated with Phaedrus.
- French composer Erik Satie scored part of Phaedrus in the second movement of his 1919 work Socrate.
- In Mary Renault's 1953 novel The Charioteer, a text of Phaedrus is passed among the characters (gay men during World War II) and the image of the charioteer and his white and black horses recurs as the protagonist struggles to choose between consummated and unconsummated love.
- In a key scene from the film adaptation of Maurice, students, including Maurice, attend Dean Cornwallis's translation class in which two undergraduates orally translate into English the text (based on) Phaedrus (Stephanus 251a, 255a–e), during which the Dean instructs one to "Omit the reference to the unspeakable vice of the Greeks".
- The 2016 film, Knight of Cups by Terrence Malick is inspired, in part, by Phaedrus.
- In Robert M. Pirsig's fictionalized autobiographical novel Zen and the Art of Motorcycle Maintenance, Pirsig refers to his past self from before undergoing electroconvulsive therapy in the third person and using the name "Phaedrus," intended to reflect his opposition to certain educational and philosophical ideas. The character reappears in the follow-up Lila: An Inquiry into Morals.
- In Virginia Woolf's 1922 novel Jacob's Room, Jacob reads Phaedrus alone in his room after a visit to the "enormous mind," as Woolf characterizes the British Museum.
- In Wes Anderson's film The French Dispatch, the introduction to "Revisions to a Manifesto" has speech similar to that found in Phaedrus.
- Dr. Damian Milton, an autistic British psychologist, quoted paragraph 263 & 264 of Phaedrus in his seminal academic papers about double empathy problem.

== Texts and translations ==
- Jowett translation at StandardEbooks
- Greek text at Perseus
- Plato & Nichols, J. H. (tr. and ed.). Phaedrus. Cornell University Press. (1998).
- Plato: Euthyphro, Apology, Crito, Phaedo, Phaedrus. Greek with translation by Harold N. Fowler. Loeb Classical Library 36. Harvard Univ. Press (originally published 1914).
- Fowler translation at Perseus
- Plato. Opera, volume II. Oxford Classical Texts. ISBN 978-0198145417
- Plato. Complete Works. Hackett, 1997. ISBN 978-0872203495
- Plato. Phaedrus (Scully Edition). Focus Philosophical Library, 2003. ISBN 978-0941051545

== See also ==
- The Symposium
- The Republic
- The Gorgias
- Allegory of the cave
- Platonism
- Ratha Kalpana
- Id, ego, and super-ego
- Jonathan Haidt
- Allegorical interpretations of Plato
- Katha Upanishad
- The Theory of Forms
- Hyperuranion
- Pharmakon
- Divine Madness in Ancient Greece and Rome: theia mania
- Plato's unwritten doctrines, for the Phaedrus, criticism of writing, and Plato's esotericism
