= Maitrayaniya Upanishad =

One of the ancient Sanskrit scriptures of Hinduism

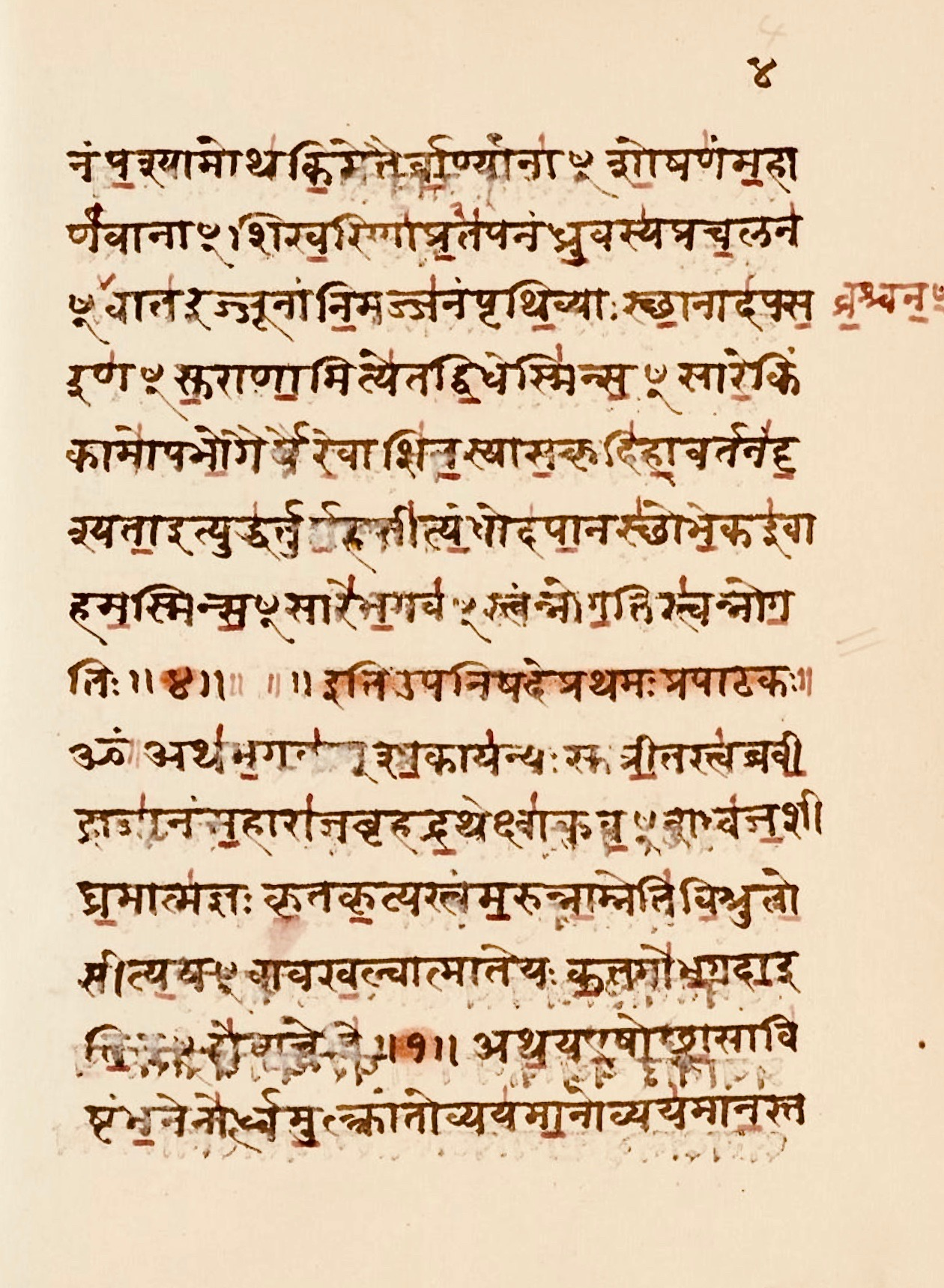
A page of the Maitrayaniya Upanishad manuscript found in Pune, Maharashtra (Sanskrit, Devanagari)

The Maitrayaniya Upanishad (Sanskrit: मैत्रायणीय उपनिषद्, Maitrāyaṇīya Upaniṣad) is an ancient Sanskrit text that is embedded inside the Yajurveda. It is also known as the Maitri Upanishad (Sanskrit: मैत्री उपनिषद्, Maitrī Upaniṣad), and is listed as number 24 in the Muktika canon of 108 Upanishads.

The Maitrayaniya Upanishad is associated with the Maitrayanas school of the Yajurveda. It is a part of the "black" Yajurveda, with the term "black" implying "the un-arranged, motley collection" of content in Yajurveda, in contrast to the "white" (well arranged) Yajurveda where Brihadaranyaka Upanishad and Isha Upanishad are embedded. The chronology of Maitrayaniya Upanishad is contested, but generally accepted to be a late period Upanishadic composition.

The Maitrayaniya Upanishad consists of seven Prapathakas (lessons). The first Prapathaka is introductory, the next three are structured in a question-answer style and discuss metaphysical questions relating to Atman (Self), while the fifth to seventh Prapathaka are supplements. However, several manuscripts discovered in different parts of India contain lesser number of Prapathakas, with a Telugu language version showing just four, and another Burnell version showing just one section. The content and structure of the Upanishad is also different in various manuscript recensions, suggesting that the Upanishad was extensively interpolated and expanded over a period of time. The common kernel of the Upanishad across different recensions, states Max Muller, is a reverence for Self, that can be summarized in a few words as, "(Man) is the Self – the immortal, the fearless, the Brahman".

The Maitri Upanishad is an important ancient text notable, in its expanded version, for its references to theories also found in Buddhism, elements of the Samkhya and Yoga schools of Hinduism, as well as the Ashrama system. The text is also notable for its practice of Anyatrapyuktam (or Ityevam Hyaha), that is being one of the earliest known Sanskrit texts that embedded quotes with credits and frequent citations to more ancient Sanskrit texts.

== Etymology ==
The etymological root of the Maitrayaniya Upanishad is unclear. This has historically led to a variety of names and spellings for this Upanishad.

Maitra (Sanskrit: मैत्र) and Maitri (मैत्री) are related words which literally mean "kindly, benevolent, good will, amity, friend of all creatures". The likely root for the Upanishad is probably the name of an ancient Indian scholar, Maitra, sometimes spelled Maitri or Maitreya, giving the text the alternate name of Maitri or Maitra Upanishad. The ancient scholar is also credited with a school of thought, thus giving the text the name Maitrayaniya Upanishad. Other names for this text include Maitrayani Upanishad (मैत्रायणि उपनिषद्), Maitrayana Upanishad, Maitrayaniya-brahmana Upanishad, Sriyagussakhayam Maitrayaniya-brahmana Upanishad, Maitreyopanishad and Maitrayaniyopanishad.

== Chronology ==
The Maitrayaniya Upanishad offers no firm evidence as to its date. But on various internal criteria such as its passages on yoga and its doctrinal heterogeneity, scholarly consensus places its composition in late 1st millennium BCE or even slightly later, likely after Atharva Veda texts such as the Mundaka Upanishad and Prashna Upanishad. But its precise chronology is unclear and contested. The chronology is difficult to resolve because all opinions rest on scanty evidence, an analysis of archaism, style and repetitions across texts, driven by assumptions about likely evolution of ideas, and on presumptions about which philosophy might have influenced which other Indian philosophies. van Buitenen identified at least five compositional layers in the work, composed at different times by different groups or individuals.

When discussing the chronology of the Upaniṣads, Olivelle did not specifically mention the Maitri Upanishad but noted that the last group of principal Upanishads "cannot be much older than the beginning of the common era." Mahony suggests an earlier date, placing Prashna along with Maitri and Mandukya Upanishads, as texts that probably emerged about early fourth century BCE. Jayatilleke states, "Buddhism is not far removed in time from, though it is prior to, the Maitri Upanishad". Nakamura states that "although Buddhistic influence can be seen in the Maitri Upanishad (from words used), the particular terms and modes of expression of Mahayana Buddhism do not yet appear (in it)".

Phillips, in contrast, lists Maitri Upanishad before and about the time the first Buddhist Pali canonical texts were composed. Ranade posits a view similar to Phillips, placing Maitri's chronological composition in the fifth group of ancient Upanishads and last of the Principal Upanishads. Cowell too considers Maitri Upanishad as late era Upanishad, with its later sections comparatively modern, because of the structural and style differences within texts, inconsistencies in Poona manuscript, Calcutta (Kolkata) manuscript, Eckstein manuscript, Burnell manuscript and other manuscripts, and because some version of the manuscripts insert quotes from Vaishnavism.

Deussen states that the Upanishad is chronologically significant because its author(s) takes for granted the concepts and ideas found in Samkhya and Yoga schools of Hinduism, which must have been established by the time Maitri Upanishad was composed.

== Structure ==
The extant recension of the text consists seven Prapāṭhakas (lessons), of which several sections are Khilas (appendices, supplements) added later. The last two are called as khila by medieval era Indian scholar Ramatirtha. Others consider the last three sections as supplements and appendices. Other discovered manuscript versions of the Maitri Upanishad present different number of sections, ranging from 1 to 4, without any appendices. There are also differences in style, structure and content among the discovered manuscripts when the text contains the same number of sections.

The text is a prose style Upanishad, with a motley collection of different sized paragraphs. The first section has four paragraphs, the second has seven, the third presents five paragraphs, while the fourth section contains six. As appendices, the fifth lesson has two paragraphs, while the sixth Prapathaka is the longest section with thirty eight paragraphs. The last supplementary section, or the seventh Prapāṭhaka has eleven paragraphs some with many sub-paragraphs.

The Maitrayaniya Upanishad is embedded after the Brahmana text of Yajur Veda, and in its opening passages refers to rituals contained therein. It contextually belongs to the Sannyasa Upanishads corpus. Hume includes it among his list of "Thirteen Principal Upanishads".

== Contents ==
Maitri Upanishad deals with the concept and nature of Atman (Self), the question of "how is joy possible?" and "how one can achieve moksha (liberation)?"; in later sections it offers a debate on possible answers.

=== Meditation of Self is the essence of religious activity - First Prapathaka ===
The text begins with the following prelude,

The performance of all the sacrifices, described in the Maitrayana-Brahmana, is to lead up in the end to a knowledge of Brahman, to prepare a man for meditation. Therefore, let such man, after he has laid those fires, meditate on the Self, to become complete and perfect. But who is to be meditated on?

— Maitri Upanishad,

The above prelude is followed by an answer, offered as a tale of a king named Brihadratha who renounces his kingdom, lives an austere life and therewith seeks the knowledge of the eternal, the Self. Sage Śākāyanya appears before the king. The king admits, "I lack the knowledge of Self, you know the essence of Self", so please teach me. In the resulting reply, the sage Śākāyana first claims that the "seeking the knowledge of Atman" was a practice of the past, it is difficult and not in vogue, then urges the king to ask something else". The king insists, by asking a series of metaphysical questions to the sage.

In this body infected with passions, anger, greed, delusion, fright, despondency, grudge, separation from what is dear and desirable, attachment to what is not desirable, hunger, thirst, old age, death, illness, sorrow and the rest - how can one experience only joy?

There are other great ones. We see the destruction of Gandharvas, Asuras, Yakshas, Rakshasas, Ganas, snakes and vampires. And what of these? The drying up of great oceans, the crumbling down of the mountains, the instability of the pole-star, the tearing of the wind-chords, the sinking down, the submergence of the earth, the tumbling down of the gods from their place - in a world in which such things occur, how can one experience only joy!

— Maitrayaniya Upanishad, I.3-4

The sage then shares with the king the philosophy of the Brahman (Universal Self, Cosmic Principle, Ultimate Reality), described in the next lessons. Paul Deussen states that parts of the above questions, on sorrow and frailty of human life is found in the oldest Upanishads of Hinduism, for example in chapters 3.4, 3.5, 3.7, 3.28 and 4.4 of Brihadaranyaka Upanishad, yet its declamation in the question form above in Maitri Upanishad, mirrors those found in Buddhism and Samkhya school of Hinduism. It is likely, states Deussen, that these two philosophies influenced the formulation of these questions in the form presented in Maitri Upanishad.

=== Every individual has Self, which is serene, the highest light, the cosmic truth - Second Prapathaka ===
Sakayanya answers the king's question, in verse 2.2 of Maitri Upanishad, by asserting that Atman (Self) exists in every individual, and it is that inmost being which "moves about without moving" (exists everywhere), which dispels darkness of ignorance and error, which is serene, immortal, fearless and soaring for the highest light. The Maitri Upanishad states that this is the message of all Upanishads,

अथ खल्वियं ब्रह्मविद्या सर्वोपनिषद्विद्या वा राजन्नस्माकं भगवता मैत्रेयेण व्याख्याताहं ते

Now then, O king, this is the Brahman-knowledge, and the knowledge contained in all the Upanishads, which was taught to us by honorable Maitri. I shall tell it to thee.

— Maitri Upanishad 2.3,

Sage Sakayanya thereafter narrates an ancient dialogue between Vālakhilyas and Prajāpati Kratu, which is sourced from Rig Veda. The dialogue states that "man was created in the image of its creator, innately has all its powers, and is driven by it". The dialogue raises a series of metaphysical objections and inconsistencies with this premise, and then offers theories to resolve the what, how and why this is so.

The Maitrayaniya Upanishad states that the Prajapati (lord of creatures) divided himself fivefold and entered all creatures of the world. The divided parts are Prana, Apana, Samana, Udana and Vyana. Prana is upward breath, Apana is downward breath (exhale). Vyana holds the Prana and Apana in balance, giving strength to the whole body. Samana is that which carries gross food to Apana and then subtler food throughout the body. Udana is that which delivers food up and down the body from what has been eaten or drunk.

Now the Upamsu-vessel (or prana) depends on the Antaryama-vessel (apana) and the Antaryama-vessel (apana) on the Upamsu-vessel (prana), and between these two the self-resplendent (Self) produced heat. This heat is the purusha(person), and this purusha is Agni Vaisvanara. The Purusha resides within, assumes the nature of Buddhi (intellect, power to reason). However, having divided itself fivefold, its purpose unattained, it impulsively feels, "let me enjoy objects". It is distracted from its purpose, its Self. The Upanishad, thereafter recites the "parable of chariot" found in older Upanishads. Max Muller summarizes it as, "the perceptive organs are his reins, the active organs his horses, the body his chariot, the mind the charioteer, the whip being the temperament (emotions). Driven by that whip, his body goes round and round like a wheel driven by the potter. This body is made intelligent, and he (Atman) is the driver thereof." He experiences the fruits of his Karma, his personality the weaving of the three Guṇas (sattvam, rajas, tamas).

In essence, however, man seeks the true bliss, the immortal happiness, the resplendent contentment, the calm freedom that is his Self, states paragraph 2.7 of Maitri Upanishad. This Self of his is pure, unchanging, unmoving, undefilable, serenely calm constant, the spectator within him, the self-abiding. The Self is inherently good, enjoyer of Ṛta (that which is properly/excellently joined, natural perfection, harmonious, holistic, right, truth).

=== Human suffering, its causes and the nature of Selfs - Third Prapathaka ===
The third Prapathaka of Maitri Upanishad presents a theory of Self that is different from the Vedanta school of Hinduism, rather it resonates with its Samkhya school. It enumerates different types of Atman, the three Gunas and how these "qualities of personality" overwhelm him from his essential nature into egoistic life of cravings, the source of evil and sorrow in a man's life, and other terminology from the Samkhya philosophy.

The third Prapathaka opens with the question, "if Self is inherently great, then who is this Self that suffers from the 'bright and dark fruits' of karma, rebirth and is overcome by Dvandva (pairs of opposite such as heat and cold, health and disease, etc)?"

As answer, the Maitrayaniya Upanishad states that there is another, different Self, calling it Bhutatman (the elemental Self), which transmigrates. In paragraph 3.2, the Upanishad presents the "theory of gross elements and subtle elements" which combine to form Sarira (शरीर, body). The "elemental Self" resides in this body, and is overcome by prakrti guna (inner nature of an individual's personality). This, states the text, is cause of confusion, conflicting desires, unsteady behaviors and self-conceit. Man, because of this confusion, binds himself with suffering, just like a bird binds itself inside a net. Human suffering is the result of human actions (Karma) and complex interplay of human psychology (Guṇas). However, the "immortal Self" is, states the text, unaffected by the elemental Self's confusion and drifts. The third Prapathaka explains the two Self and human personalities using the metaphor of "fire, iron and forge" as follows,

He who acts, is the elemental Self; he who causes to act, is the inner man (immortal Self). Now as even a ball of iron, pervaded by fire, hammered by smiths, becomes manifold forms, thus the elemental Self, pervaded by inner man, hammered by guna (qualities, personality), becomes manifold. And as when the ball of iron is hammered, the fire is not overcome (unaffected), so the inner man is not overcome, only elemental Self is overcome.

— Maitri Upanishad 3.3

The Maitri Upanishad in paragraph 3.4 states that true essence of man is not his body, but his immortal Self. The elemental Self is mere reflection of his Gunas (psychology), a source of his suffering, which manifests itself as quality of Tamas (darkness), such as "confusion, fear, grief, sloth, carelessness, decay, sorrow, hunger, thirst, infidelity, anger, ignorance, cruelty, meanness, envy, shamelessness, pride, folly, dishonesty, arrogance, miserliness". The quality of Rajas () too, states the Upanishad, is a result of this interplay of overpowered elemental Self and guna, and lists the manifold manifestation of this as, "greed, covetousness, craving, possessiveness, unkindness, hatred, deceit, restlessness, mania, fickleness, wooing and impressing others, servitude, flattery, hedonism, gluttony, prodigality and peevishness". While the elemental Self is thus affected, the inner Self, the immortal Self, the inner spectator is unaffected, asserts the Upanishad.

=== Realization of True Self, union with Brahman - Fourth Prapathaka ===
The fourth Prapathaka begins with the question, "how can the elemental Self obtain union with the true Self"?

The Maitri Upanishad answers that the elemental Self is distracted, intoxicated and attached to numerous things in life, craving for false delights, which prevents its ability to know the true Self. The remedy for elemental Self, in order to realize the true Self, is to acquire the knowledge of the Veda, perform svadharma (one's duty) based on one's age, be part of Rta, devote oneself to Ashrama stage one is in. The Upanishad, in paragraph 4.3 acknowledges the inherent tension between ascetic life of renouncing society for Self-knowledge and the svadharma in each Ashrama stage of life with devotion to society. It calls asceticism qua asceticism wrong, and then immediately calls asceticism right, necessary and praises asceticism for the inner perfection and Self-knowledge it helps bring. The fourth prapathaka does not resolve the inherent conflict it acknowledges. In paragraph 4.4, the Upanishad asserts that meditation, austerities, perseverance and knowledge leads to Brahman state, of bliss that is imperishable, infinite and unchangeable. It is this union of Brahman that frees the true Self unto bliss.

=== Deity worship can be rewarding, but must be temporary, replaced with meditation and self knowledge - Fourth Prapathaka ===
In paragraph 4.5, the Maitrayaniya Upanishad presents the question as to which of the gods is best for worship. The text answers that they are merely forms of Brahman, that one should meditate upon, worship, yet ultimately deny them and reject the gods. They are means to man's liberation, which is obtained through Self meditation and in Self-knowledge. This is expounded on, as follows,

Agni (fire), Vayu (wind) and Aditya (sun),
Kala (time), Prana (breath), and Food,
Brahma, Rudra and Vishnu -
some meditate upon one, some upon another,
tell us which one is the best?

These are foremost forms of the supreme, the immortal, the bodiless Brahman. To whichever deity each man is attached, in its world he rejoices. Yet, it is said, this whole world is Brahman. These deities, which are its foremost forms, one should meditate upon, worship, but then deny (reject the gods' individuality). He thus unites with the universal, and attains union with the Self.

— Maitri Upanishad 4.5-4.6

Hume states that the construct of the question above is notable, as it thus incorporates the three triads of thought found in ancient Indian philosophies - the Vedic trinity, the philosophical trinity in different schools of Hinduism, as well as the Brahmanic trinity.

=== Appendix: Pantheistic Self and Samkhya theory of Gunas - Fifth Prapathaka ===
The fifth Prapathaka then presents a motley collection of a hymn and various theories, all focussed on the pantheistic premise that everything is manifested form of Cosmic Self, all is One Brahman-Atman.

A hymn, inserted into paragraph 5.1 and called the Kutsayana Hymn, states that the Self is the hidden unchanging reality, the tranquil, the unlimited, the one without beginning or end. The Self, states this pantheistic hymn, is Brahma, Vishnu, Rudra, Prajapati, Agni, Varuna, Vayu, Indra, Moon, Anna (Food), Yama, Earth. All life, all existence is manifold manifestation of the Self. The hymn calls the Self as Prabhu (Lord) of all pleasure and delight.

The paragraph 5.2 of the Upanishad asserts the Guna theory of Samkhya school of Hinduism. The text states that in the beginning the universe was darkness (Tamas) alone. The Brahman impelled Tamas to differentiate, thus arose passion (action qua action, Rajas). The Brahman impelled Rajas to continue differentiating, and thus arose purity (right action, truth, Sattva). These three Gunas reside in everything. The aspect of Brahman that characterizes Tamas is Rudra. The aspect of Brahman that characterizes Rajas is Brahma. The aspect of Brahman that characterizes Sattva is Vishnu. These threefold concepts have differentiated manifold into eightfold, elevenfold, into infinite number of parts, states the Upanishad. These, all creatures, and the Visva (विश्व, world, empirical universe) are manifestations of one Supreme Self, within and without. Self's existence is reflected by the development of goodness (virtues). It is this Self that is reflected in man, just like sun is reflected in different vessels of water, posits paragraph 5.2 of the fifth Prapathaka.

=== Appendix: Enumeration of Selfs - Sixth Prapathaka ===
The sixth Prapathaka enumerates Self into two, the one that is within each human being and one without that is in Sun. These correspond to two paths, one inner and one outer. The existence of inner Self can only be inferred, while the outer Self can be perceived. The outer Self is the evidence of the inner Self, and the inner Self is the evidence of the outer Self. In Paragraph 6.1, the Maitri Upanishad refers to more ancient texts of this teaching of Self and its relation to ethical life and introspective behavior, as follows,

कश्चिद्विद्वानपहतपाप्माऽक्षाध्यक्षोऽवदातमनास्तन्निष्ठ आवृत्तचक्षुः सो अन्तरात्म

Every man who knows, free of evil, master of his senses, purified in mind, steadfast in his Self, introspective, is He (Self, Atman).

— Maitri Upanishad 6.1

Just like in time (kala), the solar fire ultimately consumes all beings and the outer world as food, asserts the Upanishad, it is the man's Self that consumes inner food. The outer Self and inner Self are, assuredly, states the Upanishad, one and same thing. Man should meditate on both these Selfs with the symbol Om (ॐ), revere them through Vyahrtis and the Savitri verse, asserts paragraph 6.2 of the text.

=== Appendix: The symbol Om and its significance - Sixth Prapathaka ===
The significance of Om symbol is discussed in many Principal Upanishads, including the Maitri.

Om represents Brahman-Atman. The three roots (or the three-footed nature) of the word are A + U + M. The sound is the body of the Self, and it manifests in three ways: as the gender-endowed body - feminine, masculine, and neuter; as the light-endowed body - Agni, Vayu and Aditya; as the deity-endowed body - Brahma, Rudra and Vishnu; as the mouth-endowed body - Garhapatya, Dakshinagni and Ahavaniya; as the knowledge-endowed body - Rig, Saman and Yajur; as the world-endowed body - Bhūr, Bhuvaḥ and Svaḥ; as the time-endowed body - Past, Present and Future; as the heat-endowed body - Breath, Fire and Sun; as the growth-endowed body - Food, Water and Moon; as thought-endowed body - intellect, mind and psyche. Brahman exists in two forms - the material form and the immaterial formless form. The material form is changing, unreal. The immaterial formless isn't changing, real. The immortal formless is truth, the truth is the Brahman, the Brahman is the light, the light is the Sun which is the syllable Om as the Self.

The world is Om, its light is Sun and the Sun is also the light of the syllable Om. Meditating on Om, is acknowledging and meditating on the Brahman-Atman (Self).

Savitri prayer and meditation with the rising sun, a means to Self worship

Anyone who loves his Self, states paragraph 6.7 of the Upanishad, loves the Savitri – literally, that which "vivifies, ray of light that enlivens knowledge". The Sun is Savitri, and thus one who loves his Self, loves the splendor of the Sun. The text thereafter explains the meaning of Savitri verse from Rig Veda 3.62.10, its emphasis on "may the Sun inspire our thoughts, stimulate our thoughts". To think is to meditate, states paragraph 6.7 of Maitri Upanishad. To worship Sun, is to worship Self.

The sixth Prapathaka includes etymologies of six Sanskrit words, stating that these are all related to stimulating Self-knowledge. It is this Self, this Self that is the immortal inside man, the perceiver, thinker, goer, doer, evacuator, begetter, speaker, taster, smeller, seer, hearer, toucher and all-prevader. The Self underlies the senses yet is more than the sensory capabilities of man, it is pristine unity beyond cause, effect and action.

=== Appendix: Types of knowledge, all gods are nothing but Self, that Self is within each human being - Sixth Prapathaka ===
Knowledge is of two types, asserts the Maitri Upanishad: subjective and objective. The subjective knowledge is about the external world dependent on the person, the objective knowledge is about the Self and inner, hidden principles of the world. It is the Self of man that comes to know subjective and objective knowledge.

The Self of man is identical with various gods and powers, it is the deities Isana, Sambhu, Bhava, Rudra, Prajapati, Visvarij, Hiranyagarbha, Satyam, Prana, Hamsa, Sastri, Vishnu, Narayana, Arka, Savitri, Dhatri, Vidhatri, Samraj, Indra, Indu and Sun. It is this Self that is to be thought after, sought after. Man should find this Self within him.

=== Appendix: The metaphorical theory of food, of time - Sixth Prapathaka ===
Sections 6.9 through 6.17 of the Maitri Upanishad is motley collection of three parts, all relating to the metaphysical interpretation of food. This is connected with the much older metaphorical discussion of "food" in chapter 5 of the Chandogya Upanishad. Everything is food to everything else, and taking of food is described by the Upanishad as a form of worship, a sacrifice offered by the Self to the Self.

In the first part of discussing food, the section discusses the feeding of one's own body as a form of religious ritual, and includes a hymn that is "food prayer" and that urges Atman to gratify the reciter as well as gratify all creatures in the universe. In the second part, the Upanishad calls apparent form of Brahman as food, then differentiates between food and the eater of food, and metaphorically maps food all to the nature of existence, of Prakrti (nature) and Purusha (consciousness).

Out of food, creatures are born,
All those, who are on earth,
through food they live,
into it, they enter at last.

— Maitri Upanishad 6.11

In the third part, in paragraphs 6.11 to 6.17, the text states that food is the cause of all that is in space and hidden principles, then expands the idea to include time by calling Kala (Time) is the cause of food, and then celebrates Time as Brahman. Food, states the sixth Prapathaka, is the source of the world, Time is the origin of food, and Sun is the origin of Time. It symbolically maps the Time and Timeless as changing reality and the unchanging Brahman, respectively.

There is a motley collection of ideas in the discussion of Kala (Time), within the sixth Prapathaka of the Upanishad. For example, in section 6.14, it sets out to prove Time exists, acknowledges the difficulty in proving Time exists by Pramana (epistemology in Indian philosophy), then inserts a theory of inductive inference for epistemological proof as follows,

On account of subtleness of Time, this is the proof of its reality;
On account of it the Time is demonstrated.

Because without proof, the assumption which is to be proved, is not admissible;
But, that which is itself to be proved or demonstrated, when one comprehends it in its parts, becomes the ground of proof, through which it brings itself into consciousness (in the inductive way).

— Maitri Upanishad 6.14

The section includes the concept of Time and non-Time, calling these as two forms of Brahman, mirroring the Upanishad's earlier discussion of Material and non-Material universe. It defines non-Time as "what was there before the appearance of Sun", and Time as "what began with the appearance of Sun". Non-Time is indivisible, Time is divisible. Year is the Murti (idol) of time. Time ripens everything, asserts the Upanishad. Sun is the foundation for Time, Sun is the Self (the Atman) of Brahman. The Brahman is the eternal, the boundless, the unborn, the immeasurable, the infinite, that which existed before Time, the light in the Sun, the colors in the smokeless fire, and all are only that one, one alone.

=== Appendix: Yoga, Samkhya and Vaishnava doctrines - Sixth Prapathaka ===
Sections 6.18 through 6.30 of the Maitri Upanishad is another motley collection of various theories. The supplementary section starts with the theory of Yoga, as the way by which the highest human goal of Self-knowledge can be attained. Paul Deussen states that this highest goal is the knowledge of Atman (Self, one's inmost being), and with that knowledge realized, becoming one with the Atman. Along with Katha Upanishad and Shvetashvatara Upanishad, the Maitri Upanishad offers one of the oldest known descriptions of Yoga theory. The sixth Prapathaka enumerates six limbs, a shorter list than the eight limbs of Patanjali's Yogasutra. The identified Yoga steps for Self-knowledge in Maitrayaniya Upanishad are: Pranayama (regulation of breath), Pratyahara (withdrawal of senses inwards), Dhyana (meditation), Dharana (concentration of mind on one idea), Tarka (creative, contemplation of idea), Samadhi (absorption with the idea, a state of being one with the idea).

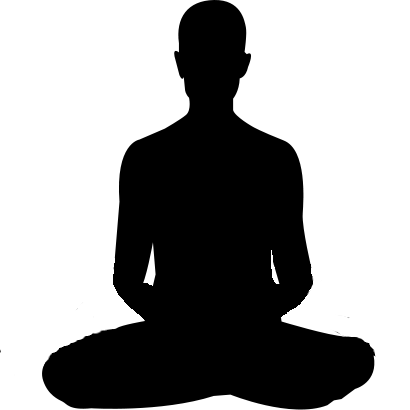
The sixth Prapathaka of Maitri Upanishad is one of the several ancient Indian texts that describe the theory of Yoga.

After enumerating the sixfold yoga, the Upanishad states that the path to Self-knowledge is yogic meditating on Self and Brahman. This meditation leads to the state that "unites everything in the eternal, highest Atman". The one who thus knows Atman, asserts the text, becomes innately one of goodness, liberated, limitless, blissful.

As birds and deer do not approach a burning mountain,
so faults never approach those who know Brahman.

— Maitri Upanishad 6.18

Through tranquility of his thought,
Karma, good and evil, he destroys,
with Self serene, residing in his Self,
Joy eternal he enjoys.

— Maitri Upanishad 6.20

In section 6.23, the Upanishad re-asserts that Brahman is the syllable Om, and then adds that Brahman is manifested in the name of Vishnu, recommending the worship of both. In section 6.30, the Maitri Upanishad acknowledges a debate, based on the Samkhya theories, whether it is the Prakrti or Purusha who attains moksha. The text asserts that it is Purusha, because man by default is controlled by his senses and mind, all emotions such as fear and bashfulness are products of a mind in bondage; man is what his mind is, and for freedom (moksha) man needs to recognize and know his Self.

=== Appendix: Self exists, it is everywhere - Sixth Prapathaka ===
In section 6.31, the Maitri Upanishad acknowledges concepts, such as Sūnya (voidness) found in Buddhism, in a form that suggests a challenge to its premise, as follows,

कतम आत्मेति योऽयं शुद्धः पूतः शून्यः शान्ता...

You ask: Which of them is Atman? (Answer:) He who has been described as pure, clean, void, quite...

— Maitri Upanishad 6.31

The text answers that Self exists, that reason, steadfastness, recollection, consciousness are related to Self, as plants are related to seeds, as smoke is related to flame and sparks to fire. The Self (Atman), states the Upanishad, is the source of all life-forces, all worlds, all the Vedas, all gods, all beings, all knowledge, all nature, all literature, all sciences, all explanations, all commentaries, it is in everything. The Upanishad (secret meaning) of the Self is that "it is the Reality of the realities".

=== Appendix: What a man thinks, that he becomes - Sixth Prapathaka ===
The goal of meditation, states Maitri Upanishad in section 6.34, is to reach liberation and tranquility of mind through Self-realization. This liberation is achieved through one's mind, by refining one's thoughts, through knowing Atman. The text includes a hymn, which in abridged form expresses these ideas as follows,

चित्तमेव हि संसारम्त त्प्रयत्नेन शोधयेत्य
च्चित्तस्तन्मयो भवति गुह्यमेतत्सनातनम्

Mind alone is the Saṁsāra, man should strive to purify his thoughts,
what a man thinks that he becomes, this is the eternal mystery.

— Maitri Upanishad 6.34

The mind of man, states the Upanishad, is the cause of his bondage and his freedom. The one whose mind is controlled by objects of sense is unfree, the one whose mind is guided by his Self is free (mukti).

=== Appendix: Self is unlimited and there is Oneness in the whole world - Seventh Prapathaka ===
The seventh Prapathaka of Maitrayaniya Upanishad states that the Self is "the inmost being of everything", it is unlimited and it is manifestation of one Brahman. It is Self, it is deep, it is pure, it is brilliant. The Self is tranquil, it is fearless, it is sorrowless, it is indescribable joy. It is intelligent, it is patient, it is truth, it is harmony. It is self-dependent, it is steadfast, it is immortal, it is without limits. It is Vishnu, it is Shiva, it is Aditya, it is Indra. It is everywhere, it is in creatures, it is in nature, it is in music. It is in gods, it is in seasons, it is in planets, it is in hymns. It is the Self, it is the Lord, it manifests in many, they are all one and the same.

=== Appendix: Beware of false teachers and non-Vedic doctrines; seek your own truth - Seventh Prapathaka ===
The final supplement of the Maitri Upanishad is a polemic against philosophies that declared antagonism to the Vedic teachings and its doctrine of Self. The section does not name any specific philosophy, but scholars have included Carvakas and Buddhism among the likely candidates. Paul Deussen states that the description though probable, is not concrete enough to prove that this section targets Buddhism. Max Muller expresses stronger doubts that the target was Buddhism. Jayatilleke, on the other hand, states that Buddhism is the likely target.

The paragraph eight of seventh Prapathaka opens by stating that there are hindrances to knowledge, and it is false teaching by those who continually beg, preach hedonism, wear red robes, ear rings and skulls, rogues as religious mendicants, who "for a price, offer that they can remove the evil influences of spirits, demons, ghosts, goblins and the like". In this group of false teachers, are others who misrepresent Vedas, have developed the strategy of deceptive circular arguments, false claims, faulty reasoning and irrational examples against the Vedic literature. All false teachers declare good to be evil, evil to be good, knowledge to be ignorance, and ignorance to be knowledge. They compel a dharma that destroys Vedas and other Sastras (scriptures, sacred books). One must not associate with these people, states the text, because they are robbers and love to oppress the believers in the Veda. The text quotes a passage to express its sentiment as follows,

By the jugglery of a doctrine that denies the Self,
By false comparisons and proofs,
Disturbed, the world does not discern,
What is the difference between knowledge and ignorance.

— Maitri Upanishad 7.8

In sections 7.9 and 7.10, the Upanishad refers to Katha Upanishad, and recommends that man should seek to know both knowledge and non-knowledge, the real and the delusion, the truth and untruth. Don't be "like blind men led by one who is himself blind", states the Maitri Upanishad.

== Similarities and differences with Buddhist teachings ==
The Maitri Upanishad shows signs of influence, or at least awareness of Buddhist teachings. Rhys Davis, about a 100 years ago, stated that Maitri Upanishad is the earliest Sanskrit literary usage of the term 'samadhi', a word also found in early texts of Buddhism. However, the concept of meditation and union is far older than the known literally use of the term Samadhi. The idea of "union", expressed with terms such Samadhi-root or related words, occur in Brihadaranyaka Upanishad, the oldest and longest Upanishad of the Hinduism. There are many other words and ideas that are shared between Maitri Upanishad and earliest known Buddhist texts.

Maitri Upanishad explicitly mentions, in seventh Prapathaka, a sect of thought whose teachers wear "reddish robe" (kasaya–), who deny the "existence of Self" premise (nairatmyavada–), preach a "dharma destructive of Vedas and Upanishads" (vedadisastra himsaka dharmabhidhyanam–) and whose goal is hedonistic "attainment of pleasure" (ratimatram phalam asya–). This sect reference could potentially be Carvakas, Ajivakas, Buddhism, Jainism or another unknown sect of thought that existed in ancient India. Jayatilleke states that this reference in Maitri Upanishad is likely to be to the Buddhists since,

1. Ajivikas or Jainism upheld the belief in Self, which the Buddhists explicitly rejected
2. Carvakas did not value dharma, while Buddhists were referred to as dharmavadin by opposing schools of thought.
3. Buddhists were strongly accused of being hedonists at this time.
4. Dhammapada seems to regard red robes as a distinct attire of Buddhist monks.

Jayatilleke additionally notes that there are many words as well as ideas such as the contemplation of the organic substances of the body and brahma-kosa theory in the sixth Prapathaka of this Upanishad that has "a Buddhist flavor".

Despite the similarities in words and some ideas, the teachings in the Upanishads of Hinduism, including Maitrayaniya Upanishad, however, are founded on the premise that "the Self and Brahman exists", and these texts discuss the paths to know, realize one's Self and Brahman. This makes the fundamental premise of Maitrayaniya and other Upanishads of Hinduism distinctly different from Buddhism's key premise that there is "no Self, no Soul".

=== Anatman and Niratman ===
The term niratman appears in the Maitrayaniya Upanishad such as in verses 6.20, 6.21 and 7.4. Niratman literally means "selfless". The verses 6.22 and 6.23 discuss sound-Brahman (Om, sabda-brahman, lower Brahman) and soundless-Brahman (empty, asabda-brahman, higher Brahman), then teaches that both should be known. The niratman concept has been interpreted to be analogous to anatta doctrine (anatman) of Buddhism. The ontological teachings, however, are different. In the Upanishad, states Thomas Wood, numerous positive and negative descriptions of various states – such as niratman and sarvasyatman (the self of all) – are used in Maitrayaniya Upanishad to explain the nondual concept of the "highest Self". According to Ramatirtha, states Paul Deussen, the niratman state discussion is referring to stopping the recognition of oneself as an individual Self, and reaching the awareness of universal Self or the metaphysical Brahman.

== Reception ==
The Maitri Upanishad is oft cited text in comparative studies of Buddhism and Hinduism, as well as the likely influence of one on the other. Monier-Williams referred to Maitrayaniya Upanishad, among other Vedic literature, in his review of the relationship between Hinduism and Buddhism.

In studies on the earliest discussion of Yoga theory, Maitri Upanishad is among the most referred to.

== See also ==
- Vedas
- Upanishads
- Hinduism
- Buddhism

== Bibliography ==
- Cowell, E. B. (re-issue 1935). (tr.) The Maitri or Maitrāṇīya Upanishad, Calcutta: The Asiatic Society of Bengal
