= Sakayanya =

Fictional character

Sakayanya, also known as Jata Sakayanya, a descendant of Saka, was a ritual authority and contemporary of Sankha in the Kathaka Samhita (xxii.70) also known as Charaka Samhita belonging to Krishna Yajurveda, and which was compiled by Katha, a disciple of Vaisampayana.

Sakayanya was a disciple of Rishi Maitri. And, Shubhra Sharma in his treatise titled - 'Life in the Upanishads' writes that Sakayanya "burns with all the splendor and the grandeur of an incarnation of the Puranic literature, who appears out of the blue and even has the capacity of granting boons". The ideas which Sakayanya expresses were already formed and developed in the earlier Upanishads.

Sakayanya speaks about the 'pure noumenal Self' who arising from the body shines in his own splendour, and of the 'phenomenal Self' called the Bhutatman who is subject to the influence of actions and therefore undergoes transmigration as was taught to him by Rishi Maitri. In the Maitri Upanishad Sakayanya deals with various questions as to form, manifestation, division, existence, and infinity of time. With regard to the question - Whether time is the original cause of everything or not?, he says that Time (Kala), Death (Yama) and Life (Prana) are identical, Time is one of chief manifestation of Brahman, there are two forms of Brahman – 1) Time and 2) Non-time (that existed before the sun came into existence and is indivisible); from the former that is divisible, all creatures are born, and explains that Time ripens and dissolves all beings in the great self, but he who knows into what Time itself dissolved is the knower of the Veda (Maitri or Maitrayani Upanishad VI.14-16).

He even offers Samkhya metaphysics to explain the Yoga processes.

He finally removes the pessimism of Brihadratha Ikshvaku who saw the whole universe decaying around him and who had requested Sakayanya to lift him out of the mire of existence like a frog from a waterless well (Maitri I.7) by teaching him the six-faceted yoga involving pranayama ('breath-control'), pratyahara ('withdrawal of the senses'), dhyana ('meditation'), dharana ('concentration'), tarka ('inquiry') and samadhi ('absorption') which yoga was centuries later systemised by Patanjali.
