= Katha Upanishad =

One of the ancient Sanskrit scriptures of Hinduism

Katha
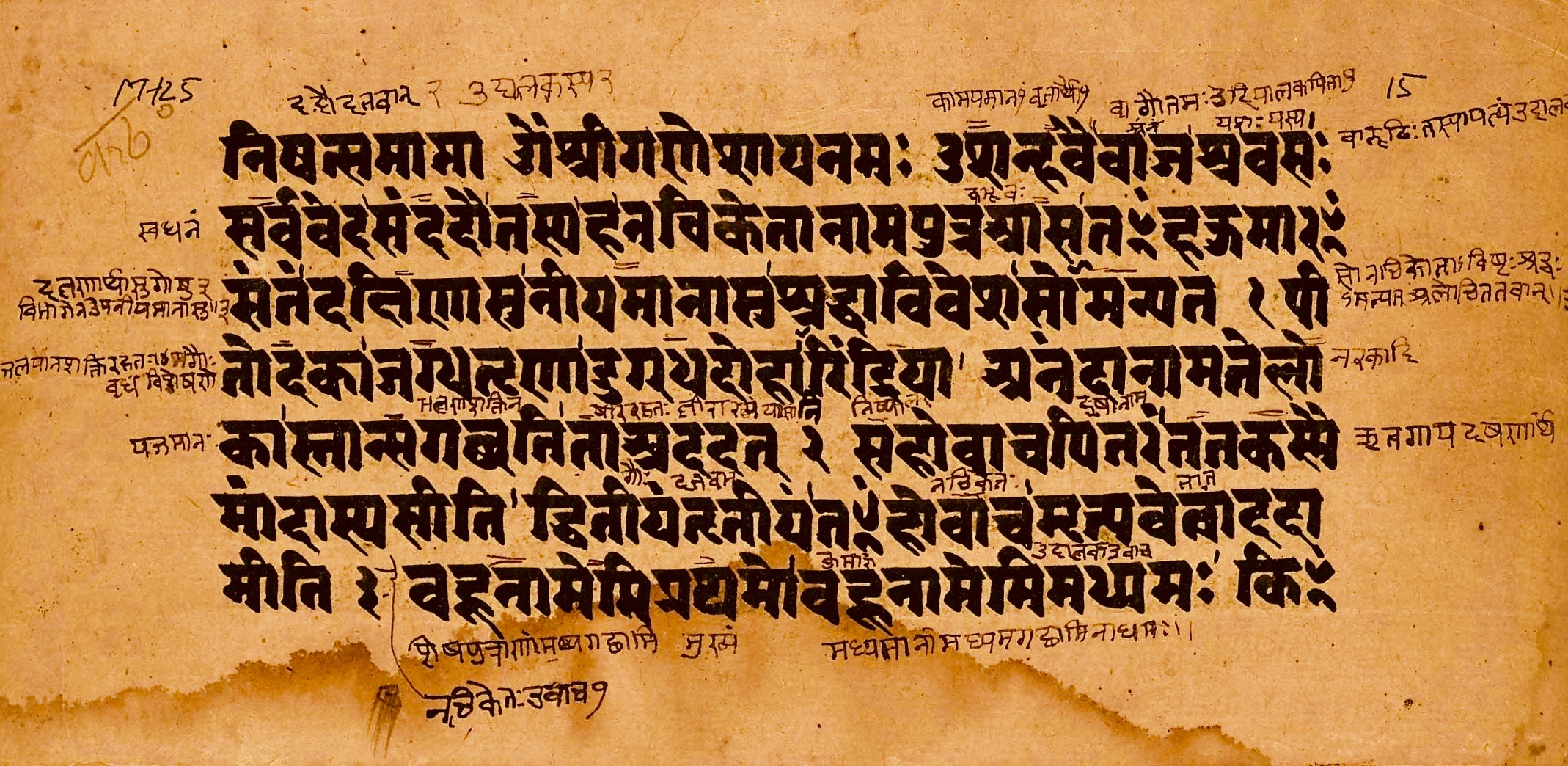
- Katha Upanishad verses 1.1.1 to 1.1.3 of the (Sanskrit, Devanagari script)
- Devanagari: कठ
- IAST: Kaṭha
- Date: 5th to 1st century BCE
- Type: Mukhya Upanishad
- Linked Veda: Krishna Yajurveda
- Commented by: Adi Shankara, Madhvacharya, Rangaramanuja

The Katha Upanishad (Sanskrit: कठोपनिषद्, IAST: Kaṭhopaniṣad), is an ancient Hindu text and one of the mukhya (primary) Upanishads, embedded in the last eight short sections of the Kaṭha school of the Krishna Yajurveda. It is also known as Kāṭhaka Upanishad, and is listed as number 3 in the Muktika canon of 108 Upanishads.

The Katha Upanishad consists of two chapters (Adhyāyas), each divided into three sections (Vallis). The first Adhyaya is considered to be of older origin than the second. The Upanishad has the legendary story of a little boy, Nachiketa – the son of Sage Vajasravasa, who meets Yama (the king of the dead). Their conversation evolves to a discussion of the nature of man, knowledge, Atman (Self) and moksha (liberation).

The chronology of Katha Upanishad is unclear and contested, but it is generally considered to belong to the later Upanishads, dated to the 5th to first centuries BCE.

The Kathaka Upanishad is an important ancient Sanskrit corpus of the Vedanta sub-schools, and an influential Śruti to the diverse schools of Hinduism. It asserts that "Atman (Self) exists", teaches the precept "seek Self-knowledge, which is Highest Bliss", and expounds on this premise like the other primary Upanishads of Hinduism. The detailed teachings of Katha Upanishad have been variously interpreted, as Dvaita (dualistic) and as Advaita (non-dualistic).

It is among the most widely studied Upanishads. Katha Upanishad was translated into Persian in the 17th century, copies of which were then translated into Latin and distributed in Europe. Other philosophers such as Arthur Schopenhauer praised it, Edwin Arnold rendered it in verse as "The Secret of Death", and Ralph Waldo Emerson credited Katha Upanishad for the central story at the end of his essay Immortality, as well as his poem "Brahma".

== Etymology ==
Katha (Sanskrit: कठ) literally means "distress". Katha is also the name of a sage, credited as the founder of a branch of the Krishna Yajurveda, as well as the term for a female pupil or follower of the Katha school of Yajurveda.

Nachiketa, the boy and a central character in the Katha Upanishad, similarly, has a name with closely related words with roots and meanings relevant to the text. Paul Deussen suggests Na kṣiti and Na aksiyete, which are wordplays on Nachiketa and are pronounced similarly; they means "non-decay, or what does not decay", a meaning that is relevant to the second boon in the Nachiketa story. Similarly, Na jiti is another wordplay and means "that which cannot be vanquished", which is contextually relevant to the Nachiketa's third boon. Both Whitney and Deussen independently suggest yet another variation of Nachiketa, with etymological roots that are relevant to the Katha Upanishad: the word Na-ciketa also means "I do not know, or he does not know". Some of these Sanskrit word plays are incorporated within the Upanishad's text.

== Chronology ==
The chronology of the Katha Upanishad is unclear and contested by scholars. All opinions rest on scanty evidence, an analysis of archaism, style and repetitions across texts, driven by assumptions about the likely evolution of ideas, and on presumptions about which philosophy might have influenced which other Indian philosophies.

Richard King and A.L. Basham date the Katha Upanishad's composition roughly to the 5th century BCE, chronologically placing it after the first Buddhist Pali canons. Olivelle assigns the Katha Upanishad together with the Kena, Isha, Svetasvatara, and Mundaka Upanishads, dating it to the first centuries BCE. Paul Deussen also considers Katha Upanishad to be a post-prose, yet earlier stage Upanishad composed about the time Kena and Isha Upanishads were, because of the poetic, mathematical metric structure of its hymns.

Stephen Phillips notes the disagreement between modern scholars. Phillips places the Katha Upanishad chronologically after the Brihadaranyaka, Chandogya, Isha, Taittiriya, Aitareya and Kena, but before the Mundaka, Prasna, Mandukya, Svetasvatara and Maitri Upanishads, as well as before the earliest Buddhist Pali and Jaina canons. (Note: Ranade posits a view similar to Phillips, with slightly different ordering, placing Katha's chronological composition in the fourth group of ancient Upanishads along with Mundaka and Svetasvatara.) M. Winternitz considers the Kathaka Upanishad to be pre-Buddhist, pre-Jaina literature.

== Structure ==
The Katha Upanishad has two chapters (adhyāyas), each with three sections (valli), thus a total of six sections. The first section has 29 verses, the second section 25 verses, and the third section has 17 verses. The second chapter opens with the fourth section of the Katha Upanishad, both the fourth and the fifth section have 15 verses, while the final section has 17 verses.

The first chapter with the first three sections (vallis) is considered older because the third section ends with a structure in Sanskrit that is typically found at the closing of other older Upanishads. Additionally, the central ideas are repeated and expanded upon in the last three sections, which makes up the second chapter. This, however, does not imply a significant gap between the two chapters, both chapters are considered ancient, and from 1st millennium BCE.

The origin of the story of the little boy named Nachiketa, contained in Katha Upanishad is much older. Nachiketa is mentioned in the verses of chapter 3.11 of Taittiriya Brahmana, both as a similar story, and as the name of one of the five fire arrangements for rituals, along with Savitra, Caturhotra, Vaisvasrja and Aruna Agni.

The style and structure suggests that some of the verses in Katha Upanishad, such as 1.1.8, 1.1.16-1.1.18, 1.1.28, among others, are non-philosophical, do not fit with the rest of the text, and are likely later insertion and interpolations.

== Content ==
=== 1st Valli ===
==== The Story of Nachiketa ====
The Upanishad opens with the story of Vajasravasa, also called Aruni Auddalaki Gautama, who gives away all of his worldly possessions. However, his son Nachiketa (Sanskrit: नचिकेत) sees the charitable sacrifice as a farce, because all those worldly things had already been used to exhaustion, and were of no value to the recipients. The cows that were given away, for example, were so old that they had "drunk-their-last-water" (पीतोदकाः), "eaten-their-last-grass" (जग्धतृणाः), "don't give milk" (दुग्धदोहाः) and "who are barren" (निरिन्द्रियाः). Concerned, the son asks his father,

"Dear father, to whom will you give me away?"
He said it a second, and then a third time.
The father, seized by anger, replied: "To Death, I give you away."

— Nachiketa, Katha Upanishad, 1.1.1-1.1.4

Nachiketa does not die, but accepts his father's wish of gifting him to Death by visiting the abode of Yama - the deity of death in the Indian pantheon of deities. Nachiketa arrives, but Yama is not in his abode. Nachiketa as a guest goes hungry for three nights, states verse 9 of the first Valli of the Katha Upanishad. Yama arrives and is apologetic for this dishonor to the guest, so he offers Nachiketa three wishes.

Nachiketa's first wish is that Yama discharges him from the abode of death, back to his family, and that when he returns his father be calm, well-disposed, unresentful and the same as he was before. Yama grants the first wish immediately, states verse 1.1.11 of the Katha Upanishad.

For his second wish, Nachiketa prefaces his request with the statement that heaven is a place where there is no fear, anxiety, old age, hunger, thirst and sorrow. He then asks Yama, in verse 1.1.13 of the Katha Upanishad, to tell him the proper way to perform the fire ritual that enables a human being to attain heaven. Yama responds by detailing the fire ritual, including how the bricks should be arranged, and explaining how the fire represents the building of the world. Nachiketa remembers what Yama tells him, repeats the ritual, a feat that pleases Yama, who declares that this fire ritual will thereafter be called the "Nachiketa fires". Yama adds that along with performing the "three Nachiketa fires", anyone who respects three bonds (with their mother, father and teacher), performs three kinds of karma (rituals, studies and charity), and understands the knowledge therein, will become free of sorrow.

In his third wish, Nachiketa asks Yama, in verse 1.1.20, about the doubt that human beings have concerning "what happens after a person dies? Does he continue to exist in another form? or not?" The remaining verses of the first Valli of the Katha Upanishad express Yama's reluctance to give a straight "yes or no" answer. Yama states that even the gods doubt and are uncertain about that question, and urges Nachiketa to pick another wish. Nachiketa says that if the gods doubt the matter, then Yama, as deity of death, ought to be the only one who knows the answer. Yama offers him all sorts of worldly wealth and pleasures instead, but Nachiketa says that human life is short, asks Yama to keep the worldly wealth and pleasures to himself, declares that material wealth, lust and pleasures are fleeting and vain, and insists on knowing the answer to his question, "what happens after death?"

=== 2nd Valli ===
==== The theory of Good versus Gratifying ====
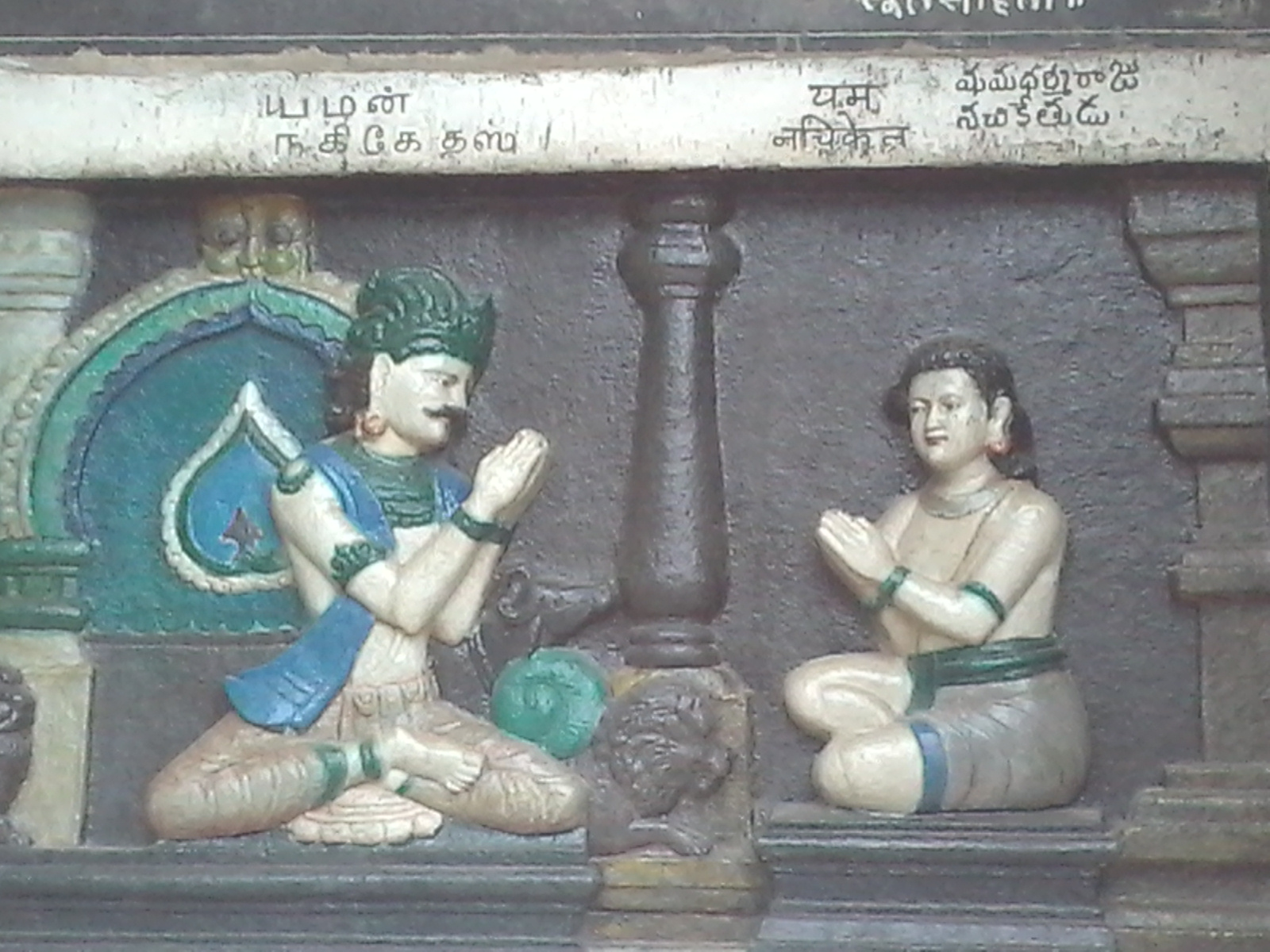
Yama teaches Atma vidya to Nachiketa

Yama begins his teaching by distinguishing between preya (प्रेय, प्रिय, dear, pleasant, gratifying), and shreya (श्रेय, good, beneficial excellence) as translated by Paul Deussen below:

Different is the good and different is the dear,
they both, having different aims, fetter you men;
He, who chooses for himself the good, comes to wellbeing,
he, who chooses the dear, loses the goal.

The good and the dear approach the man,
The wise man, pondering over both, distinguishes them;
The wise one chooses the good over the dear,
The fool, acquisitive and craving, chooses the dear.

— Yama, Katha Upanishad, 1.2.1-1.2.2

The verses 1.2.4 through 1.2.6 of the Katha Upanishad then characterizes knowledge/wisdom as the pursuit of good, and ignorance/delusion as the pursuit of pleasant. The verses 1.2.7 through 1.2.11 of the Katha Upanishad state that knowledge/wisdom and the pursuit of good is difficult but eternal, while ignorance/delusion and the pursuit of the pleasant is easy but transient. Knowledge requires effort, and often not comprehended by man even when he reads it or hears it or by internal argument. The pursuit of knowledge and the good, can be taught, learnt and thus realized, with the mediation of a suitable teacher.

A similar discussion and distinction between the pleasant and the beneficial is found in ancient Greek philosophy, such as in Phaedrus by Plato.

==== Atman, Yoga and the essence of Vedas ====
The Katha Upanishad, in verses 1.2.12, asserts that the Atman – Self – exists, though it is invisible and full of mystery. It also states that it is ancient and recognizable by Yoga (meditation on one's self) as translated by Paul Deussen below. This is one of the earliest mentions of Yoga in ancient Sanskrit literature, in the context of Self-development and meditation.

तं दुर्दर्शं गूढमनुप्रविष्टं
गुहाहितं गह्वरेष्ठं पुराणम् ।
अध्यात्मयोगाधिगमेन देवं
मत्वा धीरो हर्षशोकौ जहाति ॥ १२ ॥

Translation:

He (the Atman), difficult to be seen, full of mystery,
the Ancient, primaeval one, concealed deep in the cavern,
He who, with self-surrender or devotion, comprehends Atman in one's own innermost self as God,
leaves behind (goes beyond) joy and sorrow.
- Katha Upanishad, 1.2.12

In verses 1.2.14 through 1.2.22, the Katha Upanishad asserts that the essence of Vedas is to liberate, look past what has happened and what has not happened, free from the past and the future, refocus one's attention from ignorance to knowledge, leading to the means of a blissful existence beyond joy and sorrow. This is achievable through the realization of Atman-Brahman, asserts Katha Upanishad, and this essence is reminded in the Vedas through the word Om (ॐ, Aum), as stated in verses 1.2.15-1.2.16. That syllable, Aum, is Brahman, means the Highest, and one who knows Aum gets everything he wishes.

Yama is the speaker in the second Valli of the Katha Upanishad. He asserts that man must not fear anyone or anything, not even death, as the true essence of man (Atman) is eternal, beyond birth and death, and identical to Brahman. These passages (as translated by Paul Deussen and Max Muller) have been widely studied, and inspired Emerson among others:

The seer [Atman, Self] is not born, nor does he die;
[H]e does not originate from anybody nor does he become anybody.
Eternal, ancient one, he remains eternal;
he is not killed, even though the body is killed.

— Katha Upanishad, 1.2.18

The Self [Atman], smaller than small, greater than great,
is hidden in the heart of that creature.
A man who is free from desires and free from grief,
sees the majesty of the Self by the grace of the Creator.

— Katha Upanishad, 1.2.20

In final verses of the second Valli, the Katha Upanishad asserts that the knowledge of the Atman cannot be attained through intellectual effort, reason, or scriptural study. Instead, it is revealed by grace (of the Atman) to those whom it selects, but only if they meet certain moral preconditions, as translated by Paul Deussen below:

Not through instruction is the Ātman attained,
not through reason and much scriptural learning;
He will be comprehended by him only whom He selects,
the Ātman reveals his essential nature to him.

— Katha Upanishad, 1.2.23

Similar ideas are repeated in the Mundaka Upanishad in chapter 3.2, another classic ancient scripture of Hinduism.

=== 3rd Valli ===
==== The parable of the Chariot ====
The third Valli of the Katha Upanishad presents the parable of the chariot, to highlight how Atman, body, mind, senses and empirical reality relate to a human being. Paul Deussen's translation of the verses 1.3.3-1.3.4 are as below:

Know that the Ātman is the rider in the chariot,
and the body is the chariot,
Know that the Buddhi (Intelligence) is the charioteer (directing the chariot),
and Manas (mind) is the reins.

The senses are called the horses,
the objects of the senses are their paths (on which the horses drive),
Formed out of the union of the Ātman, the senses and the Manas (mind),
him they call the 'enjoyer'.

— Katha Upanishad, 1.3.3-1.3.4

The Katha Upanishad asserts that one who does not use his powers of reasoning, whose senses are unruly and mind unbridled, his life drifts in chaos and confusion, his existence entangled in samsara. Those who use their intelligence, have their senses calm, pure and under control, they live a life of bliss and liberation, which is the highest place of Vishnu. Whitney clarifies that "Vishnu" appears in Vedas as a form of Sun, and "Vishnu's highest place" is a Vedic phrase that means "zenith". Madhvacharya, the Dvaita Vedanta scholar interprets this term differently, and bases his theistic interpretation of Katha Upanishad by stating that the term refers to the deity Vishnu.

This metaphorical parable of chariot is found in multiple ancient Indian texts, and is called the Ratha Kalpana. A similar simile is found in ancient Greek literature, such as the Parmenides, Xenophon's prologue of Prodikos, and in the Platonic dialogue Phaedrus.

==== The nature of Atman, the need for Ethics and the hierarchy of Reality ====
The Katha Upanishad, in verses 1.3.10 through 1.3.12 presents a hierarchy of Reality from the perspective of a human being. It asserts that Artha (objects, means of life) are above Indriya (senses), that Manas (mind) is above Artha in this hierarchy, and above Manas is Buddhi (intellect, his ability to discern). Above Buddhi is Atman (his Self, great Self). The Katha Upanishad states that beyond Atman is the Avyaktam (unmanifested Reality), and the Purusha (the highest being) is beyond the Avyaktam. Beyond the Purusha, there is nothing, as it represents the ultimate goal and the highest path. At the basic level of life, the interaction occurs between Artha and Indriya (sensory organs); while at the highest level, man becomes aware of and holistically realizes the entire hierarchy. The Purasa is hidden in all beings as Atman, asserts the Katha Upanishad; it does not show itself, but its awareness is felt by seers with agrya sukshma (subtle, more self-evident conscious, keen thinkers).

In verse 1.3.13, the Katha Upanishad states that Prajna (conscious man) should heed to the ethical precept of self-examination and self-restraint, restraining his speech and mind by the application of his Buddhi (power to reason). Man should, asserts Katha Upanishad, holistically unify his tempered senses and mind with his intellect, all these with his Atman (Self), and unify his "great Self" with the Self of the rest, the tranquility of oneness with the Avyaktam. Through this process the Purasa (the highest being) is isolated from them all and the goal is attained. In verse 1.3.15, the Katha Upanishad states that which is soundless, touchless, formless, tasteless, scentless, without beginning, without end, imperishable, beyond the great, blissful, and when one reveres that, he is liberated. Such realization is not easy according to the Katha Upanishad.

उत्तिष्ठत जाग्रत
प्राप्य वरान्निबोधत ।
क्षुरस्य धारा निशिता दुरत्यया
दुर्गं पथस्तत्कवयो वदन्ति ॥ १४ ॥

Translation:

Rise, awake!
Having obtained these boons, understand them!
The sharp edge of a razor is difficult to pass over;
Thus the wise say the path (to Self) is hard.
- Katha Upanishad, 1.3.14

Paul Deussen states that verses 1.3.10 to 1.3.13 of the Katha Upanishad is one of the earliest mentions of the elements of Yoga theory, and the recommendation of Yoga as a path to the highest goal of man, that is a life of spiritual freedom and liberation. This theory is significantly expanded upon in the second chapter of the Katha Upanishad, particularly in the sixth Valli.

=== 4th Valli ===
==== The theory of Atman, Oneness and Plurality ====
The fourth Valli starts by asserting that inner knowledge is that of unity, eternal calmness and spiritual oneness, while the external knowledge is that of plurality, perishable "running around" and sensory objects. The Katha Upanishad in the fifteen verses of the fourth Valli, as well as those of the fifth Valli, explains what is Atman, how it can be known, the nature of Atman, and why it ought to be known. For definition, it deploys an epistemic combination of "positive assertions" as well as "exposition by elimination", the latter repeated with below verse translated by W.D.Whitney,

किमत्र परिशिष्यते । एतद्वै तत् ॥ ४ ॥

What is left here? This verily is that [Atman].

— Katha Upanishad, 2.4.3

Atman, asserts the Katha Upanishad, is the subject of inner-knowledge, the bearer of spiritual reality, that which is all-pervading, inside every being, which unifies all human beings as well as all creatures, the concealed, eternal, immortal, and pure bliss. It exists and is active when man is in awake-state; it exists and is active when man is in dream-state. The empirical reality is the "honey" for the Atman, with the honey metaphor repeating "fruit of numerous karma flowers in the valley of life" doctrine found in other Upanishads, such as in the second chapter of Brihadaranyaka Upanishad. To know Atman, look inward and introspect; to know objects, look outward and examine, states the Katha Upanishad. Everything that changes is not Atman, that which was, is, will be and never changes is Atman. Just like a baby is concealed inside a mother's womb when conceived, Atman is concealed inside every creature, states verse 2.4.8 of the Katha Upanishad.

Purusa lives in the heart of the Self (body) as the lord of the past, the lord of the present, and the lord of the future. The Self is eternal, never born and never dies, and is part of that which existed before the universe was formed from "brooding heat". The sun rests in it, the gods rest in it, and all nature rests in it; it is everywhere and it is in everything. To understand the eternal nature of one's Self is to feel calmness, inner peace, patience and freedom regardless of the circumstances one is in, the affections or threats one faces, praises or insults one is subjected to. Anyone who runs after sensory-impressions, gets lost among them just like water flows randomly after rainfall on mountains, state verses 2.4.14 and 2.4.15 of the Katha Upanishad; and those who know their Self and act according to its Dharma remain pure, just as pure water remains pure when poured into pure water.

There is no plurality or separateness between the essence (Atman) of I and that of others, or between the essence of nature and that of the spirit, asserts the Katha Upanishad in verses 2.4.10 and 2.4.11. The Self-driven individual ignores the superficial individuality of others, and accepts their essential identity. Paul Deussen suggests that verses 2.4.6 and 2.4.7 posit a nondualistic (Advaita) position, where both Purusha and Prakrti are only Atman. This position contrasts with one of the fundamental premises of the dualistic schools of Hinduism. Shankara agrees with this interpretation. Ramanuja does not and offers a theistic dualism based interpretation instead.

=== 5th Valli ===
==== Life is highest joy, and what happens after death ====
The fifth Valli of the Katha Upanishad is an eschatological treatise. It begins by stating that human body is like a Pura (Sanskrit: पुर, town, city) with eleven gates that connect it to the universe. The Katha Upanishad asserts that an individual who understands and reveres this town of eternal, non-changing spirit, is never crooked-minded and is always free. The Self dwells in swan, in the atmosphere, in man, in wide spaces (Varasad), in eternal law, and everywhere in the universe. It is born of water, it is born of kine, it is born of Ṛta (right, truth, ethics, morals, eternal law), and it is born of stone (mountains) as the great Ṛta, as it ought to be. This Self is worshipped by all the gods. Body dies, but the Self doesn't.

In verses 2.5.6 and 2.5.7, the Katha Upanishad discusses what happens to the Self after death, stating a variant of the premise of Karma theory that underlies major Indian religions,

योनिमन्ये प्रपद्यन्ते शरीरत्वाय देहिनः ।
स्थाणुमन्येऽनुसंयन्ति यथाकर्म यथाश्रुतम् ॥ ७ ॥

Some of these souls enter into the mother's womb, embodying into corporeality [body],
Others assemble into plants [what is Sthānu (immovable things)],
each according to his work [karma], each according to his knowledge [ shrutam (श्रुतम्, learning)].

— Katha Upanishad, 2.5.7

The Atman (Self) is always awake and active, while one is asleep, shaping one's dreams. It is one with Brahman. It is everywhere, within and without, and is immortal. This universal oneness theme is explained by the Katha Upanishad by three similes, which Paul Deussen describes as excellent. Just like one light exists and penetrates the cosmic space, enveloping and clinging to everything and every form individually, the "one inner Self" of beings exists and dwells in all beings, clings to every form and remains still without, states the Katha Upanishad. Just like one air exists and penetrates the world, enveloping and clinging to everything and every being individually, the "one inner Self" of beings exists and dwells in all beings, clings to every form and remains still without. Just like the Sun exists and its nature is not contaminated by the impurities seen by the eyes, the "one inner Self" of beings exists and its nature is pure, never contaminated by the sorrows and blemishes of the external world. Parts of the ideas in these first two similes of the Katha Upanishad have far more ancient origins, and found for example in Book 6, Chapter 47 of the Rig veda.

That individual is perennially happy, asserts the Katha Upanishad, who realizes that the Atman is within him, that he himself is the Master, that the inner Self of all beings and his own Self are "one form manifold", and that there is none other. Life is spirit, full of joy. Meaning is Atman, full of perennial peace. "Truly, this is that", once deeply felt and understood by man, is an inexpressible and highest joy. The one who realizes this shines, and his splendour illuminates everything with and by (Anu); the whole world shines through such unleashed joy, and manifested splendour.

=== 6th Valli ===
==== The theory of Yoga ====
The sixth Valli continues the discussion of Karma and rebirth theory, sections of which Max Muller states is possibly interpolated and inserted in a later period. The first five verses of the last section of the Upanishad assert that those who do not know or do not understand Atman return to the world of creation, and those who do are free and liberated. Some unaware of Brahman's essence are naturally inclined to fear God and its manifestation such as nature (fire, lightning, sun), state the verses 2.6.2 and 2.6.3 of the Katha Upanishad. Those who are aware of Brahman's essence, are awakened to the knowledge, fear no one and nothing, and become immortal as Brahman.

The Katha Upanishad, in verses 2.6.6 through 2.6.13 recommends a path to this knowledge, and calls it Yoga as translated below by Paul Duessen.

यदा पञ्चावतिष्ठन्ते ज्ञानानि मनसा सह ।
बुद्धिश्च न विचेष्टते तामाहुः परमां गतिम् ॥ १० ॥
तां योगमिति मन्यन्ते स्थिरामिन्द्रियधारणाम् ।
अप्रमत्तस्तदा भवति योगो हि प्रभवाप्ययौ ॥ ११ ॥

Translation:

Only when Manas [mind] with the five senses has attained the still state,
and when Buddhi (intellegence) does not waver,
that they call the highest goal (to be reached).

That is what one calls Yoga,
the firm hold over the senses [pratyahara concerns the stillness of the senses, and dharana concerns the concentration of the mind]
During this (practice), one is not, however, sluggish
Yoga is creation and dissolution.

- Katha Upanishad, 2.6.10-11

==== Realize you are perfect now and here ====
The Katha Upanishad concludes its philosophical presentation in verses 14-15 of the sixth Valli. The state of perfection, according to the last section of the Upanishad, explains Paul Deussen, consists "not in the attainment of a future or yonder world, but it is already just now and here for one who is Self-realized, who knows his Self as Brahman [Cosmic Self]". This teaching is also presented in the other ancient scriptures of Hinduism, such as Brihadaranyaka Upanishad's Chapter 4.4.6.7.

The verse 15 of the sixth Valli declares that the Upanishad concludes its teaching therein. Yet, the Valli contains three additional verses in modern era manuscripts. Scholars suggest that these remaining verses 2.6.16 – 2.6.18 are possibly modern additions as appendix and have been interpolated. This is due to the declaration of Upanishad's end in verse 15, and the additional three verses that are structured in prose-like manner, rather than the poetic, metric-perfection that the Katha Upanishad is largely written in.

== Reception ==
Charles Johnston has described the Katha Upanishad as one of the highest spiritual texts, with layers of metaphors embedded therein. To Johnston, the three nights and three boons in the first Valli of the Katha Upanishad, for example, are among the text's many layers, with the three connoting the past, the present and the future.

The Irish poet, William Butler Yeats dedicated several essays and sonnets to themes in the Katha Upanishad and related ancient Upanishads of India. George William Russell similarly esteemed the Katha and other Upanishads. The American poet, Ralph Waldo Emerson held the Katha Upanishad in high regard, and wrote several poems and essays paralleling the themes found in it.

The various themes contained in the Katha Upanishad have been the subject of many scholarly works. For example, Elizabeth Schiltz has compared "the parable of the chariot" in the Katha Upanishad with the Platonic dialogue "Phaedrus", noting that the "remarkable similarities give rise to a great many tantalizing historical and literary questions", and adding that, "each provides an image of the self as the chariot, they each offer a complex moral psychology, and point toward an effective justification of the best life". Radhakrishnan notes that the Katha Upanishad's discussion of "good versus pleasant" is evidence of the ethical theories and philosophical longings of ancient Indians by the 1st millennium BCE, much like those in Greek city states in Europe.

=== In popular culture ===
A verse in the Upanishad inspired the title and the epigraph of W. Somerset Maugham's 1944 novel The Razor's Edge, later adapted, twice, into films of the same title (see articles on 1946 and 1984 films). The epigraph reads, "The sharp edge of a razor is difficult to pass over; thus the wise say the path to Salvation is hard", which is taken from a verse in the Katha-Upanishad – 1.3.14. Maugham had visited India in 1938 and met Ramana Maharishi at his ashram in Tamil Nadu.

Filmmaker Ashish Avikunthak made a film based on this Upanishad called "Katho Upanishad" which was first shown as a video installation at Gallery Chatterjee & Lal in Mumbai in 2012.

== See also ==
- Chariot Allegory

== Sources ==
- Olivelle, Patrick (1996), The Early Upanishads: Annotated Text & Translation, Oxford University Press, ISBN 978-0195124354
