= Nachiketa =

Character in Hindu literature

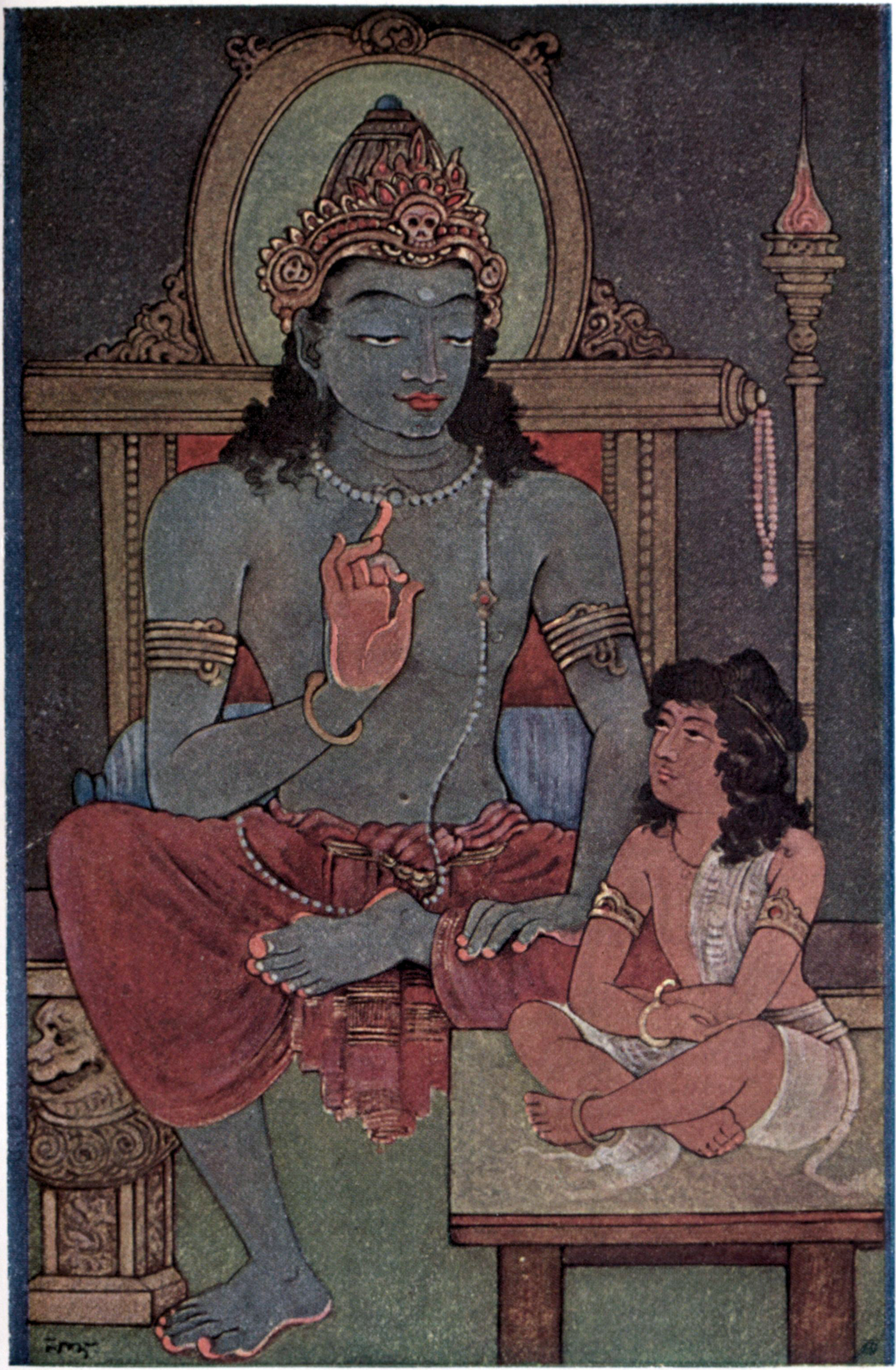
- Yama and Nachiketa, 20th century painting
- Texts: Upanishads

Genealogy
- Parents: Vājashravas or Uddālaki (father)

Nachiketas (Sanskrit: नचिकेतस्, romanized: Naciketas), also rendered Nachiketā and Nachiketan, is a character in Hindu literature. He is the son of the sage Vājashravas, or Uddalaki, in some traditions. He is the child protagonist of an ancient Indian dialogical narrative about the nature of the atman (soul).

His allegorical story is told in the Katha Upanishad, though the name has several earlier references. He was taught self-knowledge, knowledge about the atman (soul), and the Brahman (Ultimate Reality), by Yama, the god of death. Nachiketa is noted for his rejection of material desires, which are ephemeral, and for his single-minded pursuit of the path of self-realisation moksha.

== Literature ==
=== Rigveda ===
The Rigveda 10.135 talks of Yama and a child, who may be a reference to Nachiketas.

=== Taittiriya Brahmana ===
Nachiketas is also mentioned in the Taittiriya Brahmana, 3.1.8.

=== Mahabharata ===
In the Mahabharata, the name appears as one of the sages present in the Sabha (royal assembly) of King Yudhishthira (Sabha Parva, Section IV,) and also in the Anusasana Parva (106).

=== Katha Upanishad ===
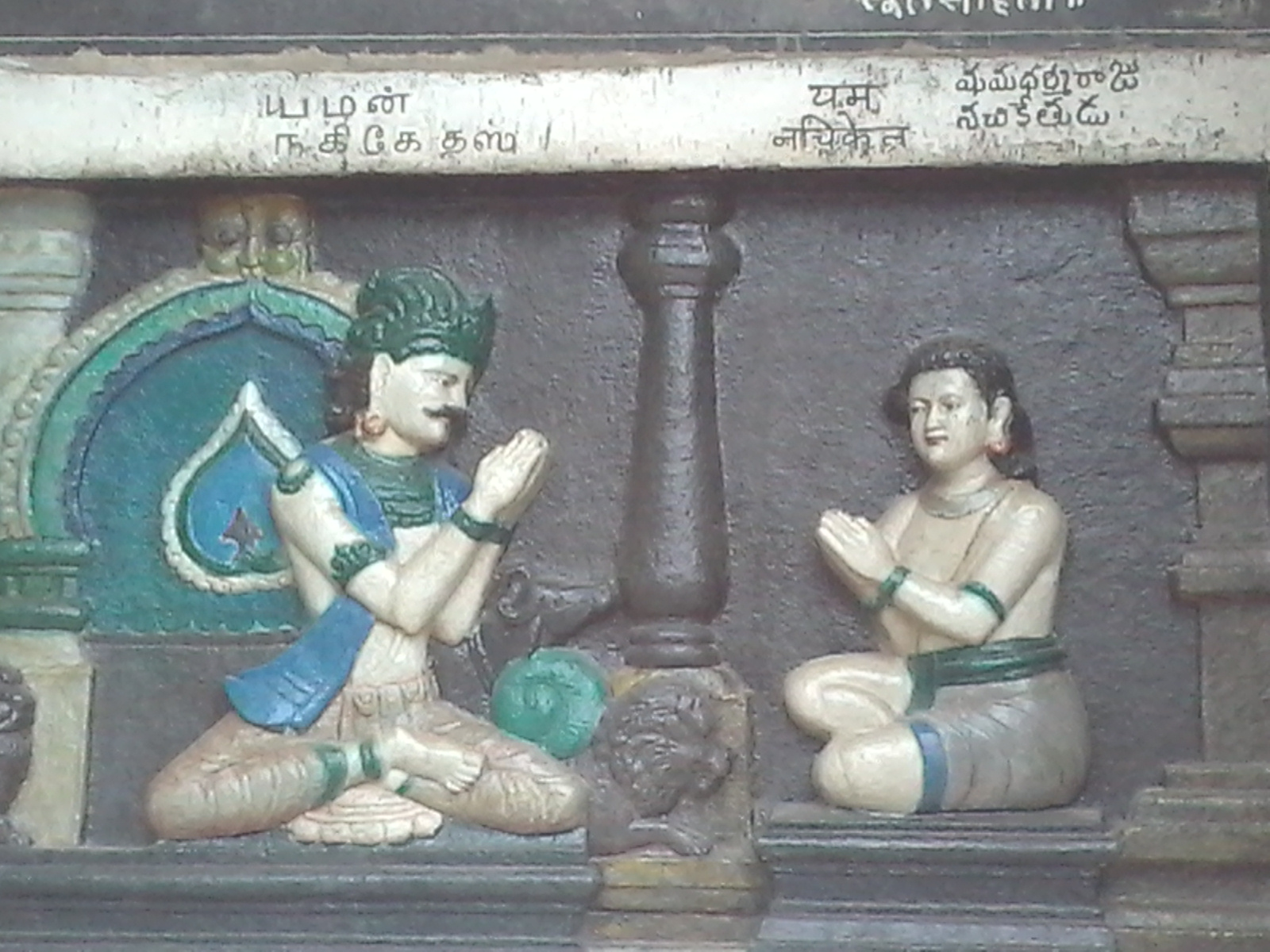
Yama teaches Atma vidya to Nachiketa, at Rameshwaram temple.

Vājashravas, desiring a gift from the gods, started an offering to donate all his possession. But Nachiketa, his son, noticed that Vājashravas was donating only the cows that were old, barren, blind, or lame; not such as might buy the worshipper a place in heaven. Nachiketas, wanting the best for his father's rite, asked: "I too am yours, to which God will you offer me?" After being pestered thus, Vājashravas answered in a fit of anger, "I give you unto Yamaraja (god of death) Himself!"

Despite his father's repentance for his outburst, Nachiketas regarded his father's words as having a divine meaning, and, consoling him, went to Yamaraja's home. Yama was out, and so he waited for three days without any food or water. When Yama returned, he was sorry to see that a Brahmin guest had been waiting so long without food and water. To compensate for his mistake, Yama told Nachiketas, "You have waited in my house for three days without hospitality, therefore ask three boons from me". Nachiketa first asked for peace for his father and himself, when he returned to his father. Yama agreed. Next, Nachiketas wished to learn the sacred fire sacrifice, which Yama elaborated. For his third boon, Nachiketas wanted to learn the mystery of what comes after the death of the body.

Yama was reluctant on this question. He said that this had been a mystery even to the gods. He urged Nachiketas to ask for some other boon, and offered him longevity, progeny, wealth, rulership of a planet of his choice, and all the apsaras of his choice instead. But Nachiketas replied that material things are ephemeral, and would not confer immortality. So, no other boon would do. Yama was secretly pleased with this disciple, and elaborated on the nature of the true Self, which persists beyond the death of the body. He revealed the knowledge that one's Self is inseparable from Brahman, the supreme spirit, the vital force in the universe. Yama's explanation is a succinct explication of Hindu metaphysics, and focuses on the following points:

- The sound Om is the syllable of the supreme Brahman
- The Atman, is the same as the omnipresent Brahman. Smaller than the smallest and larger than the largest, the Soul is formless and all-pervading
- The goal of the wise is to know this Atman
- The Atman is like a rider; the horses are the senses, which he guides through the maze of desires
- After death, it is the Atman that remains; the Atman is immortal
- Mere reading of the scriptures or intellectual learning cannot realise Atman
- One must discriminate the Atman from the body, which is the seat of desire
- The inability to realise Brahman results in one being enmeshed in the cycle of rebirths; Understanding the Self leads to moksha

Thus having learned the wisdom of the Brahman from Yama, Nachiketas returned to his father as a jivanmukta, an individual who has achieved spiritual liberation while being alive.

== In popular culture ==
The story of Nachiketas and his conversation with the god Yama has been the topic of many retellings and adaptations in India.

=== Graphic Novel ===
- Amar Chitra Katha new series number 702 titled Nachiketas, published in 1979, tells the story of Nachiketas in the form of a graphic novel.

== See also ==
- Vasishtha
- Trikaranasuddhi
