= Kshurika Upanishad =

Kshurika
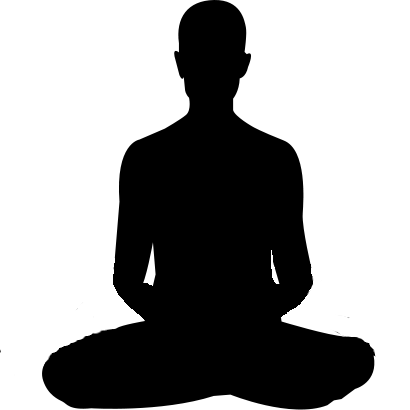
- Cut away the outer world in meditation, states the text
- Devanagari: क्षुरिका
- IAST: Kṣurikā
- Title means: Mind as a Razor
- Type: Yoga
- Linked Veda: Krishna Yajurveda or Atharvaveda
- Chapters: 1
- Verses: 25

The Kshurika Upanishad (Sanskrit: क्षुरिका उपनिषत्, IAST: Kṣurikā Upaniṣad) is an ancient Sanskrit text and one of the minor Upanishads of Hinduism. It is one of twenty Yoga Upanishads in the four Vedas.

Its manuscripts are either attached to the Atharvaveda, or to the Krishna Yajurveda.

The text includes sections on Yoga postures, breath exercises and withdrawal of senses from outside to inside as a means to cleanse the body and mind. The aim of Yoga, states the Upanishad, is to know and liberate one's soul. The text is also called Kṣurikopanishad.

== Etymology ==
The Sanskrit word Kshurika means "razor", and in this Upanishad, it metaphorically signifies yoga being a tool to cut oneself away from Maya (illusion) and errors. A similar meaning to Kshurika is attributed in the Mundaka Upanishad.

== Chronology ==
The text is ancient, states Mircea Eliade, who places its relative chronology to the same period when the following Hindu texts were composed - Maitri Upanishad, the didactic parts of the Mahabharata, the chief Sannyasa Upanishads and along with other early Yoga Upanishads such as Brahmabindu, Brahmavidya, Tejobindu, Yogatattva, Nadabindu, Yogashikha, Dhyanabindu and Amritabindu. These and the Kshurika text, adds Eliade, were composed earlier than the ten or eleven later yogic Upanishads such as the Yoga-kundali, Varaha and Pashupatabrahma Upanishads.

Gavin Flood dates this text, along with other Yoga Upanishads, to be probably from the 100 BCE to 300 CE period.

== Anthology ==
Kshurika Upanishadis listed at number 31 in the serial order of the Muktika enumerated by Rama to Hanuman in the modern era anthology of 108 Upanishads. Colebrooke's version of 52 Upanishads, popular in north India, lists this Upanishad's text at number 4 The Narayana anthology also includes this Upanishad at number 4 in Bibliothica Indica. In the collection of Upanishads under the title "Oupanekhat", put together by Sultan Mohammed Dara Shikhoh in 1656, consisting of a Persian translation of 50 Upanishads and who prefaced it as the best book on religion, the Kshurika is listed at number 33 and is named Tschchourka According to Alain Daniélou, this Upanishad is one of the 10 Raja Yoga Upanishads, seven of which are under the Krishna Yajurveda and the balance 3 under the Shukla Yajurveda.

== Contents ==
The text is composed in poetic prose style. It is notable for its discussion of concentration of mind during meditation, stating that mind is the Kshurika (razor) that can cut away worldly distractions and external sense objects during Dharana step of Yoga. It calls it the Dhyana-yoga. The Upanishad also includes sections on Asana (posture), Pranayama (breath exercises) and Pratyahara (withdrawal of senses from outside to inside) as a means to cleanse the body and mind. The aim of Yoga, describes the Upanishad, is to know and liberate one's soul.

Then, well conscious in the mind,
He chooses a quiet place,
Freed from worldly inclination and expectation,
A real knower of Yoga, by and by.

Just as a bird, cutting the cord,
Soars fearless into the sky,
So the soul (Atman), cutting the cord,
Rises above the Samsara.

—Kshurika Upanishad 21-22

Yogic meditation, states the Kshurika Upanishad, is the razor that helps severe the mind from the changing reality and worldly cravings, achieve self-knowledge and liberation from Samsara (rebirth).

When the knife of the fixed mind whetted by breath control,
sharpened on the stone of renunication has cut through the weave of life,
adept is forever released from his bonds.
Freed from all desire, he becomes immortal;
delivered from temptations, having cut through the toil of existence,
he is no longer in samsara.

— Kshurika Upanishad, 1.24

== See also ==
- Hatha yoga
- Yoga (philosophy)
- Yogatattva Upanishad
- Yoga Vasistha
