= Nadabindu Upanishad =

Sanskrit text, Yoga Upanishad

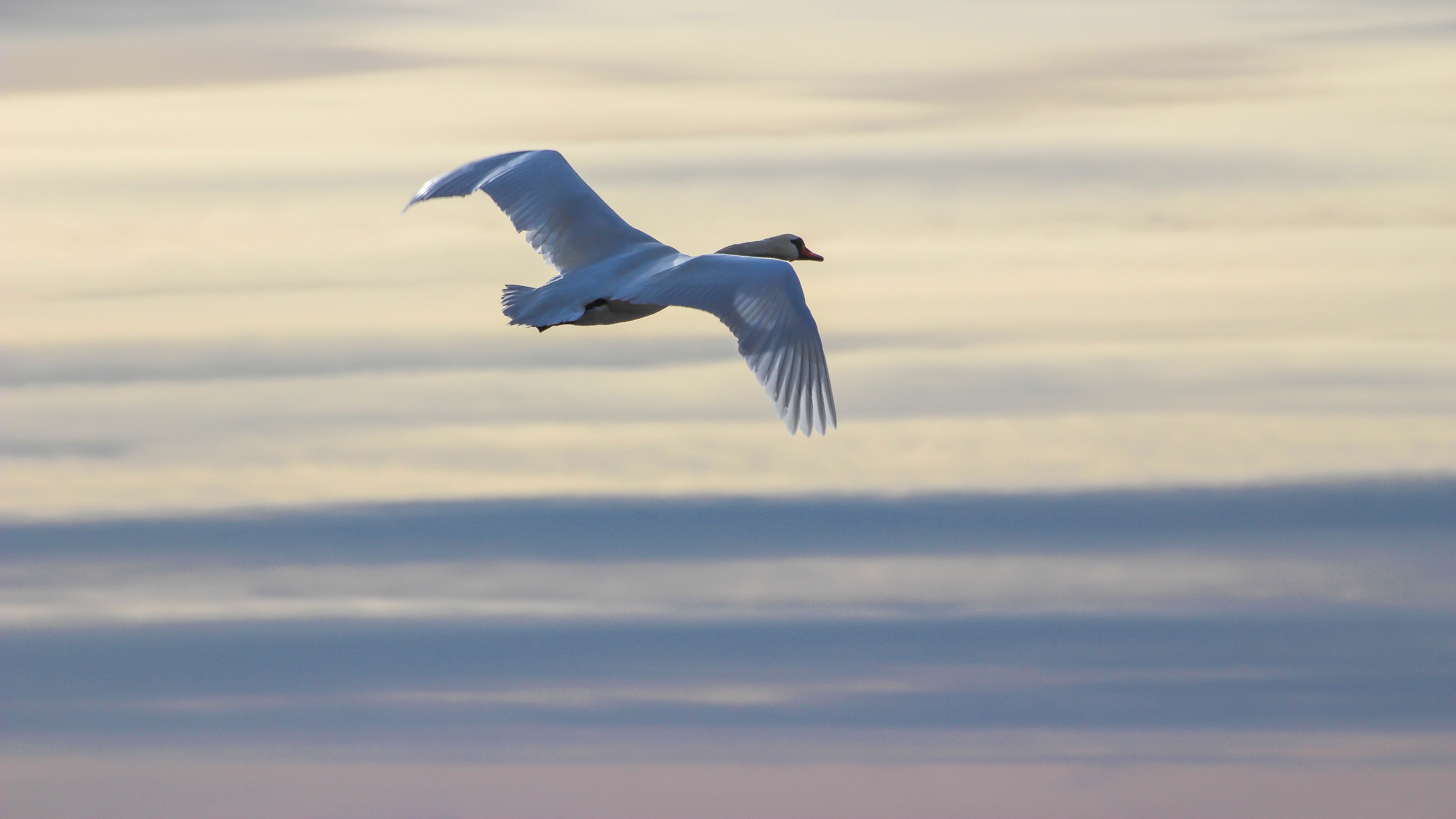
- Opening verses of the Upanishad metaphorically describe soul as a migrant bird
- Devanagari: नादबिन्दू
- IAST: Nādabindu
- Title means: Pinpoint Concentration due to nada.
- Date: ~100 BCE to 300 CE
- Type: Yoga
- Linked Veda: Atharvaveda
- Chapters: 1
- Verses: 20, 56
- Philosophy: Yoga, Vedanta

The Nadabindu Upanishad (Sanskrit: नादबिन्दु उपनिषद् , IAST: Nādabindu Upaniṣad) is an ancient Sanskrit text and one of the minor Upanishads of Hinduism. It is one of twenty Yoga Upanishads in the four Vedas. It also known as Amrita Nada Bindu Upanishad.(Sanskrit: अमृतनादबिन्दु उपनिषद)

The text exists in two significantly different versions, the North Indian and the South Indian. These manuscripts are respectively attached to the Atharvaveda, or to the Rigveda.

== Etymology ==
The word Nada, being a Vedic terminology refers to as the unstruck sound or "Anahata Nada" which is reported as a thin buzzing sound being heard in right ear, and upon whom meditating, a person attains the "turya" of meditation easily. It is said that this sound has its source in the Anahata Chakra (the fourth Chakra in Vedic terminology). Other religions also have same terms for it like "shabda," "Logos," etc. This scripture tells how to listen to that sound so that to attain a deep state of meditation.

== History ==
The relative chronology of the text is placed by Mircea Eliade with the ancient Yoga Upanishads. He suggests that it was composed in the same period when the following texts were composed – Maitri Upanishad, the didactic parts of the Mahabharata, the chief Sannyasa Upanishads and along with other early Yoga Upanishads such as Brahmabindu, Brahmavidya, Tejobindu, Yogatattva, Kshurika, Yogashikha, Dhyanabindu and Amritabindu. These and the Nadabindu text, adds Eliade, were composed earlier than the ten or eleven later yogic Upanishads such as the Yoga-kundali, Varaha and Pashupatabrahma Upanishads.

Gavin Flood dates this text, along with other Yoga Upanishads, to be probably from the 100 BCE to 300 CE period. Guy Beck dates it to be probably from the pre-Christian era and the earliest document on the Yoga of sacred sound, while Georg Feuerstein suggests that the text is likely from a period in early 1st millennium CE. Mikel Burley states that this text does not provide techniques of Hatha Yoga, but probably influenced the later Hatha yoga texts.

The Upanishad is also referred to as Nadabindu Upanishad or Nadabindupanisad (नादबिन्दूपनिषत). It is listed at number 38 in the serial order of the Muktika enumerated by Rama to Hanuman in the modern era anthology of 108 Upanishads. In the Colebrooke's version of 52 Upanishads, popular in north India, it is listed at number 17 The Narayana anthology also includes this Upanishad at number 17 in Bibliothica Indica. In the collection of Upanishads under the title "Oupanekhat", put together by Sultan Mohammed Dara Shikhoh in 1656, consisting of a Persian translation of 50 Upanishads and who prefaced it as the best book on religion, the Amratanada is listed at number 43 and is named anbratnad.

== Contents ==
Know the Atman as one,
Then, waking, dream and deep sleep,
Throwing off these three states,
You will never be born again.

A single being-self there is,
It dwells in each and every being,
Uniform and yet multiform,
It appears like the moon in pond.

— Brahmabindu Upanishad 11–12

The text is composed in poetic verse style. The text, in both versions of the manuscripts, opens with a metaphorical comparison of Atman (Soul, Self) as a Hamsa bird (swan, goose), comparing both to the Om symbol and the Samkhya theory of three Gunas. It asserts that true Yoga involves meditation and renunciation from all attachments to worldly cravings.

Dharma (ethics), states the text, is a requirement for a Yogi life, and is notable for describing the Om symbol with twelve moras instead of three and a half moras commonly found in ancient Indian literature.

The yogin contemplates Omkara, asserts the text, as Hamsa, in twelve Kalas or variations of the four matras (intonations). The variation is produced by the three svara (note on the musical scale), namely Udatta, Anudatta and Svarita. The twelve Kalas, according to Nadabindu text, are Ghosini, Vidyunmali, Patangini, Vayuvegini, Namadheya, Aindri, Vaishnavi, Sankari, Mahati, Dhriti, Nari and Brahmi. The manuscripts of Nadabindu discovered in different parts of India, partially vary in this list. For example, the Calcutta version differs from Poona edition by replacing Dhriti with Dhruva, and Mauni for Nari. The text suggests that a yogin should contemplate and be absorbed in the Om with these Kalas, as it leads one to knowledge of Atman or Self, helping him overcome three types of Karma. The text refers to the Vedanta theory of Ajnana (ignorance) as the cause of bondage, suggesting that a yogin should listen to his inner voice in Siddhasana.

A yogin, at the start of practice, concentrates inwardly hearing one constant or many sounds emanating, like those of an ocean and/or thunder (It is said that initial awareness commences with high pitched buzzing, and others familiar such as crickets and at deeper levels sounds of flute, cymbals, thunder and orchestra). These filter out, and over time, more subtle sounds such as a single musical note may be sensed at will, . This focus on inner sound helps the yogi moderate distractions from other senses and fluctuations of the mind, just as a bee focussed on pollen collection moderates its awareness of odours peripheral to the pollen. . Such a yogi moderates worldly concern about fame, disgrace, heat, cold, joy or sorrow, and is found within, in the Self, in Brahman-Pranava (Om).

The goal of Yoga, asserts the text, is to realize the transcendent Atman, its existence in everyone, and its oneness with Brahman through meditation and absorption into Nada (sound Om).

== See also ==
- Amritabindu Upanishad
- Dhyanabindu Upanishad
- Tejobindu Upanishad
- Hatha yoga
- Yoga (philosophy)
- Yogatattva Upanishad
- Yoga Vasistha
- Tinnitus
