= Yoga Upanishads =

Group of 20 Hindu texts

Yoga Upanishads are a group of Upanishads of Hinduism related to Yoga. There are twenty Yoga Upanishads in the anthology of 108 Upanishads listed in the Muktika anthology. The Yoga Upanishads, along with other minor Upanishads, are generally classified separate from the major Principal Upanishads considered to be more ancient and from the Vedic tradition.

The Yoga Upanishads deal with the theory and practice of Yogic techniques, with varied emphasis on methodology and meditation, but with some shared ideas. They contrast from other groups of minor Upanishads, such as the Samanya Upanishads which are of a generic nature, the Sannyasa Upanishads which focus on the Hindu renunciation and monastic practice, the Shaiva Upanishads which highlight aspects of Shaivism, the Vaishnava Upanishads which highlight Vaishnavism, and the Shakta Upanishads which highlight Shaktism.

== Date ==
The composition date of each Yoga Upanishad is unclear, and estimates on when they were composed vary among scholars. According to Mahony, they likely are dated between 100 BC and 1100 AD. However, Gavin Flood dates the Yoga Upanishads to the 100 BCE to 300 CE period. (Note: Shearer mentions a dating between 100 BCE-400 BCE, referring to ...) According to James Mallinson, some Yoga Upanishads were revised in the eighteenth century to incorporate the Hatha Yoga ideas of the Hindu Natha sub-tradition.

Mircea Eliade states that textual style, archaic language and the mention of some Yoga Upanishads in other Indian texts suggest the following Yoga Upanishads were likely composed in the same period as the didactic parts of the Mahabharata and the chief Sannyasa Upanishads: Brahmabindu (probably composed about the same time as Maitri Upanishad), Ksurika, Amritabindu, Brahmavidya, Tejobindu Upanishad, Nadabindu, Yogashikha, Dhyanabindu and Yogatattva. Eliade's suggestion places these in the final BCE centuries or early CE centuries. All these, adds Eliade, likely were composed earlier than the ten or eleven later Yoga Upanishads such as the Yoga-kundalini, Varaha and Pashupatabrahma Upanishads.

== Scope ==
Yoga Upanishads discuss different aspects and kinds of Yoga, ranging from postures, breath exercises, meditation (dhyana), sound (nada), tantra (kundalini anatomy) and others. Some of these topics are not covered in the Bhagavad Gita or Patanjali's Yoga Sutras.

Many texts describe Yoga as consisting of steps or members (angas) and according to Paul Deussen, the important Yoga Upanishads which deal with these are the Brahmavidya, Kshurika, Culika (listed under the Samanya Upanishads), Nadabindu, Brahmabindu, Amritabindu, Dhyanabindu, Tejobindu, Yogashika, Yogatattva, and Hamsa. These 11 Yoga Upanishads belong to the Vedic shakha (school) from the Vedantic point of view. They include discussion of ethics [ yama, (self restraints such as non-violence) and niyama, (self effort such as study) ], asana (physical exercises and body posture), pranayama (breath exercises), pratyahara (withdrawal of the senses), dharana (concentration of the mind), dhyana (contemplation and meditation) and samadhi (a state of meditative absorption-consciousness).

== List of 20 Yoga Upanishads ==
List of the Yoga Upanishads
Title	Muktika serial #	Attached Veda	Period of creation
Hamsa Upanishad	15	Shukla Yajurveda	
Amritabindu Upanishad	20	Atharvaveda	Final centuries of BCE or early centuries of the CE.
Nadabindu Upanishad or Amrita Nada Bindu Upanishad	21	Rigveda or Atharvaveda	100 BCE to 300 CE
Kshurika Upanishad	31	Atharvaveda	100 BCE to 300 CE
Tejobindu Upanishad	37	Atharvaveda	100 BCE to 300 CE
Nadabindu Upanishad	38	Atharvaveda or Rigveda	100 BCE to 300 CE
Dhyanabindu Upanishad	39	Atharvaveda and Samaveda	100 BCE to 300 CE
Brahmavidya Upanishad	40	Atharvaveda and Krishna Yajurveda	100 BCE to 300 CE
Yogatattva Upanishad	41	Atharvaveda	100 BCE to 300 CE or about 150 CE or 11th- to 13th-century
Trishikhibrahmana Upanishad	44	Shukla Yajurveda	Early 1st-millennium CE
Yogachudamani Upanishad	46	Samaveda	14th- to 15th-century CE
Mandala-brahmana Upanishad	48	Shukla Yajurveda	Early 1st-millennium CE
Advayataraka Upanishad	53	Shukla Yajurveda	100 BCE to 300 CE
Shandilya Upanishad	58	Atharvaveda	100 BCE to 300 CE
Yogashikha Upanishad	63	Krishna Yajurveda	100 BCE to 300 CE
Pashupatabrahma Upanishad	77	Atharvaveda	Later era
Yoga-kundalini Upanishad	86	Krishna Yajurveda	Common era text, composed sometime after Yoga Sutras
Darshana Upanishad	90	Samaveda	Around 100 BCE to 300 CE
Mahavakya Upanishad	92	Atharvaveda	Around 100 BCE to 300 CE
Varaha Upanishad	98	Krishna Yajurveda	Middle of the 2nd millennium CE

== See also ==
- Hindu texts
- Vedas

== Bibliography ==
- Derek, Coltman (1989). Yoga and the Hindu Tradition. Motilal Banarsidass. ISBN 978-81-208-0543-9.
- Deussen, Paul (1997). Sixty Upanishads of the Veda. Motilal Banarsidass. ISBN 978-81-208-1467-7.
- Deussen, Paul (2010). The Philosophy of the Upanishads. Cosimo, Inc. ISBN 978-1-61640-239-6.
- Flood, Gavin D. (1996), An Introduction to Hinduism, Cambridge University Press, ISBN 978-0521438780
- Mahony, William K. (1998). The Artful Universe: An Introduction to the Vedic Religious Imagination. State University of New York Press. ISBN 978-0-7914-3579-3.
- Mallinson, James (2004). The Gheranda Samhita: The Original Sanskrit and an English Translation. YogaVidya.com. ISBN 978-0-9716466-3-6.
- Sen, S.C. (1937). The Mystical Philosophy Of The Upanishads. Cosmo Publications. ISBN 978-81-307-0660-3.
