= Soham (Sanskrit) =

Sanskrit term

Soham or Sohum (Sanskrit: सो ऽहम्; so'ham) is a Hindu mantra literally meaning "That (is) I" in Sanskrit, implying "I am that". The mantra is a sandhi of saḥ + aham that can be inverted as ham + sa and is printed variously in the English language as So’ham, So Ham, So-aham, So Hum, Saham, Sa'ham, Sau-ha, Sah-karena, and Sahkara, with the latter two forms meaning "the sound of Sa." In Vedic philosophy, Soham means identifying oneself with Brahman, and the combination of so 'haṃ haṃsaḥ has also been interpreted as "I am Swan," where the swan symbolizes the Atman.

== Etymology ==
The term so'ham is related to sa, and the phrase translates to "That (is) I", according to Monier-Williams. Interpreted as a nominal sentence, it can also be read as "I am the absolute" or "Great truth". The term is found in Vedic literature, and is a phrase that identifies "One with the universe or the ultimate one reality".

== History ==
This phrase is found in Principal Upanishads such as the Isha Upanishad (verse 16), which ends:

(...) तेजो यत्ते रूपं कल्याणतमं तत्ते पश्यामि योऽसावसौ पुरुषः सोऽहमस्मि ॥१६॥
tejo yat te rūpaṃ kalyāṇatamaṃ tat te paśyāmi yo 'sāv [asau puruṣaḥ] so'ham asmi
"The light which is thy fairest form, I see it. I am what that is" (trans. Max Müller)

Soham, or "I am That", is very common in ancient and medieval literature. Some examples include:

Upanishads

- Sannyasa Upanishads such as Naradaparivrajaka Upanishad, Nirvana Upanishad, Ashrama Upanishad, Maitreya Upanishad and Satyayaniya Upanishad.
- Yoga Upanishads such as Dhyanabindu Upanishad and Yogashikha Upanishad
- Hamsa Upanishad

Tantras

- Gandharva Tantra
- Kali Tantra
- Kularnava Tantra
- Mahanirvana Tantra
- Niruttara Tantra

Stotras

- Bhaja Gaureesam
- Gowresa Ashtakam
- Shakthi Mahimnah Stotram
- Tripurasundari Vijaya Sthava

Adi Shankara's Vakya Vritti subsequent works in the Nath tradition foundational for Hatha yoga.

- Matsyendranath's Yogavishaya
- Gorakshanath's Siddha Siddhanta Paddhati
- Gorakshanath's Yoga Bija
- Gorakshanath's Goraksha Shataka
- Jñāndev's Lakhota
- Jñāndev's Yogapar Abhangamala
- foundational for Swara yoga the original script Shiva Svarodaya

as well as the classical yoga treatises Gheranda Samhita and Shiva Samhita all make mention of Soham and Hamsa describing its significance and when teaching uniformly teaches "so" on inhalation and "ham" on exhalation.

This traditional practice in its several forms and its background is described in numerous other books.

== Hamsa ==
Swami Muktananda—although teaching the traditional "so" on inhalation and "ham" on exhalation as a letter from 1968 to Franklin Jones reveals—later published a book teaching "ham" on inhalation and "sa" on exhalation. This practice is described in several later books all referring to Muktananda.

The teaching of "ham" on inhalation and "sa" on exhalation is allegedly alluded to in a text of Kaśmir Śaivism, the Vijnana Bhairava:

Air is exhaled with the sound SA and inhaled with the sound HAM. Then reciting of the mantra HAMSA is continuous

— Vijnana Bhairava, 155b

However, this verse 155b is not found in the Vijnana Bhairava first published in 1918 in the Kashmir Series of Text and Studies but is quoted from a commentary by the Abhinavagupta disciple Kṣemarāja in his Shiva Sutra Vimarshini (commentary on the Shiva Sutras) in later editions of Vijnana Bhairava.

== Yoga ==
When used for meditation, Sohum acts as a natural mantra to control one's breathing pattern, to help achieve deep breath, and to gain concentration.

- Sooooo... is the sound of inhalation, and is remembered in the mind along with that inhalation.
- Hummmm... is the sound of exhalation, and is remembered in the mind along with that exhalation.

Soham is also considered a mantra in Tantrism and Kriya Yoga, known also as Ajapa mantra, Ajapa Gayatri, Hamsa Gayatri, Hamsa mantra, prana mantra, Shri Paraprasada mantra, paramatma-mantra, and as such used notably on its own, in the meditation practice ajapa japa and in the kriya practice shabda sanchalana.

== See also ==
- Aham Brahmasmi
- Be, and it is
- I Am that I Am
- Nirvana Shatkam
- Dualism (Indian philosophy)
- Nonduality
- Monism
- Tattvam Asi
