= Brahmavidya Upanishad =

Sanskrit text, Yoga Upanishad

Brahmavidya
- Om
- Devanagari: ब्रह्मविद्या
- IAST: Brahmavidyā
- Title means: Knowledge of Brahman
- Date: ~100 BCE to 300 CE
- Type: Yoga
- Linked Veda: Krishna Yajurveda
- Chapters: 1
- Verses: varies by manuscript (14 to 110)
- Philosophy: Yoga, Vedanta

The Brahmavidya Upanishad (Sanskrit: ब्रह्मविद्या उपनिषत्, IAST: Brahmavidyā Upaniṣad) is a Sanskrit text and one of the minor Upanishads of Hinduism. It is one of twenty Yoga Upanishads in the four Vedas.

Two major versions of its manuscripts are known. One has fourteen verses that is attached to Atharvaveda, while another larger manuscript exists in the Telugu language which has one hundred and ten verses and is attached to the Krishna Yajurveda.

The Upanishad mainly explains the structure of Om, aspect of its sound, its placement, its beginning and end, and the significance of the Laya (fading away of its sound). Om is Brahman (ultimate reality), asserts the text. The text is notable for stating that gods live inside human body as five Atmans, with Vishnu in the throat, Rudra in the middle of the palate, Shiva in the forehead, Sadashiva at the tip of nose, and the Brahman in the heart. The innermost Atman, states the text, is same as the all transcendent Paramatman, the Brahman pervading everywhere.

It is also called as Brahmavidyopanishad. It is listed at number 40 in the serial order of the Muktika enumerated by Rama to Hanuman in the modern era anthology of 108 Upanishads.

== Chronology ==
The text was, states Mircea Eliade, possibly composed after the Maitri Upanishad. He dates it in the same period as the didactic parts of the Mahabharata, the chief Sannyasa Upanishads and along with other early Yoga Upanishads such as Brahmabindu, Ksurika, Tejobindu, Yogatattva, Nadabindu, Yogashikha, Dhyanabindu and Amritabindu. These and the Brahmavidya text, adds Eliade, were composed earlier than the ten or eleven later yogic Upanishads such as the Yoga-kundali, Varaha and Pashupatabrahma Upanishads.

Gavin Flood dates the Brahmavidya text, along with other Yoga Upanishads, to be probably from the 100 BCE to 300 CE period.

== Contents ==
The secret knowledge of Yoga

This science should be bestowed on a devoted pupil,
who looks up to his Guru, and is dedicated,
to a householder or Brahmachari,
to a Vanaprasthi or mendicant,
the yogic knowledge gives eternal bliss.

—Brahmavidya Upanishad 46-56

The Brahmavidya Upanishad has 110 verses. The key issues dealt with in the scripture are Brahmavidya – the knowledge of Brahman, the character of Brahman, the Om symbol and an individual's nature of self-consciousness, human attachments and freedom therefrom.

The first ten verses say that Om is composed of the three syllables, naming A, u and m. The syllable “m” is added a diacritic (Anusvara) in the form of dot (bindu) above it which gives the word a spiritual sound. The syllables are compared with three Vedas as well as three worlds – Svarga (heaven, upper realms), Prithvi (earth) and Patala (lower realms). It is stated as representing the sun, moon and fire (agni). The Sushumna Nadi (channel) which runs along the spinal cord of the body is described. The sun's brightness emanating from 72,000 channels is compared to the Sushumna.

The chanting of Om by the sage causes him to be one with the Brahman, in a similar fashion as the sound of bells coalesce into “sound of peace” releasing him from his strong convictions. The sound of Om is compared to the sound made by a metallic vessel or the sound of a bell, which gradually terminates into silence.

The supreme self (Atman), asserts the text, lives in the heart. To know that self, is to be released from all bondage. This knowledge is achieved with devotion and dedication to a preceptor (Guru), and consists in the realization of the nondual identity of the self and Brahman, accompanied by a renunciation of all attachments.

The text states that chanting the soham which means “I am that”, is akin to chanting Om and it enables realization of self in the same way as ghee (clarified butter) is sourced to milk. The chanting done, with the cords in the middle of the body, is compared to the realization one attains through yogic exercise of the Kundalini. The "Supreme Self" (Paramatman) is compared to the hamsa bird residing in the heart of all as soul; the self-realization of which frees one of worldly bondages.

The Guru

इत्येषं त्रिविधो ज्ञेय आचार्यस्तु महीतले ।
चोदको दर्शयेन्मार्गं बोधकः स्थानमाचरेत् ॥ ५२॥
मोक्षदस्तु परं तत्त्वं यज्ज्ञात्वा परमश्नुते ।
प्रत्यक्षयजनं देहे सङ्क्षेपाच्छृणु गौतम ॥ ५३॥

The best Acharya (Guru) is the prompter, the awakener, and the bestower of liberation. He points the path, shows the way to meditation practice. He awakens the means to know self through "That thou art, thou art that". He bestows liberation through the Brahman knowledge, "all is of my form, there is not even a speck beyond me".

—Brahmavidya Upanishad 52-53

The practice of yogic exercises, through a guru (who is identified as the Lord), has the power to realize the ultimate self and Brahman, and thus detach oneself from the life cycle, Veda and sciences and so forth. The realization of Paramatman is said to be achieved only via a guru or the Vedas. The nature of Paramatman is explained further and identified with the deities Brahma, Vishnu, Shiva and Purusha.

The text describes the difference between jiva (the living being) and Brahman (the infinite Self). Five selves are related to five Pancha-Brahma deities Brahma, Vishnu, Rudra, Maheshvara and Sadashiva. They are said to reside in "the heart, throat, palate, forehead and the tip of the nose" in the body. For example, Brahman is said to be positioned 12 aṅgula (a finger's breadth) from the extreme end of the nose. It is the location whose control can bring back the breath, and link it to the mind to achieve the secret of utmost happiness, which will be oblivious to the externalities of sight and feelings.

Yoga, which enables one to attain to be rid of aspects of good and evil, is to be imparted only by a guru to a student who deserves it and has the sincerity of devotion and desire to learn it.

== Commentary ==
A part of the text is found in chapter 8 of the Kubjika Upanishad, states Jan Schoterman, in the discussion of the Pranava (Om). Paul Deussen translated the shorter manuscript of the Upanishad with 14 verses.

== See also ==
- Brahma Upanishad
- Jabala Upanishad
- Yogatattva Upanishad
- Yoga Vasistha
