= Yogachudamani Upanishad =

Yogachudamani
- Devanagari: योगचूडामणि
- IAST: Yogacūḍāmaṇi
- Title means: Crown jewel of yoga
- Type: Yoga
- Linked Veda: Samaveda
- Verses: 121
- Philosophy: Tantra

The Yogachudamani Upanishad (Sanskrit: योगचूडामणि उपनिषत्, IAST: Yogacūḍāmaṇi Upaniṣad) is one of the minor Upanishads of Hinduism composed in Sanskrit, and translates to "Crown Jewel of Yoga". Attached to the Samaveda, it is one of twenty Yoga Upanishads in the four Vedas.

The text is notable for its discussions of Kundalini yoga.

== History ==
The text has been a reference for studies on Kundalini theories and tantra traditions. Richard Rosen dates Yogachudamani Upanishad to about 14th- to 15th-century CE. Swami Satyadharma Saraswati says that this Upanishad is an advanced treatise for higher sadhana or learning for Yogins. Its Kundalini discussion has been a precursor to related books on the subject.

It is also referred to as Yoga-cudamany Upanishad and Yogachudamanyupanisad (योगचूडामण्युपनिषत्). It is listed at number 46 in the serial order of the Muktika enumerated by Rama to Hanuman in the modern era anthology of 108 Upanishads, and in printed in 1883 in the Telugu language though with some errors The Upanishad under the Sama Veda is one of the ten Upanishads of the Raja Yoga genre.

== Contents ==
Purpose of Yoga

The purpose of yoga is to unite these two principles as so that Shiva and Shakti become one within the self.

— Yogachudamani Upanishad

The Upanishad is mostly poetic verses, and structured as one chapter with one hundred and twenty one verses. The opening verses of the text assert its goal to be the attainment of Kaivalya (liberating aloneness). The first seventy verses present its theories of Kundalini yoga including a discussion of chakras (energy centers), nadis (blood and energy vessels), prana vayus (life force air), mudras and shakti (power). The rest of the text describes meditative exercises with Om, asserting that enlightenment is achievable by combining Hatha yoga, Kundalini yoga and reflection on one's innermost consciousness. In the closing verses, the text asserts that just like a lion or elephant can be tamed in slow stages, various illness of the body can be tamed with asanas and breathing exercises, and state of liberating consciousness and mental fortitude achieved with higher limbs of yoga.

Kundalini as sleeping Goddess

The great Goddess (the Kundalini) sleeps with her face closing that door. Waking by the conjoint action of fire and the mind along with vital air, she, gathering her body, moves upwards like a needle through the Sushumna.

— Yogachudamani Upanishad 38-39

The Upanishad states that there are 72,000 nerves emanating from the location, which is below the navel but over the procreation organ in the form of an "egg-like bulb or knot," known as the nerve center, of which only 72 have been named. The text is notable for its discussion of sexual fluids over verses 55 to 64, calling it bindu of two colors: Shukla (pale white, male) and Rajas (red, female). The text asserts that both have creative powers, the Shukla is Brahman (universal principle) and the Rajas is the Shakti (energy, power). The highest state of union is the unification of these two in Yoni-mudra, according to the text. In later verses, the female and the male continue to be a part of its discussion, stating Para Shakti as the essence of pure radiance, Brahma as mobility, Vishnu as rhythm, Rudra as inertia, and Indra as enjoyment. The text asserts that these deities are present in Pranava syllable (Om mantra) it discusses for meditation.

== See also ==
- Chakras
- Kundalini yoga
- Tantra
- Yoga-kundalini Upanishad
