= Hamsa Upanishad =

Sanskrit text

Hamsa
- The text discusses meditating on Om and one's soul in several chapters
- Devanagari: हंस
- Title means: Swan
- Date: 2nd millennium common era
- Type: Yoga
- Linked Veda: Shukla Yajurveda
- Chapters: 11
- Philosophy: Tantra, Shaktism, Yoga

The Hamsa Upanishad (Sanskrit: हंसोपनिषद्) is a Sanskrit text and a minor Upanishad of Hinduism. It is classified as one of the twenty Yoga Upanishads, and attached to the Shukla Yajurveda. The text or parts of the text is a relatively late origin, probably from the 2nd-millennium of the common era, but written before early 17th-century, because Dara Shikoh included it in the Persian translation of the Upanishads as Oupanekhat, spelling it as Hensnad (Hamsa-nada).

The Hamsa Upanishad is structured as a disorganized medley of ideas, in the form of a discourse between Hindu sage Gautama and the divine Sanatkumara, on the knowledge of Hamsa-vidya as a prelude to Brahmavidya. The text describes the sound of Om, its relation to Hamsa, and how meditating on this prepares one on the journey towards realizing Paramahamsa.

Several versions of the Hamsa Upanishad exist, of which the Calcutta and Poona editions have been most studied. The layout and some verses vary, but the message is similar. The text is listed at number 15 in the serial order of the Muktika enumerated by Rama to Hanuman in the modern era anthology of 108 Upanishads. It is also called the Hamsopanishad.

== Etymology ==
According to Paul Deussen, Hamsa in Indian tradition can refer to the migrating "goose, swan or flamingo", and symbolizes the "migrating soul" or reincarnating soul.

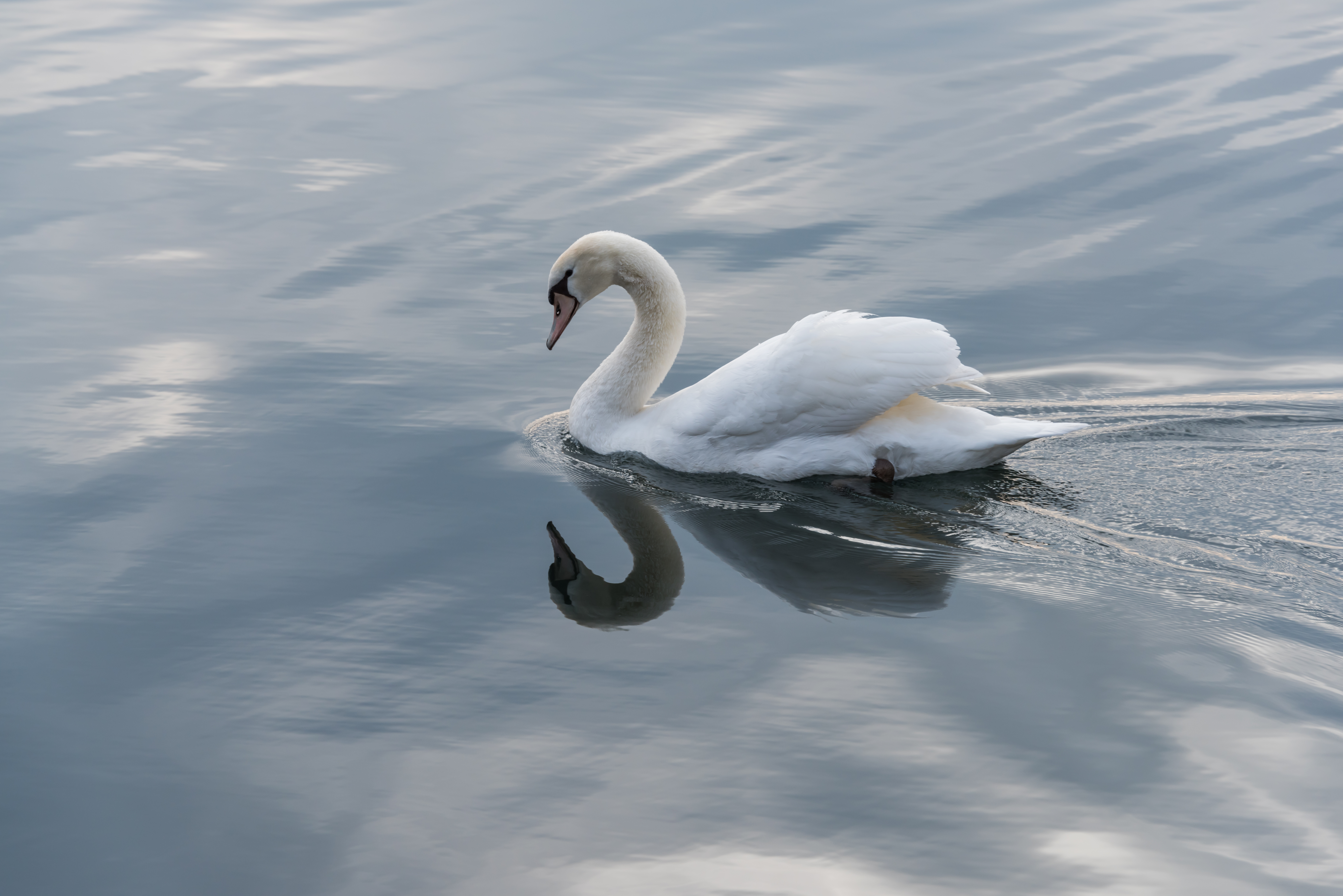
Hamsa refers to a migratory bird, such as "swan, goose, flamingo", it reflects Om symbol, and symbolizes Atman.

The word Hamsa as a symbolism for Atman and moksha appears in numerous ancient texts of Hinduism. Vogel suggested in 1952, that Hamsa in Hindu texts could be symbolism for goose, rather than swan. Dave, in 2005, stated that the hymns of Rigveda, and verses in Hindu Epics and Puranas mention a variety of birds with the root of hamsa (हंस), such as Maha-hamsa, Raj-hamsa, Kal-hamsa and others, most of which relate to various species of swans particularly mute swan, while some refer to geese. Dave's identification is based on the details provided in the Sanskrit texts about the changes in plumage over the bird's life, described voice, migratory habits, courtship rituals and flying patterns. Some Sanskrit texts, states Dave, distinguish between Hamsa and Kadamb, the former being swan and latter as bar-headed goose. Regardless of whether it is goose or swan, the word in the title is symbolism for something that migrates, is transcendent.

The text title likely refers to it being a treatise for individual soul, seeking the highest soul (Paramahamsa).

== Contents ==
The text opens with Gautama asking Sanatkumara to distill the knowledge of all Vedas for him. Sanatkumara states that Shiva pondered over the Vedas and answered the same question from Parvati. It is the knowledge of Yoga, the shrouded mystery of yogins, the path of the Hamsa, which he will share with Gautama.

Sanatkumara states this knowledge is meant for those Yoga students who are self-restrained, have abandoned craving for the worldly pleasures and are devoted to learning from a Guru (teacher).

=== The arrival of Hamsa ===
Breath is sound, states the text, and one that stays in all human bodies all their life, filling them with energy.

At our birth it enters into us, the migratory bird!
like the fire, invisibly present in the wood,
like the oil hidden in the sesame seed,
it dwells in the deepest depth of us:
to know that (the bird) is to free oneself from death.

— Hamsa Upanishad, Translated by Jean Varenne

Hamsa, states Jean Varenne, is the symbolism for Atman (soul).

=== The chakras ===
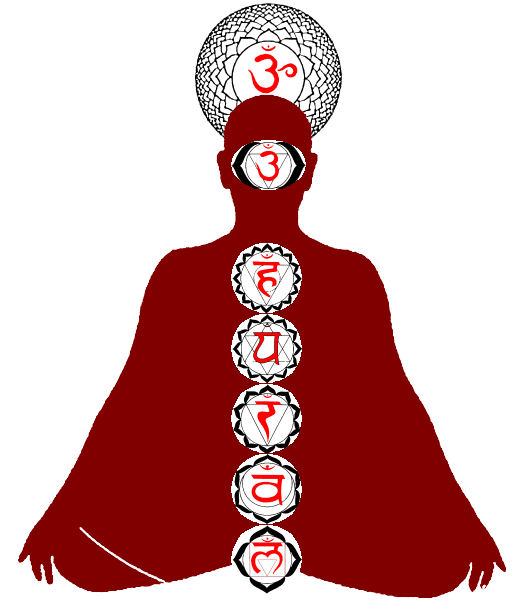
Yogin with six chakras

Chapter 3 of the text describes a tantra process to energize the chakras. With the heels pressed at the anal opening, raise your breathing from the “Muladhara chakra” (located just below spinal cord) towards the "Svāḍhishthāna" (located near the genital organ), circumambulate there three times, then raise it to the “Maṇipūraka” (solarplexes or navel chakra). The yogi then raises the breath to the “Anāhata” (located in the heart), cross it and then having placed “prana” (life force) in “Viśuḍḍhi” (throat chakra at root of the neck), then lead the breath to “Ājñā” (third-eye chakra between the two eyebrows), and contemplate on Brahmarandhra (the thousand petalled crown chakra, which is located at the top of the head). Thus must the Yogin begin meditating, "The three matras (Om, Brahman) is me". The yogi, asserts the text, should think about the Om reverberation, for that is Brahman, the highest Atman.

=== Hamsa is an aphorism ===
Hamsa is part of the aphorism, namely Hamso Hamsa, states the text, where Hamsa (soul) is the poet, the Pankti is the meter (denoting "Avyakṭā Gāyaṭrī" in the Poona manuscript), the Ham is the bija (seed of things), Sa representing Shakti, and So'ham (I am He) is the middle. A yogi experiences 21,606 Hamsas (21,600 in some manuscripts) in one full day and night cycle, states the text (where each inbreathing and outbreathing is counted separate). The text describes six mantra aphorisms, each starting with Om, and relating to Hamsa.

=== Hamsa is the lotus in one's heart ===
Hamsa must be meditated upon, states chapter 6 of the Upanishad, in the eight petal (a lotus flower) in the heart. The bird should be visualized, translated Paul Deussen, with Agni and Soma as his wings, the Om as his head and neck, the Anusvara (the curve and dot above the Om sign) its beak with eye, Rudra as his one feet and Rudrani the other, Kala as his left side and Agni the right, his sight is set above and is homeless below him.

This Hamsa is that Paramahamsa (the highest soul), states chapter 7, that pervades the universe and shines like ten million suns.

Each petal of the lotus, which a yogi meditates on, is then mapped to actions of the yogi, in chapter 8 of the text. East facing petal represents noble actions; the petal in south eastern direction denotes sleep and indolence; petal facing south west should remind him of evil actions; the west facing petal of play; the petal facing north-west creates urge to walk and other actions; petal facing north indicates enjoying love and lust; the north east facing petal shows ambition to amass wealth.

The center of the lotus flower, asserts the text, represents renunciation. The stamen is indicative of wakeful state; the "pericarp", the outer layer denotes the sleep dreaming state; bija (seed) of lotus is “sushupti” meaning dreamless sleep; above the flower and leaving the lotus is akin to “Turya” state or the experience of pure consciousness – the "fourth state".

=== Hamsa has will ===
The Turya state is reached, states the Upanishad, when the Hamsa within is merged in the reverberation of the Om, not because of Manas (mind), but because of the will of the Hamsa (soul).

=== Hamsa is music ===
There are ten stages of "inner nada" which are heard successively as sounds; first "chini", then "chini-chini", third a bell, fourth a "conch" or Shankha (Sea shell), fifth of a "tantiri" (lute, string instrument), sixth like clapping, seventh of a flute, eighth is the music of a "bheri" (a drum), ninth of "mridangam" (with double sides, kettle drum), and tenth like a "thunder" (sound of lightning). Ayyangar describes these "inner nada" states to have Tantric meaning, and its explanation is whispered in the right ear of the seeker.

=== The destination of Hamsa ===
One must avoid the first nine, states the text, and seek the tenth music because it relates to Hamsa. It is in tenth state where the yogi realizes Brahman, his Atman and Brahman become one, the duality vanishes. The yogi then shines, his doubts destroyed, his desires vanish, calmness, enlightenment, bliss becomes him.

== See also ==
- Yoga (philosophy)
- Yoga-kundalini Upanishad
- Yogatattva Upanishad
- Yoga Vasistha
