= Amritabindu Upanishad =

Sanskrit text, Yoga Upanishad

- Devanagari: अमृतबिन्दु
- Title means: Drop of nectar
- Date: 100 BCE to 300 CE
- Linked Veda: Krishna Yajurveda or Atharvaveda
- Verses: Varies with versions, 22 or 38
- Philosophy: Yoga

The Amritabindu Upanishad (Sanskrit:अमृतबिन्दु उपनिषद्) is one of the minor Upanishads of Hinduism. It is one of the five Bindu Upanishads, attached to the Atharvaveda, and one of twenty Yoga Upanishads in the four Vedas.

The text is notable for condemning "bookish learning" and emphasizing practice, as well as for presenting a six limbed Yoga system which match five stages of the eight stage Patanjali's Yogasutras and offering a unique, different sixth stage.

The Amṛitabindu is listed at number 20 in the serial order of the Muktika enumerated by Rama to Hanuman in the modern era anthology of 108 Upanishads. The text sometimes appears under the title Brahmabindu Upanishad or Amritanada Upanishad, in some anthologies. It shares over 20 Vedanta-philosophy related verses with Amritanada Upanishad in compilations where these two texts are separated into independent Upanishads.

== Nomenclature ==
Paul Deussen states that the title has two meanings, the first being "the esoteric doctrine of a bindu (point) or nada (reverberation) of the word Om which signifies Brahman", while the second meaning is a drop which grants immortality. The discussion of Om by the text, states Deussen, suggests that the former meaning may be more appropriate. It is one of five Upanishads whose title has the suffix "binduer" meaning "drop", while “amrita” represents the nectar of immortality like ambrosia in Greek literature parlance, but here its real emphasis is on mind. Amritabindu Upanishad, also meaning "Immortal Point," differentiates between vocal recitation of the Om syllable and its non-vocal practice.

The different names of similar texts may be the result of a scribal error that persisted as the text spread across India. However, the number of verses vary between the manuscripts, ranging from twenty two verses in Ayyangar translation, and 38 in Deussen translation.

The text, states Deussen, has also been referred to as Amritanada Upanishad by medieval Indian scholars such as Sayana of the Vijayanagara Empire. David Gordon White states that Bindu and Nada Upanishads were related, deriving their nomenclature from the symbol Om and its relation to meditation on the Brahman metaphysical reality, the Nada texts "all show some similarities to the bindu texts", and may have origins in the Tantric traditions. The text of Amritabindu Upanishad, states White, appears under the title of Brahmabindu Upanishad in some older anthology.

== Chronology and anthology ==
Mircea Eliade suggests that Amritabindu Upanishad was possibly composed in the same period as the didactic parts of the Mahabharata, the chief Sannyasa Upanishads and along with other early Yoga Upanishads: Brahmabindu (probably composed about the same time as Maitri Upanishad), Ksurika, Tejobindu, Brahmavidya, Nadabindu, Yogashikha, Dhyanabindu and Yogatattva Upanishad. Eliade's suggestion places these in the final centuries of BCE or early centuries of the CE. All these, adds Eliade, were likely composed earlier than the ten or eleven later Yoga Upanishads such as the Yoga-kundali, Varaha and Pashupatabrahma Upanishads.

Paul Deussen states that this text may have preceded Patanjali's Yogasutras text, because it lists six instead of eight limbs for yoga, and both Maitri Upanishad in section 6.18 and Amritabindu place Dharana after Dhyana, a sequence that is reverse of what is found in the Yogasutras and all later Yoga texts of Hinduism. Both Maitri and Amritabindu, adds Deussen, include the concept of Tarka in their verses, which may be important to their relative dating.

Gavin Flood dates the Amritabindu text, along with other Yoga Upanishads, to be probably from the 100 BCE to 300 CE period.

This Upanishad is among those which have been differently attached to two Vedas, depending on the region where the manuscript was found. Deussen states it and all Bindu Upanishads are attached to the Atharvaveda, while Ayyangar states it attached to the Krishna Yajurveda.

In Colebrooke's version of 52 Upanishads popular in north India, the text is listed at number 19 along with the other four Bindu Upanishads with similar theme. The Narayana anthology also includes this Upanishad at number 11 in Bibliothica Indica. In the collection of Upanishads under the title "Oupanekhat", put together by Sultan Mohammed Dara Shikhoh in 1656, consisting of a Persian translation of 50 Upanishads and who prefaced it as the best book on religion, it is listed at number 26 and is named Ambart bandeh(also known as Amrtabindu or Brahmabindu).

== Structure ==
The text opens with an introduction consisting of four verses, followed by four sections of which three discuss the practice, rules and rewards of yoga, followed by a discourse on life-force (Prana, breath). The text ends with a one verse summary.

Like almost all other Yoga Upanishads, the text is composed in verse form.

The Amritabindu Upanishad is part of a group of five Bindu Upanishads, all dedicated to Yoga. All five of Bindu Upanishads emphasize the practice of Yoga and Dhyana (meditation) with Om, to apprehend Atman (soul, self).

== Contents ==
=== Introduction ===
Role of Mind

It is indeed the mind that is the cause of men's bondage and liberation.
The mind that is attached to sense-objects leads to bondage, while dissociated from sense objects it tends to lead to liberation.
So they think.

— Amritabindu Upanishad

The text opens stating that it is the wise, who after reading the text books repeatedly, throw away the books and proceed to the practice of yoga with meditation on the silent, invisible Om, in their pursuit of the Brahman-knowledge (ultimate unchanging reality). This lack of interest and esteem in learning or study of the Vedas is found in other Bindu Upanishads, states Deussen, and may reflect ancient trend among Yogins. In the initial verses the Upanishad differentiates the mind under pure and impure states, and assigns its character as "bondage and liberation". Further enquiry into the crux of the matter reveals that Truth is realized within Vasudev, which is one's Self.

=== The practice of yoga ===
The Amritabindu Upanishad states that there are six limbs of yoga, whose sequence and one limb is different from Patanjali's Yogasutras:

1. Pratyahara: the withdrawal of mind and sensory organs from external objects, and redirecting them to introspection. (Verses 5–6)
2. Dhyanam: meditation. (Verses 5–6)
3. Pranayama: breathing exercises consisting of Rechaka (exhaling completely), Paraka (inhaling deeply) and Kumbhaka (retaining breath for various intervals). (Verses 7–14)
4. Dharana: concentrated introspection on Atman (soul, self) with one's mind. (Verse 15)
5. Tarka: reflecting and inner reasoning between one's mind and soul. This is missing in the Yogasutras. (Verse 16)
6. Samadhi: communion with and in one's soul. (Verse 16)

The verse 10 of the Upanishad recommends internally reciting Gayatri, Vyahrtis and Pranava (Om) mantras as counters to time the length of the breathing exercises, while the section reminds the yogi to drink water and breath deeply to cleanse the body and senses.

=== The rules of yoga ===
Some rules of yoga

Against fear, against anger, against sloth,
Against too much waking, against too much sleeping,
Against too much eating, against starvation,
A Yogin shall always be on his guard.

— Amritabindu Upanishad Verse 27

The verse 17 of the text begins the rules and recommendation for yoga practice. It begins by stating that one must pick a proper place for yoga, which translates Deussen, is "a level surface of ground, pleasant and free from faults". Place a mat, settle in, and enter an Asana, states the Upanishad, such as Padmasana, Svastikasana or even Bhadrasana. The yogi should face north, perform breathing exercises, alternating with the two nostrils, then in the state of comfort and being pacific, say Om and begin meditating.

Close and cast your eyes within, asserts the text in verse 22, sit motionless, practice yoga. Reach rhythmic breathing, concentrate, chain in the mind, reflect and reason, and proceed towards the union in the soul. It is unclear, states Deussen, whether the text implies union of individual soul with highest soul (Anquetil's interpretation), or Prana and Apana (Narayana's interpretation), or is a choice left to the yogi.

The yogi should be silent, still, lost from the outer world, reflecting or remembering the sacred syllable (Om) internally. In verse 27, the Upanishad lists the Yamas (ethics of yogi with others) and Niyamas (ethics of yogi with one's own body).

=== The rewards of yoga ===
Three months of dedicated yoga practice, asserts verse 28 of the text, begins to bring rewards to body. In four months the yogi sees the Devas within, strength marks the yogi in five months, and after six months from starting yoga there is an "absoluteness of will" and sense of blissful aloneness, independence (Kaivalya) in the yogi states verse 29. The verses 30–31 describe how meditation and concentration on different moras of the Om syllable, the yogi thinks through soul and in soul alone.

=== Theory of Prana ===
In some versions of the manuscript found in India, this section is much larger or called as Amritabindu Upanishad while the yoga part is titled separately as Amritanada Upanishad. Many medieval Indian scholars considered these as one. Ayyangar has translated this as a separate Upanishad. The two Upanishads when separate, states White, share over 20 similar verses. This section, adds White, represent exclusively classical Vedanta philosophy methods and goals.

To quote Swami Madhavananda – "the Amritabindu Upanishad inculcates, first, the control of the mind in the shape of desire-less-ness for sense-objects, as the most effective way to the attainment of liberation and the realisation of the One who is Knowledge and Bliss Absolute. Then, it discusses the real nature of the soul and the realisation of the highest truth which leads to unity. Thus, the central theme of all the Upanishads – viz., "that the Jiva and Brahman are eternally one, and that all duality is a mere superimposition due to ignorance" is described in this text.

Oneness of Atman in all beings

Cows are of various colors, milk is one-colored,
the wise man looks upon soul as milk,
of bodies as cows of different garbs,
knowledge is hidden, as butter in milk.

— Amritabindu Upanishad

मन एव मनुष्याणां कारणं बन्धमोक्षयोः |
बन्धाय विषयासक्तं मुक्तं निर्विषयं स्मृतम् |२|

In the above verse, Amritabindu Upanishad states that the mind is the cause of bondage and liberation. A mind that craves for something else is in bondage, one that doesn't is liberated. Spirituality is geared to obtain inner purity, calmness of the mind, and ultimately, liberation. In the state of liberation the mental components like virtue and vice become irrelevant.

This section of Amritabindu text presents the Vedanta theory of non-dualism (Advaita). It states that "there is only one Self in all creatures, that one appears many just as the moon appears many when reflected in many droplets", and the toughest connection yet most liberating connection one can make is with one's own Self (soul), which is difficult because it is concealed by Maya. When one successfully removes this veil, look within, one realizes the Self and its unity with the eternal, indestructible, unchanging truth that is one with the universe.

=== Conclusion ===
The text concludes with a single verse, asserting that one who has realized this knowledge is never reborn again, no matter where he dies.

== See also ==
- Yoga-kundalini Upanishad
- Yogatattva Upanishad
- Yoga Vasistha
