= Yogashikha Upanishad =

Minor Upanishad of Hinduism

Yogashikha
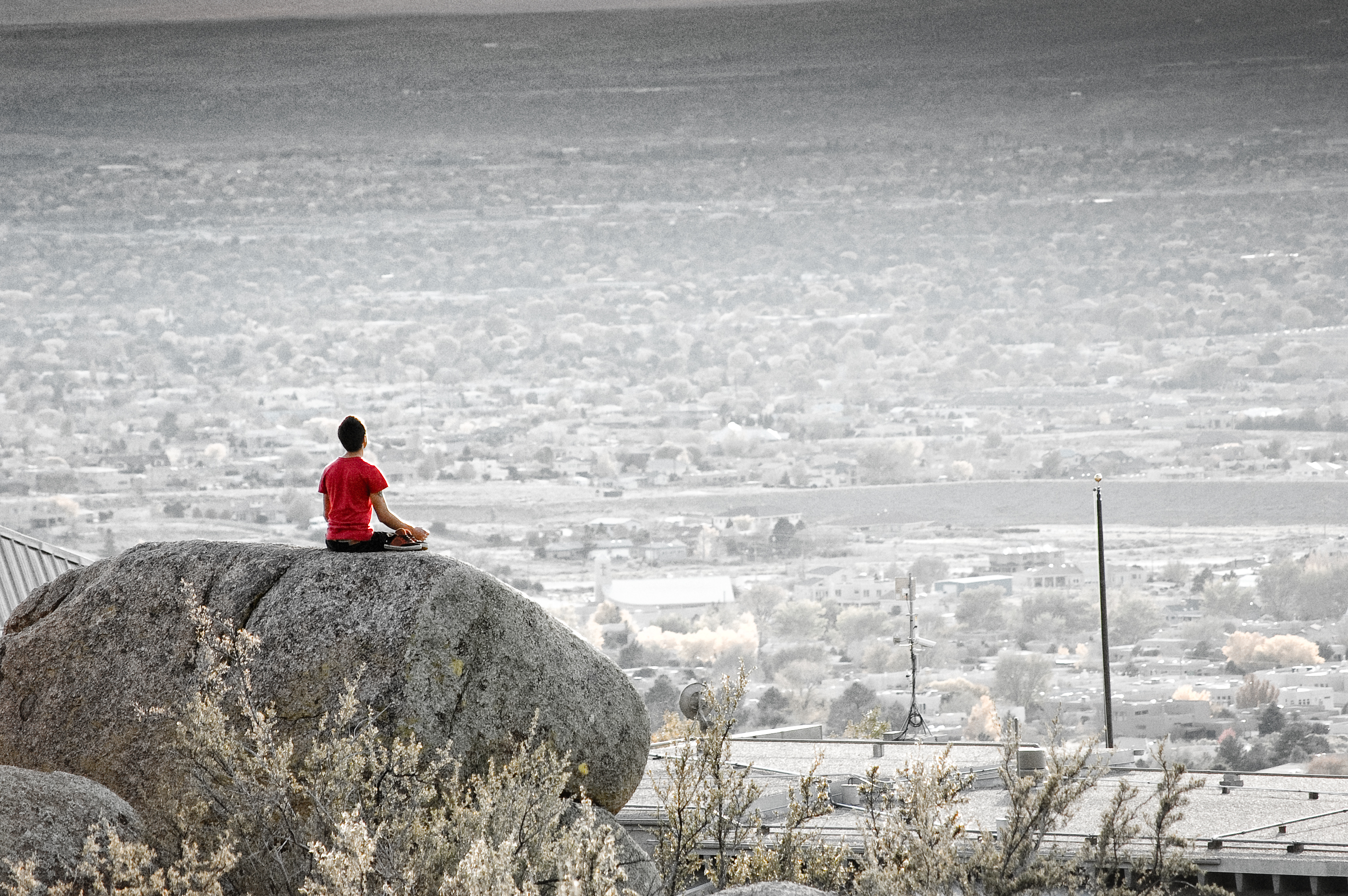
- Yoga is the highest of knowledge states the text
- Devanagari: योगशिखा
- IAST: Yogaśikhā
- Title means: Peak of Yogic meditation
- Type: Yoga
- Linked Veda: Krishna Yajurveda or Atharvaveda
- Chapters: varies by manuscript (1 to 6)
- Verses: varies by manuscript (~10 to 390)
- Philosophy: Yoga, Vedanta

The Yogashikha Upanishad (Sanskrit: योगशिखा उपनिषत्, IAST: Yogaśikhā Upaniṣad) is a Sanskrit text and one of the minor Upanishads of Hinduism. It is one of twenty Yoga Upanishads in the four Vedas.

Two versions of the Yogashikha Upanishad exist, one short that is attached to the Atharvaveda in some anthologies, and a long version which is often found attached to the Krishna Yajurveda in Telugu language anthologies. The long version consists of six chapters, and is about forty times longer than the short version. The short version appears interspersed within the first chapter of the long version.

== History ==
The Yogashikha is an ancient text, states Mircea Eliade, who suggests a relative chronology. He dates it to the same period when the following Hindu texts were composed – Maitri Upanishad, the didactic parts of the Mahabharata, the chief Sannyasa Upanishads and along with other early Yoga Upanishads such as Brahmabindu, Brahmavidya, Tejobindu, Yogatattva, Nadabindu, Kshurika, Dhyanabindu and Amritabindu. These texts along with the Yogashikha Upanishad, adds Eliade, were composed earlier than the ten or eleven later yogic Upanishads such as the Yoga-kundali, Varaha and Pashupatabrahma Upanishads. Gavin Flood dates this text, along with other Yoga Upanishads, to be probably from the 100 BCE to 300 CE period.

Meditation

The Unpracticed one will be pulled out of meditation by the senses, even if he forcefully tries to control them.

—Yogashikha Upanishad

Georg Feuerstein calls the Yogashikha Upanishad, as the "Crest of Yoga" and the "most comprehensive of the Yoga Upanishads". The ideas found in Yogashikha are shared in many Hatha Yoga texts such as those by Gorakhnath.

Some manuscripts of the text are titled as Yoga-sikhopanisad (योगशिखोपनिषत्). It is listed at number 63 in the serial order of the Muktika enumerated by Rama to Hanuman in the modern era anthology of 108 Upanishads. In the Colebrooke's version of 52 Upanishads, popular in north India, it is listed at number 22. The Narayana anthology, popular in South India, also includes this Upanishad at number 22 in Bibliothica Indica. In the collection of Upanishads under the title "Oupanekhat", put together by Sultan Mohammed Dara Shikhoh in 1656, consisting of a Persian translation of 50 Upanishads and who prefaced it as the best book on religion, the Yogashika is listed at number 20 and is named Djog Sank'ha. According to Alain Daniélou, this Upanishad is one of the 12 Raja Yoga Upanishads, seven of which are attached to the Krishna Yajurveda and five to the Shukla Yajurveda.

The text was influential on medieval Hindu literature such as in section 1.2 of the early 12th-century encyclopedic text Manasollasa, and the Hath yoga literature such as the Yogabīja.

== Contents ==
Atman, Brahman

There is no god higher than one's own Atman (soul), there is no worship higher than its investigation, there is no happiness higher than inner satisfaction. – Verses 2.20–2.21

The immediate cause of the phenomenal world is no other than the Brahman. Hence this phenomenal world in its entirety is the Brahman alone and nothing else. – Verses 4.3–4.4

—Yogashikha Upanishad

The text is composed in poetic verse style. The chapter 1, the longest, includes a discussion of the role of yoga in achieving moksha, that is liberation while living (Jivanmukta), and contrasts it to Videhamukti (liberation in afterlife). The first chapter asserts Om to be Mula-Mantra (root mantra), and describes it to be part masculine Shiva and part feminine Shakti. It asserts that anger, greed and such psychological states to be defects that ultimately lead to sorrow, that the pure being is one who is beyond these, a state that can only be achieved through simultaneous pursuit of knowledge and yoga.

The Telugu language anthology edition of Yogashikha Upanishad is notable for its discussion of Jnana-Yoga (path of knowledge).

Chapters 1 and 5 of the text discuss six kinds of Yoga, Kundalini and five fires within a human body. It asserts that the awareness of Chakra with Hatha Yoga practice is a form of spiritual experience. The human body, metaphorically asserts the text, is the temple of Vishnu, as Brahman. It is incorrect to regard one's eternal Atman (self, soul) to be same as the temporal body.

The Upanishad explains Brahma Granthi as the first knot of the Kundalini, being situated in the Muladhara chakra (the root chakra). Tantric texts are different from Yogashikha Upanishad, states Harish Johri, because they identify Brahma Granthi to be positioned in the Manipura Chakra which is the third chakra. The text, states Georg Feuerstein, suggests Yoga is a journey and recommends a steady spiritual practice with a Guru (teacher).

The Upanishad calls one's Guru as the one who is a spiritual guide and one worthy of devotion, praising the Guru as Brahman, Vishnu, Achyuta, identical to one's Atman (soul), declaring that there is no one greater in the universe than one's Guru. The verse 2.22 states that those who have faith in Ishvara and Guru will become great. The last chapter of the Upanishad emphasizes the importance of Dhyana (meditation) on the highest self, Hamsa and Om.

The variation in the manuscripts suggest corruption of the text over time, states Deussen, such as the abrupt, non-metric addition of "reciting this text thrice a day leads to liberation" in verse 8 of the short version.

== See also ==
- Hatha yoga
- Yoga (philosophy)
- Yogatattva Upanishad
- Yoga Vasistha
