= Adhyāsa =

Concept in Hindu philosophy

Adhyāsa (Sanskrit: अध्यास Superimposition) is a concept in Hindu philosophy referring to the superimposition of an attribute, quality, or characteristic of one entity onto another entity. In Advaita Vedanta, Adhyasa means a false superimposition of the characteristics of physical body (birth, death, skin color etc.) onto the atman, and also the false superimposition of the characteristics of Atman (sentiency, existence) onto the physical body.

== Origin ==
The first mention of Adhyasa is found within the Brahma Sutra Bhasya of Adi Shankara. Adi Shankara begins his commentary of the Brahma Sutras by explaining what Adhyasa is and its nature.

Shankara lists different views about Adhyasa from different philosophical schools, which suggests that the concept of Adhyasa certainly existed before Shankara.

== Definition ==
In his introduction to the commentary on Brahma Sutras, Shankara gives a definition of Adhyasa as thus -

आह कोऽयमध्यासो नामेति। उच्यते स्मृतिरूपः परत्र पूर्वदृष्टावभासः। तं केचित् अन्यत्रान्यधर्माध्यास इति वदन्ति। केचित्तु यत्र यदध्यासः तद्विवेकाग्रहनिबन्धनो भ्रम इति। अन्ये तु यत्र यदध्यासः तस्यैव विपरीतधर्मत्वकल्पनामाचक्षते। सर्वथापि तु अन्यस्यान्यधर्मावभासतां न व्यभिचरति। तथा च लोकेऽनुभवः शुक्तिका हि रजतवदवभासते एकश्चन्द्रः सद्वितीयवदिति।।

Swami Gambhirananda translates it as -

If it be asked, "What is it that is called Superimposition?"- the answer is - "It is awareness, similar in nature to memory, that arises on a foreign (different) location as a result of some past experience. With regards to this, some say that it consists in the superimposition of the attributes on one thing on another. But others assert that wherever a superimposition on anything occurs, there is only a confusion arising from the absence of distinction between them. Others say that the superimposition of anything on any other substratum consists in fancying some opposite attribute on the very basis. From every point of view, however, there is no difference as regards the appearance of one thing as something else. And in accord with this, we find common experience that the nacre appears as silver, and a single moon appears as two."

Karl H. Potter translates it as -

Now what is superimposition ? It is the appearance (ābhāsa), in the form of a memory, of something previously experienced in some other place. Other philosophers define superimposition in slightly different ways. Some say it involves the nongrasping of the distinction of two things leading to one being superimposed on the other. Others say it is the attribution to a thing of properties contrary to those belonging to that thing. In any case all agree that it involves the appearance of the properties of one thing in another. And this agrees with ordinary experience as reflected in the reports of illusions such as "the shell appears as silver" or "the single moon appears double."
