= Dhyanabindu Upanishad =

Sanskrit text, Yoga Upanishad

Dhyanabindu
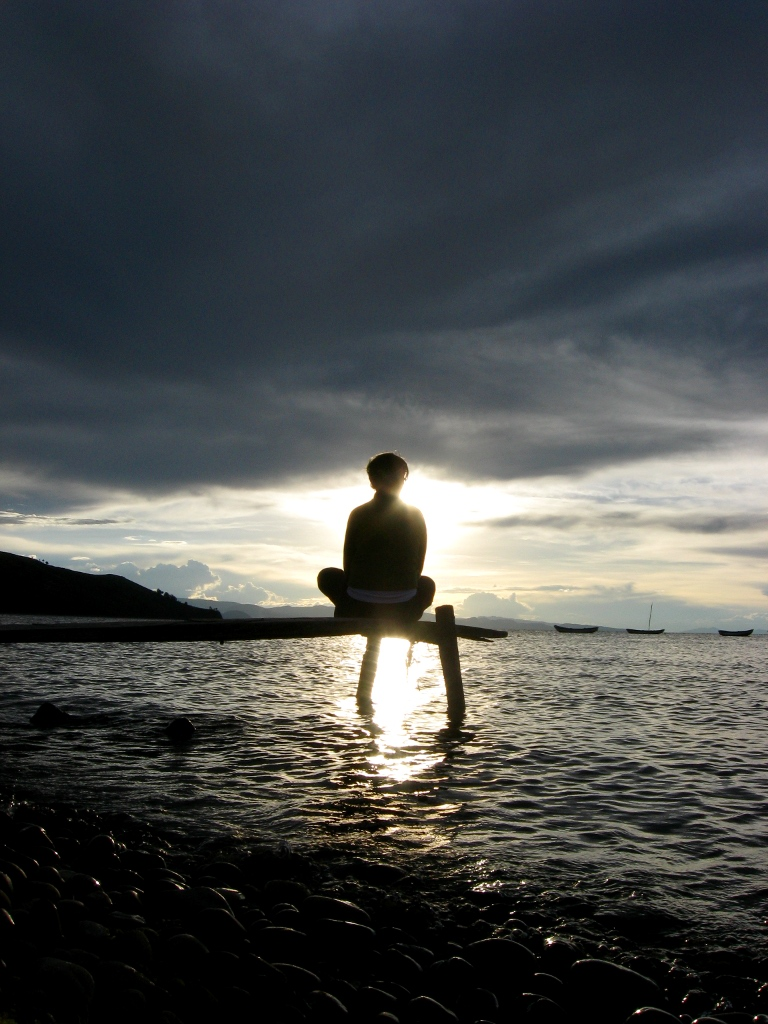
- The Upanishad discusses meditation on the abundance within
- Devanagari: ध्यानबिन्दू
- IAST: Dhyānabindu
- Title means: The point of meditation
- Date: ~100 BCE to 300 CE
- Type: Yoga
- Linked Veda: Samaveda or Atharvaveda
- Chapters: 1
- Verses: varies by manuscript (~23 or 106)

The Dhyanabindu Upanishad (Sanskrit: ध्यानबिन्दू उपनिषत्, IAST: Dhyānabindu Upaniṣad) is an ancient Sanskrit text and a minor Upanishad of Hinduism. It is one of twenty Yoga Upanishads in the four Vedas.

The manuscripts of this Upanishad exist in two versions. The short version has 23 verses and is attached to the Atharvaveda, while the longer version has 106 verses and is attached to the Samaveda. The text is also called Dhyāna-bindūpanishad.

The Upanishad discusses meditation in Yoga. It states that silence during meditation is a reminder of the infinite subtlety therein. It asserts there is an Atman (soul) in every living being, and that a Yogi must seek to understand both the part as well as the whole of everything. The longer version includes techniques for six-staged Yoga.

== History ==
The Dhyanabindu Upanishad is of ancient origins, states Mircea Eliade, who places its relative chronology to the same period when the following Hindu texts were composed – Maitri Upanishad, the didactic parts of the Mahabharata, the chief Sannyasa Upanishads and along with other early Yoga Upanishads such as Brahmabindu, Brahmavidya, Tejobindu, Yogatattva, Nadabindu, Yogashikha, Kshurika and Amritabindu. The Dhyanabindu Upanishad and Yogatattva Upanishad include similar verses, in same sequence, but with some differences, which states Paul Deussen is likely because both these texts were derived from an older common source in India's Yoga tradition.

Gavin Flood dates this text, along with other Yoga Upanishads, to be probably from the 100 BCE to 300 CE period. The longer version, found in South India, is probably one that was expanded, with additions to the text through the 2nd millennium CE because it shares verses with Gorakhnath's Vivekamārtaṇḍa, Gitasara, Hatha Yoga Pradipika and other Hatha yoga texts.

It is listed at number 39 in the serial order of the Muktika enumerated by Rama to Hanuman in the modern era anthology of 108 Upanishads. In the collection of Hindu Upanishads under the title Oupanekhat, compiled by Sultan Mohammed Dara Shikhoh in 1656, consisting of a Persian translation of 50 Upanishads and who prefaced it as the best book on religion, the Dhyanabindu is listed at number 33 and is named Dehlan band. In the Colebrooke's version of 52 Upanishads, popular in north India, the Upanishad's text is at number 20. The Narayana anthology, popular in south India, also includes this Upanishad at number 20 in Bibliothica Indica.

== Contents ==
The text is composed in poetic verse style, and uses metaphors.

It opens by declaring Vishnu as a great Yogin. The Upanishad describes silence as "the highest place"; it states that there is a soul in every living being just like there is fragrance in flowers, oil in oil-seeds and butter in milk; and that a Yogi must seek to understand the tree branch and the tree, the part as well as the whole of everything.

Atman in all beings

As fragrance is in flower,
As butter is in milk,
As oil is in oil-seeds,
As gold is in ore.

As the thread is in pearls,
So firm in Atman (soul) are all beings,
Therefore the knower of Brahman, with mind,
Firm on Brahman, stands unconfused.

—Dhyanabindu Upanishad 7–8

The Upanishad asserts that Om is a means to meditation, to understanding Atman and the Brahman (ultimate reality). The Om is the bow, the soul is the arrow, the Brahman the target of the arrow, asserts verse 19 of the text, metaphorically. Om should be meditated upon as eternal, infinite energy to see the God within, states the text, or for those addicted to God with form, Om should be meditated as Lord Shiva representing the light within the heart (Atman).

The longer version of the Dhyanabindu manuscript that has survived into modern era, includes a six-staged Yoga method quite different from Patanjali's eight-staged practice described in the Yogasutras. The six fold yoga of Dhyanabindu includes Asana (posture), focus on breath and controlling its pace, withdrawing breath, steadiness of breath, Dhyana (meditation) and Dharana (concentration). The text mentions four chief postures for yoga – Siddhasana, Bhadrasana, Simhasana and Padmasana. The right knower of Yoga, states the text, is aware of his or her body, the Linga and Yoni, adoring Kama. The longer version of Dhyanabindu includes a discussion of Kundalini yoga, asserting that the harmonious union of the masculine Shiva and feminine Shakti is one of the goals of Yoga.

The text is notable for its references to and the fragments it poetically integrates from hymns of the Rigveda and other ancient Upanishads such as the Mundaka, Katha and Yogatattva Upanishads.

== See also ==
- Hatha yoga
- Tejobindu Upanishad
- Yoga (philosophy)
- Yogatattva Upanishad
- Yoga Vasistha
