= Pashupatabrahma Upanishad =

Sanskrit text, linked to Atharva Veda

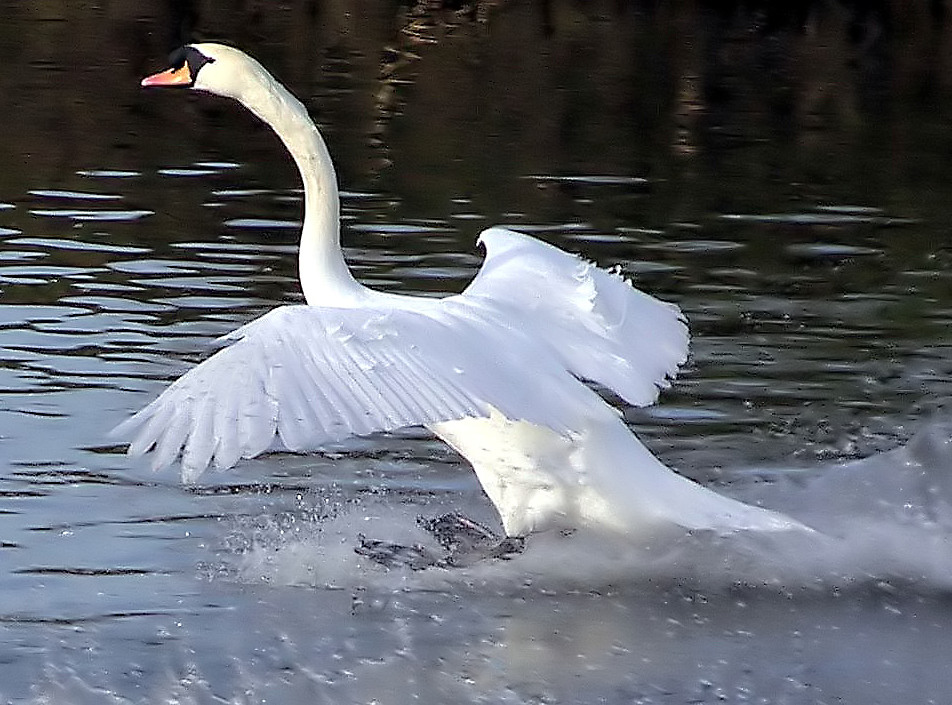
- Soul is a Hamsa, it migrates states the text.
- Devanagari: पाशुपतब्रह्मोपनिषत्
- IAST: Pāśupatabrahmā
- Title means: Creator lord of all animals
- Type: Yoga
- Linked Veda: Atharvaveda
- Chapters: 2, Purva and Uttara
- Verses: 78
- Philosophy: Yoga, Vedanta

The Pashupatabrahma Upanishad (पाशुपतिब्रह्म उपनिषत्), also called Pasupathabrahmopanishad, is a minor Upanishadic text written in Sanskrit. It is one of the 31 Upanishads attached to the Atharvaveda, and is classified as one of the 20 Yoga Upanishads.

In the Telugu language anthology of 108 Upanishads of the Muktika canon, narrated by Rama to Hanuman, it is listed by Paul Deussen – a German Indologist and professor of philosophy, at number 77. The text is a relatively later era Upanishad.

The text is structured in two khanda (sections). The opening verses are in the form of questions addressed to Hindu creator god Brahma by his son Vaishravana. The text discusses soul as Hamsa, yoga, meditation, the uselessness of external rituals and the need for inner reflection with the help of Om, and how a man of true wisdom should behave.

The Upanishad repeatedly uses Hamsa for its concepts. The text asserts that the supreme soul (Brahman) is of the nature of Hamsa, it migrates. Om, states the text, is the true sacred thread, and that there is no difference between Om and the Atman (soul). In AUM, asserts the text, "A" represents the past, "U" represents the present, "M" represents the future. The realization of "hamsa-so'ham" (I am he, he is I), is equivalent to completing all yajna, and this realization destroys "anger, self deception, hatred, infatuation" states the Upanishad.

In verses 19 to 22 of Purva-khanda, the Pashupatabrahma Upanishad asserts that the Hamsa, the Paramataman, is the internal sun that radiates within, and one in quest of Brahman must meditate within, through Pranava (Om) and the knowledge that the Brahman is within oneself. One must abandon all external ritual sacrifices and worship, instead meditate within, asserts the text in verses 27–30. The Dharma-yoga that leads to freedom and liberation is non-violence against others, states the Upanishad. One's soul is the conductor, Pashupati is the Paramatman within.

The Vidya (knowledge) of all the worlds,
is the Alphabet.

—Pashupatabrahma Upanishad 1.3,

The second section (Uttara-khanda) of the text discusses yoga and meditation, asserting the goal of yoga is inner liberation, the realization that the Brahman is within oneself. The Upanishad is notable for asserting in verses 32–33 that the Highest Truth is within one's own body.

The knowledge of Atman, asserts the text, comes to the Jivanmukta through his own efforts and on his own accord. Once he reaches this state, he sees everyone as himself, he sees no Ashramas, no Varnas (social classes), no good, no evil, no prohibitions, no mandates. He lives by his own accord, he is the liberated, and he is the one free from distinguishing and discriminating others. He is beyond the appearance, he is beyond the self, he is one with Brahman.

The text is also notable for asserting that the one who knows his inner soul and thus the Brahman, there is nothing whatever that is prohibited as food, because the entire universe is just food for each other, and everything is he himself in various manifestations of Brahman. The liberated person knows, "I am the food always, I am the eater of the food" too. And yet, the liberated person moderates, caring for everything, seeing the world of his perception always, translates Ayyangar, but never in any way apart from his own soul.

The Upanishad presents the Advaita Vedanta doctrines.
