= Varaha Upanishad =

Hindu text on Yoga

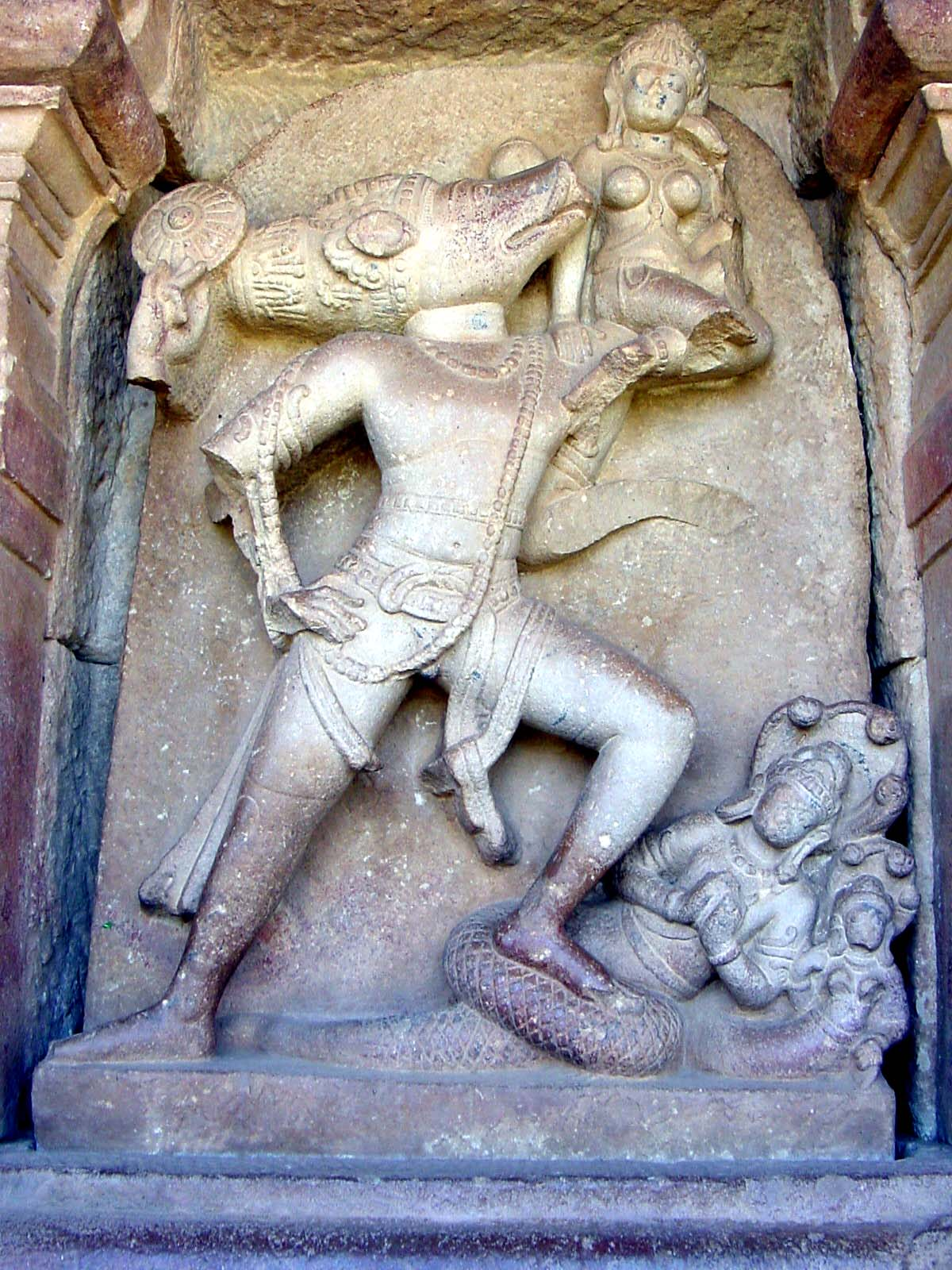
- A sculpture in Durga temple in Aihole depicts Vishnu in a boar (Varaha) avatar rescues Bhudevi (earth)
- Devanagari: वराह
- Title means: Boar
- Date: c. 13th–16th century CE
- Author(s): Ribhu and Vishnu
- Type: Yoga
- Linked Veda: Krishna Yajurveda
- Chapters: 5
- Verses: 247
- Philosophy: Vaishnavism, Yoga

Varaha Upanishad (Sanskrit: वराह उपनिषद्, "boar") is a minor Upanishad of Hinduism composed between the 13th and 16th centuries CE. Composed in Sanskrit, it is listed as one of the 32 Krishna Yajurveda Upanishads, and classified as one of 20 Yoga Upanishads.

The text has five chapters, structured primarily as a discussion between Vishnu in his Varaha (boar) avatar and the sage Ribhu. The discussion covers the subjects of Tattvas, the nature and relationship between the individual soul (Self, Atman) and the Ultimate Reality (Brahman), the seven stages of learning, the characteristics of Jivanmukti (inner sense of freedom while living), and the four types of Jivanmuktas (liberated persons). The last chapter of the text is dedicated to Yoga, its goals and methods.

It is, as an Upanishad, a part of the corpus of Vedanta literature that presents the philosophical concepts of Hinduism. The Varaha Upanishad emphasizes that liberation from sorrow and fear requires a human being to know the non-dualistic nature of existence, oneness between Self, Brahman and Vishnu, and the role of Yoga in self-liberation, and lists ten Yamas (virtues) as essential to a liberation of one's soul: nonviolence, satya, asteya, brahmacharya, compassion, rectitude, kshama, non-hypocrisy, mitahara, and shaucha. The text describes the Jivanmukta as one whose inner state, amongst other things, is neither affected by happiness nor by suffering inflicted on him, who does not shrink out of fear from the world, nor the world shrinks from him with fear, and whose sense of calm and inner contentment is free from anger, fear, and joy toward others.

== Etymology and anthology ==
Varaha means boar, specifically referring to the incarnation of Vishnu as a boar in Indian mythology. The term Upanishad means it is knowledge or "hidden doctrine" text that belongs to the corpus of Vedanta literature presenting the philosophical concepts of Hinduism and considered the highest purpose of its scripture, the Vedas. The text is also known as Varahopanishad.

The text is listed as 98th in the modern era anthology that consists of 108 Upanishads. A Sanskrit text, it is considered one of the 32 Upanishads under the Krishna Yajurveda or Black Yajurveda. Classified as a Yoga Upanishad, the author, authenticity, and source of this Hindu text has been in question, and it is a late Upanishad. Varaha Upanishad was not listed in the anthology of known Upanishads published in the 17th century by Dara Shikoh, in the early 19th-century Henry Thomas Colebrooke anthology, or in the Narayana compilations of Upanishads.

== Chronology ==
The text opens by acknowledging Itihasa (Epics, Ramayana and Mahabharata) and other post-Vedic era texts, thus implying that it was composed in the common era. The text incorporates terminology such as Yogi Siddhi, suggesting that, like other Yoga Upanishads, it was composed after Yoga Sutras of Patanjali and other major Yoga texts. The text also incorporates sections on tantra terminology such as Chakra and Nāḍi in its discussion of Laya, Mantra, and Hatha yoga. The minor Yoga Upanishads, according to Antonio Rigopoulos, a professor of Indology at the University Ca 'Foscari of Venice, were recorded in the medieval period of India's Advaita and Yoga-rooted traditions, possibly in the middle of the 2nd millennium CE, but may well represent already established ideas and practices before the epic and medieval period, given that they use concepts and terminology rooted in the 1st millennium BCE Vedic era text, such as pranava, Atman, and Brahman.

According to Ananda, the text was likely composed between the 13th and 16th centuries.

== Contents ==
=== Structure ===
Ribhu, after observing Tapas (penance) for 12 long deva years, is visited by Vishnu in his Varaha avatar; the latter asks Ribhu what boon he would like. Ribhu declines all worldly pleasures, and asks Vishnu to explain "that science of Brahman which treats of thy nature, a knowledge which leads to salvation". From this point on, the Upanishad is structured as a sermon by Varaha to the sage Ribhu. It has five chapters with a total of 247 verses.

=== Tattvas ===
In Chapter 1 of the text, Varaha tells Ribhu first about the science of Tattvas, meaning "principles". The Tattvas are said to be 24, 36, or even 96 by some teachers, which Varaha elaborates.

In the Tattvas, asserts Varaha, are included the five sensory organs, five organs of action, five vital airs essential to a living body ("Vital airs" of Prāṇa, Apāna, Uḍāna, Samāna, and Vyāna), five rudimentary principles of perception, and the faculties of knowledge – Manas (mind) which produces uncertain knowledge, Buddhi (intelligence) which leads to certain knowledge, "Chitta" (emotional consciousness) which produces doubts and fluctuations in knowledge, and "Ahankara" (ego) which produces egoism. These total 24 tattvas, states the text.

Some scholars, asserts Varaha, expand the list of tattvas of a human body to 36, by including the five elements – earth (Prithvi), air (Vayu), water (Ap), ether (Akasha), and fire (Agni); the three bodies – the gross, the subtle and the causal (Karana); three states of consciousness – when awake, when dreaming, and when in dreamless sleep; and one jiva (soul).

Varaha then describes how the list of tattva increases to 96 in verses 1.8 to 1.14. It includes the six stages of changes (Aiyar translates this to "existence, birth, growth, transformation, decay, and destruction"); six maladies or "infirmities" (hunger, thirst, suffering, delusion, age, and death); koshas or six sheaths ("skin, blood, flesh, fat, marrow, and bones"); six adversities or foes of a body ("longing, anger, craving, arrogance, and malice"); three aspects of "jiva" – "Vishva" (world), "Taijasa" (endowed with light), and "Prajna" (insight into nature of reality); three "Guṇas" or qualities, innate psyche ("Sattva, Rajas, and Tamas"); three types of Karmas ("Prarabdha" (past karma now being enjoyed), "Sanchita" (past karma yet to be enjoyed), and "Agamin" (current karma to be enjoyed later)); five actions ("talking, lifting, walking, excreting, and enjoying"); and tattvas of "thought, certainty, egoism, compassion, kindness, anticipation, sympathy, and indifference". To complete its list of 96, the Varaha adds "Dik", or the four quarters, all Vedic deities who are part of the human body, namely "Vayu" (air, ear), Sun (light, eye), "Varuna" (water, tongue), Ashvini Devas (nose), Agni (fire), Indra, Upendra, and Mrityu (death); it includes the moon, the four-faced Brahma, Rudra, Kshetrajna (the conscious knower of the body), and Ishvara.

Vishnu, as Varaha, asserts in verses 1.15 to 1.17, that he is "other than aggregate of these 96 Tattvas", and those who worship him in his Varaha avatar and know these 96 tattvas remove their Ajnana (ignorance), achieve salvation regardless of which order of life they are in, whether they have shaven head, or head full of hair, or maintain a head with only a tuft of hair.

=== Brahmavidya ===
The Varaha, in the 83 verses of Chapter 2, explains to Ribhu how to achieve the most exalted knowledge of Brahmavidya, and then what it is. He tells Ribhu that the four means of this knowledge are to practice conduct of one's Varna (class) and one's Ashrama (stage in life), from ascetic austerity and with the help of a Guru (spiritual teacher). The Varaha then states that the path to Brahmavidya is through the capacity to distinguish between the ephemeral and the eternal, detachment from the material world unto the spiritual world. A sincere longing for spiritual liberation and six virtuous qualities (shama) are essential in order to achieve Brahmavidya, asserts the Upanishad, these being tranquility, self-restraint, doing work without craving for rewards, endurance, faith, and meditation. Varaha states in verse 2.4 that the truly blessed are those who know Brahman and Atman and have thus become one with them.

Ribhu then asks Varaha, "Taking birth as a human, that is also a male and a Brahmana is difficult, a Yogi who has studied the Vedanta but who does not know the form of Vishnu, how can such an ignorant one become liberated?"

Varaha replies in verses 2.7–2.9 that he alone is Supreme Bliss, that apart from the Atman (soul) there exists no Ishvara or phenomenal world. Those who know their Atman (soul) have no notions of Varna (class) or Ashrama (stage in life); they see Atman in all, they become Brahman and reach "Moksha" salvation even without seeking. That which is of the character of Truth, Knowledge, Bliss, and Fullness, states Varaha Upanishad in verse 2.16, stands farthest away from Tamas (darkness, destruction, chaos).

Varaha states that what one aspires to is part of His own "light", which is all-encompassing. As Atman, self effulgent, Varaha states that "Brahma-Jnanis" are those who see nothing but the Brahman, and they are happy and content in the universe despite being subject to sufferings.

अज्ञस्य दुःखौघमयं ज्ञस्यानन्दमयं जगत्
अन्धं भुवनमन्धस्य प्रकाशं तु सुचक्षुषाम्

—Varaha Upanishad 2.22
Translation:

To an ignorant man, the world is filled with misery; while, to a wise man, it is full of bliss,
To a blind man, the world is dark; while, to men of vision, it is bright.

The Varaha Upanishad asserts the non-dualistic premise that Brahman and Atman are one, and those who know this fear nothing, suffer nothing, and possess fortitude. He is I, states Vishnu. "Become that, Ribhu; Thou am I verily", suggests Vishnu. Those high souled ones, who with the firm conviction that "I am the Brahman", are the Jivanmukta, states verse 2.43 of the text.

==== Sankalpa ====
According to the Upanishad, the entire universe evolves by Sankalpa (a thinking, ideation process), one becomes what one thinks, metaphysics affects physics, and it is ideation that helps retain the appearances of the world. Following renunciation from this universe, which is also called a Sankalpa, the meditating mind is to be focused on the Nirvikalpa (the unchangeable) or the unchangeable part (metaphysical reality). Varaha in verse 2.64 compares the "samsara" (cycle of rebirth) to the domain of karma, states Billington, one that is like a long dream ("swapna"), a delusion, a sea of sorrow. It defines jivanmukta as someone who has overcome and attained liberation from this samsara through self-knowledge.

==== Meditation ====
Varaha explains that through obeisance to Him who is found in everything, and doing meditation for just 48 minutes (a muhurtha), will expand his wisdom to the state of "Pratyagatman", the state of Atman which is forever liberated. It means living close to Jivatma (soul) and Paramatman (the Supreme Soul).

The Upanishad states that knowledge of Brahman results in knowing spiritual truth in the Paroksha (indirect cognition) way, but Sakshatkara (direct realization) results in knowing that his own soul is Brahman. And when a practitioner of Yoga becomes a Jivamukta (liberated soul), he knows that his Atman is the ultimate perfection. To an enlightened person who has realized Brahman, the two words "bondage" and "moksha" mean "mine" and "not mine". "Mine" is linked to a person, but "not mine" relates to one who is liberated from all thinking and knows Atman.

==== Samadhi ====
In verses 2.75 through 2.87, the Varaha Upanishad defines the goal of Yoga and what is "Samadhi", as follows:

The Oneness of the Atman and the mind is attained through Yoga,
This Oneness is said to be what is Samadhi.

— Varaha Upanishad, 2.75

The state of Samadhi, it explains, is akin to salt dissolving in water, and the quality of oneness that results.

=== Vishnu is Shiva ===
The Upanishad, in Chapter 3, continues the sermon of Vishnu to Ribhu, that "Ribhu should develop the conviction that he himself is palpable Existence and Consciousness, indivisible, without a counterpart, devoid of all visibility, non-ailing, flawless, the Shiva without a double". The text reasserts its non-dualism in Chapter 3, adding that bhakti to Vishnu is the path to liberating knowledge of Brahman. In verse 3.14–3.15, states Ayyangar, everyone is equal in the eyes of god, there is no difference between living forms and human beings based on law, family, caste, or clan, and everyone is one Truth and Absolute Brahman. The "Vishnu is Shiva" and "all is Shiva" theme repeats in verse 4.32, which declares, "The Guru is Shiva, the Veda is Shiva, the Deva is Shiva, the Lord is Shiva, I Varaha am Shiva, all is Shiva, other than Shiva there is naught".

The Ultimate Truth, states the text, is that which always is, which preserves its nature over time, and which is unaffected by anything. The Atman, the Brahman, the "Chit, Sat and Ananda", and Janardhana (Vishnu) is such Truth, and they are synonymous, one. Some try to seek Sidhis, asserts the Upanishad, through mantras, religious rituals, time, skill, medicine, or wealth, but such Sidhis are fleeting and fruitless. Be an Atmajnani (one with Self-knowledge) through Yoga, says Vishnu to Ribhu, and to such a person Siddhis are of no importance.

=== Seven stages of knowledge ===
The Varaha Upanishad, in Chapter 4, states that individuals gain knowledge through seven stages: First, one must have virtuous desire to learn, discover (Śubha-iccha). The second stage is inquiry, investigation (Vicāraṇa). Discernment and thinning of mind toward other objects (Tanu-mānasi) is the third stage, states the text. The fourth stage is harmony, creative union with the subject of knowledge (Sattva-patti). Detachment from everything else (Asamsakti) is the fifth stage. Conceptual analysis and gaining complete, correct meaning of the topic (Pada-artha-bhavana) is the sixth stage. The seventh or last stage is Turiya (or Turīyagā), complete consciousness.

The text states that AUM is a means for meditating on the nature of Atman and Brahman, wherein "A" represents Akara and Visva, "U" represents Ukara and Taijasa, M represents Makara and Prajna, the Ardhamatra that follows AUM, represents the Turiya.

==== The characteristics of a Jivanmukta ====
The Varaha Upanishad, in a manner similar to many ancient and medieval era Hindu texts, discusses moksha in this life (rather than afterlife), or Jivanmukti, calling those who have reached such a state a Jivanmukta (self-realized person). The verses 4.21–4.30 describe the characteristics of a Jivanmukta; Ayyangar and Aiyar state as follows:

- He who is engrossed in the ways of the world, yet his mind is steady, like ether, is said to be Jivanmukta
- He whose mental radiance neither rises nor sets, whose inner state is neither affected by happiness nor by misery inflicted on him, is said to be Jivanmukta
- He who is wakeful while remaining asleep, he whose mental alertness is devoid of impressions, is known as Jivanmukta
- He who responds to influences such as hatred, fear, love, yet his heart remains pure like Akasha (aether, space), is said to be Jivanmukta
- He whose attitude is not be attached to anything, his intellect never clouded whether active or passive, is a Jivanmukta
- He who does not shrink out of fear from the world, nor the world shrinks from him, who is free from anger, fear and joy, is a Jivanmukta
- He whose mind is not agitated, though participating in the world, who rests in state of calmness and absolute consciousness, no matter what, is known as Jivanmukta

The concept and characteristics of Jivanmukta in Varaha Upanishad is similar, states Sprockhoff, but other Upanishads develop these ideas further and in greater depth.

=== Yoga ===
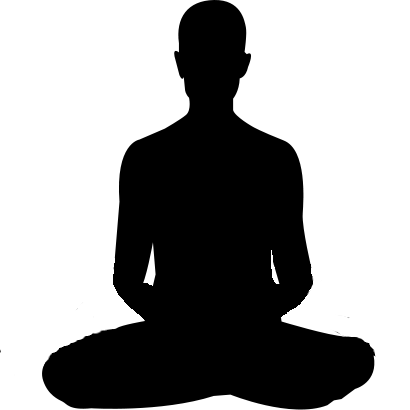
The fifth chapter of Varaha Upanishad discusses meditation and Yoga.

Chapter 5 of the Varaha Upanishad is dedicated to Yoga, as a discussion between Ribhu and his student Nidagha. There are three types of Yoga, states the text, and these are Laya (soft), Mantra (mystic), and Hatha (middle), recommending Hatha Yoga as foremost of three. It discusses various aspects of Yoga, ranging from recommending that healthy food should be eaten in temperate quantities, in small portions, several times a day, to recommending that Yoga should not be performed when one is not feeling well or is very hungry. The goal of Yoga, states Varaha, is manifold, including the gain of body strength and suppleness, acquisition of knowledge of one's own body and its auras, meditation, and Self (soul) knowledge.

==== Axiology: Yamas and Niyamas ====
The axiology in the Varaha Upanishad is presented in Chapter 5 as ten Yamas and ten Niyamas. This list is similar to the list found in other Yoga texts such as the Shandilya Upanishad, as well as by Svātmārāma:

1. Ahiṃsā (अहिंसा): nonviolence
2. Satya (सत्य): truthfulness
3. Asteya (अस्तेय): not stealing
4. Brahmacharya (ब्रह्मचर्य): celibacy when single, not cheating on one's partner
5. Kṣamā (क्षमा): forgiveness
6. Dhṛti (धृति): fortitude
7. Dayā (दया): compassion
8. Ārjava (आर्जव): non-hypocrisy, sincerity
9. Mitāhāra (मितहार): measured diet
10. Śauca (शौच): purity, cleanliness

The Varaha Upanishad along with the Shandilya, suggests ten niyamas in the sense of positive duties, desirable behaviors, and discipline. The Varaha's axiological list in Chapter 5 for observances include:

1. Tapas: persistence, perseverance in one's purpose, penance austerity
2. Santoṣa: contentment, acceptance of others and of one's circumstances as they are, joy
3. Āstika: faith in Real Self (jnana yoga, raja yoga), belief in God (bhakti yoga), conviction in Vedas/Upanishads (orthodox school)
4. Dāna: generosity, charity, sharing with others
5. Īśvarapūjana: worship of the Ishvara (God/Supreme Being, Brahman, True Self, Unchanging Reality)
6. Siddhānta śrāvaṇa: listening to the ancient scriptures, texts about ethics, values, and principles
7. Hrī: remorse and acceptance of one's past, modesty, humility
8. Mati: think and reflect to understand, reconcile conflicting ideas
9. Japa: mantra repetition, reciting prayers or knowledge
10. Vrata: keeping promises, fast rituals, observing pilgrimage and yajna

==== Yogasanas ====
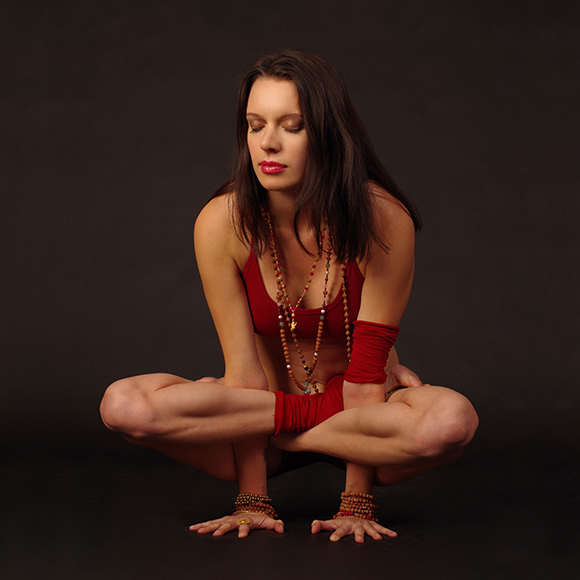
Kukkutasana (Rooster pose) is mentioned in the text.

The Upanishad makes mention of eleven asanas (Yogic postures), of which two pertain to physiological postures: Mayurasana and Kukkutasana. It describes squatting with folded legs known as Sukhasana, a meditative pose.

Varaha gives a simile of an artist practicing dance to an orchestra, balancing a vessel on her head. She is focused only on the stability of the pot, in the same manner a practitioner of Yoga always contemplates on the Brahman. The yogic practice should be centered on the "spiritual sound" only. Immersion and self-absorption in music is a form of yoga. Varaha encourages introspection, and states that a person discerning his own mistakes will be free of attachments in life.

==== Kundalini ====
Varaha emphatically states that Kundalini or corporeal energy is the ultimate power of truth. It is further states that prana, the life force, exists in the Nadis (channels, pipes or tubes), which run in the body, emanating from the sole of the foot and running to the skull of the head. The six Chakras beginning with Muladhara are said to be the seat of Shakti. From the neck to the top of the head is said to be the seat of Shambu.

== Bibliography ==
- Ananda, Sri G. (15 February 2014). Chakras: A Gentle Awakening. Art of Unity. ISBN 978-1-4959-4616-5.
- Billington, Ray (4 January 2002). Understanding Eastern Philosophy. Routledge. ISBN 978-1-134-79348-8.
- Gajendragadkar, K. V. (1959). Neo-upanishadic Philosophy. Bharatiya Vidya Bhavan.
- Johari, Harish (1 September 2000). Chakras: Energy Centers of Transformation. Inner Traditions / Bear & Co. ISBN 978-1-59477-909-1.
- Prasoon, S.K. (2008). Indian Scriptures. Pustak Mahal. ISBN 978-81-223-1007-8.
- Ramamoorthy, Dr. H.; Nome (2000). The Song of Ribhu: The English Translation of the Tamil Ribhu Gita. Society of Abidance in Truth. ISBN 978-0-9703667-0-2.
- Ros, Frank (1 December 2001). The Lost Secrets of Ayurvedic Acupuncture: An Ayurvedic Guide to Acupuncture. Motilal Banarsidass Publishers. ISBN 978-81-208-1295-6.
- Rosen, Richard (May 2012). Original Yoga Rediscovering Traditional Practices of Hatha Yoga. Shambhala Publications. ISBN 978-0-8348-2740-0.
- Sathianathan, Shantsheela (1996). Contributions of saints and seers to the music of India. Kanishka Publishers, Distributors. ISBN 978-81-7391-109-5.
- Śrīnivāsabhaṭṭa (1982). Haṭharatnāvalī. M. Ramakrishna Reddy.
- Tinoco, Carlos Alberto (1997). Upanishads. IBRASA. ISBN 978-85-348-0040-2.
