= Brahmavidya =

Branch of knowledge in Hinduism

Brahmavidya (Sanskrit: ब्रह्मविद्या, romanized: Brahmavidyā, lit. 'knowledge of the Ultimate Reality') is a branch of Hindu scriptural knowledge derived primarily through a study of the Upanishads, the Brahma Sūtras, and the Bhagavad Gita.

In the Puranas, this is divided into two branches, the first one dealing with the Vedic mantras and is called para-vidya or 'former knowledge', and the latter dealing with the study of the Upanishads and is called the apara-vidya or 'latter knowledge'. Both para- and apara-vidya constitute brahma-vidya. The Mundaka Upanishad says that "Brahma-vidya sarva-vidya pratistha", which means "The Knowledge of Brahman is the foundation of all knowledge."

== Etymology ==
The term brahmavidya is a compound derived from the Sanskrit terms brahman and vidya.

Brahman is the Ultimate Reality in Hinduism.

The word vidyā means "knowledge," and is derived from the Sanskrit verbal root -vid- ("to know"), also seen in the word Veda. Its cognates in other Indo-European languages are the Greek εἶδον for ἐϝιδον ("I saw"), οἶδα for ϝοιδα ("I know"), Latin vidēre ("to see"), Slavic věděti, Gothic ("witan, wait"), Germanic wizzan, wissen ("to know"), and the English ("wisdom, wit").

== Mythology ==
The Shatapatha Brahmana features a legend in which the sage Atharvan was threatened decapitation by Indra if he restored the head of a sacrificial offering, since it would lead to the revelation of esoteric knowledge. The Ashvin twins, eager to acquire this wisdom, promised to replace the head of Atharvan with that of a horse while keeping the real one in safekeeping, after which the head could be restored. Atharvan agreed, restoring the head of the sacrifice, and the knowledge was revealed from the horse-head. When Indra duly carried out this decapitation after the revelation, the Ashvins promptly restored the real head of the sage. The knowledge revealed came to be known as the Brahmavidya.

In the Mundaka Upanishad, Brahma is stated to have revealed the Brahmavidya to his eldest son Atharvan, who passed it down to Angiras, who in turn passed it down to Bharadvaja.

Yama is described to have imparted the knowledge of Brahmavidya to Nachiketa.

== Current usage ==
In modern Hinduism, Brahmavidya is used to mean a spiritual study of Hindu scriptures with the aim of realising the Ultimate Reality. Usually it is used for the Advaitavāda and Śrī Vidyā.
