= Yoga-kundalini Upanishad =

Sanskrit text, Yoga Upanishad

- Yoga-Kundalini Upanishad is a yoga text
- Devanagari: योगकुण्डलिनी
- Type: Yoga
- Linked Veda: Krishna Yajurveda
- Chapters: 3
- Verses: 171

The Yoga-kundalini Upanishad (Sanskrit: योगकुण्डलिनी उपनिषत् IAST: Yogakuṇḍalini Upaniṣad), also called Yogakundali Upanishad (Sanskrit: योगकुण्डल्युपनिषत्, IAST: Yogakuṇḍalī Upaniṣad), is a minor Upanishad of Hinduism. The Sanskrit text is one of the 20 Yoga Upanishads and is one of 32 Upanishads attached to the Krishna Yajurveda. In the Muktika canon, narrated by Rama to Hanuman, it is listed at number 86 in the anthology of 108 Upanishads.

It is a highly significant text related to the exposition of the Kundalini Yoga, describing Hatha and Lambika yoga; the last chapter is primarily about the quest of self-knowledge, Atman, Brahman (the Non-dual Brahman) and living liberation. It is an important text in Tantra, the Shakti tradition of Hinduism, and is considered one of the most important texts on Kundalini Yoga.

According to the Yoga-Kundalini Upanishad, "even as fire in logs of wood will not rise without churning, so also without the practice of Yoga, the light of knowledge cannot be lit". Chitta, or mind, is explained in the text as a source for Samskaras and Vasanas (behavioural tendencies), as well as an effect of Prana. Yoga techniques to become aware of and to control Prana are elaborated in the Upanishad. These techniques include Mitahara (moderate, balanced nutrition), Asana (posture exercises), and shakti-chalana (awakening inner force) are asserted to be the means to arousing a yogin's Kundalini.

== Etymology ==
Yoga (from the root yuj) means "to add", "to join", "to unite", or "to attach" in its most common literal sense. According to Dasgupta, the term yoga can be derived from either of two roots, yujir yoga (to yoke) or yuj samādhau (to concentrate).

Kundalini, states James Lochtefeld, refers to "the latent spiritual power that exists in every person". It is a fundamental concept in tantra, and symbolizes an aspect of Shakti that is typically dormant in every person, and its awakening is a goal in tantra. The root of the word is kundala (coiled rope). The title "Yoga-kundalini Upanishad" literally means "the secret doctrine of Kundalini yoga".

== Chronology ==
The Yoga-Kundalini Upanishad is a common era text, composed sometime after Yogasutras. Banerjea states that the Yoga-Kundalini text, like many late Yoga Upanishads, deals with yogic concepts and methods taught by Siddha Yogi teachers such as Gorakhnath, an 11th-century yogi.

== Structure ==
The text is set in verse, structured into three chapters, with a total of 171 verses. The first chapter has 87 verses, and discusses yoga practice. The second chapter with 49 verses discusses Khecari (Sanskrit: खेचरि) knowledge. The last chapter consists of 35 verses and discusses soul, Brahman, meditation and living liberation.

The contents of Yoga-Kundalini Upanishad were influenced by Hatha yoga and Mantra yoga, with the first two chapters structured in verses of Kundalini tantra, the third chapter structured in a chant genre (Mantra yoga).

== Contents ==
=== Chapter 1: The practice ===
The first chapter opens with the statement that the human mind is influenced by memories and Prana (vital breath, inner life-force). First and foremost, states the text, a yogin should begin by mastering Prana. The verse 1,2 of the Upanishad asserts that this can be achieved by Mitahara, Asana and "rousing of inner power (Kundalini)" (Shakti-chalan).

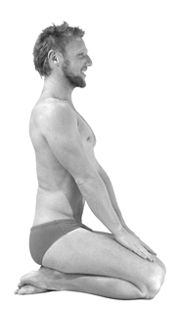
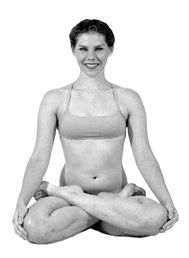
Vajrasana (left) and Padmasana (right) are two postures recommended for practice in Yoga-kundalini.

Mitahara (Sanskrit: मिताहार, Mitāhāra) means moderation in food (light, sweet and nutritious food), and in the Yoga tradition, it is the concept of integrated awareness about food, drink, balanced diet and consumption habits and its effect on one's body and mind. It is one of the ten Yamas in ancient Indian texts. Mitahara is neither eating too much nor eating too little quantity of food, and self-restraint from either eating too much or too little of certain qualities of food. Verse 1.3 and 1.4 of the Yoga-kundalini Upanishad state that one must eat nourishing and sapient food.

The Upanishad in verses 1.4 to 1.6 describes Asanas (postures) as a part of practice for the yogi and yogini. Asana (Sanskrit: आसन) means "to sit down". The text lists just two asanas in these verses – Padmasana (lotus posture) and Vajrasana (diamond or kneeling posture).

Verses 1.7 to 1.18 of the text summarize the practice of Kundalini-arousing. The two steps include Arousing the Saraswati Nadi, and breath control (Pranayama and Kumbhaka).; the Kumbhakas cause total restraint of the Prana. The text in verses 1.18–1.39 details the breath control practice in several ways including Surya-Kumbhaka, Ujjayi-Kumbhaka, Sitali-Kumbhaka and Bhastra-Kumbhaka. Three types of Bandha are summarized in verses 1.40 to 1.53 – Mula Bandha, Uddiyana bandha and Jalandhara Bandha. The text states that the Kumbhaka and Bandha practice arouses various Nadi (blood vessels through which subtle and causal energies flow).

==== Obstacles ====
The Yogakundali Upanishad, in verses 1.54 to 1.66 recommends the progress steps and number of times yoga should be attempted, and obstacles to one's progress. In verses 1.56–1.61, it states that those who are ill or injured should not do this yoga, and those who are suffering from excretory obstructions should refrain as well. The text lists as obstacles to progress in a yogin as following: self doubts, confusion, indifference, abnormal sleep, habit of giving up, delusions, being caught up in worldly drama, failure to comprehend descriptions, suspicions regarding the truth of yoga.

==== Chakras ====
The Yoga-kundalini Upanishad mentions six chakras.

The verses 1.65 to 1.76 describe the process of progress and experience, with the text stating that the Chakra with sixteen petals called Anahata is awakened, linking vital fluids of the human body symbolically to moon and sun, that is arousing the awareness of cold and hot essence within respectively. The text lists six chakras as the Ajna is in the head (between the two eyebrows), Vishuddhi (root of the neck), Anahata (heart), Manipuraka (navel), Svadhishthana (near genital organ) and Muladhara (base of spinal cord). These, states the text, are centers of Shakti (power, energy, subtle force).

==== Goal ====
The Yogakundali Upanishad, in verses 1.77 to 1.87, outlines the destination for the journey of Kundali-yoga practice to be the knowledge of Brahman (eternal, changeless reality), Atman (soul, self), and inner liberation. In verses 1.77 to 1.81, it cautions the yogin against having "absurd and impossible notions" such as rope serpent, delusions such as men and women expecting "silver in the shell of the pearl oyster" through yoga. The text states that the goal is for the yogin as:

पिण्डब्रह्माण्डयोरैक्यं लिङ्गसूत्रात्मनोरपि । स्वापाव्याकृतयोरैक्यं स्वप्रकाशचिदात्मनोः ॥

Realize the oneness of the Visva-atman (cosmic soul) through Turiya (pure consciousness within) of the microcosm of body, with the Virad-atman (great soul) through the Turiya of the macrocosm. Realize the Linga with the Sutraman, of Sleep with the unmanifested state, self illumination of the Atman manifested in one's self with the Atman of consciousness.

— Yoga-kundalini Upanishad 1.81,

Inner self-awareness, from the body in lotus Asana, in a mind absorbed in the Kumbhaka, state the last verses of the first chapter, breaks through inner knots of Brahma, Vishnu and Rudra, then through six lotuses, unleashing the Kundalini Shakti in the thousand petalled lotus, delighting in the company of Shiva. It is then, asserts the text, that the yogin pierces through the phenomenal world of differences and reaches oneness, the cause of the manifestation of bliss.

=== Chapter 2: The Khecari Vidya ===
The Chapter 2 opens with a praise and wonders of Khechari knowledge, with the assertion that "one who has mastered this, is devoid of aging and mortality" and free from the suffering from diseases. The word Khechari means "transversing the ethereal regions", and the text dedicates first 16 verses of the chapter stating how difficult it is, how wonderful and miraculous it is, how even experts fail in it, how secret this knowledge is, how even a hundred rebirths are insufficient for mastering Khechari-Vidya. But those who do, attain the state of Shiva, claims the text, and they are liberated from all attachments to the world.

The verses 2.17 to 2.20 use a cryptic code to explain how to extract Khechari-Vidya bija (seed). These are then constituted into a Khechari-mantra in verse 2.20, as "Hrīṃ, Bham, Saṃ, Shaṃ, Phaṃ, Saṃ and Kshaṃ". The text, in verses 2.21–2.27 returns to praising the mantra, and then describes that the muttering the mantra and a variety of austere khechari-yoga practices over twelve years in verses 2.28 to 2.49. Success would be achieved, states the text in the closing verses of chapter 2, when the yogin sees in his body, the entire universe.

=== Chapter 3: The Jivanmukta ===
The third chapter of the Upanishad discusses the state of Samadhi and that is Jivanmukta (living liberation). It defines Samadhi as that state of Atman and pure consciousness in which "all is known as one" and the existence in the nectar of oneness. The verses 3.1 to 3.11 assert, translates Ayyangar, that this state is "assuming the attitude of I am the Brahman and giving up that also", eliminating all bondages of the mind, and awakening the Ishvara (god) within, through one's energized Kundalini and the six Chakras.

This state is one of entering bliss, asserts the Upanishad. According to verses 3.14 to 3.16, Yoga is essential for the light of knowledge to be lit, and the Atman (soul) is the lamp inside one's body. The precepts and guidance of a Guru (teacher) is essential for mastering Kundalini yoga and to cross the ocean of worldly existence, state verses 3.17 to 3.18. Right knowledge leads to an existence of a tranquil and sublime state, where there is neither darkness nor radiance, it is indescribable asserts the Yogakundali Upanishad.

A Yogin, deluded by Maya and exhausted, states the text in verses 3.25 to 3.32, questions "Who am I? How has the worldly existence been brought about? Where do I go when I sleep? Who functions when I am awake? Who functions when I dream in sleep?" This is a knowledge lost over one's rebirths. Meditation and Kundalini yoga helps one to realize the answers within, lit a light that shines within, reach the saintly state of Jivanmukta, who remains in eternal Brahman alone, states the Upanishad.

== See also ==
- Kundalini yoga
- Yoga (philosophy)
- Yoga Vasistha
- Yogatattva Upanishad
- Yogi

== Bibliography ==
- Deussen, Paul; Bedekar, V.M.; Palsule, G.B. (1997). Sixty Upanishads of the Veda, Volume II. Motilal Banarsidass. ISBN 978-81-208-1467-7.
- Ayyangar, TR Srinivasa (1938). The Yoga Upanishads. The Adyar Library.
- Warnick, LaTeef Terrell (23 April 2015). Kundalini Yoga: The Shakti Path to Soul Awakening. 1 S.O.U.L. Publishing. ISBN 978-1-939199-14-0.
