= Gavin Flood =

British scholar of comparative religion (born 1954)

Gavin Flood FBA
- Born: 1954 (age 71–72)
- Spouse: Dr Kwan Kui Leung

Academic work
- Main interests: Religious studies, tantra, comparative religion, Hinduism
- Notable works: Introduction to Hinduism (Cambridge University Press 1996), Beyond Phenomenology: Rethinking the Study of religion (Cassell 1999).

Gavin Dennis Flood (born 1954) is a British scholar of comparative religion specialising in Shaivism and phenomenology, but with research interests that span South Asian traditions. From October 2005 through December 2015, he served in the Faculty of Theology University of Oxford and as the Academic Director of the Oxford Centre for Hindu Studies which is a Recognised Independent Centre of the University of Oxford. In 2008, Flood was granted the title of professor of Hindu studies and comparative religion from the University of Oxford. In 2014, he was elected a Fellow of the British Academy. In 2016, Flood became the inaugural Yap Kim Hao Professor of Comparative Religious Studies at Yale-NUS College in Singapore. He is a senior research fellow at Campion Hall, University of Oxford.

== Published works ==
- "Hinduism". Rites of Passage. A&C Black. 1994. ISBN 978-0-567-31072-9.
- An Introduction to Hinduism. Cambridge: Cambridge University Press. 1996. ISBN 978-0-521-43878-0.
- The Blackwell Companion to Hinduism. Oxford: Blackwell. 2003. ISBN 0-631-21535-2.
- Beyond Phenomenology: Rethinking the Study of Religion. A&C Black. 1999. ISBN 978-0-304-70570-2.
- The Ascetic Self: Subjectivity, Memory and Tradition. Cambridge University Press. 2004. ISBN 978-0-521-60401-7.
- The Tantric Body: The Secret Tradition of Hindu Religion. I.B.Tauris. 2006. ISBN 978-1-84511-012-3.
- The Importance of Religion: Meaning and Action in Our Strange World. John Wiley & Sons. 2012. ISBN 978-1-4051-8972-9.
- The Truth Within: A History of Inwardness in Christianity, Hinduism, and Buddhism. Oxford: OUP. 2013. ISBN 978-0-19-968456-4.
- The Bhagavad Gita: A New Translation. W. W. Norton & Company. 2013. ISBN 978-0-393-34513-1.
- Religion and the Philosophy of Life. Oxford: OUP. 2019. ISBN 978-0-19-257314-8.

== See also ==
- Oxford Centre for Hindu Studies
