= Samkhya Pravachana Sutra =

Hindu sutra

The Samkhya Pravachana Sutra (Sanskrit: सांख्यप्रवचन सूत्र Sāṁkhyapravacanasūtra) is a collection of major Sanskrit texts of the Samkhya school of Hindu philosophy. It includes the ancient Samkhya Sutra of Kapila, Samkhya karika of Ishvarakrishna, Samkhya Sutra Vritti of Aniruddha, the Bhasya (commentary) of Vijnana Bhikshu, the Vrittisara of Vedantin Mahadeva, Tattva Samasa and commentary of Narendra, and works of Gaudapada, Vachaspati Mishra, and Panchashikha.

The text provides foundational doctrines of one of the influential schools of Hindu philosophy, such as "nothing can come out of nothing, and nothing can altogether vanish out of existence" in its doctrine of Sat-Karya-Siddhanta, a debate on the two theories for the origin of the world - the creationists (Abhava Utpatti) and the evolutionists (Vivarta, changing from one state to another), the doctrine of Parinama (transformation), among others.

Samkhya Pravachana Sutra is also known as Samkhya Sutra.

== Contents ==
It describes the philosophy of the Samkhya school. The edition that survives in modern times is dated to the 14th century.

The text consists of six chapters. The first three describe core Samkhya doctrines, the fourth chapter describes stories for illustration of the doctrines, the fifth reviews arguments and challenge by rival Indian philosophies particularly Buddhism on one side and Theistic philosophy on the other side, then provides its analysis and answers to those challenges. The last chapter recapitulates its thesis, summarizes its main points and makes conclusions. Major sections and thesis presented in the text include (not exhaustive):

1. Samkhya is a Moksha Shastra
2. Samkhya is the only true Advaita Shastra
3. Samkhya is not in conflict with the Vedas
4. The Samkhya plurality of Self (soul) versus the Vedanta unity of Self
5. Definition of Supreme Good
6. Thesis on Suffering - what it is, and why it happens
7. Scripture is inadequate means to enlightenment
8. Theory of bondage; Bondage is not natural
9. Theory of Naimittika
10. Purusha and Prakṛti
11. Theory and nature of Prakriti
12. Theory of conjunction
13. Theory of Vidya and Avidya
14. The problem with Sunyavada, Theory of void and its criticism
15. Theory of Aviveka
16. Doctrines of Yoga and Vedanta
17. Theory of learning and reasoning, limits of reason
18. Theory of spiritual intuition
19. Theory of Gunas
20. Twenty five tattvas
21. The enumeration theory of Samkhya and Garbha, Prasna and Maitreya Upanishads
22. Theory of Tanmatras
23. Ahamkara (ego) and its nature
24. Roots of Samkhya: Brihadaranyaka and Chandogya Upanishads
25. Theory of prakriti evolution, objection of logicians
26. The "root cause is rootless" doctrine
27. The chain of causality and the primary causality
28. Why Prakriti, not Purusha, is the material cause
29. The "world is not unreal" doctrine
30. The "why nothing come out of nothing" doctrine
31. The "rituals can never become the cause of moksha" doctrine
32. The "freedom from samsara is not the result of Karma" doctrine
33. The "knowledge leads to release, and this is not perishable" doctrine
34. Theory of "process of knowing" and three kinds of pramana (epistemology)
35. Theory of existent effects, what is existence and what is non-existence
36. The purpose of creation, the cause of successive creation
37. The theory of space and time
38. The theory of manas (mind), sensory organs, cognition, and human nature
39. Sources of knowledge
40. The rebirth doctrine
41. The Jivanmukti doctrine (liberation while alive) and the theory of Viveka
42. Fables
43. Review of opposite theories and objections, the Samkhya answers

The most important commentary on the text is Vijñānabhikṣu's Sāṁkhyapravacanabhāṣya (16th century). Other important commentaries on this text include Anirruddha's Kāpilasāṁkhyapravacanasūtravṛtti (15th century), Mahādeva's Sāṁkhyapravacanasūtravṛttisāra (c. 1600) and Nāgeśa's Laghusāṁkhyasūtravṛtti.
