= Yuktidīpikā =

Commentary on Sāṁkhyakārikā

Yuktidīpikā (Devanagari: युक्तिदीपिका; transl. Light on Argumentation) is a commentary on the Samkhya Karika written in Sanskrit most probably between 600 and 700 CE. It is often regarded as the most detailed polemical commentary on the Karika as it responds to objections coming from Buddhism, Vedanta and Nyaya schools through the lens of Samkhya school of Hindu philosophy.

The text is classified into 4 prākaraṇa and 11 ahnikas.

== Authorship ==
The authorship of Yuktidīpikā is uncertain.

=== Vāchaspati Miśra ===
Some manuscripts mention Vachaspati Mishra (Skt., वाचस्पति मिश्र), although it is questionable for the following reasons:

1. Misra's Sāṃkhyatattvakaumudī does not mention that he has written any such commentary.
2. If he composed it after the Sāṃkhyatattvakaumudī, we don't understand why Misra authored two commentaries on the same.
3. Yuktidīpikā and the Sāṃkhyatattvakaumudī contradict each other on interpretation of Samkhyakarika. Also, the style of both texts is so distinct that it's difficult to imagine that both are written by the same author.

=== Rāja or Rājan ===
Some sources hint towards the name Raja or Rajan who is generally believed to be its original author. Nothing more is known about him though.

== Manuscripts ==
The different editions of manuscripts of the commentary are kept at:

1. Ahmedabad: part of the collection at Lalbhai Dalpatbhai Institute of Indology.
2. Pune: part of Government Manuscript Library at Bhandarkar Oriental Research Institute.
3. Srinagar: with Oriental Research Library, Kashmir University.
4. New Delhi: with National Archives of India and labelled number 64.
5. Varanasi: in the collection of Banaras Hindu University.

== Insights ==
=== Samkhya's opponents ===
Yuktidīpikā regards the non-dualists (puruṣavādin), the theists (īśvaravādin), the atomists (aṇuvādin), the Buddhists (vaināśika i.e., nihilists), the Charvakas (prakṛtivādin i.e., materialists) as well as the immoral people as main opponents of Samkhya.

=== Īśvara (god) ===
In addition to atoms (paramāṇu), consciousness (puruṣa), action (karma), fate (daiva), time (kāla), chance (yadṛcchā), and absence (abhāva), Yuktidīpikā opposes the notion of a creator god as the cause of world. Instead, Īśvara or god is defined as 'pure-consciousness' much like Puruṣa.

The author of the commentary clarifies the idea of Īśvara in response to an opponent who worships Śiva and falsely claims that Sāṃkhya denies Īśvara entirely:

This too is mistaken, since you do not understand our intended meaning. We do not completely reject the particular power of Īśvara, his assuming a majestic body, etc. Our intended meaning is just that there is no being different from Prakṛti (primordial substance) and Puruṣa (pure consciousness) and the instigator of these two, as you claim. Therefore, your view is refuted. The conjunction between Prakṛti and Puruṣa is not instigated by another being.

For the author, Īśvara doesn't exist outside of the dualism of Prakṛti and Puruṣa. Being pure consciousness, Īśvara lacks any permanent material accessories but often assumes them such as a "majestic body" (māhātmyaśarīra) yet remaining untouched by passion, doubt and sees beyond what can be seen through ordinary senses. This notion of Īśvara appears to be consistent with Yogasūtras, another major work in the Samkhya tradition. While never claiming that Īśvara is the creator of the world, Patanjali also describes Īśvara as a "special-Puruṣa, untouched by afflictions".

=== The Vedas ===
The text asserts that the Vedas are authorless but non-eternal. In the commentary on the fifth verse of the Sāṃkhyakārikā, it states that the Vedas are “not preceded by the intellect of a puruṣa” in elucidating Īśvarakṛṣṇa's concept of verbal testimony (āptavacana). It refers to the Vedas being 'independent' (svatantra), “leading to the highest good of a man” and “pramāṇa which cannot be put into doubt”. According to Łucyszyna, this view of the Vedas points to a possible influence of Mīmāṃsā.

Additionally, it recognizes that the Vedas include not only rituals but also the path to knowledge-based liberation in the Upanishads⁣⁣, which is the same as Samkhya teachings.

=== Critique of Buddhism ===
The commentary contains critique of the Buddhist philosophy especially Vasubandhu's works such as Abhidharmakośa, Viṃśatikā, Triṃśikā. Vasubandhu's refutation of the Self (atman) are criticized in the commentary on Samkhya Karika 17 while a long polemic against Vijñānavāda doctrine can be found under commentary on Samkhya karika 37.

=== View of the Self (atman) ===
According to commentary on Karika 17, the Self is "non-composite" and “imperceptible, unlike the composites like (the embodied individual) Devadatta or chariot etc. Puruṣa is not self-manifesting like in Advaita, nor is it subject to introspective or mediating knowledge like in Nyāya. According to it, puruṣa is simply consciousness that is not aware of itself.
