= Shashti Tantra =

Treatise in Indian philosophy

- षष्टितन्त्र

Information
- Religion: Hinduism
- Author: Panchashikha
- Language: Sanskrit
- Sutras: Samkhya Sutras
- Alternate name - Kapiliya-sâstra
- Treatise of Panchashikha in the Samkhya school of Indian philosophy.

Shashti Tantra (Sanskrit: षष्टितन्त्र, Romanised: Ṣaṣṭi-Tantra) is a Sanskrit treatise in the tradition of Shankhya school in the ancient Indian philosophy. It is attributed to the revered Vedic sage Panchashikha. It is an Indian philosophical text, that also provides the knowledge about the origins of the doctrine of Time as the source of all things. The core principle of the text is the relation between Purusha and Prakriti.

The text declare that

"Nature, directed by soul, proceeds"

— Panchashikha, Shashti Tantra

== Etymology ==
Shashti Tantra is a Sanskrit phrase having two terms Shashti and Tantra. The meaning of the first term Shashti is sixty and that of the second term Tantra is manual or treatise or philosophical concept. The literal meaning of the combined terms is "Doctrine of 60 Conceptions".

== Description ==
The Vedic philosophical text Shashti Tantra was founded by the sage Panchashikha. Its doctrine was taught to the King Janadeva Janaka of Mithila by him. Panchashikha was the royal acharya of the King Janadeva Janaka in Mithila. The text contains 60 philosophical concepts of the Samkhya school in the Indian philosophy. Since, Panchashikha is also called as Kapileya, therefore the text Shashti Tantra is also known as Kapiliya-sâstra after his nickname.

According to scholars, the original version of the Shashti Tantra composed by Panchashikha has been lost before Adi Shankaracharya. It is said that the 4th century CE scholar Ishvarakrishna had presented an excellent, concise version of Panchashikha's Shashti Tantra, in his seventy Arya verses. Similarly, the 9th century CE Indian philosopher Vācaspati Miśra from Mithila, must have known some parts of Shashthi Tantra, since he had mentioned its quotes from time to time in his writings.
