= Vivartavada =

Vedantic theory of causation

Vivartavada is an Advaita Vedanta theory of causation, postulated by post-Shankara Advaita advaitins, regarding the universe as an "illusory transformation" of Brahman.

== Etymology ==
The Sanskrit word vivarta (विवर्त) means alteration, modification, change of form, altered condition or state. The term, vivartavada is derived from the word vivarta.

== Meaning ==
All schools of Vedānta subscribe to the theory of Satkāryavāda, (Note: Internet Encyclopedia of Philosophy, Bhedābheda Vedānta) which means that the effect is pre-existent in the cause. But there are different views on the origination of the empirical world from Brahman. Parinamavada is the idea that the world is a real transformation (parinama) of Brahman. Vivartavada is the idea that

the world is merely an unreal manifestation (vivarta) of Brahman. Vivartavada states that although Brahman appears to undergo a transformation, in fact no real change takes place. The myriad of beings are unreal manifestation, as the only real being is Brahman, that ultimate reality which is unborn, unchanging, and entirely without parts.

The Brahma Sutras, the ancient Vedantins, most sub-schools of Vedānta, as well as Samkhya argue for parinamavada. The "most visible advocates of Vivartavada," states Nicholson, are the Advaitins, the followers of Shankara. "Although the world can be described as conventionally real," adds Nicholson, "the Advaitins claim that all of Brahman's effects must ultimately be acknowledged as unreal before the individual self can be liberated."

Yet, scholars disagree on whether Adi Shankara and his Advaita system explain causality through parinamavada or through vivartavada. Scholars such as Hajime Nakamura and Paul Hacker state that Adi Shankara does not advocate Vivartavada and that his explanations are "remote from any connotation of illusion." According to these scholars, it was the 13th century scholar Prakasatman who gave a definition to Vivarta and it is Prakasatman's theory that is sometimes misunderstood as Adi Shankara's position. (Note: According to Hugh Nicholson, "the definitive study on the development of the concept of vivarta in Indian philosophy, and in Advaita Vedanta in particular, remains Hacker's Vivarta. To Shankara, the word maya has hardly any terminological weight.) Andrew Nicholson concurs with Hacker and other scholars, adding that the vivarta-vada isn't Shankara's theory, that Shankara's ideas appear closer to parinama-vada, and that the vivarta explanation likely emerged gradually in Advaita subschool later. (Note: Compare the misunderstanding of Yogacharas concept of vijñapti-mātra, 'representation-only', as 'consciousness-only'.)

== Rejection ==
Vijnanabhiksu portrays casual relation as having three terms: unchangeable locus cause, changeable locus cause and effect. The locus cause is inseparable from and does not inhere in the changeable cause and the effect.

The Pratyabhijna philosophy of Somananda refutes the Arambhvada (the 'Realistic view' of the Nyaya-Vaisesika), the Parinamavada (the theory of Transformation of the Sankhya-Yoga) and the Vivartavada (the theory of Manifestation of the Advaita), by postulating the theory of Svatantryavada (the 'Universal voluntarism') which states that it is due to the sovereignty of God’s Will that Effect evolves from Cause.

Whereas Ramanuja accepts Prakrti as the material cause but Madhava rejects this contention since material cause does not mean that which controls and superintends; Madhava also rejects the Vivartavada because it does not accept any effect that has got to be accounted for. In his philosophy of pure non-dualism (Shuddhadvaita), Vallabhacharya also does not support 'vivartavada' and propounds that Maya (or the 'Jagat') is real and is only a power of Brahman who himself manifests, of his own will, as Jiva and the world and there is no transformation of Brahman in doing so, just as a gold ornament still remains gold only. Shuddhadvaita is also therefore known as ‘Avikṛta Pariṇāmavāda’ (Unmodified transformation).

== Sources ==
Printed sources

- Hugh Nicholson (2011). Comparative Theology and the Problem of Religious Rivalry. Oxford University Press. ISBN 978-0-19-977286-5.
- King, Richard (1999), Indian philosophy: an introduction to Hindu and Buddhist thought, Edinburgh University Press, ISBN 0-87840-756-1
- Mayeda, Sengaku (2006), "An Introduction to the Life and Thought of Sankara", in Mayeda, Sengaku (ed.), A Thousand Teachings: The Upadeśasāhasrī of Śaṅkara, Motilal Banarsidass, ISBN 978-8120827714
- Nicholson, Andrew J. (2010), Unifying Hinduism: Philosophy and Identity in Indian Intellectual History, Columbia University Press

Web-sources
