= Samkhyakarika =

Text of the Samkhya school of Indian philosophy

The Sāṅkhyakārikā (Sanskrit: साङ्ख्यकारिका, Sāṅkhyakārikā, sometimes spelled Sāṃkhyakārikā) is the earliest surviving text of the Sāṅkhya (sometimes Sāṃkhya) school of Indian philosophy. The text's original composition date is unknown, but its terminus ad quem (completed before) date has been established through its Chinese translation that became available by 569 CE. It is attributed to Īśvarakṛṣṇa (fl. 350 CE).

In the text, the author described himself as a successor of the disciples from the great sage Kapila, through Āsuri and Pañcaśikha. His Sāṁkhya Kārikā consists of 72 ślokas written in the Ārya metre, with the last verse asserting that the original Samkhya Karika had only 70 verses.

== Commentaries ==
There are three known commentaries on the Samkhyakarika. The earliest commentary is the Gaudapada-bhashya, written by Gaudapada. The Tattvakaumudi is a commentary written by Vacaspati Misra. The Yuktidipika, whose author is unknown, is also a notable commentary on the Samkhyakarika. Medieval era manuscript editions of the Yuktidipika were discovered and published in the mid 20th-century. Gerald James Larson notes two other commentaries on the Samkhyakarika, the Matharavrtti and the Jayamangala (likely before 9th-century).

== Translations ==
The Sāṁkhya Kārikā was translated into Chinese in the sixth century CE by Paramartha. In 1832, Christian Lassen translated the text in Latin. H.T. Colebrooke first translated this text into English. Windischmann and Lorinser translated it into German, and Pautier and St. Hilaire translated it into French.

== Authorship and chronology ==
Samkhya is an important pillar of Indian philosophical tradition, called shad-darshana, however, of the standard works of Samkhya only three are available at present. These are: Samkhya Sutras attributed to the founder of Samkhya, Kapila; Tattva Samasa, which some authors (Max Muller) consider prior to Samkhya Sutras, and Samkhyakarika authored by Ishvara Krishna. Ishvara Krishna follows several earlier teachers of Samkhya and is said to come from Kausika family. He taught before Vasubandhu and is placed following Kapila, Asuri, Panchashikha, Vindhyavasa, Varsaganya, Jaigisavia, Vodhu, Devala and Sanaka.

The significance
Besides the Vedanta school, the Samkhya school is the one which exerted the greatest influence upon the history of Indian thought, and a blending and synthesis of the thought of the two schools can often be found in important works of thought in India. The Samkhyakarika is the classical text book of the Samkhya school.

— Hajime Nakamura

Gerald Larson notes that the Samkhyakarika was composed sometime in the Gupta Empire period, between 320-540 CE. The translation of Paramartha into Chinese together with a commentary was composed over 557-569 CE, has survived in China, and it constitutes the oldest surviving version of the Samkhyakarika. Several manuscripts, with slightly variant verses are known, but these do not challenge the basic thesis or the overall meaning of the text.

While Samkhya ideas developed in the second half of the 1st millennium BCE through the Gupta period, the analysis of evidence shows, states Larson, that Samkhya is rooted in the speculations of the Vedic era Brahmanas and the oldest Upanishads of Hinduism on the nature of man, and that it is generally agreed that Samkhya's formulation took place at the earliest after the oldest Upanishads had been composed (~800 BCE).

In terms of comparative textual chronology. Larson states that the final redaction of Yogasutra and the writing of Samkhyakarika were probably contemporaneous. The Samkhya literature grew with later developments such as Vacaspati Mishra's Tattvakaumudi.

== Structure ==
=== Number of verses ===
The Samkhyakarika, wrote ancient Hindu scholars Gaudapada and Vacaspati Misra, contains seventy two verses. However, Gaudapada commented on the first sixty nine, leading 19th-century colonial era scholars to suggest that the last three may have been added later. With the discovery of 6th-century manuscripts of translations of the Indian text into Chinese language, it became clear that by the 6th-century, the Samkhyakarika had seventy two verses. The Chinese version includes commentary on the Samkhyakarika, but for unknown reasons, skips or misses the commentary on verse sixty three.

In mid 20th-century, the first manuscript of Yuktidipika was discovered in India, which is a review and commentary on the Karika. Yuktidipika, for unknown reasons, skipped commenting on verses sixty through sixty three, verse sixty five and sixty six, but reviews and analyzes the remaining 66 of 72 verses.

The medieval era Matharavrtti text states that the Karika has seventy three verses. In contrast, verse seventy two of the surviving 6th-century CE Karika declares that its original had just seventy verses, implying that a more ancient version of Samkhyakarika once existed. Scholars have attempted to produce a critical edition, by identifying the most ancient original set of seventy verses, but this effort has not produced a consensus among scholars. In terms of content, importance and meaning, the text is essentially the same regardless of which version of the manuscript is referred to.

=== Meter ===
Each verse of the philosophical Samkhyakarika text is composed in a precise mathematical meter, that repeats in a musical rhythm of an Arya meter (also called the Gatha, or song, meter). Every verse is set in two half stanza with the following rule: both halves have exactly repeating total instants and repeating sub-total pattern in the manner of many ancient Sanskrit compositions. The stanza is divided into feet, each feet has four instants, with its short syllable counting as one instant (matra), while the long syllable prosodically counts are two instants.

Each verse of the Samkhyakarika is presented in four quarters (two quarters making one half). The first quarter has exactly three feet (12 beats), the second quarter four and half feet (18 beats), the third quarter of every verse has three feet (12 beats again), while the fourth quarter has three and a half plus an extra short syllable at its end (15 beats). Thus, metrically, the first half stanza of every verse of this philosophical text has thirty instants, the second has twenty seven.

== Contents ==
Samkhya emerged in the Vedic tradition, states Gerald Larson, and the Samkhyakarika is an important text that was the fruit of those efforts.

=== Goal of the text: verses 1 to 3 ===
The Samkhyakarika opens by stating that the pursuit of happiness is a basic need of all human beings. Yet, one is afflicted by three forms of suffering, a truth that motivates this text to study means of counteracting suffering:

दुःखत्रयाभिघाताज्जिज्ञासा तदभिघातके हेतौ ।
दृष्टे सापार्था चेन्नैकान्तात्यन्ततोऽभावात् ॥ १ ॥

Because of the torment of the three-fold suffering, arises this inquiry to know the means of counteracting it. If it is said that such inquiry is useless because perceptible means of removal exist, we say no because these means are neither lasting nor effective. (1)

— Samkhyakarika, Verse 1

The three causes of unhappiness (or the problem of suffering, evil in life) are adhyatmika that is caused by self; adhibhautika that is caused by others and external influences; and, adhidaivika that is caused by nature and supernatural agencies. The suffering are two types, of body and of mind. The perceptible means of treatment include physicians, remedies, magic, incantations, expert knowledge of moral and political science, while avoidance through residence in safe places are also perceptible means available. These obvious means, state scholars, are considered by Samkhyakarika, as temporary as they do not provide absolute or final removal of suffering.

Verse 2 asserts that scriptures, too, are visible means available, yet they, too, are ultimately ineffective in relieving sorrow and giving spiritual contentment, because scriptures deal with impurity, decay and inequality. The verse then posits its thesis, states Larson, that "a superior method different from both" exists, and this is the path of knowledge and understanding. More specifically, liberation from suffering comes from discriminative knowledge of Vyakta (evolving, manifest world), Avyakta (unevolving, unmanifest empirical world, Prakrti), and Jna (knower, self, Purusha).

Verse 3 introduces the ontology of the tradition, nothing that that Mulaprakrti (primordial nature) is uncreated, seven tattvas (elements), starting with mahat (intellect), are both created and creative, sixteen tattvas are created and evolve (but are not creative), whilst Purusha is neither created nor creative and does not evolve. It simply exists. Thus, altogether, there are twenty five tattvas.

=== Means of knowledge: verses 4 to 8 ===
Verse 4 introduces the epistemology of Samkhya school of Hindu philosophy, and states that there are three pramana, that is reliable paths to reliable knowledge: perception, inference and the testimony of reliable person. All other paths to knowing anything is derived from these three, states the Samkhyakarika. It then adds that these three paths can enable one to know twenty five Tattvas that exist. Verse 5 of Samkhyakarika defines perception as the immediate knowledge one gains by the interaction of sense organ with anything; inference, it defines as the knowledge one gains based on meditation on one's perception; and testimony as that knowledge one gains from the efforts of those one considers as a reliable source; it then succinctly asserts that there are three types of inferences for the epistemic quest of man, without explaining what these three types of inferences are.

Verse 6 asserts that objects can be known either through sensory organs or through super-sense (inner derivation from observations). Verse 7 of the Samkhyakarika states that perception alone is not sufficient means to know objects and principles behind observed reality, certain existent things are not perceived and are derived. The text in verse 8 asserts that the existence of Prakriti (empirical nature, substances) is proven by perception but its subtle principles are non-perceptible. The text notes that the human mind, among others, emerge from Prakriti but are not directly perceptible, rather inferred and self derived. The reality of mind and such differ and resemble Prakriti in different aspects.

=== The theory of causation and the doctrine of Gunas: verses 9 to 14 ===
Samkhyakarika, in verse 9 introduces its theory of satkaryavada (causation), asserting that "the effect is pre-existent in the cause". That which exists, states the Samkhyakarika, has a cause; that which exists not, lacks a cause; and when there exists a cause, in it is the seed and longing for the effect; that, a potent cause produces that which it is capable of. Hence, it is nature of existence that "perceptible principles exist in nature", and effects are manifestation of the perceptible principles. The Samkhya theory of causation, satkāryavāda, is also referred to as the theory of existent effect.

Verse 10 asserts that there are two kinds of principles operating in the universe: discrete, un-discrete. The discrete is inconstant, isolated and unpervading, mutable, supporting, mergent, conjunct and with an agent. The un-discrete is constant, field-like, pervasive, immutable, non-supporting, non-mergent, separable and independent of an agent. Both discrete and un-discrete, describes the Samkhyakarika in verse 11, are simultaneously imbued with three qualities, and these qualities (Guṇa) are objective, common, prolific, do not discriminate and are innate. It is in these respects, asserts the Samkhyakarika, that they are the reverse of the nature of the self because the self is devoid of these qualities.

The text in verse 12 states that the three guṇa (qualities), that is sattva, tamas and rajas, respectively correspond to pleasure, pain and dulness, mutually domineer, produce each other, rest on each other, always reciprocally present and work together. This Samkhya theory of qualities have been widely adopted by various schools of Hinduism for categorizing behavior and natural phenomena.

Verses 13-14 state that sattva is good, enlightening and illuminating, rajas is urgent, motion and restless, whilst tamas is darkness, obscuring and distressing; these work together in observed nature just like oil, wick and fire together in a lamp. Nature merely undergoes modification, transformation, or change in appearance, but this is innate effect that already was in the cause, because asserts the Samkhyakarika, nothing cannot produce something.

=== Nature of Prakrti: verses 15 to 16 ===
The Samkhyakarika defines Prakriti as "that nature which evolves", and asserts to be the material cause of the empirically observed world. Prakriti, according to the text, both physical and psychical, is that which is manifested as the matrix of all modifications. Prakriti is not primal matter, nor the metaphysical universal, rather it is the basis of all objective existence, matter, life and mind.

Prakriti has two dimensions, that which is vyakta (manifest), and that which is avyakta (unmanifest). Both have the three guṇas that, states the text, is in continual tension with one another, and it is their mutual interaction on Prakriti that causes the emergence of the world as we know it. When the three guṇas are in equilibrium, no modification occurs; when one of three innate qualities is more active, the process of evolution is in action, change emerges (gunaparinama). These two verses are significant, states Larson, in aphoristically presenting Samkhya's doctrines of causation, relationship between vyakta and avyakta, and its doctrine of what drives evolution.

=== Nature of Purusha: verses 17 to 19 ===
Samkhyakarika asserts, states Larson, that apart from Prakriti and the emergent creation, of equilibrium and evolution, exists Purusha (or self, soul). Purusha is pure consciousness, is itself inactive yet whose presence disrupts the equilibrium of the three Guṇas in their unmanifest condition. The disruption triggers the emergence of the manifested condition of empirical reality we experience, states the text.

More specifically, verse 17 offers a proof that soul exists, as follows:

सङ्घातपरार्थत्वात् त्रिगुणादिविपर्ययादधिष्ठानात् ।
पुरुषोऽस्ति भोक्तृभावात्कैवल्यार्थं प्रवृत्तेश्च ॥ १७ ॥

Because the assemblage of empirically observed objects is for another's use (I-principle); because the converse of that which has the three qualities with other properties must exist (from regressus ad infinitum principle); because there must be superintendence (supervising conscious agent or chariot principle); because there must be one to enjoy; because there is a tendency to abstraction; therefore soul exists.

— Samkhyakarika 17,

Verse 18 of the Samkhyakarika asserts that many souls must exist because numerous living beings are born, die and exist; because guṇas are operating and affect everyone differently; and because everyone is endowed with instruments of cognition and action. Verse 19 states that the soul is the conscious "witness, separate, neutral, seer and inactive".

=== The connection between Prakriti and Purusha: verses 20 to 21 ===
A living being is a union of Prakriti and Purusha, posits Samkhya-karika in verses 20-21. The Prakriti as the insentient evolute, joins with Purusha which is sentient consciousness.

The Karika states that the purpose of this union of Prakriti and Purusha, creating the reality of the observed universe, is to actualize a two-fold symbiosis. One, it empowers the individual to enjoy and contemplate on Prakriti and Purusha through self-awareness; and second, the conjunction of Prakriti and Purusha empowers the path of Kaivalya and Moksha (liberation, freedom).

The verse 21 aphoristically mention the example of "the blind and the lame", referring to the Indian legend of a blind and a lame person left in the forest, who find each other, inspire mutual trust and confidence, agree to share the duties with the blind doing the walking and the lame doing the seeing, the lame sits on blind's shoulder, and thus explore and travel through the forest. Soul (Purusha), in this allegory, is similarly symbiotically joined with body and nature (Prakriti) in the journey of life. Soul desires freedom, meaning and liberation, and this it can achieve through contemplation and abstraction.

These verses present a peculiar form of dualism, states Gerald Larson, because they assert unconscious primordial "stuff" on one hand, and pure consciousness on the other. This contrasts with dualism presented in other schools of Hindu philosophy where dualism focuses on the nature of individual soul and Brahman (universal reality).

=== The theory of emergence of principles: verses 22 to 38 ===
These verses, states Larson, provide a detailed discussion of the theory of emergence, that is what emerges, how and the functioning of the different emergents. The discussion includes the emergence of buddhi (intelligence), the ahamkara (ego), the manas (mind), the five buddhindriyas (sensory organs), the five karmendriyas (action organs), the five tanmantras (subtle elements), the five mahabhutas (gross elements), and thereafter the text proceeds to detailing its theory of knowledge process.

The Karika's verse 22 asserts that Mahat (the Great Principle, intellect) is the first evolute of nature (Prakriti, human body), from it emerges ego (Ahamkara, I-principle), from which interface the "set of sixteen" (discussed in later verses). Verses 23-25 describes Sattva, as the quality of seeking goodness, wisdom, virtue, non-attachment. The reverse of Sattva, asserts Karika is Tamasa. Sattva is the characteristic of intellect, states the text.

The Karika lists the sensory organs to be the eyes, ears, nose, tongue and skin, while action organs as those of voice, hands, feet, excretory organs and that of procreation. Mind, states the text, is both a sensory organ in some aspects, and an organ of action in other aspects. Mind ponders, it is cognate, it integrates information and then interacts with the organs of action, it is also modified by the three innate qualities and diverse manifestations of it, asserts the text. Ego (Ahamkara), states the text, is self-assertion. Sattva influenced sensory organs and action organs create the Vaikrita form of Ahamkara, while Tamasa influence creates the Bhutadi Ahamkara or the Tanmatras.

Verses 29-30 of the text assert that all the organs depend on prana (breath or life), and that it is prana that connects them to the unseen one, the soul. The three internal emergent faculties (Trayasya), states Karika in verse 29, are mind, ego and the ability to reason. The sensory and action organs perform their respective function, by cooperating with each other, fueled by the life-force, while the soul is the independent observer. The organs manifest the object and the purpose of one's soul, not the purpose of anything outside of oneself, states verse 31 of the text. Verses 32 through 35 of Karika present its theory how the various sensory organs operate and cooperate to gain information, how action organs apprehend and manifest driven by mind, ego and three innate qualities (Gunas). Verses 36 and 37 assert that all sensory organs cooperate to present information to the mind, and it is the mind that presents knowledge and feelings to one's soul (Purusha within).

=== The theory of reality: verses 39 to 59 ===
The Samkhya-karika in these verses, states Larson, discusses its theory of reality and how one experiences it. The text includes the discussion of impulses and bhavas (dispositions, desires) that produce human experience and determine subjective reality. The Karika asserts that there is twofold emergence of reality, one which is objective, elemental and external; another which is subjective, formulating in mind and internal. It interfaces these with its epistemic theory of knowledge, that is perception, inference and the testimony of reliable person, then presenting its theory of error, theory of complacency, theory of virtue and necessary conditions for suffering, happiness and release.

Verse 39 begins with three specific evolutes of Prakrti: subtle bodies, bodies received from parents, and gross elements. The bodies received from our parents are our tangible bodies, which the Samkhyakarika asserts are perishable. Verse 40 goes on to explain that the subtle bodies are permanent, created during the creation of the universe. Verse 41, through an analogy of the non-existence of paintings and shadows without their substratum, asserts that the buddhi etc. require the subtle body in order to exist. Verse 42 goes on to state that the subtle body operates as Purusha requires it to. Verses 43 and 44 outline the locus of dharma and adharma, and their effects. Verses 45 to 47 continue by outlining the various effects of the gunas and the nature of the buddhi.

=== The theory of understanding and freedom: verses 60 to 69 ===
The verses 60-69 begin by stating the duality theory of the Samkhya school, which asserts that Prakriti (nature) and Purusha (soul) are absolutely separate.

No soul (Purusha) therefore is bound, no one released, likewise no one transmigrates.;
Only nature (Prakriti) in its various forms transmigrates, is bound and is released.

— Samkhyakarika 62,

The state of freedom
By that pure single knowledge,
the soul beholds nature
like a spectator seated at a play beholds an actress.

— Gaudapada's bhashya on Samkhya-karika 65

The Karika, in verse 63, asserts that human nature variously binds itself by a combination of seven means: weakness, vice, ignorance, power, passion, dispassion and virtue. That same nature, once aware of soul's object, liberates by one means: knowledge. Verse 64 of the text states that this knowledge is obtained from the study of principles, that there is a difference between inert nature and conscious soul, nature is not consciousness, consciousness is not enslaved to nature and that consciousness is "complete, free from error, pure and kevala (solitary)". Man's deepest selfhood in these verses of Karika, states Larson, is not his empirical ego or his intelligence, rather it is his consciousness, and "this knowledge of the absolute otherness of consciousness frees man from the illusion of bondage and brings man's deepest selfhood into absolute freedom (kaivalya)".

== God and Liberation in the Samkhyakarika ==
The Karika is silent about God, states Johannes Bronkhorst, neither denying nor affirming the existence of God. The text discusses existence and consciousness, how the world came into existence and what is the relationship between nature and soul. The numerous Sanskrit commentaries on Samkhyakarika from 1st millennium CE through the 2nd millennium, states Bronkhorst, extensively use the Karika to discuss the question whether or not God is the cause of the world.

Vācaspati Mishra’s commentary on the Samkhyakarika, the Tattvakaumudi, for example, states that the creation could not have been supervised by God, since God is without activity and has no need for activity. Further, citing Karika's verses 56-57 and others, that another reason why God cannot be considered the creator of the world, is that God has no desires and no purpose is served for God by creating the universe. The text asserts that there is suffering and evil experienced by living beings, but God who is considered to be free from the three Gunas (qualities) could not be creating Guna in living beings and the vicissitudes of living beings, therefore God is neither the cause of suffering and evil nor the cause of the world.

The commentary that was translated into Chinese in 6th-century CE by Paramārtha, states in its review and analysis of Samkhya-karika:

You say that God is the cause. This is not correct. Why so? Since He is without genetic constituents (Guna). God does not possess the three genetic constituents, whereas the world does possess the three genetic constituents. The cause and the effect would not resemble each other; therefore God is not the cause.

— Paramārtha translation of Samkhya-karika 61 commentary, Translated from Chinese by Johannes Bronkhorst

The 11th-century Buddhist commentator Jnanasribhadra, frequently cites various Hindu schools of philosophies in his Arya-Lankavatara Vritti, of which Samkhya school and Samkhya-karika is the most common. Jnanasribhadra states, citing Samkhya-karika, that Samkhyans believe in the existence of the soul and the world, in contrast to teachings in the Buddhist text Laṅkāvatāra Sūtra, adding that many Samkhyans are atheistic.

Samkhya is an atheistic philosophy according to Paul Deussen and other scholars.

Jnanasribhadra quotes the Samkhyakarika, Gaudapadabhasya, and Matharavritti to summarize Samkhya school's position on the path to liberation:

It is said (in Samkhya) that by the extinction of the evil desires, by understanding the distinction between Prakriti and Purusha, one could attain liberation.

— Jnanasribhadra, Arya-lankavatara-vrtti 15a-b

== See also ==
- Samkhyakarika darshan

== Bibliography ==
Texts

- Tattva-Kaumudi (Sankhya) of Vachaspati Misra , English translation with the Sanskrit text by Ganganatha Jha. Central Secretariat Library. 1896.
- Samkhyakarika of Iswara Krishna Henry Colebrook (Translator), Oxford University Press, Oxford
- Samkhyakarika of Iswara Krishna John Davis (Translator), Trubner, London, University of Toronto Archives
- Samkhya Karika with Gaudapada's commentary (html format), trans. by Dr. Har Dutt Sharma (1933)
- Samkhya Karika (E.A. Welden translation) at the Internet Archive
- Samkhya Karika in PDF
- Samkhya karika with Gaudapada Bhasya, Sanskrit Original
- Yuktidipika - a medieval era text that reviews and comments on Samkhyakarika, Sanskrit Original (one of two editions published)

Papers

- Knut Jacobsen (2006), What similes in Samkhya do: a comparison of the similes in the Samkhya texts in the Mahabharata, the 'Samkhyakarika and the Samkhyasutra, Journal of Indian philosophy, 34(6), pages 587-605
