= Satkaryavada =

Theory of causation in Hindu-philosophy

The Samkhya school of philosophy, which follows Prakṛti Parinama-vada (doctrine of the transformation of objective nature), describes the origination and evolution of universe through its theory of Satkāryavāda (Sanskrit: सत्कार्यवाद) which is the theory of causation. According to this theory, the manifested effect is pre-existent in the cause; and the original material cause of everything that is perceived is Prakriti. When Prakriti is not in proximity with immutable Purusha, the conscious ability (chiti-shakti), the three modes (gunas-sattva, rajas and tamas) of prakriti are in equipoise and prakriti is an unmanifest potential. When the conscious ability and the objective ability interact the three modes of the objective nature become disturbed and enter a state of flux giving rise to diverse manifest appearance.

== Overview ==
Satkāryavāda is the Samkhya theory of the pre-existent effect, which states that the effect Karya already exists in its material cause, which is Sat, and therefore nothing new is brought into existence.

This theory uses two basic concepts.

- Sat(सत्) – existence
- Karya(कार्य)- the manifested effect

This theory asserts that something that exists (Sat), cannot originate from non-existence (Asat).

This theory, also associated with the Yoga school of Patanjali, is the systematic unfolding of Uddalaka Aruni’s 'substantialism' and 'eternalism' (Sassatavada). Ishvarakrishna in his Samkhyakarika Sl.9 gives five reasons why the effect has to pre-exist in its material cause –

असदकरणादुपादानग्रहणात् सर्वसम्भवाभावात् ।

शक्तस्य शक्यकरणात् कारणभावाच्च सत्कार्यम् ॥ ९ ॥

1. what is not cannot be produced,
2. the effect requires a material cause,
3. not everything arises from everything,
4. the cause produces only what corresponds to its potential
5. the effect has the nature of the cause.

== Vedic roots ==
During Vedic times, in seeking to determine the rta or order underlying all phenomena, a postulation was made that change can be understood in terms of a potency inherent in these phenomena, that is, in the cause to produce the effect, this potency was termed svadha (own power). But later on, the reality of change itself came into question. However, the Upanishads and Samkhya, though differing on whether phenomenal change was an illusion or real, accepted satkaryavada. Svadha and satkaryavada go beyond efficient causation to partake of nature of formal and material cause. Pratītyasamutpāda of the Buddhists implies a non-linear kind of causality; the word paccaya of paccaya-namarupa literally means support, and this presents causation not in terms of unilateral power but in terms of relationship. The Buddhists consider all modes of relation to have casual significance.

== Vedanta explanation ==
From Chandogya Upanishad III.19 and Taittiriya Upanishad II.7, it appears that being emerged from the pregnant and undifferentiated chaos known as asat ('non-being') but the Brahmanas describe creation as the transformation of sat referred to as the impersonal abstract reality (Taittiriya Upanishad II.i ) or as the personal creator (Prasna Upanishad I.4); satkaryavada envisages creation as parinama::vikara ('modification') of Brahman (Brahma Sutras II.i.7) which orthodox view is not accepted by the followers of Advaita Vedanta who place their belief in Vivartavada, the theory of superimposition.

Gaudapada, advocating ajativada, states that mithya ('false', 'unreal') effect has a mithya origination; it is not a real origination. Therefore, Totakacharya, a disciple of Shankara, in Srutisarasamuddharanam Sloka 151 states – even if one thinks that the world, beginning with the mind, does somehow originate according to either the prior existence or the non-existence (of the effect), even then it is not real; for the sruti has declared that it is unreal.

According to Vedanta, Brahman, the ever-existing non-dual entity sat but who is the eternal subject and not an object to be known, is the sole source of joy (rasah), a non-entity cannot be a source of happiness. Brahman is the cause of creation. As Saguna Brahman or Ishvara, with his power of the beginningless maya, he brings forth this creation which is also beginningless, controls and rules it as the Lord within. Maya is Prakrti (avayakrta) composed of three Gunas. Sankara extends satkaryavada to state that creation is but manifestation of names and forms only; by transforming into Becoming the indeterminate becomes determinate in association with maya, otherwise the world is unreal – the acosmic approach shows creation to be a superimposition on Brahman whereas according to the subjective approach the phenomenal world of diversity is unreal, a mere dream.

Sankara defends satkaryavada against asatkaryavada but in the light of vivartavada as distinguished from parinamavada, he posits the infinite and eternal as the goal of human aspirations, distinguishing paramartha and vyavahara and agreeing that the former is timeless and the latter, fundamentally impermanent and insubstantial, differing though in their analysis of empirical things and causality. He states that the sruti speaks of prarabdha from an empirical point of view; prarabdha is accepted for origination (or birth) to account for differences of beings etc., which difference cannot be otherwise produced. In the same context but opposing Sankara’s view-point, Ramanuja, the proponent of Vishishtadvaita, in his Vedarthasamgraha defines creation thus – Brahman whose body is formed by animate and inanimate beings, who in his gross form is divided by distinctions of names and forms, is presented in the effect; this disunited and gross state of Brahman is called creation.

== Samkhya delineation ==
Satkaryavada is the Samkhya theory of the pre-existent effect, that the effect (karya) already exists in its material cause and therefore, nothing new is brought into existence or produced in the process of creation. This theory, also associated with the Yoga school, is the systematic unfolding of Udalaka Aruni’s (Chandogya Upanishad VI.i.4-5) 'substantialism' and 'eternalism'. Ishvarakrishna in his Samkhyakarika (Sloka 9):

असदकर्णाद् उपादान ग्रहणात् सर्वसम्भवाभावात् |
शक्तस्य शक्यकर्णात् कारणभावाच्च सत्कार्यम् ||

gives five reasons why the effect has to pre-exist in its material cause – a) asadkarnat - what is not cannot be produced, b) upadana grahanat - the effect requires a material cause, c) sarvasambhavabhavat - not everything arises from everything, d) saktasya-sakya-karnat - the cause produces only what corresponds to its potential and e) karanabhavat - the effect has the nature of the cause.

The followers of the Samkhya school hold that karya ('effect') is sat ('existent') even before karakavyapara ('causal operation') renders avirbhuta ('manifest') from tirohita ('unmanifest condition'). The Samkhyas uphold Parinama-vada, that the cause is continuously transforming itself into effect. They advocate two eternal realities, Prakrti and Purusha; the five-fold reasoning for the inference of Purusha are (Samkhyakarika Sl.10)–

हेतुमद् अनित्यमव्यापि सक्रियमनेकमाश्रितं लिङ्गम् |
सावयवं परतन्त्रं व्यक्तं विपरीतमव्यक्तम् ||

Prakrti and its evolutes all serve the purpose of the self which is Consciousness, b) the self whose purpose is served by Prakrti must be different from everything composed of the three gunas, c) experiences suggest a transcendental synthetic unity of pure consciousness to co-ordinate all experiences for knowledge pre-supposes the existence of the self, d) the physical universe needs a sentient purusha to experience it and e) there is the desire to escape from prakrti (Samkhyakarika Sl.10).

== Opposition ==
Asatkaryavada also called the arambhavada or new beginning. Against the asatkaryavada view of causality accepted by the Nyaya and the Vaisheshikas, the Samkhyas aver that if the effect were something totally new, without prior existence in any form, then one would have to admit the production of existence from non-existence, which is not possible. But Sankara questions the Samkhya contention, he asks – if the effect actually pre-exists how can there be genuine change?
