= Pradhana =

Adjective meaning "most important, prime, chief, or major"

In Samkhya, pradhāna (Sanskrit: प्रधान) is the "primal matter," "the first principle from which all material things have evolved. It is an alternate term for prakriti ('material nature' and material desires) in a state of equilibrium of the three gunas – sattva, rajas and tamas, the three modes of prakrti. When purusha (primal consciousness) comes in contact with prakriti, the balance is distorted, and the 23 principles ('the world') evolves from prakriti.

Badarayana’s Brahma sutras state that pradhana is asabadam, 'not mentioned in the Upanishads', and therefore to be rejected as the first cause. Instead, the later Advaita tradition postulates Brahman as the intelligent, conscious first principle and material and efficient cause of the universe.

== Etymology ==
Pradhāna (Sanskrit: प्रधान) is an adjective meaning "most important, prime, chief or major". The Shatapatha Brahmana (शतपथ ब्राह्मण) gives its meaning as "the chief cause of the material nature" (S.B.7.15.27) or "the creative principle of nature" (S.B.10.85.3).

== Samkhya ==
In Samkhya, pradhāna (Sanskrit: प्रधान) is an alternate term for prakriti ('material nature' and material desires), the "primal matter" and "the first principle from which all material things have evolved." It is a state of equilibrium of the three gunas – sattva, rajas and tamas, the three modes of prakrti. When purusha (primal consciousness) comes in contact with prakriti, the balance is distorted, and the 24 principles ('the world') evolves from prakriti.

The term 'samkhya' is derived from the word sankhya (numbers), referring to the listing or numbering of the basic principles, purusha, the twenty-four principles of prakrti, and the 'right discrimination' between these principles. Purusha is unproduced, free from all action and modification, without attributes, all-pervading consciousness, individual and separate for each body. When Pradhana manifests it becomes the efficient and the material cause of creation. Prakrti is eternal and all-pervading, unlimited and the material cause, eternally producing everything but insentient.

== Vedanta ==
The Brahma Sutras of Badarayana are the oldest extent comprehensive treatment in a systematic manner of the vast corpus of Vedic Thought. In B.S.I.i.5, Badarayana states that pradhana is asabadam, 'not mentioned in the Upanishads', and therefor to be rejected.

=== Advaita Vedanta ===
Brahma Sutra I.i.5 states:

The Pradhana of the Samkhyas is not the cause of the universe, because it is not mentioned in the Upanishads, which fact is clear from the fact of seeing (or thinking).

Sankara (and Ramanuja) interpret the word asabadam (meaning 'not mentioned in the Upanishads') in ईक्षतेर्नाशब्दम् to mean the pradhana of the Samkhyas, and na (meaning not) as the denial of pradhana being the cause of the universe, because it is not mentioned in the Upanishads. For Badarayana, the word 'ikshate' (meaning seeing or thinking) refers to Brahman, who visualized and created prana (the vital force, Prasna Upanishad VI.3-4), and created the worlds (Aitareya Upanishad I.i.1-2).

Sankara, in his commentary on the Brahma Sutras, argues:

- A. insentient pradhana cannot illuminate sattva, which can only be illumined by the consciousness of the witnessing Soul,
- B. an insentient pradhana cannot have the sentient Atman or Brahman as its essence,
- C. Atman implies a conscious entity in the primary sense which can instruct; here Brahman is that Existence which visualizes and not Pradhana,
- D. Pradhana is not even indirectly referred to by the Upanishads as the sentient Atman; even if it is the cause of all objects of experience, it will still remain unknown, because the experiencing subjects as a class are not modifications of Pradhana,
- E. sentient beings can merge only in a conscious entity which Pradhana is not,
- F. consciousness is apprehended uniformly as the first cause,
- G. Shvetashvatara Upanishad (VI.9) introduces the all-knowing God, who has no master or originator or ordainer, as the cause and the ordainer of the masters of the organs.

According to Chattopadhyaya, sutra I.i.12 – आनन्दमयोऽभ्यासात्, is textually wrong, it should have been worded anandobhyasat because ananda is absolute freedom; if ananda is embodied it becomes non-limited, i.e. subjected to limitation.

According to Sivananda, the inert pradhana cannot create, because activity is necessary for creation. It is not a directive intelligent entity which could initiate activity, and there is no external agency to urge it to act, or restrain it from action. A spontaneous action of pradhana is not possible; it cannot modify in the absence of purpose, and it cannot have a desire to evolve. Purusa is intelligent and indifferent, but there is no third agency to bring Purusa near Pradhana to effect a connection between the two for starting the activity of creation. Pradhana cannot be active, because there can be no relation of principal or subordinate guna, when the gunas are in equilibrium to constitute Pradhana. Creation cannot proceed from inert or dead matter.

=== Madhvacharya ===
Madhva, the founder of Tattvavada (Realism), interprets the word asabadam to refer to Brahman, who is inexpressible because he is an object of knowledge. Madhva contends that an object presented in illusory perception is an absolute unreality, and no illusion can be explained without the acceptance of two necessary reals – adhisthana ('substratum') and pradhana ('prototype') of the superimposed object (aropya). In the Dvaita school of Hindu philosophy, Ishvara, the cause of the universe is the svatantra tattva ('independent reality'), and the created universe is the asvatantra tattva ('dependent reality'), which is a transformation of pradhana ('matter').

== Sources ==
Printed sources

- Adams, George C. (1993). The Structure and Meaning of Badarayana's Brahma Sutras. Motilal Banarsidass. ISBN 9788120809314.
- Gambhirananda, Swami (2021). Brahma Sutra Bhasya of Sankaracarya. Advaita Ashram.
- Hughes, David Bruce. Sri Vedanta-sutra, Adhyaya 2. Esoteric Teachings Seminar.
- Chattopadhyaya, Shyama Kumar (2000). The Philosophy of Sankar's Advaita Vedanta. Sarup & Sons. ISBN 9788176252225.
- Lochtefeld, James G. (2002). The Illustrated Encyclopedia of Hinduism. The Rosen Publishing Group, Inc.
- Patton, Laurie L. (1994). Authority, Anxiety, and Canon: Essays in Vedic Interpretation. SUNY Press. ISBN 9780791419380.
- Rajarshi, Mini S. (2006). Yoga: A Synthesis of Psychology and Metaphysics. Motilal Banarsidass Publishe. ISBN 978-81-208-3098-1.
- Krishnamurti Sharma, B.N. (1986). Philosophy of Madhvacharya. Motilal Banarsidass. ISBN 9788120800687.
- Sivananda, Swami (1999). Brahma Sutras. Islamic Books.

Web-sources
