= Asuri (Samkhya) =

Indian Philosopher

Mahamuni Asuri
- आसुरी

Personal life
- Region: Mithila region
- Education: Ancient Mithila University
- Occupation: Philosopher

Religious life
- Religion: Hinduism
- Philosophy: Samkhya
- School: Kapil Ashram
- Creed: Shamkhya Philosophy
- Profession: Teacher

Religious career
- Teacher: Kapila
- Disciples: Panchashikha

Asuri (Sanskrit: आसुरि) was a Vedic sage in the tradition of Hinduism in the ancient Indian Subcontinent. He was the disciple of the Vedic sage Kapila. Later he became the teacher of Shamkhya philosophy founded by the sage Kapila. Shamkhya philosophy is one of the six schools of the ancient Indian philosophy.

== Description ==
According to the references of the Shankhya philosophy, Asuri was the first recipient of the Shamkhya philosophy and the second teacher after his teacher Kapila in the tradition of Shamkhya school of the Indian philosophy. He was the teacher of the sage Panchashikha. He transmitted his knowledge of the Shamkhya philosophy to his disciple Panchashikha. And then Panchashikha taught Shamkhya philosophy to his disciple Kings Janadeva Janaka and Dharmadhwaja Janaka.

In the text Bhagwat Purana, Asuri is mentioned as one of the sages who were invited at the Rajasuya Yajna organised by the King Yudhishthira at his court.

In the text Garga Samhita, there is dialogues between Lord Shiva and the sage Asuri about the Rasa-dance pastime of Lord Krishna.
