= Janadeva Janaka =

- Janaka
- Successor: Dharmadhwaja
- Born: Janadeva; Mithila region
Names
- King Janadeva Janaka
- Dynasty: Janaka
- Religion: Sanatana Hinduism

Janadeva Janaka (Sanskrit: जनदेव जनक) was the king of Mithila Kingdom in the Janaka Dynasty of Videha in the Indian Subcontinent. In the Shanti Parva of Mahabharata, Bhishma had narrated the story of King Janadeva Janaka to Dharmaraj Yudhishthira.

== Etymology ==
Janadeva is a Sanskrit compound word composed of two words Jana and Deva. Jana means people and Deva means lord. Therefore, the literal meaning of Janadeva is lord of people.

== Description ==
In Shanti Parva of Mahabharata, Bhishma told to Yudhishthira that once King Janadeva Janaka asked a philosophical question on salvation to the hundred acharyas in his court but none of them could satisfactorily answer his questions about salvation. Then a sage named as Panchashikha came to the court by chance advised the king about the means to attain salvation. The king got satisfied and impressed with the answer of the sage Panchashikha, then the king appointed the sage Panchashikha as his teacher. The sage Panchashikha taught Brahman Vidya and Shashti Tantra of the Shamkhya philosophy to the king. It is said that once Mahavishnu in the guise of a Brahmin came to the King for testing, then being pleased with the king gave him some boons.
