= Vijnanabhiksu =

Indian Hindu philosopher

Vijñānabhikṣu (also spelled Vijnanabhikshu) was a Hindu philosopher from Bihar, variously dated to the 15th or 16th century, known for his commentary on various schools of Hindu philosophy, particularly the Yoga text of Patanjali. His scholarship stated that there is a unity between Vedānta, Yoga, and Samkhya philosophies, and he is considered a significant influence on Neo-Vedanta movement of the modern era.

== Philosophy ==
Vijnanabhiksu wrote commentaries in the 16th century on three different schools of Indian philosophy: Vedānta, Sāṃkhya, and Yoga. He integrated them into a nondualism platform that draws on both the Bhedabheda and Advaita (nondualism) sub-schools of Vedanta. His integration is known as Avibhaga Advaita ("indistinguishable non-dualism"). According to Andrew Nicholson, this integration "paved the way for the work of later Hindu reformers, such as Vivekananda, Radhakrishnan, and Gandhi." He further argues that by this harmonisation of astika philosophical schools, "Vijnanabhiksu and his contemporaries" made it possible for these reformers to "enunciate a specific set of beliefs for a world religion called "Hinduism."" His sub-commentary on the Yoga Sutras, the Yogavarttika, has been an influential work.

Vijnanabhiksu regarded Yoga as the most effective means to liberation, while also recognizing paths to liberation in Vedanta and Samkhya. According to Andrew Fort, Vijnanabhiksu's commentary is Yogic Advaita, since his commentary is suffused with Advaita-influenced Samkhya-Yoga. Vijnanabhiksu discusses, adds Fort, a spiritually liberated person as a yogic jivanmukta.

Vijnanabhiksu was a staunch critic of Shankara's strict non-dualism, which he viewed as crypto-Buddhist. He reinterpreted the Brahma Sutras to reflect Samkhya's metaphysical dualism of prakrti and purusha. He taught that Brahman, characterized by pure consciousness, is the Inner Ruler (antaryamin) of both prakrti and purusha. He explained the universe's creation through maya as an evolute of the eternally real prakrti, asserting that the world is not illusory.

Vijnanabhiksu's commentary, Sāṁkhyapravacanabhāṣya, on the Samkhya Sutras challenges the traditional interpretation of the Samkhya Sutras by arguing that, contrary to appearances, Kapila actually believed in the existence of God.

== Influence ==
Nicholson notes that Vijnanabhiksu's commentary on Samkhya Sutras influenced 19th century Indologists such as H. T. Colebrooke, A. E. Gough, Paul Deussen, and Richard Karl von Garbe. He further states that late-medieval thinkers including Vijnanabhiksu "paved the way" for Neo-Vedanta. According to Nicholson, already between the twelfth and the sixteenth century,

... certain thinkers began to treat as a single whole the diverse philosophical teachings of the Upanishads, epics, Puranas, and the schools known retrospectively as the "six systems" (saddarsana) of mainstream Hindu philosophy. (Note: The tendency of "a blurring of philosophical distinctions" has also been noted by Mikel Burley.) Lorenzen locates the origins of a distinct Hindu identity in the interaction between Muslims and Hindus, and a process of "mutual self-definition with a contrasting Muslim other", which started well before 1800.

Nicholson notes that the Indian and the European thinkers who developed the term "Hinduism" in the 19th century were influenced by the late-medieval philosophers and doxographers, "primarily Vedantins", who had already begun unifying diverse Indian philosophical traditions.

== Works ==
Most of Vijñānabhikṣu's texts have yet to be edited and published in Sanskrit, let alone translated into English.

=== Major works ===
Some major texts attributed to Vijnanabhiksu include:

- Vijnanamritabhashya ("The Nectar of Knowledge Commentary", commentary on Badarayana's Brahma Sutras)
- Ishvaragitabhashya ("Commentary on the Ishvara Gita")
- Sankhyasara ("Quintessence of the Sankhya")
- Sankhyasutrabhashya ("Commentary on the Sankhya Sutras" of Kapila)
- Yogasarasamgraha ("Compendium on the Quintessence of Yoga")
- Yogabhashyavarttika ("Explanation of the Commentary on the Yoga Sutras" of Vyasa)

=== English translations ===
- Ganganatha Jha, Yogasarasamgraha of Vijnanabhiksu, New Delhi: Parimal Publications, 1995.
- José Pereira, Hindu Theology: A Reader, Garden City: Doubleday, 1976. Includes translated excerpts from Vijnanamritabhashya and Sankhyasutrabhashya.
- T. S. Rukmani, Yogavarttika of Vijnanabhiksu, New Delhi: Munshiram Manoharlal, 1981.
- Nandalal Sinha, The Samkhya Philosophy, New Delhi: Oriental Books Reprint Corporation, 1979. Contains a complete translation of Vijnanabhikshu's Sankhyasutrabhashya.
- Shiv Kumar, Samkhyasara of Vijnanabhiksu, Delhi: Eastern Book Linkers, 1988.

== See also ==
- Unifying Hinduism (book)

== Sources ==
- Burley, Mikel (2007), Classical Samkhya and Yoga: An Indian Metaphysics of Experience, Taylor & Francis
- Lorenzen, David N. (2006), Who Invented Hinduism: Essays on Religion in History, Yoda Press, ISBN 9788190227261
- Nicholson, Andrew (2007), "Reconciling Dualism and Non-Dualism: Three Arguments in Vijñānabhikṣu's Bhedābheda Vedānta", Journal of Indian Philosophy, 35 (3): 2007, pp 371–403, doi:10.1007/s10781-007-9016-6, S2CID 170439037
- Nicholson, Andrew J. (2010), Unifying Hinduism: Philosophy and Identity in Indian Intellectual History, Columbia University Press
- Daniel P. Sheridan, "Vijnanabhikshu", in Great Thinkers of the Eastern World, Ian McGready, ed., New York: HarperCollins, 1995, pp. 248–251.
