= Sulabha =

Female scholar at Ancient Mithila University

Brahmavadini Sulabha
- सुलभ

Personal life
- Parent: King Pradhāna (father)
- Era: Satya Yuga
- Region: Mithila region
- Notable idea: Liberation (Moksa)
- Known for: The debate with the King Dharmadhwaja Janaka

Religious life
- Religion: Hinduism
- Philosophy: Vedic Principles
- Creed: Vedic Tradition

Sulabha ( Sanskrit: सुलभ ) was a female ascetic who appears in the Mahabharata. She challenges king Janaka's claim of attaining liberation while being a householder as per Mokshadharma Parva Chapter 321 of Shanti Parva in Mahabharata.

The text describes her as well-versed in Yoga, an ancient Indian discipline for physical, mental, and spiritual development.

== Sulabha-Janaka dialogue ==
Sulabha was a wandering mendicant ascetic Yogini, known for having philosophical debate with the philosopher king Janaka. She challenged traditional gender roles and argued for women's equality in achieving spiritual liberation. Her story of debating King Janaka is mentioned in Mokshadharma Parva, Chapter 321 of Shanti Parva in Mahabharata. In the story Yudhishthira asked Bhishma about attaining liberation (moksa) without giving up a domestic lifestyle. Bhishma, in this connection, narrated the dialogue between King Dharmadhwaja Janaka and Brahmavadini Sulabha taken place in Satya Yuga. The dialogue of Sulabha and King Janaka is an example in the Sanatana tradition of Hinduism about attaining enlightenment while being a householder.

In the debate, Sulabha clarified that she was born Kshatriya and belonged to a royal family. She says that she was the daughter of the ascetic King Pradhāna, and remained unmarried as she was unable to find a husband to fit her. She traveled widely. While wandering in the Mithila Kingdom, she heard about King Dharmadhwaja Janaka of Mithila, who was known for his devotion to detachment and spiritual knowledge. Upon hearing of Mithila's dedication to the pursuit of attaining moksha (liberation), she desired to meet him and test his resolve. According to Mahabharata, Sulabha used her yogic powers to transform herself into a beautiful woman. Disguised as a mendicant, Sulabha met King Janaka. She approached King Janaka to test his equanimity and detachment from worldly attractions. In this debate, Sulabha challenges Janaka's distinction between him and her, stating that essentially both of them are atma (soul). She demonstrated by her own example that a woman can attain liberation on the same terms as a man. Sulabhā is notable in Indian mythology, for challenging king Janaka, who is celebrated as a man of wisdom in the Upaniṣad-s, Epics and the Purāṇa-s, in a philosophical debate. Many scholars note that Sulabha appears to the silence Janaka with her arguments, but there are more complex interpretation. Her argument contains a meta-discourse, and thus assumes significance as an important source material for the study of early history of eristics in India.
