= Tattva vision =

Subject related to ESP

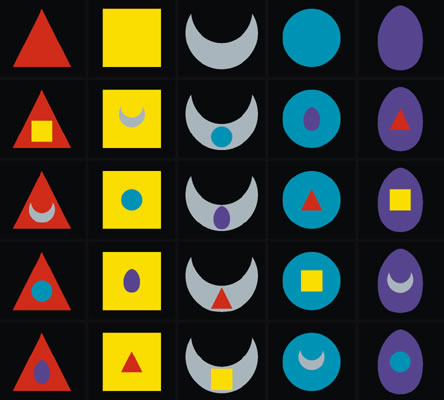
Tattvas in isolation and combination

Tattva vision is a technique developed by the Hermetic Order of the Golden Dawn to aid with the development of the faculty of astral clairvoyance. They were derived from the elements or tattvas of Hindu philosophy and the Vedantic doctrine of pancikarana, as interpreted by the Golden Dawn.

== Tattva symbols ==
The astral forms of the tattvas and equivalent in Western elements:

Tattva (Mahābhūta)	Equivalent element	Symbol	Alternative symbol	Description
Akasha	Spirit	Akasha Tattva	Akasha Tattva - Alternate	black or indigo vesica piscis or egg
Tejas	Fire	Tejas Tattva	-	red equilateral triangle
Vayu	Air	Vayu Tattva	-	blue circle
Apas	Water	Apas Tattva	Apas Tattva - Alternate	purple half circle or silver crescent
Prithvi	Earth	Prithivi Tattva	-	yellow square

== Constructing tattva cards ==
Tattva cards can be constructed by cutting the tattva symbols out of coloured paper or card, and pasting on to small cards of about 6 inches by 6 inches in size. Alternatively the tattva symbols may be painted onto the cards, or a commercial set of cards may be obtained.

== See also ==
- Zener cards
- Remote viewing
- Subtle body

== Bibliography ==
- Fletcher, Ella A., Law of the Rhythmic Breath: Teaching the Generation, Conservation, and Control of Vital Force (Kessinger, 1997) ISBN 1-56459-839-X
- Mumford, John, Magical Tattwa Cards (Llewellyn, 1997) ISBN 1-56718-472-3
- Prasad, Rama, Nature's Finer Forces: The Science of Breath and the Philosophy of the Tattvas (Kessinger, 1997) ISBN 1-56459-803-9
- Ramacharaka Yogi, Science of Breath (Kessinger, 1997) ISBN 1-56459-744-X
