= Dharmadhwaja Janaka =

- Janaka
- Successor: Kritadhvaja Janaka
- Successor: Keshidhwaja Janaka
- Born: Dharmadhwaja; Mithila region
Names
- King Dharmadhwaja Janaka
- Dynasty: Janaka
- Religion: Sanatana Hinduism

Dharmadhwaja Janaka ( Sanskrit: धर्मध्वज जनक ) was the king of the ancient Mithila or Videha Kingdom in the Indian Subcontinent. Dharmadhwaja Janaka, also known as King Janaka, was a significant figure in ancient Indian history and mythology. He was a ruler and is often remembered as a philosopher-king who was deeply engaged in spiritual and philosophical discourse. He is mentioned in the Shanti Parva of the Mahabharata. He was the student of the sage Panchashikha and learnt Shamkhya philosophy from him.

== Etymology ==
Dharmadhwaja is a Sanskrit compound word consisting of the terms Dharma and Dhvaja. The term "Dharmadhwaja" signifies a flag-bearer of Dharma, reflecting his commitment to righteousness and duty. In the lineage of the Janaka kings of Mithila, Dharmadhwaja stands out for his association with various sages and scholars of the time. His court was a hub for philosophical debates and discussions, attracting learned individuals from across the land.

== Description ==
In Narada Purana, celestial sage Sanandan had narrated the story of Dharmadhwaja Janaka having two children Amitadhwaja and Kritadhwaja. In Shanti Parva of Mahabharata, there is a famous philosophical debate between the King Dharmadhwaja Janaka with the female ascetic Vedic scholar Shulabha, the debate is known as Janaka Shulabha Samvada. It is said that when King Dharmadhwaja Janaka used anti-feminist arguments to criticise Sulabha's unconventional behaviour, then Brahmavadini Sulabha successfully established that there is no fundamental difference between a man and a woman based on the Vedic philosophical principles. She also demonstrated that a woman can attain liberation on the same level as a man by her example.
