= Panchashikha =

Philosopher of Mithila

- पञ्चशिख

Personal life
- Born: Kapileya
- Parent: (father); Kapilaa (mother)
- Region: Mithila region
- Notable work: Shashti Tantra
- Education: Sanskrit and Vedic learning in Mithila
- Occupation: Philosopher

Religious life
- Religion: Hinduism
- School: Samkhya
- Lineage: Parasharagotriya
- Profession: Acharya

Religious career
- Teacher: Asuri
- Predecessor: Asuri
- Disciples: Janadeva Janaka, Dharmadhwaja Janaka

Panchashikha (Sanskrit: पञ्चशिख, Romanised: Pañcaśikha) was a Vedic sage at the court of King Janadeva Janaka in Mithila. He was a prominent philosopher of Samkhya. He is mentioned in the Shanti Parva section of the epic text Mahabharata. He was appointed as the royal teacher of the King Janadeva Janaka in Mithila. He was also the royal teacher of the King Dharmadhwaja Janaka after the King Janadeva Janaka.

== Description ==
Panchashikha is considered as the second most important name among the authors of Sankhyashastra after the Vedic sage Kapila. He is considered to be the author of the Shashti Tantra, which is a text of the Samkhya philosophy. He is also known Parasharagotriya monk. His doctrine "Shashti Tantra" translates to "Doctrine of 60 Conception" in the Samkhya school of Indian philosophy. In the text Mahabharata, he is described as a very revered Rishi in the tradition of Samkhya school of Indian philosophy. He was said to be free from any worldly pleasures and attechments.

The royal Acharya Panchashikha at the court of the King Janaka in Mithila, is one of the most three authentic authorities of the ancient Samkhya school of the classical Indian philosophy.

== Early life ==
According to the text Mahabharata, there was a lady Brahmin named Kapilaa from whose breasts, a child was fed with milk and cherished. Since the child was cherished by the lady Kapilaa, he was called Kapileya. He later became known as Panchashikha. As he is initiated into the kinship structure, he also attains omniscience, a status equivalent to Kapila.

The shloka describing the early life of Panchashikha is

"तस्य पञ्चशिखः शिष्यो मानुष्या पयसा भृतः। ब्राह्मणी कपिला नाम काचिदासीत् कुटुम्विनी ।।"

— Veda Vyasa, Shanti Parva, Mahabharata

== Later life ==
In the text Mahabharata, Bhishma narrated the story of the sage Panchashikha to Yudhishthira. The story starts with the entry of the sage Panchashikha at the court of the King Janadeva Janaka in Mithila. According to the story, the King Janadeva Janaka was not satisfied with the knowledge of the hundred acharyas at his court, then suddenly Panchashikha arrived at the court. The king was influenced by the knowledge of the sage Panchashikha. After that the king abandoned his hundred acharyas at the court and started following the knowledge of Panchashikha. The king became his disciple. After that, the sage Panchashikha taught the knowledge of the text Samkhya Shastra to the King Janadeva Janaka.
