= Īśvarakṛṣṇa =

Author of the Samkhyakarika (fl. c. 350)

- Samkhya: Kapila
- Yoga: Patanjali
- Vaisheshika: Kaṇāda, Prashastapada
- Secular: Valluvar

Īśvarakṛṣṇa (Sanskrit: ईश्वर कृष्णः, Īśvara Kṛṣṇa, Chinese: 自在黑; pinyin: Zìzàihēi) (fl. c. 350 CE) was an Indian philosopher and sage. He was the author of Samkhyakarika (“Verses on Samkhya”), an account of the universe and its components (tattvas) according to the Samkhya school, one of the six schools of Hindu philosophy. Samkhyakarika is the earliest surviving authoritative text on classical Samkhya philosophy.

Isvara Krishna in Kārikā describes himself as laying down the essential teachings of Kapila as taught to Āsuri and by Āsuri to Pañcaśikha to himself. Samkhyakarika includes distilled statements on epistemology, metaphysics and soteriology of the Samkhya school. The text also refers to an earlier work of Samkhya philosophy called Ṣaṣṭitantra (science of sixty topics) which is now lost. The text was imported and translated into Chinese about the middle of the 6th century CE. The records of Al Biruni, the Persian visitor to India in the early 11th century, suggests Samkhyakarika was an established and definitive text in India in his times.

Samkhya philosophy is said to have inspired some early Buddhist schools, and versions of the Samkhya system are still used in many schools of Buddhism and Jainism. Samkhya is also the basis for the Yoga school. Different versions of this system are also used in Vaishnavism and Saivism.

== Sources ==
- King, Richard (1999), Indian Philosophy: An Introduction to Hindu and Buddhist Thought, Edinburgh University Press, ISBN 978-0-7486-0954-3
- Larson, Gerald James (1998), Classical Sāṃkhya: An Interpretation of Its History and Meaning, London: Motilal Banarasidass, ISBN 81-208-0503-8
