= Tattva =

Sanskrit word meaning 'thatness', 'principle', 'reality' or 'truth

According to various Indian schools of philosophy, tattvas (Sanskrit: तत्त्व) are the elements or aspects of reality that constitute human experience. In some traditions, they are conceived as an aspect of the Indian deities. Although the number of tattvas varies depending on the philosophical school, together they are thought to form the basis of all our experience. The Samkhya philosophy uses a system of 25 tattvas, while Shaivism uses a system of 36 tattvas. In Buddhism, the equivalent is the list of Abhidharma which constitute reality, as in Namarupa.

== Etymology ==
Tattva (/ˈtʌtvə/) is a Sanskrit word meaning truth.

== Hinduism ==
=== Samkhya ===
The Samkhya philosophy regards the Universe as consisting of two eternal realities: Purusha and Prakrti. It is therefore a strongly dualist philosophy. The Purusha is the centre of consciousness, whereas the Prakrti is the source of all material existence. The twenty-five tattva system of Samkhya concerns itself only with the tangible aspect of creation, theorizing that Prakrti is the source of the world of becoming. It is the first tattva and is seen as pure potentiality that evolves itself successively into twenty-four additional tattvas or principles.

=== Shaivism ===
In Shaivism, the tattvas are inclusive of consciousness as well as material existence. The 36 tattvas of Shaivism are divided into three groups:

1. Shuddha tattvas
  The first five tattvas are known as the shuddha or 'pure' tattvas. They are also known as the tattvas of universal experience.
2. Shuddha-ashuddha tattvas
  The next seven tattvas (6–12) are known as the shuddha-ashuddha or 'pure-impure' tattvas. They are the tattvas of limited individual experience.
3. Ashuddha tattvas
  The last twenty-four tattvas (13–36) are known as the ashuddha or 'impure' tattvas. The first of these is prakrti and they include the tattvas of mental operation, sensible experience, and materiality.

=== Vaishnavism ===
Within Puranic literatures and general Vaiśnava philosophy, tattva is often used to denote certain categories or types of beings or energies such as:

1. Viṣṇu-tattva
  The Supreme God Śrī Viṣnu. The causative factor of everything including other Tattvas.
2. Kṛṣṇa-tattva
  Any incarnation or expansion of Śrī Viṣnu as Śrī Kṛṣṇa.
3. Śakti-Tattva
  The multifarious energies of Śrī Viṣnu as Śrī Kṛṣṇa. It includes his internal potencies, Yogamaya, Prakṛti.
4. Jīva-tattva
  The multifarious living souls (jivas). It includes Śrī Brahmā.
5. Śiva-tattva
  Śrī Śiva is not a jiva and not a god but a personal creation of Viṣṇu as between Viṣṇu and Brahmā in qualities and powers.
6. Mahat-tattva
  The total material energy (Prakṛti) of the universe.

==== Gaudiya Vaishnavism ====
In Gaudiyā Vaiśnava philosophy, there are a total of five primary tattvas described in terms of living beings, which are collectively known as the Pancha Tattvas and described as follows:

"Spiritually there are no differences between these five tattvas, for on the transcendental platform everything is absolute. Yet there are also varieties in the spiritual world, and in order to taste these spiritual varieties one should distinguish between them".

==== Dvaita Vedanta ====
Madhvacharya categorizes all tattva, reality, into dependent and independent entities. The one independent entity is Vishnu, and all other entities depend on him for existence and operation.

=== Tantra ===
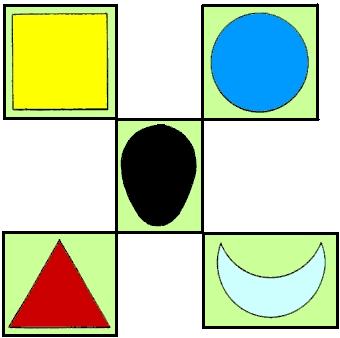
Air is blue circle. Earth is yellow square. Fire is red triangle. Water is silver crescent. Aether is the black egg.

In Hindu tantrism, there are five tattvas (pañcatattva) which create global energy cycles of tattvic tides beginning at dawn with Akasha and ending with Prithvi:

1. Akasha (Aether tattva) – symbolized by a black egg.
2. Vayu (Air tattva) – symbolized by a blue circle.
3. Agni (Fire tattva) – symbolized by a red triangle.
4. Apas (Water tattva) – symbolized by a silver crescent.
5. Prithvi (Earth tattva) – symbolized by a yellow square.

Each complete cycle lasts two hours. This system of five tattvas which each can be combined with another, was also adapted by the Golden Dawn (Tattva vision).

==== Panchatattva in Ganachakra and Pañcamakara ====
John Woodroffe (1918), affirms that the Panchamrita of Tantra, Hindu and Buddhist traditions are directly related to the mahābhūta or great elements and that the pañcamakara is actually a vulgar term for the pañcatattva and affirms that this is cognate with Ganapuja:

Worship with the Pañcatattva generally takes place in a Chakra or circle composed of men and women, Sadhakas and Sadhikas, Bhairavas and Bhairavis sitting in a circle, the Shakti being on the Sadhaka's left. Hence it is called Chakrapuja. A Lord of the Chakra (Chakreshvara) presides sitting with his Shakti in the center. During the Chakra, there is no distinction of caste, but Pashus of any caste are excluded. There are various kinds of Chakra -- productive, it is said, of differing fruits for the participator therein. As amongst Tantrik Sadhakas we come across the high, the low, and mere pretenders, so the Chakras vary in their characteristics from say the Tattva-chakra for the Brahma-kaulas, and the Bhairavi-chakra (as described in Mahanirvana, VII. 153) in which, in lieu of wine, the householder fakes milk, sugar and honey (Madhura-traya), and in lieu of sexual union does meditation upon the Lotus Feet of the Divine Mother with Mantra, to Chakras the ritual of which will not be approved such as Cudachakra, Anandabhuvana-yoga and others referred to later.

"Chakrapuja" is cognate with Ganachakra or Ganachakrapuja.

== Ayyavazhi ==
Tattvas are the 96 qualities or properties of the human body according to Akilattirattu Ammanai, the religious book of Ayyavazhi.

== Siddha medicine ==
The Siddha system of traditional medicine (Tamil: சித்த மருத்துவம், Citta maruttuvam) of ancient India was derived by the Siddhars of Tamil Nadu. According to this tradition, the human body is composed of 96 constituent principles or tattvas. Siddhas fundamental principles never differentiated people from the universe. According to them, "Nature is people and people is nature and therefore both are essentially one. People is said to be the microcosm and the Universe is Macrocosm, because what exists in the Universe exists in people."

== Jainism ==
Jain philosophy can be described in various ways, but the most acceptable tradition is to describe it in terms of the tattvas or fundamentals. Without knowing them one cannot progress towards liberation. According to the major Jain text Tattvartha Sutra, these are:

1. Jiva – Souls.
2. Ajiva – Soulless objects.
3. Asrava – Influx of karma.
4. Bandha – The bondage of karma.
5. Samvara – The stoppage of influx of karma.
6. Nirjara – Shedding of karma.
7. Moksha – Liberation.

Each one of these fundamental principles are discussed and explained by Jain scholars in depth. There are two examples that can be used to explain the above principle intuitively.

- A man rides a wooden boat to reach the other side of the river. Now the man is Jiva, the boat is ajiva. Now the boat has a leak and water flows in. That incoming of water is Asrava and accumulating there is Bandha. Now the man tries to save the boat by blocking the hole. That blockage is Samvara and throwing the water outside is Nirjara. Now the man crosses the river and reaches his destination, Moksha.
- Consider a family living in a house. One day, they were enjoying a fresh cool breeze coming through their open doors and windows of the house. However, the weather suddenly changed to a terrible dust storm. The family, realizing the storm, closed the doors and windows. But, by the time they could close all the doors and windows some of the dust had been blown into the house. After closing the doors and the windows, they started clearing the dust that had come in to make the house clean again.

This simple scenario can be interpreted as follows:

1. Jivas are represented by the living people.
2. Ajiva is represented by the house.
3. Asrava is represented by the influx of dust.
4. Bandha is represented by the accumulation of dust in the house.
5. Samvara is represented by the closing of the doors and windows to stop the accumulation of dust.
6. Nirjara is represented by the cleaning up of already collected dust from the house.
7. Moksha is represented by the cleaned house, which is similar to the shedding off all karmic particles from the soul.

== Buddhism ==
In Buddhism, the term "dhamma" is being used for the constitutional elements. Early Buddhist philosophy used several lists, such as namarupa and the five skandhas, to analyse reality. The Theravada Abhidhamma tradition elaborated on these lists, using over 100 terms to analyse reality.

== See also ==
- Mahābhūta
- Pancha Bhuta
- Achintya Bheda Abheda
- Tattva vision
- Tat Tvam Asi
- Tathatā (Buddhism)

== Sources ==
- Jain, Vijay K. (2011), Acharya Umasvami's Tattvārthsūtra, Vikalp Printers, ISBN 978-81-903639-2-1, "Non-Copyright"
- Osto, Douglas (January 2018), "No-Self in Sāṃkhya: A Comparative Look at Classical Sāṃkhya and Theravāda Buddhism", Philosophy East and West, 68 (1): 201–222, doi:10.1353/pew.2018.0010, S2CID 171859396
- Prasad, Ram (1997). Nature's Finer Forces: The Science of Breath and the Philosophy of the Tattvas. Kessinger. ISBN 1-56459-803-9
- Ramacharaka Yogi (1997). Science of Breath. Kessinger. ISBN 1-56459-744-X
- Singh, Jaideva (1979). Siva Sutras: The Yoga of Supreme Identity. Delhi: Motilal Banarsidas.
- Avalon, Arthur (Sir John Woodroffe) (1918). Shakti and Shâkta. Full text available online: (accessed: Monday July 9, 2007)
