= Prakriti =

Nature in Hinduism

Prakriti (Sanskrit: प्रकृति IAST: Prakṛti) is "the original or natural form or condition of anything, original or primary substance". It is a key concept in Hinduism, formulated by the Samkhya school, where it does not refer merely to matter or nature, but includes all cognitive, moral, psychological, emotional, sensorial and physical aspects of reality. Prakriti has three different innate qualities (guṇas), whose equilibrium is the basis of all empirical reality, which is in the form of the pancha bhutas (five basic elements) – Akasha, Vayu, Agni, Jala, and Prithvi. Prakriti contrasts with Puruṣa, which is pure awareness and metaphysical consciousness. The term is also found in the texts of other Indian religions such as Jainism and Buddhism.

== Etymology and meaning ==
Prakriti (Sanskrit: प्रकृति) is an early Indic concept meaning "making or placing before or at first, the original or natural form or condition of anything, original or primary substance". The term is discussed by Yāska (~600 BCE) in Nirukta, and is found in numerous Hindu texts. It connotes "nature, body, matter, phenomenal universe" in Hindu texts.

According to Dan Lusthaus,

In Sāṃkhya puruṣa signifies the observer, the 'witness'. Prakṛti includes all the cognitive, moral, psychological, emotional, sensorial and physical aspects of reality. It is often mistranslated as 'matter' or 'nature' – in non-Sāṃkhyan usage it does mean 'essential nature' – but that distracts from the heavy Sāṃkhyan stress on prakṛti's cognitive, mental, psychological and sensorial activities. Moreover, subtle and gross matter are its most derivative byproducts, not its core. Only prakṛti acts.

Prakriti has three different innate qualities (guṇas), whose equilibrium is the basis of all empirical reality, which is in the form of the pancha bhutas (five basic elements) – Akasha, Vayu, Agni, Jala, and Prithvi. Prakriti contrasts with Puruṣa, which is pure awareness and metaphysical consciousness. The term is also found in the texts of other Indian religions such as Jainism and Buddhism.

In epic texts, avyakta, literally unmanifest, can mean an attribute of the supreme being, the cause of creation, or a synonym of prakriti. In Samkhya texts, brahman has been interpreted as a synonym for prakriti as that from which all manifest beings are produced.

== Pancha Prakriti ==
In Indian languages derived from Sanskrit roots, Prakriti refers to the feminine aspect of all life forms. A woman can be seen as a symbol of Prakriti.

According to Sanskrit scriptures, Brahma Vaivarta Purana, five Hindu goddesses are considered as the complete feminine personification of Prakriti – Saraswati, Lakshmi, Parvati, Gayatri and Radha. Together these five goddesses are worshiped as Pancha Prakriti.

== Samkhya ==
Elements in Samkhya philosophy

In Samkhya philosophy, the term prakriti is used in three distinct ways. Prakriti sometimes refers specifically to Mula-Prakriti (root-nature), also known as the unmanifest (avyakta) or the principal (pradhana), which is the fundamental, uncaused source of the material world. When paired with vikriti (modification), prakriti signifies "source", Mula-Prakriti is only prakriti, while the intellect, ego, and five sense qualities are both prakriti and vikriti, forming the eight prakritis. Prakriti can also refer to the entire twenty-four tattvas (elements), encompassing both unmanifest and manifest.

Samkhya texts contrast Prakriti with Purusha (spirit, consciousness) where Prakriti refers to "the material world, nature, matter, physical and psychological character, constitution, temper, disposition". According to Knut Jacobsen, in the dualistic system of the Samkhya school, "Purusha is the principle of pure consciousness, while Prakriti is the principle of matter", where Purusha is the conscious witness in every living being, while Prakriti is the manifest world.

While the version of classical Samkhya that became authoritative posits a single prakriti, some texts assert multiple prakritis, one per each purusa.

Both the Bhagavad Gita and the Samkhya school of philosophy posit that prakṛti is composed of the three guṇas: sattva (preservation), rajas (creation), and tamas (destruction). Sattva encompasses qualities of goodness, light, and harmony. Rajas is associated with concepts of energy, activity, and passion; so that, depending on how it is used, it can either have a supportive or hindering effect on the evolution of the soul. Tamas is commonly associated with inertia, darkness, insensitivity. Souls who are more Tamasic are considered imbued in darkness and take the longest to reach liberation.

In Samkhya, prakriti, comprising the three gunas, exists in equilibrium before the cosmos manifests, neutralizing each other's properties. Samkhya argues that the complex and purposeful nature of the world suggests that it exists for the sake of something else, particularly the conscious souls. This view suggests that prakriti, though unconscious, serves to aid the liberation of the soul, similar to how milk nourishes a calf.

== Yoga Sutras ==
In the Yoga Sutras of Patanjali, prakriti is described as encompassing the entire cosmos including its physical aspects. It is characterized by the three gunas - sattva, rajas, and tamas. However, the emphasis within the text primarily is on the psychological manifestations of these guṇas. Sattva, the purest guna, is associated with qualities like lucidity, tranquility, wisdom, discrimination, detachment, happiness, and peacefulness when expressed in the mind (citta). Rajas is characterized by traits like hankering, power, and various forms of movement and creative activity. Tamas is marked by qualities such as ignorance, delusion, lethargy, and disinclination toward constructive activity. These psychological attributes reveal the nature of the gunas in Yoga.

== Bhagavad Gita ==
The Bhagavad Gita emphasizes the role of prakriti as the material energy of the universe, created and controlled by God (Krishna), and its distinction from purusha in different verses. In Chapter 4 verse 6, Krishna describes prakriti as His own power, through which He manifests in the world. In Chapter 7 verse 4 and 5, Krishna mentions two types of prakriti:

Earth, water, fire, air, space, mind, intellect, and the sense of ego comprise the eight component parts of my energy known as prakriti. This is the inferior prakriti, but you should also know about my higher prakriti, which is distinct from it. This is the element of life, O mighty one, the jiva bhuta, by means of which this world is held in place.

— Bhagavad Gita, Chapter 7, verse 4-5

In Chapter 13 verses 19–23, Krishna discusses the eternal nature of both prakriti and purusha, as well as their distinction.

You should understand that both prakriti (matter) and purusha (spirit) have no beginning. You should also know that all transformations and the gunas have their origin in prakriti.

— Bhagavad Gita, Chapter 13, verse 19

It is described in the Bhagavad Gita as the "primal motive force". It is the essential constituent of the universe and is at the basis of all the activity of the creation.

== Vedanta ==
In Vishishtadvaita Vedanta, a sub-school of Indian philosophy, Prakṛti is one of the six substances (dravya). The guṇas (qualities) are the attributes of primordial Nature (Prakṛti), and not its constituents, unlike Sāṅkhya. These qualities are inseparable from Prakṛti, but not identical with it and inextricably related to Ishvara. Prakṛti in Vishishtadvaita Vedanta is limited above by the eternal manifestation (nityavibhuti) whereas it's infinite in Sāṅkhya.

According to Dvaita Vedanta, Prakṛti is the material cause (Satkaryavada) of the world.

Prakriti is closely associated with the concept of Maya within Hindu texts more broadly.

== Jainism ==
In Jainism the term "Prakriti" is used in its theory of Karma, and is considered "that form of matter which covers the perfections of the soul (jiva) and prevents its liberation".

== See also ==
- Purusha – Concept in Hindu philosophy
- Akasha – Term for space or æther
- Dvaita Vedanta – School of thought in Hinduism
- Shakti – Divine feminine energy in Hinduism
- Ammavaru – Hindu goddess
