= Purusha =

Concept in Hindu philosophy

Purusha (Sanskrit: पुरुष, IAST: Puruṣa) is a concept in Vedic theology and Indian philosophy, variously referring the cosmic being or self, awareness, and universal principle.

In one of many creation myths of the early Vedas, Purusha was a cosmic being whose sacrifice by the gods created all life. In the Upanishads, the Purusha concept refers to the abstract essence of the Self, Spirit and the Universal Principle that is eternal, indestructible, without form, and all-pervasive.

In Samkhya philosophy, Purusha is the plural immobile cosmic principle, pure consciousness, unattached and unrelated to anything, which is "nonactive, unchanging, eternal, and pure". Purusha uniting with Prakṛti (matter) gives rise to life.

In Kashmir Shaivism, Purusha is enveloped in five sheaths: time (kāla), desire (raga), restriction (niyati), knowledge (vidyā) and separatedness (kalā); it is the universal Self (paramātman) under limitations as many individual Selfs (jīvātman).

== Definition and general meaning ==
There is no consensus among schools of Hinduism on the definition of Purusha, and it is left to each school and individual to reach their own conclusions. For example, one of many theistic traditions script such as Kapilasurisamvada, credited to another ancient Hindu philosopher named Kapila, first describes Purusha in a manner similar to Samkhya-Yoga schools, but then proceeds to describe buddhi (intellect) as second Purusha, and ahamkara (egoism) as the third Purusha. Such pluralism and diversity of thought within Hinduism implies that the term Purusha is a complex term with diverse meanings.

The animating causes, fields, and principles of nature are Purusha in Hindu philosophy. Hinduism refers to Purusha as the soul of the universe, the universal spirit present everywhere, in everything and everyone, all the time. Purusha is the Universal Principle that is eternal, indestructible, without form, and all-pervasive. It is Purusha in the form of nature’s laws and principles that operate in the background to regulate, guide, and direct change, evolution, cause, and effect. It is Purusha, in the Hindu concept of existence, that breathes life into matter, is the source of all consciousness, one that creates oneness in all life forms, in all of humanity, and the essence of Self. According to Hinduism, it is Purusha why the universe operates, is dynamic and evolves, as against being static.

== Vedas ==
During the Vedic period, the Purusha concept was one of several mythemes offered for the creation of the universe. (Note: An example of an alternate mytheme is Nasadiya Sukta, the last book of the Vedas, which suggests a great heat created universe from void. See: Klaus K. Klostermair (2007), A survey of Hinduism, 3rd Edition, State University of New York Press, ISBN 978-0-7914-7081-7, pp 88) Purusa, in the Rigveda, was described as a being who becomes a sacrificial offering of the devatas who sacrifices himself to his own self, and whose sacrifice creates all life forms including human beings.

In the Rigveda, "Puruṣa is all that yet hath been and all that is to be" (पुरुष एवेदगं सर्वं यद्भूतं यच्च भव्यम्।).

=== Varna system ===
In the Purusha Sukta, the 90th hymn of the 10th book of the Rigveda, varna is portrayed as a result of human beings created from different parts of the body of the divinity Purusha. This Purusha Sukta verse is controversial and is believed by many scholars, such as Max Müller, to be a corruption and medieval or modern era insertion into Veda, because unlike all other major concepts in the Vedas including those of Purusha, the four varnas are never mentioned anywhere else in any of the Vedas, and because this verse is missing in some manuscript prints found in different parts of India.

That remarkable hymn (the Purusha Sukta) is in language, metre, and style, very different from the rest of the prayers with which it is associated. It has a decidedly more modern tone, and must have been composed after the Sanskrit language had been refined.

— Henry Thomas Colebrooke,

There can be little doubt, for instance, that the 90th hymn of the 10th book (Purusha Sukta) is modern both in its character and in its diction. (...) It mentions the three seasons in the order of the Vasanta, spring; Grishma, summer; and Sarad, autumn; it contains the only passage in the Rigveda where the four castes are enumerated. The evidence of language for the modern date of this composition is equally strong. Grishma, for instance, the name for the hot season, does not occur in any other hymn of the Rigveda; and Vasanta also does not belong to the earliest vocabulary of the Vedic poets.

— Max Müller,

The Purusha Sukta is a later interpolation in the Rig Veda. (...) Verses in the form of questions about the division of Purusha and the origins of the Varnas are a fraudulent emendation of the original.

— Babasaheb Ambedkar,

== Upanishads ==
The abstract idea of Purusha is extensively discussed in various Upanishads, and referred interchangeably as Paramatman and Brahman (not to be confused with Brahmin). In the Upanishads and later texts of Hindu philosophy, the Purusha concept moved away from the Vedic definition of Purusha and was no longer a person, cosmic man or entity. Instead, the concept flowered into a more complex abstraction:

Splendid and without a bodily form is this Purusha, without and within, unborn, without life breath and without mind, higher than the supreme element. From him are born life breath and mind. He is the soul of all beings.

— Munduka Upanishad, (Translated by Klaus Klostermair)

In the Upanishads, the Purusha concept refers to the abstract essence of the Self, Spirit and the Universal Principle that is eternal, indestructible, without form and is all-pervasive. The Purusha concept is explained with the concept of Prakrti in the Upanishads. The Universe is envisioned in these ancient Sanskrit texts as a combination of the perceivable material reality and non-perceivable, non-material laws and principles of nature. Material reality (or Prakrti) is everything that has changed, can change and is subject to cause and effect. Purusha is the universal principle that is unchanging, uncaused but is present everywhere and the reason why Prakrti changes, transforms and transcends all of the time and which is why there is cause and effect.

Rishi Angiras of the Atma Upanishad , belonging to the Atharvaveda explains that Purusha, the dweller in the body, is three-fold: the Bahyatman (the Outer-Atman) which is born and dies; the Antaratman (the Inner-Atman) which comprehends the whole range of material phenomena, gross and subtle, with which the Jiva concerns himself; and the Paramatman which is all-pervading, unthinkable, indescribable, is without action and has no Samskaras.

== In Samkhya and Yoga ==
Both Samkhya, a school of Hindu philosophy that considers reason, as against Nyaya school's logic or Mīmāṃsā school's tradition, as the proper source of knowledge, and Yoga philosophy state that there are two ultimate realities whose interaction accounts for all experiences and universe, namely Purusha (spirit) and Prakrti (matter). The universe is envisioned as a combination of perceivable material reality and non-perceivable, non-material laws and principles of nature. Material reality, or Prakrti, is everything that has changed, can change and is subject to cause and effect. Universal principle, or Purusha, is that which is unchanging (aksara) and is uncaused.

Puruṣa is the transcendental self or pure consciousness. It is absolute, independent, free, imperceptible, unknowable through other agencies, above any experience by mind or senses and beyond any words or explanations. It remains pure, "nonattributive consciousness". Puruṣa is neither produced nor does it produce. It is held that unlike Advaita Vedanta and like Purva-Mīmāṃsā, Samkhya believes in a plurality of the puruṣas.

Yoga philosophy holds that, in addition to the purusha of each individual, there is a special purusha called Ishvara, which is free of all kleshas and karmas.

Both Samkhya and Yoga school holds that the path to moksha (release, Self-realization) includes the realization of Purusha.

== Puranas ==
In the Puranas, "The Bhagavata Purana and the Mahabharata boldly proclaim Vishnu as ultimate Purusha described in Purusha Sukta prayer", whereas Shiva is described as ultimate Purusha (cosmic male) in Shiva Purana. According to Indologist W. Norman Brown, "The verses of Purusha Sukta are definitely a reference to Vishnu, who, through his three steps, is all-pervading (i.e. he spreads in all directions)".

The Bhagavata Purana explains the origin of the four varnas from the body of Purusha, identified as Vishnu:

Oh leader of Kurus! From the mouth of the Puruṣa came forth Brahman (the Veda) and the Brāhmaṇa class like syllables coming out from the mouth (head). Hence the Brāhmaṇa Varṇa became the foremost among the Varṇas.

From his arms emanated the power of protection and the Kṣatriya class who follows that vow, viz. the duty of protecting the world. This class born from Puruṣa (Lord Viṣṇu) protects the classes of people from wounds (i.e. injuries or troubles) caused by thorns (in the form of miscreants).

From the thighs of that All-pervading Lord were born the vocations like agriculture which maintain the livelihood of the public. The Vaiśya class, born from the same part of the body, carries out trades and agriculture for the maintenance of people.

From the feet of the Lord was born to service for the achievement of religion. Formerly the Śūdra class was born for the sake of service, whereby Hari is pleased.

— Bhagavata Purana, Book 3, Chapter 6

== Vedanta ==
=== Bhagavad Gita ===
In the Bhagavad Gita, purusha is used to refer to Supreme Being in several instances:

That Supreme Being (purusha), Partha, is attained by undivided devotion. The living beings are situated within him and he pervades this entire world.

— Bhagavad Gita, Chapter 8, verse 22

Arjuna refers to Krishna as purusha in several verses, such as Chapter 10 verse 12, Chapter 11 verse 18, Chapter 11 verse 38.

You are the Supreme Brahman, the supreme abode and the supreme purifier. You are the eternal divine purusha, the primordial Deity, unborn and all-pervading.

— Bhagavad Gita, Chapter 10, verse 12

In Chapter 15 verse 16 Krishna refers to two types of purushas: kshara (perishable), akshara (imperishable). In verse 17, he identifies himself as "highest purusha" (paramatman), superior to both kshara and akshara.

=== Brahma Sutras ===
The Brahma Sutra 1.2.13 references Chandogya Upanishad 4.15.1, which describes the purusha that is seen in the eye:

The teacher said: "The person seen in the eyes is the Self. It is immortal and fearless. It is Brahman. This is why, if anyone puts clarified butter or water in the eyes, it goes to the corners of the eyes".

— Chandogya Upanishad 4.15.1

The Brahma Sutra 1.2.13 clarifies that this person is the highest self, Brahman:

(The Person) within the eye (is the highest Self) on account of suitability.

— Brahma Sutra 1.2.13

== See also ==
- Cosmic Man
- Prakṛti
- Brahman
- Hindu deities
- Hindu idealism
- Hindu mythology
- Indian caste system
- Kingu
- Pangu
- Spirit
- Vishnu
- Adam Kadmon
- Adam kasia
- Akal Purakh
- Purusha Sukta
- Ymir

== Sources ==
- Rosen, Steven (2006), Essential Hinduism, Greenwood Publishing Group, ISBN 978-0275990060
- Sharma, C. (1997), A Critical Survey of Indian Philosophy, New Delhi: Motilal Banarsidass Publ, ISBN 81-208-0365-5, archived from the original on 2005-11-01 – via Questia
- Sutton, Nicholas (2016). Bhagavad-Gita. Oxford Centre for Hindu Studies. ISBN 978-1-366-61059-1.
- Grimes, John A. (1996). A Concise Dictionary of Indian Philosophy: Sanskrit Terms Defined in English. State University of New York Press. ISBN 0791430677.
