= Bhadreshdas Swami =

Indian monk and Sanskrit scholar (born c. 1966)

Mahamahopadhyaya Bhadreshdas Swami
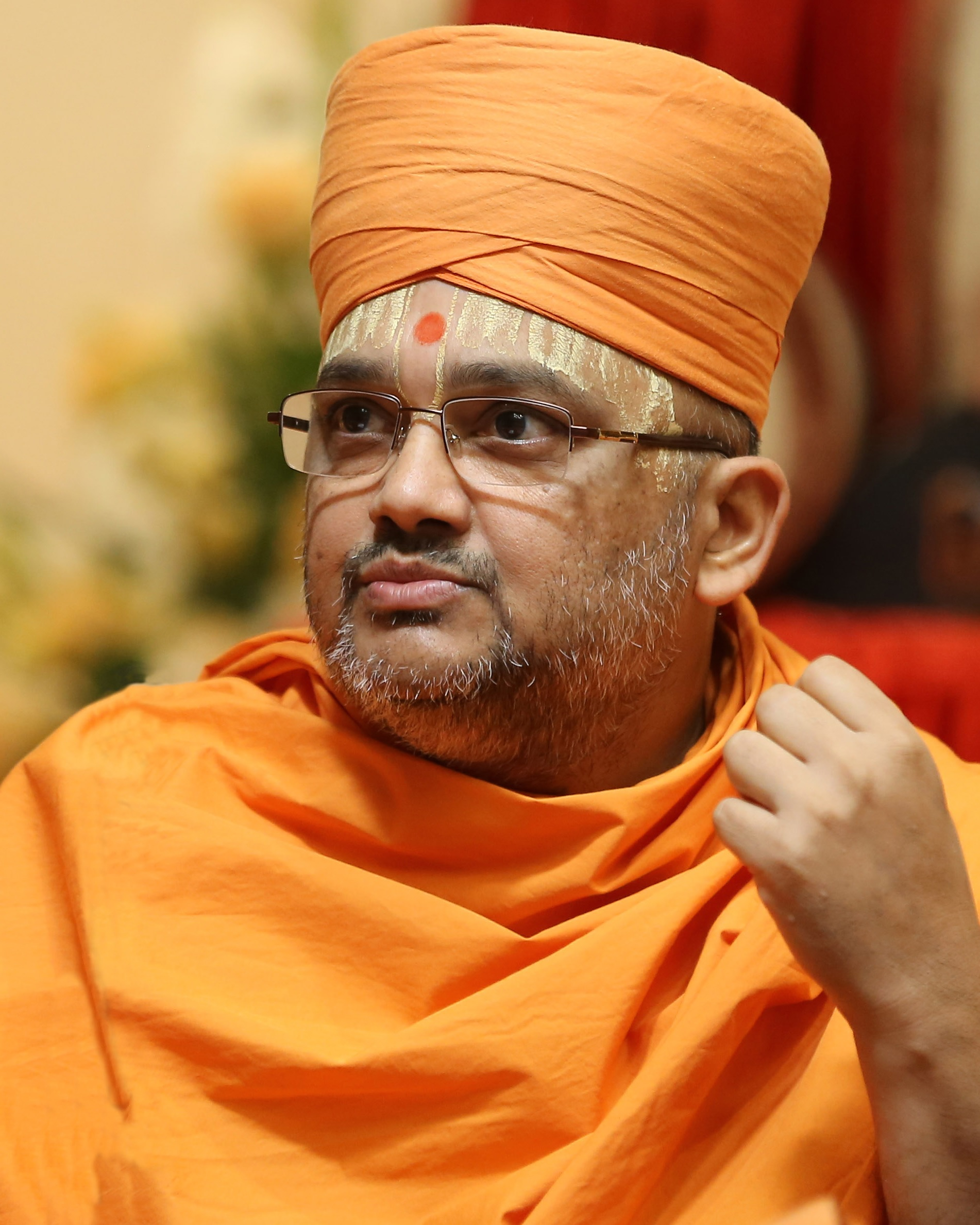
- Born: c. 1966; India
- Awards: Saraswati Samman (2024)
- Honours: Darshankesari, Vedant Martand (Silpakorn University), Abhinav Bhashyakar (Somnath Sanskrit University), Mahamahopadhyaya, Vedant Prakash (Kavikulaguru Kalidas Sanskrit University)

Education
- Education: Ph.D., D. Litt.
- Alma mater: Karnataka University; Sampurnanand Sanskrit University (Benaras); Bharatiya Vidya Bhavan (Mumbai)

Philosophical work
- School: Swaminarayan Hinduism
- Institutions: BAPS Swaminarayan Research Institute, New Delhi. BAPS Swaminarayan Sanskrit Mahavidyalaya and Yagnapurush Sanskrit Pathshala, Sarangpur, Gujarat
- Notable works: Swaminarayan Bhashyam, Swaminarayan Siddhanta Sudha
- Website: www.baps.org

Mahamahopadhyaya Bhadreshdas Swami is a Sanskrit scholar and an ordained monk of the Bochasanwasi Akshar Purushottam Swaminarayan Sanstha (BAPS). In 2007 he completed the Swaminarayan Bhashyam, a five-volume classical Sanskrit commentary on the Prasthanatrayi. This commentary on three of Hinduism's most notable texts: the Upanishads, Bhagavad Gita, and the Brahma sutras, forms the interpretive foundation of the philosophy of Akshar Purushottam darshana, also known as Swaminarayan darshana, illuminating the Vedic roots of the Akshar Purushottama philosophy, which was propagated by the 19th-century Hindu leader, Swaminarayan and later by Shastriji Maharaj.

The commentary discusses the basis of the five "eternal entities" - Jiva, Ishwar, Maya, Brahma and Parabrahman - as expounded by Swaminarayan. It also expands on the concept of Aksharbrahma and Parabrahman as well as the attainment of liberation (moksha) through devotion (bhakti) and worship (upasana). Following the tradition of the classical Sanskrit commentaries by Shankaracharya, Ramanujacharya, and Madhvacharya, the Swaminarayan Bhashyam is the second classical Sanskrit commentary on the entire Prasthanatrayi to have been completed by anyone in the last several centuries.

After receiving a Ph.D. in Sanskrit from Karnakata University in 2005, he was awarded a D. Litt. in 2010 and the Mahamahopadhyaya honorific by Kavikulaguru Kalidas Sanskrit University in Nagpur, India. The University of Mysore also awarded him the "Professor G.M. Memorial Award" and the "Darshankesari award" in 2013 for his work on Swaminarayan Vedanta. He currently serves as the head scholar ("Pradhānācārya") of the Yagnapurush Sanskrit Pathshala in Sarangpur, Gujarat, where the students are instructed by him in philosophy, nyaya darśana, vedas, the Paninian grammar of Sanskrit and Indian classical music.

== Early life ==
Bhadreshdas Swami was initiated as a renunciant (swami) of the BAPS Swaminarayan Sanstha by his guru Pramukh Swami Maharaj in 1981 at the age of 14, Afterwards, he attended the BAPS seminary for swamis in Sarangpur, Gujarat, where he learned Swaminarayan Vedanta as well as the philosophical system of logic (nyaya) and Sanskrit grammar (vyakaran).

== Education ==
Bhadreshdas Swami received five M.A. degrees in Sanskrit and Shad Darshanas from Sampurnanand Sanskrit University, in Benaras, India, and Bharatiya Vidya Bhavan in Mumbai, India in 1996. In 2005, he received his Ph.D. from Karnataka University, based on his dissertation on the Bhagavad Gita.

== Scholarly work ==
Bhadreshdas Swami has conducted extensive research on the Upanishads and the Bhagavad Gita. He was a project committee member of the Maharshi Sandipani Rashtriya Ved-vidya Pratishthan (MSRVVP). He also serves as an advisor to students of Sanskrit and Hindu philosophy in his roles as a professor at the BAPS Swaminarayan Research Institute in New Delhi, and Shree Somnath Sanskrit University in Veraval, Gujarat. Bhadreshdas Swami also serves as the head scholar at the Yagnapurush Sanskrit Pathshala in Sarangpur, Gujarat, where he instructs students in philosophy, Nyaya Darshana, Vedas, the Paninian grammar of Sanskrit and Indian classical music composed for the tabla, flute and violin. His administrative roles include service on the managing committee of the BAPS Swaminarayan Research Institute at Akshardham in New Delhi. He is currently writing commentaries on the Vedas.

=== Swaminarayan Bhashyam ===
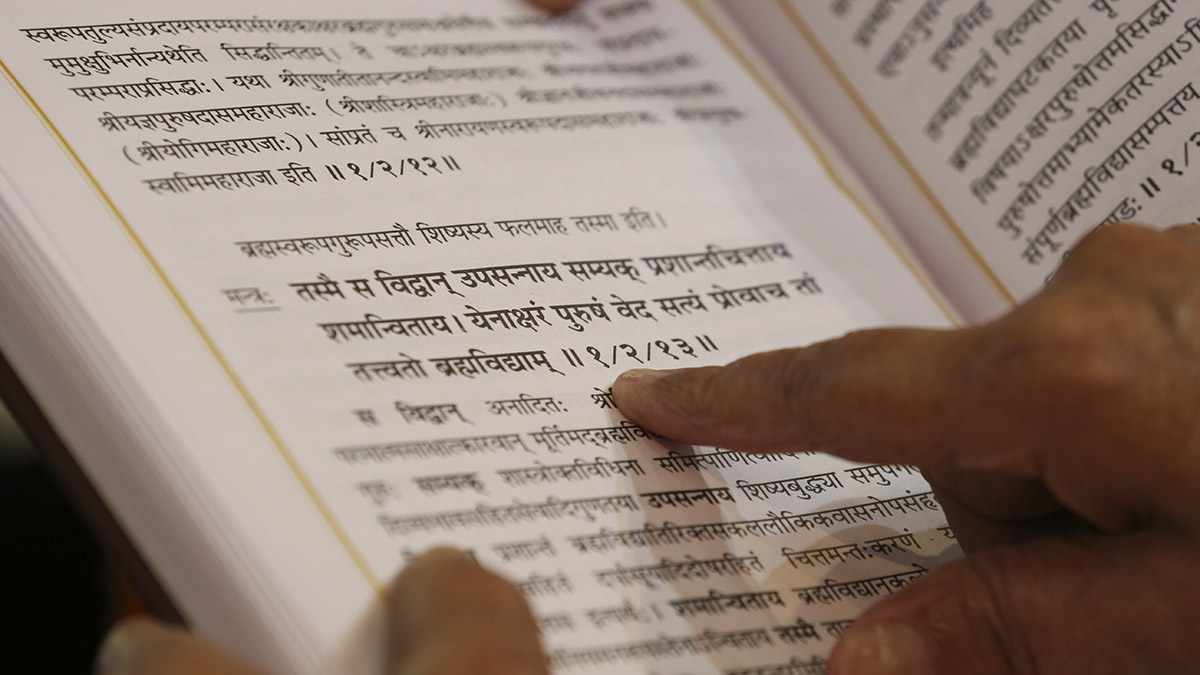
Swaminarayan Bhashyam

The Swaminarayan Bhashyam is a commentary (or bhashya), on the ten Upanishads, the Bhagavad Gita and the Brahma sutras, which are collectively referred to as the prasthanatrayi (three sources). It is composed in the traditional commentarial style of the classical Sanskrit commentaries written by Shankaracharya, Ramanujacharya, and Madhvacharya. Just as these commentaries establish the vedantic schools of thought of their respective acharyas, the Swaminarayan Bhashyam elaborates Swaminarayan's philosophical principles seen in the Upanishads, the Bhagavad Gita and the Brahma sutras.

The commentary is the first of its scope written in the 21st century. Through a careful study of every verse (shloka) in the three sources, it establishes a basis for the five "eternal realities" expounded by Swaminarayan in the Vachanamrut, namely: Jiva (soul/life), Ishwar (deity), Maya, Aksharbrahma (Brahman) and Parabrahman (Parabrahman). It clarifies the relationship of Aksharbrahman to Parabrahman and Swaminarayan's principle for attaining liberation through the practice of bhakti and upasana.

==== Creation of the Swaminarayan Bhashyam ====
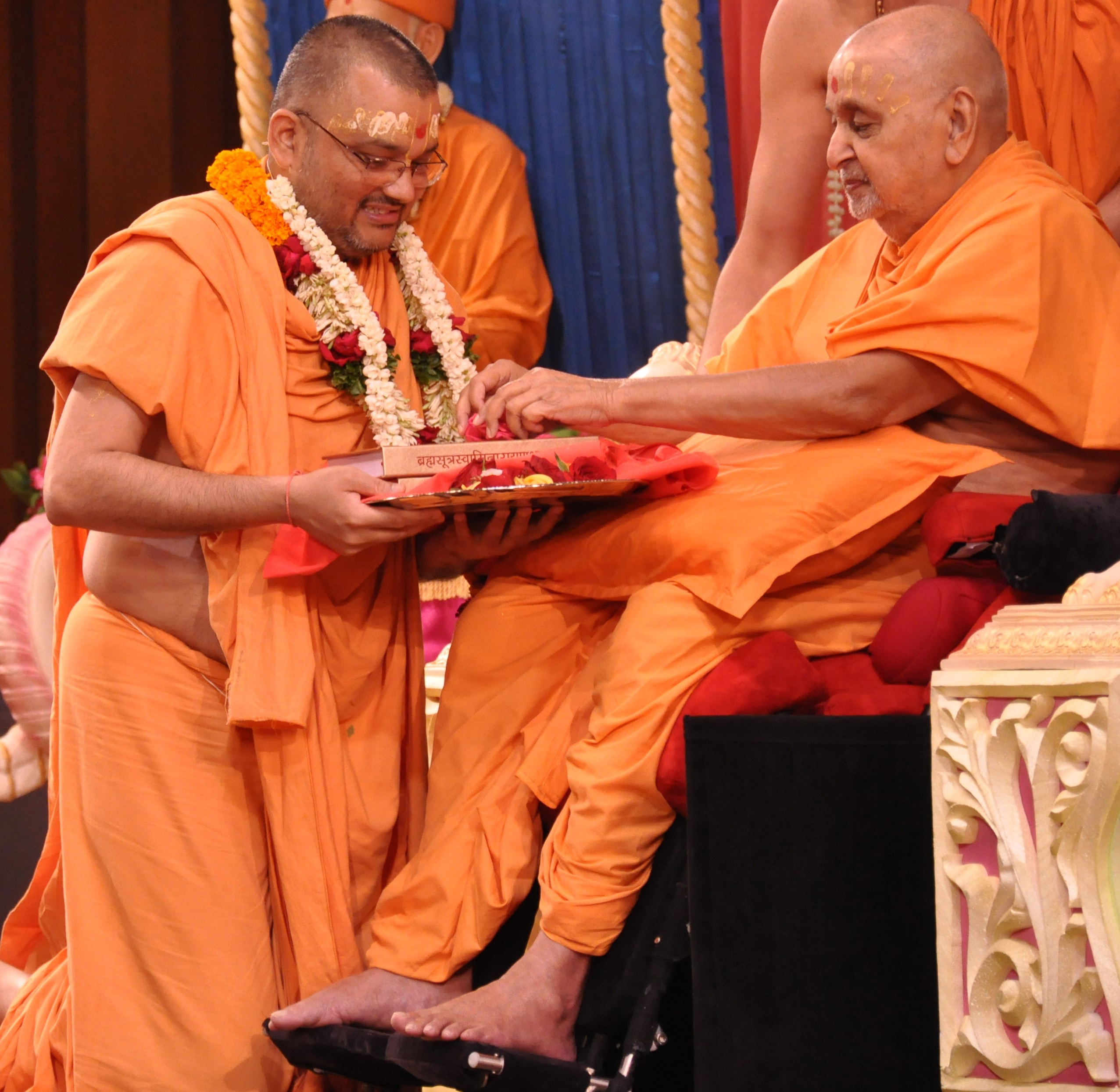
Bhadreshdas Swami presenting the Swaminarayan Bhashyam to Pramukh Swami Maharaj

After earning his doctorate in Sanskrit, Bhadreshdas Swami was asked by his guru, Pramukh Swami Maharaj in 2005 to write a Sanskrit commentary on the Prasthanatrayi. Bhadreshdas worked on the commentary in a small room located in the basement of the BAPS seminary of Sarangpur, Gujarat, India. In June 2007, the village of Sarangpur was struck by a flash flood, inundating his workspace and resulting in the loss of approximately 2500 pages of his original work and notes. These notes contained information regarding the acharyas' arguments and definitions of philosophical components and the initial chapters of the Brahmasutra Bhashyam. His deadline for completing the Bhashyam, the centenary celebration of the BAPS Swaminarayan Sanstha in December 2007, was six months away but his original work was unsalvageable. With the deadline fast approaching, Pramukh Swami Maharaj gave Bhadreshdas Swami blessings to start over. Working approximately 20 hours per day, he completed the Swaminarayan Bhashyam on schedule. On 17 December 2007, at the BAPS Centenary Celebrations in Ahmedabad, Bhadreshdas presented the completed five-volume 2,150-page work to his guru.

==== Critical reception ====
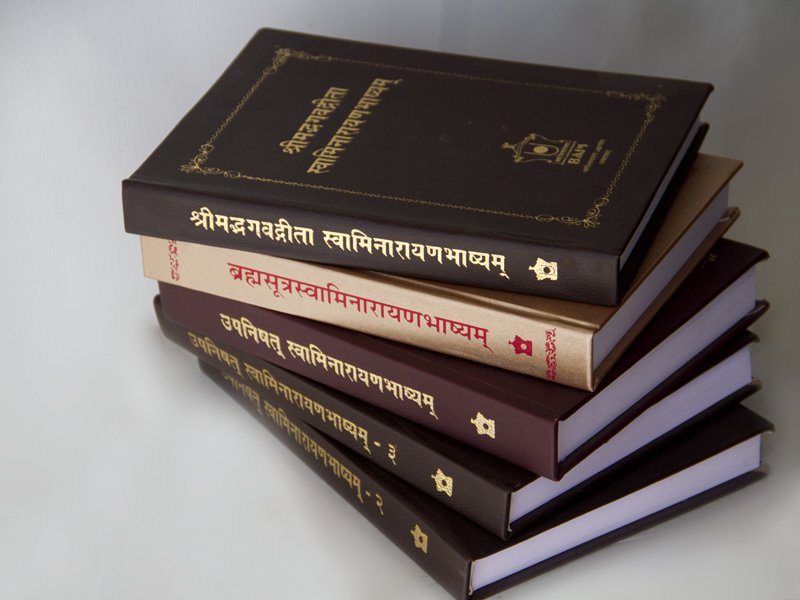
Swaminarayan Bhashyam

The work has since been regarded by scholars of Indian philosophy as a significant commentary in the Prasthantrayi commentary tradition. Philosophy professor S.P. Dubey from the University of Jabalpur considers it to be the fifteenth major commentary in the tradition of Brahmasutra commentaries, which dates back to Shankaracharya (788-820 CE).

Krishnamurti Shastri from the Maharshi Sandipani Rashtriya Veda Vidya Pratishthan of India says that the "poetic commentary presents new insights into the secrets of Vedanta in comparison to any previous views on the subject".

N. Radhakrishna Bhat, Sanskrit professor at the Karnataka State Open University, has stated, "By reading this commentary we will come to the conclusion that the Swaminarayan tradition is an independent one on Akshar Purushottama Siddhanta based on the Vedic tradition which is quite ancient. It is quite a different one and has its own specialty. It greatly differs from Ramanuja's Vishishtadvaita, Vallabhadeva's Suddhadvaita and the philosophy of Madhva, Nimbarka etc. It brings out greatly the special features and principles of the Siddhanta very effectively… in accordance to the eternal Vedic principles conveyed by Bhagwan Shri Swaminarayana and the enlightened Guruparampara."

V.S. Vishnu Potty, of the Department of Sanskrit and Indian Culture at the Sri Chandrasekharendra Saraswathi Viswa Mahavidyalaya, states that "this new interpretation opens our eyes to a new horizon in this field of knowledge, in an objective manner."

The dean of the Arts faculty at the University of Delhi has stated that "This volume is prepared in faultless Sanskrit and a lucid style. Swaminarayan Bhashya is really a distinct contribution through a fresh approach to the old Brahmasutra commentaries...It is my sincere opinion that the BrahmaSutra Swaminarayan Bhashya is a well-researched work. I believe, Brahmasutra Swaminarayan Bhashya will be an important addition to the field of Vedanta philosophy and will be warmly received in India and abroad."

The work was also added into the Library of Congress by Democratic whip Steny Hoyer. During this ceremony, Hoyer said that "Surely these commentaries written by [Bhadreshdas Swami] will bring peace and blessings to the millions who will read and benefit from them".

==== Acclamation by Shri Kashi Vidvat Parisad ====
On 31 July 2017, Bhadreshdas Swami and his work on the Swaminarayan-Siddhant-Sudha was acknowledged by the Shri Kashi Vidvat Parisad. Throughout India, the Shri Kashi Vidvat Parisad is an authoritative council on all matters pertaining to Vedic dharma and philosophy.

The council's gathering was marked by four declarations:

First, that the Prasthanatrayi Swaminarayan Bhashyam and the Swaminarayan-Sidhhant-Sudha are sacred texts on Parabrahman Swaminarayan's revealed Akshar Purshottam Darshana; and that these sacred texts are in every manner the protectors of the eternal Vedic religious tradition.

Second, that Bhadreshdas Swami is an acharya and a contemporary commentator in the lineage of commentators on the Prasthanatrayi.

Third, that within philosophy, it is valid to identify Swaminarayan's Vedanta by the title Akshar-Purshottam Darshana.

Fourth, that all members of the Shri Kashi Parisad endorse the Akshar Purshottam Siddhant, revealed by Parabrahma Swaminarayan as distinct from Advaita, Vishistadvaita, and all other doctrines and is indeed a Vedic Siddhanta.

=== Swaminarayan Siddhanta Sudha ===
On 17 September 2017, Mahant Swami Maharaj inaugurated the Swaminarayan-Siddhanta-Sudha, a text authored by Bhadreshdas. This text is a vadagrantha, or a formal exposition, justification and defense of the philosophical and theological positions of a darshan. This specific vadagrantha is composed on the Akshar-Purshottam Darshan. It presents a sophisticated treatment of the philosophical principles of Bhagwan Swaminarayan.

=== Awards ===
In recognition of his work on the commentary, the Kavikulguru Kalidas Sanskrit University in Nagpur, India, awarded Bhadreshdas Swami a D. Litt. in 2010, then in 2012, the title Mahamahopadhyaya (an honorific recognition awarded by the Indian government to prestigious scholars), the highest academic honor bestowed by that institution. He has also received the "Professor G.M. Memorial Award" from the University of Mysore and the "Darshankesari award" in 2013 for this work. At the World Sanskrit Conference in Bangkok in 2015, he was awarded the "Vedant Martand Sanman" by Silpakorn University in Thailand.

== Bibliography ==
- Bhadreshdas, Sadhu (2009). Swaminarayan Bhashyam : Brahmasutra Swaminarayan Bhashyam. Amdavad: Aksharpith. ISBN 978-8175261181. LCCN 2011432134.
- Bhadreshdas, Sadhu (2009). Upanishat Swaminarayan bhashyam : Ishadyashtopanishad Swaminarayan bhashyam. Amdavad: Aksharpith. ISBN 978-8175263062. LCCN 2011432133.
- Bhadreshdas, Sadhu (2012). Swaminarayan bhashyam : Shrimad Bhagavad Gita Swaminarayan bhashyam. Amdavad: Aksharpith. ISBN 9788175265165. LCCN 2011432126.
- Bhadreshdas, Sadhu (2012). Swaminarayan bhashyam : Chhandogyopanishad Swaminarayan bhashyam. Amdavad: Aksharpith. ISBN 9788175265318. LCCN 2011432128.
- Bhadreshdas, Sadhu (2012). Swaminarayan bhashyam : Bruhadaranyakopanishad Swaminarayan bhashyam. Amdavad: Aksharpith. ISBN 9788175265325. LCCN 2011432125.
- Das, Mahamahopadhyaya Sadhu Bhadresh (2012). "Mukti Mīmāṃsā". Journal of the Ananthacharya Indological Research Institute. 10. catalogued at "DIP: Das 2011-2012 (2012)". www.univie.ac.at. 2012. Archived from the original on 5 January 2016.
- Bhadreshdas, Sadhu; Paramvivekdas, Sadhu (1 June 2012). Essence of the Upanishads: The Wisdom of the Ancient Rishis (1st ed.). Swaminarayan Aksharpith. ISBN 9788175263529. OCLC 820817846.
