= Pramada =

Pramada may refer to:

- Pramada (Indian philosophy), carelessness in Indian philosophy
- Pramada Charan Banerjee, an Indian jurist
- Pramada Menon, an Indian feminist
- Exercises with clubs in Indian wrestling, as described in the Malla Purana
- Pramanta, a town in northwestern Greece
- Mike Edwards (musician) (1948–2010), English cellist, also known as Swami Deva Pramada or Pramada
