= Bhedabheda =

Subschool of Vedānta

Bhedābheda refers to a tradition in Vedānta that teaches that the individual self (jīvātman) is both different (bheda) and not different (abheda) from Brahman (Ultimate Reality). It encompasses sub-schools such as Shuddhadvaita and Acintya-Bhedabheda.

== Etymology ==
Bhedābheda (Devanagari: भेदाभेद) is a Sanskrit word meaning "difference and non-difference".

== History ==
Bhedabheda refers to a tradition of scholars who share the view that the individual self and Brahman are simultaneously distinct and non-distinct. It was primarily developed in the 7th century CE, with key contributions from Bhāskara and Nimbārka. Bhāskara, who was either Shankara's contemporary or lived shortly after Shankara, was the principal author.

Under this overarching tradition, there are specific schools.

== Philosophy ==
There are multiple ways that 'difference and non-difference' is interpreted in Bhedābheda traditions. In the most basic sense, the position holds that both the individual self and the world are "in some way simultaneously different from and identical with Brahman."

Bhaskara and Nimbarka mark two ends on the spectrum in this tradition. For Bhaskara, the non-difference of Brahman is more real than the multiplicity of individual selves. He believed that Brahman is one, without difference, in its natural state. For Bhaskara, difference is only temporary and is caused by upādhis (limiting conditions). This is why his doctrine is known as aupādhika-bhedābheda-vāda ("Difference and Non-difference Based on Limiting Conditions"). Nimbarka believed that Brahman's essential nature includes equally real states of difference and non-difference, and thus his doctrine is known as svābhāvika-bhedābheda-vāda ("Natural Difference and Non-difference").

=== Epistemology ===
Of the main sources of knowledge, the tradition regards śāstra as the ultimate source.

According to Bhaskara, liberation can only be achieved after death.

=== Difference from Advaita Interpretations ===
The philosopher Vijñānabhikṣu argued that the Bhedabheda philosophy was superior to other interpretations as it could make sense of seeming contradictions in the Vedas. He pointed out that Advaita interpretations fall short because they only prioritize statements that suggest the identical nature of Brahman and the soul. However, these interpretations subordinate statements that point to the difference between Brahman and the soul, resorting to interpreting them as figurative. In order to make sense of the Vedas' statements as consistent, Vijñānabhikṣu argued that difference and non-difference can also mean separation and non-separation, rather than identity and negation of identity. The meaning of bheda and abheda, then, determined according to the context, solves the problem of taking some statements from the Vedas as untrue or merely figurative.

According to Bhedabheda, Brahman is the material cause of everything in the world, similar to how clay transforms into different forms like pots and cups. Advaita Vedanta argues that Brahman does not undergo any change; the difference that appears in the world is unreal.

== Influence ==
Bhedābheda ideas had an enormous influence on the devotional (bhakti) schools of India's medieval period. Among medieval Bhedābheda thinkers are:

- Nimbārka (dates proposed by scholars range from the 7th century to the 15th century), who founded the Svābhābika Dvaitādvaita school.
- Bhāskara (8th and 9th centuries), who founded the Aupādhika Bhedābheda school.
- Vallabha, proponent of the Śuddhādvaita philosophy.
- Chaitanya (1485–1533), the founder of Gaudiya Vaishnavism based in the eastern Indian state of West Bengal, and the theological founder of Achintya Bheda Abheda Vedantavedanta.
- Guru Nanak (1439–1569), the founder of Sikhism based in North India.
- Ramanujacharya, founder of Vishishtadvaita Vedanta and proponent of Sri Vaishnavism.

Other major names are Rāmānuja's teacher Yādavaprakāśa and Vijñānabhikṣu (16th century).

== See also ==
- Dvaitadvaita
- Gaudiya Vaishnavism / Achintya Bheda Abheda

== Sources ==
- Sivananda, Swami (1993), All About Hinduism, The Divine Life Society
