= Pratibimbavada =

Hindu philosophical concept

- Samkhya: Kapila
- Yoga: Patanjali
- Vaisheshika: Kaṇāda, Prashastapada
- Secular: Valluvar

Pratibimbavada (Sanskrit: प्रतिबिम्बवाद) or the theory of reflection, whose origin can be traced to the Brahma Sutra II.iii.50, is credited to Padmapada, the founder of the Vivarana School of Advaita Vedanta and the author of Pancapadika which is a commentary on Sankara’s Brahma Sutra Bhasya. According to the Vivarana School, Brahman is the locus of Avidya, and which, with regard to the relation existing between the Jiva and Brahman, concludes that the Jiva is a mere reflection (pratibimba) of its prototype (bimba) i.e., of Brahman, and therefore, identical with its essence, Brahman. This school holds the view that the mahavakya, tat tvam asi, is sufficient for the attainment of enlightenment, of the realization of the identity between the self and Reality.

== Vedanta views ==
The followers of Avacchedavada, the theory of limitation credited to Vacaspati Misra, the founder of the Bhamati school, are of the view that Pratibimbavada fails to explain how absolute consciousness, which has no sensible qualities, can be reflected; the followers of Pratibimbavada are of the view that limitation, implying ignorance, actually separates the Universal Self from the individual self which cannot be the locus of Avidya, that the modified consciousness cannot be the ground or support for the limiting adjunct which produces it.

But, both the Avacchedavada and the Pratibimbavada do not escape the dualism incipient in them, from which drawback Sankara's concept of anirvacaniya maya does not suffer; anirvacaniya means – something, although positive, is neither determinable as real, nor as unreal. The former emphasizes the aspect of abheda ('non-difference') and the latter puts more emphasis on the aspect of bheda ('difference'). Sankara sees no connection whatsoever between the Self (Atman) and the mind-body complex except through avidya that gives no real connection but only an imagined connection.

== Opposite view and its refutation ==
Vadiraja, although refuting non-dualism since plurality of Brahman's attributes is inescapable if the primary sense of the scriptures interpreted is taken seriously, accepts a limited similarity between Jiva and Brahman but contends that if the reflection of Brahman stands for the Jiva, the embodied soul, the same, owing to the obvious dissimilarities referred to, cannot be identified with Brahman then such a comparison only succeeds in annihilating the soul. Sankara regards the reflection of consciousness (Chidabhasa) as wholly unreal. In his Maneesha Panchakam (St.2), Sankara argues that distinctions if any between the one Consciousness reflected in the hearts of all and its reflection are delusory. According to the Vedanta the 'Light of Consciousness' reflected in the pools of thought in the mind-intellect is the individualised sentient ego in each one of us; this is the Theory of Reflection. Vidyaranya reiterates that Abhasa and Pratibimba refer to slight or partial manifestation which resembles the real but does not have the properties of the real entity.

== Role of consciousness and mind ==
The individual soul is only the reflection of the Atman on the mind; this reflection gives rise to a separate sense of ego. The pure consciousness of the Atman is unchangeable; as the reflection of its consciousness falls upon the mind the mind takes the form of the Atman and appears to be conscious. The mind is able to perceive because it reflects both the Atman and the object of perception (Yoga Sutras IV.21-22). Whereas Padmapada in his Pancapadika and Prakasatman in his Pancapadikavivarna hold that Ishvara and Jiva as reflections of pure consciousness, the reflection that avidya ('nescience') superimposed on Brahman receives, that the reflected image is as real as the prototype, Sarvajnatman in his Samksepasariraka states that Pure Consciousness reflected in nescience is Ishvara and the same pure consciousness reflected in the inner sense is the Jiva on which account Ishvara, as a reflected image, is subject to the defects of avidya in as much as when characterized by nescience the self is construed as a witness; when identified with the intellect, it is taken to be the knower.

Pratibimbavada states that the Self (Brahman or Atman) is reflected or projected onto its own inscrutable (anirvachaniya) power or avidya ('nescience'). Thus the Jiva is the reflection (effect), and is non-different from Brahman (since effect doesn't have a separate or independent existence from the cause, just like a gold bangle or a gold ring doesn't have a separate existence from the lump of gold). This leads to the inference that the changing existence or Sat-Asat (empirical/objective existence or Vyavaharika, and the imagined/subjective existence or Pratibhasika), as well as the unchanging, unborn, attribute-less, absolute existence or Sat (Paramarthika), are all Brahman (Everything is Brahman).
