= Theory of reflection =

Theory of reflection can refer to:

- Reflection (physics)
- Reflection (computer science)
- Reflection (artificial intelligence)
- Pratibimbavada, a Hindu philosophical concept
