= Non-difference (Abheda) =

Non-difference

Non-difference is the nearest English translation of the Sanskrit word abheda, meaning non-existence of difference. In Vedanta philosophy this word plays a vital role in explaining the indicatory mark in respect of the unity of the individual self with the Infinite or Brahman.

== Doctrine of Non-difference ==
Audolomi (Brahma Sutra I.iv.21) is believed to have held the view that the individual self differs from the supreme self while it possesses a body, but when a man obtains the clear knowledge by means of practice and meditation, dies, leaves the body and obtains complete liberation, the individual self becomes the supreme self, which means in liberation, there is no difference; in transmigration, there is difference; the absolutely different individual self becomes identical in the state of liberation. This is the non-identity non-difference theory of Audolomi. However, Kasakrtsna (Brahma Sutra I.iv.22) believed that the very supreme self exists as the individual soul without undergoing any change which view-point is supported by Badarayana when he reiterates that the individual is only an apparent part of the partless Brahman; the difference is imaginary. This is the non-duality non-difference theory of Kasakrtsna. In his commentary on the Brahma Sutra II.i.14 Adi Sankara explains that the difference between the 'experiencer' and the 'things experienced' which is observed in common experience, in reality does not exist, there is non-difference of cause and effect for all things are merely modifications, and "a modification has speech as its origin and exists only in name" (Chandogya Upanishad VI.i.4), and "All this has That as its essence; That is the Reality; That is the Self; That thou art" (Chandogya Upanishad Vi.vii.7); "All this is but the Self" (Chandogya Upanishad VII.xxv.2). Difference commonly observed is the creation of ignorance whereas non-difference is natural; when the individual ignorance is destroyed through knowledge unity with Self is attained – "Anyone who knows that supreme Brahman becomes Brahman indeed" (Mundaka Upanishad III.ii.9), "Being but Brahman, he is absorbed in Brahman" (Brhadaranyaka Upanishad IV.iv.6).

In Hindu philosophy according to the Doctrine of Non-difference (abheda) there is no difference (bheda) whatsoever between the individual self (atman) and the supreme Self (Paramatman) or (Brahman). The opinion of the Sruti is that the knowledge of oneness of Brahman and atman is samyag-jnana ( Vivekachudamani. 204). The word ekatvam in this sloka that reads - brahmatmaikatvavijnanam samyajjnanam sruter matam means "non-difference", the experience of this non-difference between Brahman (supreme Self) and atman (individual self) is samyag-jnana. It is the person tainted by bhrama ("delusion") and pramada ("carelessness") who cannot determine what is samyag-jnana or "true knowledge". Right knowledge removes all products of ajnana ("ignorance"); ajnana is of the nature of Mithya, hinting differences between atman and Brahman. Then, all phenomenal expressions imagined on Brahman are denied and Brahman stands out as outside the negation Neti neti.

== Nature of Non-difference ==
According to the Theory of the Pre-existent Effect, there is no annihilation of the existence, nor is there any creation of the non-existent, which means, there cannot be anything new or the destruction of what exists; and that there is no relation between cause and effect. With regard to the non-difference of the cause and the effect the general views are that, a) the difference (negation of non-difference) of the cause and effect is the essence (swarupa) of the cause and the effect, and the non-difference of them is their relation of identity; b) that difference of cause and effect is their essential quality and that their non-difference is the negation of that difference, and c) that both difference and non-difference are essential qualities of the cause and effect and are equally positive in character and colour. These views lead to the reasoning that non-difference of the cause and effect cannot be taken as absolutely different from them, non-difference is not an attribute different from cause and effect and if difference is interpreted as constituting the essential nature of the cause and effect, with non-difference qualifying it as an attribute then a rational conception of the relation between cause and effect cannot be formed. It is held that the effect before its manifestation remains undifferentiated in the cause, because the causal substance is the substance of the effect as a substance therefore, the effect cannot be different from the cause, it evolves out of the cause, it exists inseparable from the cause and at the time of destruction it merges in the nature of the cause. Also, specific features that constitute the effect are not different from the cause. Thus, the entire world which prior to its manifestation is existent in an unmanifest state in the nature of Prakrti, the Primal Energy, the modification of Prakrti resulting in the perceivable world does not make it lose its identity. Existence is a manifestation of the unmanifest Brahman, and the individual souls (atman) are the reflections of Brahman and non-different from Brahman, but even then non-difference cannot become the content of awareness without reference to difference. To the Advaitins, non-difference is real and it is not known through reasoning. Brahman is then held to be knowable because it is different from empirical things.

== Implication ==
Non-difference is the essential (svabhavika) condition - He who knows the highest Brahman becomes Brahman Himself and Being Brahman he goes to Brahman, while the distinction of souls from Brahman and each other is due to their limiting adjuncts (internal organs, sense-organs and the body), and the Upadhis that are produced, in accordance with the actions of the individual souls, as essentially non-different and different from Brahman. Advaitins maintain the view that there is complete undividedness (akhandata) or identity (tadatmya) of the individual soul and Brahman; the former is the latter limited by artificial conditions (upadhis). According to Vijnanabhikshu, difference (bheda) and non-difference (abheda) can also be understood to mean separation (vibhaga) and non-separation (avibhaga).e.g. pure water poured into pure water. The statements that reject difference have as their concern difference in the sense of non-separation. As regards the difference in the sense of non-separation Brihadaranyaka Upanishad explains that the essence of that which is gross, mortal, limited and defined is the eye for it is the essence of the defined which means, the mental mode associated with comparison that gives rise to duality and multiplicity i.e. separateness, is connected with the eye. The essence of that which is subtle, immortal, unlimited, unchanging and undefined is the unseeable being that is in the right-eye. Similarly the defined is the Sun but the undefined is that which moves within the Sun.

== Significance ==
With regard the meaning of Brahma Sutra II.i.15 which reads bhave cha uplabhdheha, Adi Shankara explains that it means - the effect is non-different from the cause for this further reason, that the effect is perceived when the cause is there, but not otherwise, it also means that not only is the non-difference of the cause and effect to be accepted on the authority of scriptures, their non-difference is also to be accepted on the strength of the existence of such a perception; for direct perception does occur about the non-difference of the cause and effect. And, with regard the interpretation of Brahma Sutra III.ii.22, Adi Shankara explains that neither the form of Brahman consisting of the phenomenal manifestations can be denied, nor Brahman, the possessor of form, for that would lead to nihilism. And that the unreal can only be denied on the basis of something real. Since the Sruti insists that Brahman is to be realized as existing failing to reach which, words turn back with the mind ( it is the phenomenal expression alone of Brahman is denied and not Brahman which appears to be different during activity, yet intrinsically there is non-difference, mark the Mahavakya, Tat tvam asi and the Sruti vakya, There is no other witness but Him. The individual self, which is non-different from the supreme Self i.e. Brahman, does not become liberated so long as it persists to be by nature an agent and experience when at the same time that its identity with Brahman, realizable through knowledge, does not exist “because when there is duality, as it were, then one sees something” “but when to the knower of Brahman everything has become the Self, then what should one see and through what?”
