= Jiva =

Metaphysical entity believed to be imbued with a life force

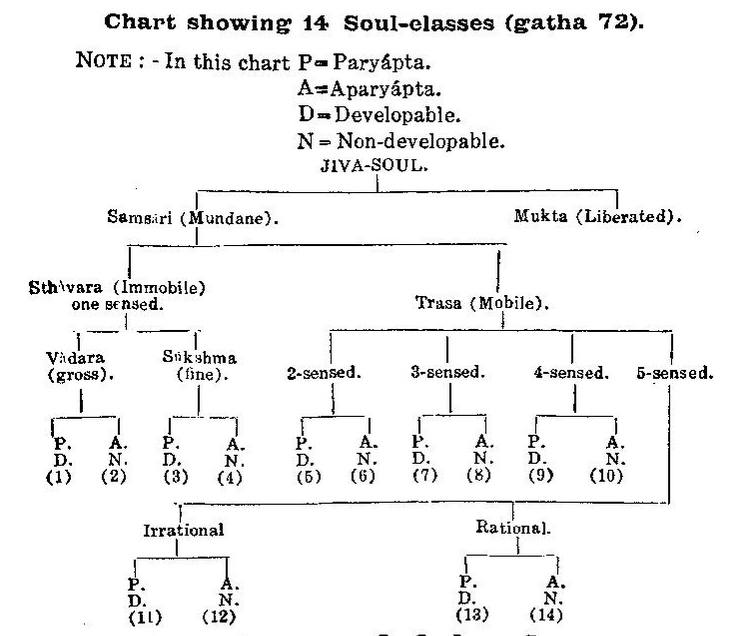
Classifications of Jivas (souls) from The Sacred Book of the Jainas

Jiva (Sanskrit: जीव, IAST: jīva), also referred as Jivātman, is a living being or any entity imbued with a life force in Hinduism and Jainism. The word itself originates from the Sanskrit verb-root jīv, which translates as 'to breathe' or 'to live'. The jiva, as a metaphysical entity, has been described in various scriptures such as the Bhagavad Gita and the Upanishads. Each subschool of Vedanta describes the role of the jiva with the other metaphysical entities in varying capacities. The closest translation into English and Abrahamic philosophies would be the soul.

== Described in the scriptures ==
A common metaphysical entity discussed in the scriptures (such as the Bhagavad Gita, Upanishads and Vachanamrut) in the seven schools of Vedanta is the jiva or atman: the soul or self.

=== Bhagavat Purana ===
The Bhagavata Purana refers to the jiva as that atman which has been united with gross and subtle matter. It is like bubbles produced when wind and water come together.

=== Bhagavad Gita ===
Chapter 2 of the Bhagavad Gita contains verses describing the jiva. For example, the jiva is described as eternal and indestructible in chapter 2, verse 20:

न जायते म्रियते वा कदाचिन्

नायं भूत्वा भविता वा न भूयः ।

अजो नित्यः शाश्वतोऽयं पुराणो

न हन्यते हन्यमाने शरीरे

"The soul is unborn and eternal, everlasting and primeval. It is not slain by the slaying of the body."

— Bhagavad Gita 2.20, "

=== Upanishads ===
बालाग्रशतभागस्य शतधा कल्पितस्य च । भागो जीवः स विज्ञेयः स चानन्त्याय कल्पते ॥ ९ ॥

"If the tip of the hair were to be divided in to one hundred parts and each part was divided into 100 more parts, that would be the dimension of the Jiva (soul)". Śvetāśvatara Upaniṣad (5.9)

The Shvetashvatara Upanishad compares the jiva and the Paramatma to two friendly birds sitting on the same tree:

समाने वृक्षे पुरुषो निमग्नोऽनीशया शोचति मुह्यमानः । जुष्टं यदा पश्यत्यन्यमीशमस्य महिमानमिति वीतशोकः ॥ ७ ॥

"Two birds sitting in the tree (the body). One bird, the jiva is enjoying the fruits of the tree and the other the Paramatma is watching the jiva." Śvetāśvatara Upaniṣad (4.7)

=== Vachanamrut ===
Swaminarayan has described the nature of the jiva in his discourse in Vachanamrut Jetalpur 2:

The jiva is uncuttable, unpiercable, immortal, formed of consciousness, and the size of an atom. You may also ask, 'Where does the jiva reside?' Well, it resides within the space of the heart, and while staying there, it performs different functions. From there, when it wants to see, it does so through the eyes; when it wants to hear sounds, it does so through the ears; it smells all types of smells through the nose; it tastes through the tongue; and through the skin, it experiences the pleasures of all sensations. In addition, it thinks through the mind, contemplates through the citta [one of the inner faculties] and forms convictions through the intelligence [buddhi]. In this manner, through the ten senses and the four inner faculties, it perceives all of the sense-objects [i.e objects of sensorial perception'. It pervades the entire body from head to toe, yet is distinct from it. Such is the nature of the jiva.

— Vachanamrut Jetalpur 2, :

== Vedanta ==
Vedanta is one of the six schools (darshanam) of Hindu philosophy, and it contains subschools that have derived their beliefs from the Upanishads, the Brahma Sutras, and the Bhagavad Gita. The aforementioned three scriptures are commonly referred to as the Prasthantrayi.

=== Advaita Darshan ===
The Advaita (non-dualist) Darshan posits the existence of only one entity, Brahman. It considers all distinctions ultimately false since differentiation requires more than one entity. Those distinctions empirically perceived, along with those expounded in the Prasthanatrayi, are accounted for within this school by the recognition of a relative reality (vyavaharik satta). One such distinction is that between jivas, or souls, and Brahman. Understood through the paradigm of relative reality, jivas are cloaked by maya—avidya, or ignorance—a state in which they are not able to realize their oneness with Brahman. Within Advaita philosophy, the nature of the Jiva is described using three theories or metaphors: Pratibimba-vāda (theory of reflection), Avaccheda-vāda (theory of limitation), and Ābhāsa-vāda (theory of appearance). According to Pratibimba-vāda, the jiva consists of a reflection of the atman, and the mirror on which the reflection occurs is ignorance (avidya). This metaphor clarifies that the atman and jiva are not distinct, even though they appear to be so, just as one's reflection in the mirror appears to be distinct from oneself but is actually identical with one. Avaccheda-vāda denies that consciousness can be reflected, and instead understands the jiva as a limitation (upadhi) of the atman. It is limited and appears to be separated from other selves because of ignorance.

=== Bhedhabheda (Dvaitadvait) Darshan ===
The Bhedhabheda Darshan, founded by Nimbarka, maintains that jivas are at once distinct and part of Brahman, a middle ground of sorts between the extremes of Advaita, utter oneness, and Dvaita, utter distinctness. This notion of difference yet non-difference is commonly depicted through an analogy: just as rays originate from the sun but are spatio-temporally distinct from it, so too jivas are parts of the whole that is Brahman. Another analogy given is that of sparks emitted from a fire. The sparks, composed of same substance as fire, are non-different (abheda) from the fire. They are also different (bheda), located in different place from the fire from which they originated. Yet another analogy given is of ocean and its waves, which shows that even though the bhedabheda darshan entails that Brahman has parts and jivas are part of Brahman, this does not mean jivas lessen its perfection, just as the waves of the ocean do not lessen the amount of water present in the ocean.

=== Dvaita Darshan ===
Founded by Madhva, the Dvaita (dualist) Darshan rejects the Advaita (non-dualist) notion of one ultimate reality. It propounds a duality of five kinds, the most fundamental of which is that between jivas and Ishvara. A jiva is differentiated from God or Ishvara due to the jiva’s dependence on Ishvara; this state is an indication of eternal, ontological distinction. Unique to this school is the idea of a hierarchy of souls, evocative of predestination. Within the system, some souls are inherently and eternally destined for liberation, others for hell and still others for migration through the cycle of birth and death. It is in this cycle where jivas have the opportunity to perform positive or negative deeds (karmas), and make spiritual efforts to break free of it, known as liberation (moksha).

=== Vishishtadvaita Darshan ===
The Vishishtadvaita Darshan, proposed by Ramanuja, maintains an ontological distinction between jivas and God. However, unlike in the Dvaita Darshan, the distinction is qualified. The jiva still remains dependent on God for its qualities and volition. Ramanuja uses the doctrine of the body and the soul (sarira and sariri) to explain the relationship between God and the jivas. The jivas constitutes the body of God, and God is the soul of the jivas. Using this doctrine, Ramanuja is able to maintain an ontological distinction between God and the jivas, while still demonstrating their qualified non-duality.

Vishishtadvaita holds, like other darshanas, that the self is chetan, a conscious being that is made up of consciousness. It refers to jiva, atman, cit, and cetana as synonyms. The school offers many rebuttals against the Advaita conception, one of which addresses the way in which Advaita's jiva, Brahman, may be in a state of ignorance. The Vishishtadvaita Darshan argues that if ignorance is not a quality of Brahman, then the notion of non-duality is contradicted. Ramanuja compares the consciousness of the jiva, as an atman, to the relationship between a lamp and the light it emits:

The one luminous substance exists as light and as the possessor of light....possesses luminosity, because it illuminates both its own form and that of others. But it behaves as a quality of that luminous substance....In this same way, the self has the form of consciousness but also has the quality of consciousness

— Melkote vol. 1: 89, 90,

Unlike other schools, Vishishtadvaita philosophy proposes that moksha (liberation) is not just the end of transmigration, but also a sense of bliss and joy found in the contemplation of God and living a life of devotion, as a result of which God will aid in granting moksha.

=== Shuddhadvaita Darshan ===
The Shuddadvaita Darshan, proposed by Vallabhacharya, has a concept of "nitya-sambandha" which means eternal relationship between jiva and Brahman (Parabrahman). The jiva's inherent nature is divine, pure, and spiritual. The jiva's ultimate purpose is to engage in a loving devotion to Krishna (Supreme Brahman), and liberation is attained through divine grace and the acceptance of the jiva's loving surrender to Krishna. Vallabhacharya uses an analogy between fire and its sparks, where jivas are sparks emerging from God's fire, tiny yet sharing the same essence.

=== Acintya Bheda Abheda ===
The Acintya Bheda Abheda, proposed by Chaitanya Mahaprabhu, maintains that jiva and Brahman are same (abheda) and different (bheda) and the relationship is inconceivable in thought (acintya). Jiva Goswami, one of the main scholars in the Caitanya Vaisnava school, offers a definition of the self that shares many characteristics of other schools but is distinctly aligned with the Bhedhabhedha position that the jiva is a part of Brahman:

Furthermore, it has the intrinsic characteristics of being an apprehender, agent and qualitative experiencer, and by its own nature and at all times it is an inherent part of indwelling Lord.

— Jiva Goswami,

The philosophy proposed by Chaitanya Mahaprabhu accepts that the jiva is aware and possesses distinct qualities. It is neither god, human or animal, and is separate from the senses and mind. It is unchanging, possessing consciousness and bliss, and pervades the body. Whilst the body and mind require a jiva to function, the jiva's awareness and existence is not dependant on anything. Goswami also describes that "there is a different self in each body, each one an inherent part of the Lord".

=== Akshar-Purushottam Darshan ===
The Akshar-Purushottam Darshan, the teachings of Swaminarayan as interpreted by the BAPS, centers around the existence of five eternal realities, as stated in two of Swaminarayan’s sermons documented in the Vachanamrut, Gadhada 1.7 and Gadhada 3.10:

Puruṣottama Bhagavān, Akṣarabrahman, māyā, īśvara and jīva – these five entities are eternal.

From all the Vedas, Purāṇas, Itihāsa and Smṛti scriptures, I have gleaned the principle that jīva, māyā, īśvara, Brahman and Parameśvara are all eternal.

The jiva is defined as a distinct, individual soul, i.e., a finite sentient being. Jivas are bound by maya, which hides their true self, which is characterized by eternal existence, consciousness and bliss. There are an infinite number of jivas. They are extremely subtle, indivisible, unpierceable, ageless and immortal. While residing within the heart, a jiva pervades the entire body by its capacity to know (gnānshakti), making it animate. It is the form of knowledge (gnānswarūp) as well as the knower (gnātā). The jiva is the performer of virtuous and immoral actions (karmas) and experiences the fruits of these actions. It has been eternally bound by maya; as a result, it roams within the cycle of birth and death. Birth is when a jiva acquires a new body, and death is when it departs from its body. Just as one abandons one's old clothes and wears new ones, the jiva renounces its old body and acquires a new one.

== Similarities with other Schools ==
=== Samkhya-Yoga ===
There are important similarities between the jiva and the puruṣa of Samkhya-Yoga. The most visible similarity is that both the jiva and puruṣa are part of a dualism. Just like Samkhya's dualism between puruṣa and prakriti, there is a similar dualism between the jiva and ajiva in Jainism. Both the jiva and puruṣa are also said to be numerous. The Samkhyakarika states:

Since birth, death, and the instruments of life are allotted severally; since occupations are not at once universal; and since qualities affect variously; multitude of souls (puruṣa) is demonstrated

— (Samkhya karika Verse 18) ·

Relatedly, each jiva is, just like a puruṣa in Samkhya, qualitatively distinct from another jiva so that each can be termed their "own self".

=== Nyaya Darshan ===
The Nyaya school of philosophy also shares similarities to the Vedanta schools, in that there is the belief that the jiva is eternal, experiences the fruits of its good and bad deeds (karma), and undergoes reincarnation. However unlike other schools where the jiva is the source of consciousness, in the Nyaya school, consciousness is an attribute that only occurs when a jiva associates with a mind. Furthermore, Nyaya schools believe liberation to be a complete absence of suffering, rather than a state of bliss and happiness.

== See also ==
- Gyvas
- Indian religions
- Jīva (Jainism)
- Tirthankara
