= Bhāskara (Bhedabheda Vedanta) =

Indian philosopher (8th-9th century CE)

Bhāskara (8th-9th century CE) was an Indian philosopher and proponent of the Bhedabheda school of Vedanta philosophy. He wrote commentaries on the Brahma Sutras, and contested Shankara's doctrine of māyā.

== Life and Historical Context ==
Bhaskara was a Vedantin philosopher who lived around 8th century CE, a date inferred from his critical references to the theories of Shankara. He is also known to have preceded Vāchaspati Misra, who later cited his work. Most of Bhaskara's writings have been lost, with only his Brahma Sutras commentary and portions of his Bhagavad Gita commentary surviving. His philosophical ideas may have influenced development of Vishishtadvaita and Kashmir Shaivism.

== Tenets ==
Bhaskara's philosophy, expounded in his commentary on Brahma Sutras, is called Aupādhika Bhedābhedavāda ("Difference and Non-difference Based on Limiting Conditions"), defending Bhedābhedavāda against Shankara's interpretations. Bhaskara affirms the reality of the world and individual selves, rejecting Advaita's view that the world is ultimately illusory. He views Brahman as the supreme reality that becomes multiple through real transformations caused by limiting conditions, taking both causal form (kāraṇa-rūpa) and an effect form (kārya-rūpa), being one as cause and multiple as effect, much like gold is one substance but can appear as many bracelets.

Bhaskara insists that suffering is real and rejects Shankara's illusionism (maya-vada), arguing that it is unprovable and similar to Buddhist thought.

Bhaskara rejects the concept of jivan-mukti (liberation in this life), asserting that liberation is attained only after the death of the physical body and requires jñāna-karma-samuccaya-vada, meaning both knowledge and action.

== Sources ==
- Nicholson, Andrew J. "Bhedabheda Vedanta". Internet Encyclopedia of Philosophy.
- Prabhavananda, Swami (1979) [1962], Spiritual Heritage of India, Vedanta Press, ISBN 0-87481-035-3
