= Pramada (Indian philosophy) =

- Samkhya: Kapila
- Yoga: Patanjali
- Vaisheshika: Kaṇāda, Prashastapada
- Secular: Valluvar

Pramada (negligence, carelessness) is the root cause of all pains and problems afflicting all human-beings. Adhyatma Upanishad. 14, terms Pramada as death itself.

== Meaning ==
Pramada in Sanskrit variously means - negligence, inertia, inadvertence, indolence, idleness, sluggishness, inattentiveness. Pramada produces forgetfulness. It is the root cause of all pains and problems afflicting human-beings.

== Implication ==
The Bhagavad Gita XIV 13 and 17 list Pramada (negligence) with Apravrtti (inactivity), Aprakasha (non-illumination) and Moha (delusion) as the products of Tamasi vivrddhe (preponderant state of dullness), which is opposite to knowledge produced by Sattva. The yogasutra ( chapter 1 verse 30 ) includes it in a list of nine causes of mental disturbances.

In Buddhism, Aceshta (sloth), Apravrtti (inactivity) and Pramada (negligence) are collectively known as Thinamiddha.

In Jainism, the expression, Yoga, means activity of the mind, speech and body and Pramada-yoga means careless activity of mind, speech and body, and without caution; it is included in Himsa (injury to the vitalities of the mind, speech and body). Asatya (falsehood) and Chaurya (theft) i.e. statement uttered and things taken influenced by Pramada, are also Himsa. There are fifteen kinds of indolence or Pramada which can over-power the human-mind. In the list of five causes of bondage given at Umasvati's Tattvartha Sutra 8:1, Kasaya (passion) and Pramada (negligence) are listed as independent causes of Bandhahetavah (bondage). In Jainism's Sarvarthasiddhi, Pramada connotes passion.

Adhyatma Upanishad 14 terms Pramada as death itself, therefore, forgetfulness is death. Pramada is certainly the root cause of downfall, decay and death. Asuras were defeated by Pramada only. as per the concept of Sanatkumara described in Sanatsujiyatam it is declared that Pramada understood as wrong perception of the nature of the world amounts to death (Mahabharata 5.42-45).

== Advaita view, in the light of Vivekachudamani ==
Slokas 322 to 329 of Vivekachudamani of Sankaracharya, explain the Advaita Vedanta's concept of the Sanskrit expression, Pramada.

Sankara begins with the instruction that those who are firmly established in Brahman should not be guilty of Pramada i.e. negligence or carelessness about which state Sanatkumara had told Dhritarashtra, was death – pramadam vai mrtyumaham bravimi (I call negligence itself death.) Because fall by negligence is fall from one's real nature, then forgetfulness arises, the ensues the sense of the “I” in the Anatman the cause of all miseries. Sankara adds that forgetfulness confounds even a learned man through defects of intellect for Maya covers a man who is out-ward-bent even if he has annulled the Panchakoshas. Furthermore, if the mind, outward bent, strays away even in the least from its ideal, it will fall continuously; the one who has fallen comes to ruin then there is no going up. For a man of discrimination and in deep concentration on Brahman, there is no other death than Pramada or inadvertence.
