= Vedanta =

One of the six orthodox traditions of Hindu philosophy

Vedanta (/veɪˈdɑːntə/; Sanskrit: वेदान्त, IAST: Vedānta [ʋeːdɑ́ːntɐ]), also known as Uttara Mīmāṃsā, is one of the six orthodox (āstika) schools of Hindu philosophy and textual exegesis. The word Vedanta means 'conclusion of the Vedas,' and encompasses the ideas that emerged from, or aligned and reinterpreted, the speculations and enumerations contained in the Upanishads, focusing, with varying emphasis, on devotion, knowledge, and liberation. Vedanta developed into many traditions, all of which give their specific interpretations of a common group of texts called the Prasthānatrayī, translated as 'the three sources': the Upanishads, the Brahma Sutras, and the Bhagavad Gita.

All Vedanta traditions place great emphasis on textual exegesis and contain extensive discussions on ontology, soteriology, and epistemology, even though there is much disagreement among the various traditions. Independently considered, they may seem completely disparate due to the pronounced differences in thoughts and reasoning.

The main distinct traditions or movements within Vedanta are: Bhedabheda (difference and non-difference); Advaita (non-dualism); and the Vishnu-centred traditions of Dvaitadvaita (dualistic non-dualism), Vishishtadvaita (qualified non-dualism), Tattvavada (Dvaita) (dualism), Suddhadvaita (pure non-dualism), and Achintya-Bheda-Abheda (inconceivable difference and non-difference). (Note: Encyclopedia Britannica, Vedanta: "The main schools are: Shankara's unqualified nondualism (shuddhadvaita); Ramanuja's qualified nondualism (vishishtadvaita); Madhva's dualism (dvaita); Bhaskara's doctrine of identity and difference (bhedabheda); and the schools of Nimbarka and Vallabha, which assert both identity and difference though with different emphasis on either of the two aspects.") Modern developments in Vedanta include Neo-Vedanta, and the philosophy of the Swaminarayan Sampradaya.

Most major Vedanta schools, except Advaita Vedanta and Neo-Vedanta, are related to Vaishnavism and emphasize devotion (bhakti) to God, understood as Vishnu or a related manifestation. Advaita Vedanta, on the other hand, emphasizes jñana (knowledge) and jñana yoga over theistic devotion, though Shankara may also have been a Vaishnavite. (Note: Vaishnava: Mayeda 1992, p. 4: "But his doctrine is far removed from Saivism and Saktism. It can be ascertained from his works that he had some faith in, or was favorable to, Vaishnavism.[13]" P.8 note 13 refers to Nakamura, Vedanta Tetsugaku no Hatten p.531, and Paul Hacker (1965), Relations of early Advaitins to Vaishnavism.; Clark 2006, p. 148: "Sankara, despite being projected as an incarnation of Siva in the hagiographies, was almost certainly a vaisnava, as were his immediate disciples."; Clark 2006, p. 167: "... it may be that he is best described as a refomed Pancaratrin or Bhagavata, Sankara-Bhagavat or Sankara-Bhagavatpada indeed being one of the names he uses to describe himself."; Clark 2006, p. 169: "It is apparent that Sankara was a vaisnava who seems to have been significantly informed by Pancaratra—as were Ramanuja and Madhva—yet Sankara's hagiographers project him as an 'orthodox' (Vedic) saiva."; Nelson 2007, p. 313: "Indeed, as Hacker has shown, there is good evidence that Shankara and his early followers came from strong Vaishnava backgrounds.") While the monism of Advaita has attracted considerable attention in the West due to the influence of the 14th century Advaitin Vidyaranya and modern Hindus like Swami Vivekananda and Ramana Maharshi, most Vedanta traditions focus on Vaishnava theology.

== Etymology and nomenclature ==
The word Vedanta is made of two words:

- Veda (वेद) — refers to the four sacred Vedic texts.
- Anta (अन्त) — meaning "end."

The word Vedanta literally means the end of the Vedas and originally referred to the Upanishads. Vedanta is concerned with the jñānakāṇḍa or knowledge section of the Vedas which is called the Upanishads. The meaning of Vedanta expanded later to encompass the different philosophical traditions that interpret and explain the Prasthānatrayī in the light of their respective views on the relation between humans and the Divine or Absolute reality.

The Upanishads may be regarded as the end of Vedas in different senses:

1. They were the last literary products of the Vedic period.
2. They represent the pinnacle of Vedic philosophy.
3. They were taught and debated last, in the Sannyasa (ascetic) stage.

Vedanta is one of the six orthodox (āstika) traditions of textual exegesis and Indian philosophy. It is also called Uttara Mīmāṃsā, which means the "latter enquiry" or "higher enquiry"; and is often contrasted with Pūrva Mīmāṃsā, the "former enquiry" or "primary enquiry". Pūrva Mīmāṃsā deals with the karmakāṇḍa or ritualistic section (the Samhita and Brahmanas) in the Vedas while Uttara Mīmāṃsā concerns itself with the deeper questions of the relation between humans and Divine or Absolute reality. (Note: Historically, Vedanta has been called by various names. The early names were the Upanishadic ones (Aupanisada), the doctrine of the end of the Vedas (Vedanta-vada), the doctrine of Brahman (Brahma-vada), and the doctrine that Brahma is the cause (Brahma-karana-vada).)

== Vedanta philosophy ==
=== Common features ===
Despite their differences, all traditions of Vedanta share some common features:

- Vedanta is the investigation of Brahman and Ātman.
- The various traditions give their own, specific exegesis of the Upaniṣads, the Bhagavadgītā, and the Brahma Sūtras (known as the three canonical sources).
- Scripture (Sruti Śabda) is the main reliable source of knowledge (pramana).
- Brahman — Īśvara (God), exists as the unchanging material cause and instrumental cause of the world. The exception is that Dvaita Vedanta does not hold Brahman to be the material cause, but only the efficient cause.
- The self (Ātman or Jīva) is the agent of its own acts (karma) and the recipient of the consequences of these actions.
- Belief in rebirth (samsara) and the desirability of release from the cycle of rebirths (moksha).
- Rejection of Buddhism and Jainism and conclusions of the other Vedic schools (Nyaya, Vaisheshika, Samkhya, Yoga, and, to some extent, the Purva Mimamsa).

=== Scripture ===
The main Upanishads, the Bhagavadgītā, and the Brahma Sūtras are the foundational scriptures in Vedanta. All traditions of Vedanta give a specific exegesis of these texts, collectively called the Prasthānatrayī, literally, three sources.

1. The Upanishads, (Note: The Upanishads were many in number and developed in the different schools at different times and places, some in the Vedic period and others in the medieval or modern era (the names of up to 112 Upanishads have been recorded). All major commentators have considered twelve to thirteen oldest of these texts as the Principal Upanishads and as the foundation of Vedanta.) or Śruti prasthāna; considered the Sruti, the "heard" (and repeated) foundation of Vedanta.
2. The Brahma Sūtras, or Nyaya prasthāna / Yukti prasthāna; considered the reason-based foundation of Vedanta.
3. The Bhagavadgītā, or Smriti prasthāna; considered the Smriti (remembered tradition) foundation of Vedanta.

All prominent Vedantic teachers, including Shankara, Bhaskara, Ramanuja, Madhva, Nimbarka, and Vallabha, wrote commentaries on these three sources. The Brahma Sūtras of Badarayana serve as a bhedabheda-based synthesis of the teachings found in the diverse Upanishads, and while there may have been other similar syntheses in the past, only the Brahma Sūtras have survived to the present day. The Bhagavadgītā, with its syncretism of Samkhya, Yoga, and Upanishadic thought, has also been a significant influence on Vedantic thought.

All Vedāntins agree that scripture (śruti) is the only means of knowing (pramāṇa) regarding spiritual matters (which are beyond perception and inference). This is explained by Rāmānuja as follows:

A theory that rests exclusively on human concepts may at some other time or place be refuted by arguments devised by cleverer people.... The conclusion is that with regard to supernatural matters, Scripture alone is the epistemic authority and that reasoning is to be used only in support of Scripture' [Śrī Bhāṣya 2.1.12].

For specific sub-traditions of Vedanta, other texts may be equally important. For example, for Advaita Vedanta, the works of Adi Shankara are nominally central, though other teachers were equally, or even more, influential. For the theistic Vaishnava schools of Vedanta, the Bhāgavata Purāṇa is particularly important. The Bhāgavata Purāṇa is one of the most widely commented upon works in Vedanta. This text is so central to the Krishna-centered Vedanta schools that Vallabha added the Bhāgavata Purāṇa as a fourth text to the Prasthānatrayī (three classic scriptures of Vedanta).

=== Metaphysics ===
Vedanta philosophies discuss three fundamental metaphysical categories and the relations between the three.

1. Brahman or Īśvara: the ultimate reality
2. Ātman or Jivātman: the individual soul, self
3. Prakriti or Jagat: the empirical world, ever-changing physical universe, body and matter

==== Brahman / Īśvara – Conceptions of the Supreme Reality ====
Shankara, in formulating Advaita, talks of two conceptions of Brahman:

- Parā or Higher Brahman: The undifferentiated, absolute, infinite, transcendental, supra-relational Brahman beyond all thought and speech is defined as parā Brahman, nirviśeṣa Brahman, or nirguṇa Brahman and is the Absolute of metaphysics.
- Aparā or Lower Brahman: The Brahman with qualities defined as aparā Brahman or saguṇa Brahman. The saguṇa Brahman is endowed with attributes and represents the personal God of religion.

Ramanuja, in formulating Vishishtadvaita Vedanta, rejects Nirguṇa – that the undifferentiated Absolute is inconceivable – and adopts a theistic interpretation of the Upanishads, accepting Brahman as Īśvara, the personal God who is the seat of all auspicious attributes, as the One reality. The God of Vishishtadvaita is accessible to the devotee, yet remains the Absolute, with differentiated attributes.

Madhva, in expounding Dvaita philosophy, maintains that Vishnu is the supreme God, thus identifying the Brahman, or absolute reality, of the Upanishads with a personal god, as Ramanuja had done before him. Nimbarka, in his Dvaitadvata philosophy, accepted the Brahman both as nirguṇa and as saguṇa. Vallabha, in his Shuddhadvaita philosophy, not only accepts the triple ontological essence of the Brahman, but also His manifestation as personal God (Īśvara), as matter, and as individual souls.

==== Relation between Brahman and Jīva / Atman ====
The schools of Vedanta differ in their conception of the relation they see between Ātman / Jīvātman and Brahman / Īśvara:

- According to Advaita Vedanta (non-dualism), Ātman is identical with Brahman and there is no difference.
- According to Viśiṣṭādvaita (qualified non-dualism), Jīvātman is different from Īśvara, though eternally connected with Him as His mode. The oneness of the Supreme Reality is understood in the sense of an organic unity (vishistaikya). Brahman/Īśvara alone, as organically related to all Jīvātman and the material universe, is the one Ultimate Reality.
- According to Dvaita (dualism), the Jīvātman is totally and always different from Brahman / Īśvara.
- According to Shuddhadvaita (pure non-dualism), the Jīvātman and Brahman are identical; both, along with the changing empirically observed universe being Krishna.

Epistemology in Dvaita and Vishishtadvaita Vedanta. Advaita and some other Vedanta schools recognize six epistemic means.

=== Epistemology ===
==== Pramana ====
Pramāṇa (Sanskrit: प्रमाण) literally means "proof", "that which is the means of valid knowledge". It refers to epistemology in Indian philosophies, and encompasses the study of reliable and valid means by which human beings gain accurate, true knowledge. The focus of Pramana is the manner in which correct knowledge can be acquired, how one knows or does not know, and to what extent knowledge pertinent to someone or something can be acquired. Ancient and medieval Indian texts identify six (Note: A few Indian scholars such as Vedvyasa discuss ten; Krtakoti discusses eight; six is most widely accepted: see Nicholson (2010, pp. 149–150)) pramanas as correct means of accurate knowledge and truths:

1. Pratyakṣa (perception)
2. Anumāṇa (inference)
3. Upamāṇa (comparison and analogy)
4. Arthāpatti (postulation, derivation from circumstances)
5. Anupalabdi (non-perception, negative/cognitive proof)
6. Śabda (scriptural testimony/ verbal testimony of past or present reliable experts).

The different schools of Vedanta have historically disagreed as to which of the six are epistemologically valid. For example, while Advaita Vedanta accepts all six pramanas, Vishishtadvaita and Dvaita accept only three pramanas (perception, inference and testimony).

Advaita considers Pratyakṣa (perception) as the most reliable source of knowledge, and Śabda, the scriptural evidence, is considered secondary except for matters related to Brahman, where it is the only evidence. (Note: Anantanand Rambachan (1991, pp. xii–xiii) states, "According to these [widely represented contemporary] studies, Shankara only accorded a provisional validity to the knowledge gained by inquiry into the words of the Śruti (Vedas) and did not see the latter as the unique source (pramana) of Brahmajnana. The affirmations of the Śruti, it is argued, need to be verified and confirmed by the knowledge gained through direct experience (anubhava) and the authority of the Śruti, therefore, is only secondary." Sengaku Mayeda (2006, pp. 46–47) concurs, adding Shankara maintained the need for objectivity in the process of gaining knowledge (vastutantra), and considered subjective opinions (purushatantra) and injunctions in Śruti (codanatantra) as secondary. Mayeda cites Shankara's explicit statements emphasizing epistemology (pramana–janya) in section 1.18.133 of Upadesasahasri and section 1.1.4 of Brahmasutra–bhasya.) In Viśiṣṭādvaita and Dvaita, Śabda, the scriptural testimony, is considered the most authentic means of knowledge instead.

==== Theory of cause and effect ====
All schools of Vedanta subscribe to the theory of Satkāryavāda, which means that the effect is pre-existent in the cause. But there are two different views on the status of the "effect", that is, the world. Most schools of Vedanta, as well as Samkhya, support Parinamavada, the idea that the world is a real transformation (parinama) of Brahman. According to Nicholson (2010, p. 27), "the Brahma Sutras espouse the realist Parinamavada position, which appears to have been the view most common among early Vedantins". In contrast to Badarayana, post-Shankara Advaita Vedantists hold a different view, Vivartavada, which says that the effect, the world, is merely an unreal (vivarta) transformation of its cause, Brahman. (Note: Nicholson (2010, p. 27) writes of Advaita Vedantin position of cause and effect - Although Brahman seems to undergo a transformation, in fact no real change takes place. The myriad of beings are essentially unreal, as the only real being is Brahman, that ultimate reality which is unborn, unchanging, and entirely without parts.)

== Overview of the classical schools of Vedanta ==
The Upanishads present an associative philosophical inquiry in the form of identifying various doctrines and then presenting arguments for or against them. They form the basic texts and Vedanta interprets them through polemical philosophical exegesis to defend the point of view of their specific sampradaya. Varying interpretations of the Upanishads and their synthesis, the Brahma Sutras, led to the development of different schools of Vedanta over time.

Gavin Flood suggests that although Advaita Vedanta is the most well-known school of Vedanta and is sometimes wrongly perceived as the sole representation of Vedantic thought, with Shankara being a follower of Shaivism, the true essence of Vedanta lies within the Vaisnava tradition and can be considered a discourse within the broad framework of Vaisnavism. Four Vaishnava sampradays are considered to be of special significance based on the teachings of Ramanuja, Madhva, Vallabha, and Nimbarka.

The number of classical Vedanta schools varies among scholars, but typically includes three to six or seven: (Note: Sivananda 1993, p. 217 also mentions Meykandar and the Shaiva Siddhanta philosophy.) (Note: Proponents of other Vedantic schools continue to write and develop their ideas as well, although their works are not widely known outside of smaller circles of followers in India.)

1. Bhedabheda, as early as the 7th century CE, or even the 4th century CE.
  - Dvaitādvaita or Svabhavikabhedabheda (Vaishnava), founded by Nimbarka and Srinivasacharya in the 7th century CE
  - Aupādhika Bhedābheda, Bhāskara (8th–9th c. CE)
  - Suddhadvaita (Vaishnava), founded by Vallabha (1479–1531 CE)
  - Achintya Bheda Abheda (Vaishnava), founded by Chaitanya Mahaprabhu (1486–1534 CE), propagated by Gaudiya Vaishnava
2. Advaita (monistic), many scholars of which most prominent are Gaudapada (c. 500 CE) and Adi Shankaracharya (8th century CE)
3. Vishishtadvaita (Vaishnava), prominent scholars are Nathamuni, Yāmuna and Ramanuja (1017–1137 CE)
4. Tattvavada (Dvaita) (Vaishnava), founded by Madhvacharya (1199–1278 CE). The prominent scholars are Jayatirtha (1345–1388 CE), and Vyasatirtha (1460–1539 CE)

=== Bhedabheda Vedanta (difference and non-difference) ===
Bhedābheda means "difference and non-difference" and is more a tradition than a school of Vedanta. The schools of this tradition emphasize that the individual self (Jīvatman) is both different and not different from Brahman. Notable figures in this school are Bhartriprapancha, Nimbārka and Srinivasa (7th century) who founded the Dvaitadvaita school, Bhāskara (8th–9th century), Ramanuja's teacher Yādavaprakāśa, Chaitanya (1486–1534) who founded the Achintya Bheda Abheda school, and Vijñānabhikṣu (16th century). (Note: According to Nakamura and Dasgupta, the Brahmasutras reflect a Bhedabheda point of view, the most influential tradition of Vedanta before Shankara. Numerous Indologists, including Surendranath Dasgupta, Paul hacker, Hajime Nakamura, and Mysore Hiriyanna, have described Bhedabheda as the most influential school of Vedanta before Shankara.)

==== Dvaitādvaita ====
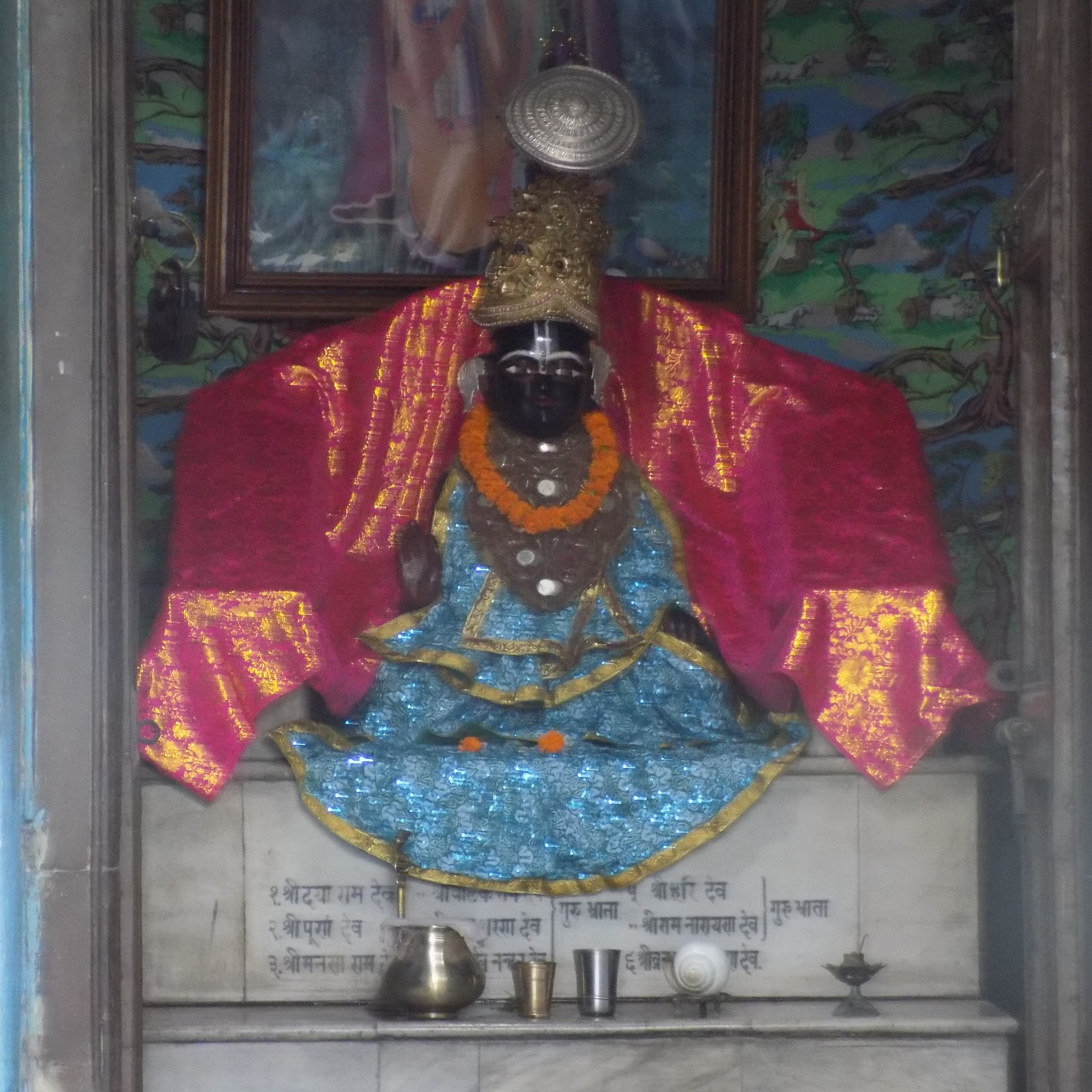
Nimbarkacharya's icon at Ukhra, West Bengal

Nimbārka (7th century) sometimes identified with Bhāskara, and Srinivasa propounded Dvaitādvaita. Brahman (God), souls (chit) and matter or the universe (achit) are considered as three equally real and co-eternal realities. Brahman is the controller (niyanta), the soul is the enjoyer (bhokta), and the material universe is the object enjoyed (bhogya). The Brahman is Krishna, the ultimate cause who is omniscient, omnipotent, all-pervading Being. He is the efficient cause of the universe because, as Lord of Karma and internal ruler of souls, He brings about creation so that the individual souls can reap the consequences of their karma. God is considered to be the material cause of the universe because creation was a manifestation of His powers of soul (chit) and matter (achit); creation is a transformation (parinama) of God's powers. He can be realized only through a constant effort to merge oneself with His nature through meditation and devotion.

==== Achintya-Bheda-Abheda ====
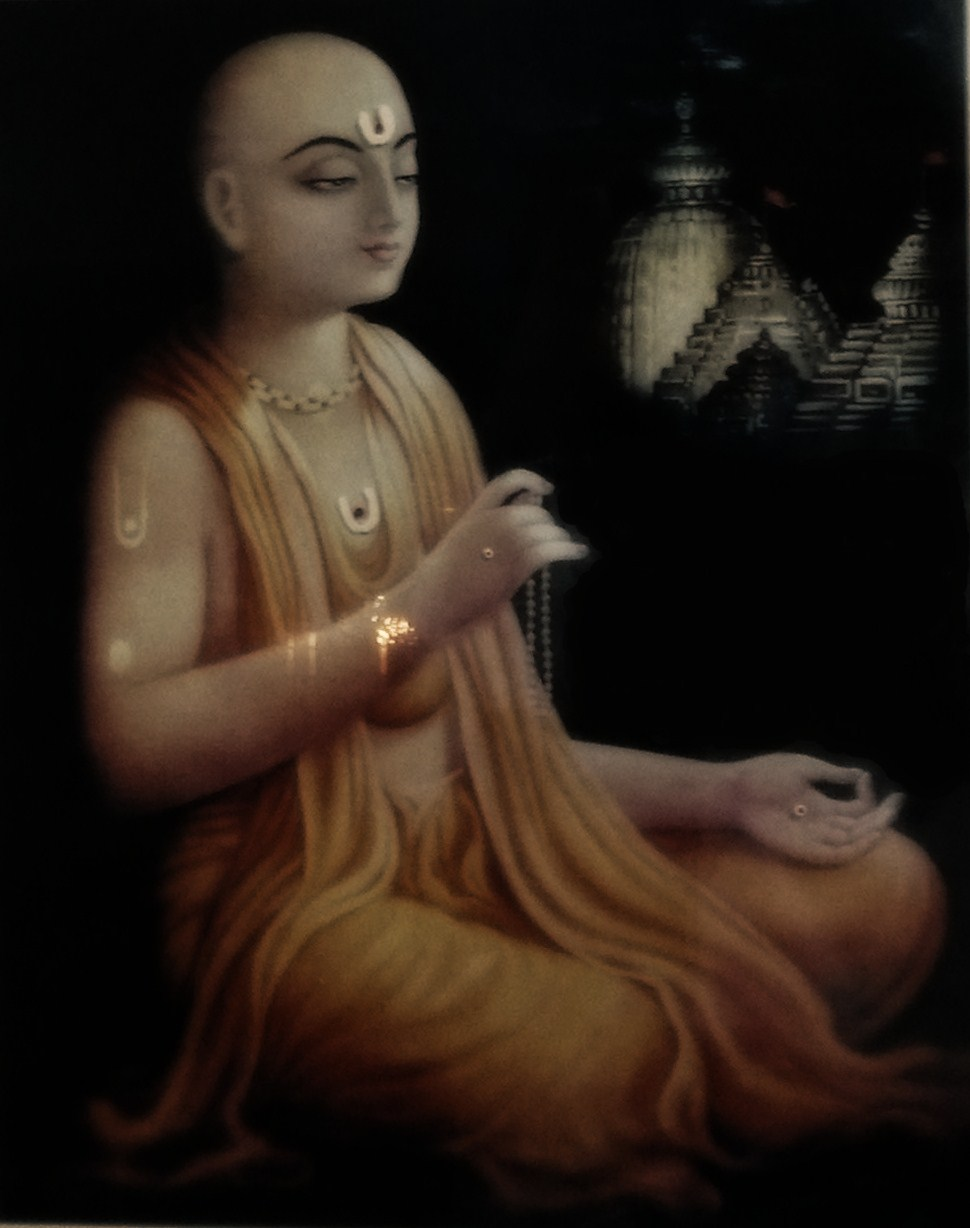
Chaitanya Mahaprabhu

Chaitanya Mahaprabhu (1486–1533) was the prime exponent of Achintya-Bheda-Abheda. In Sanskrit achintya means 'inconceivable'. Achintya-Bheda-Abheda represents the philosophy of "inconceivable difference in non-difference", in relation to the non-dual reality of Brahman-Atman which it calls (Krishna), svayam bhagavan. The notion of "inconceivability" (acintyatva) is used to reconcile apparently contradictory notions in Upanishadic teachings. This school asserts that Krishna is Bhagavan of the bhakti yogins, the Brahman of the jnana yogins, and has a divine potency that is inconceivable. He is all-pervading and thus in all parts of the universe (non-difference), yet he is inconceivably more (difference). This school is at the foundation of the Gaudiya Vaishnava religious tradition. The ISKCON or the Hare Krishnas also affiliate to this school of Vedanta Philosophy.

=== Advaita Vedanta ===
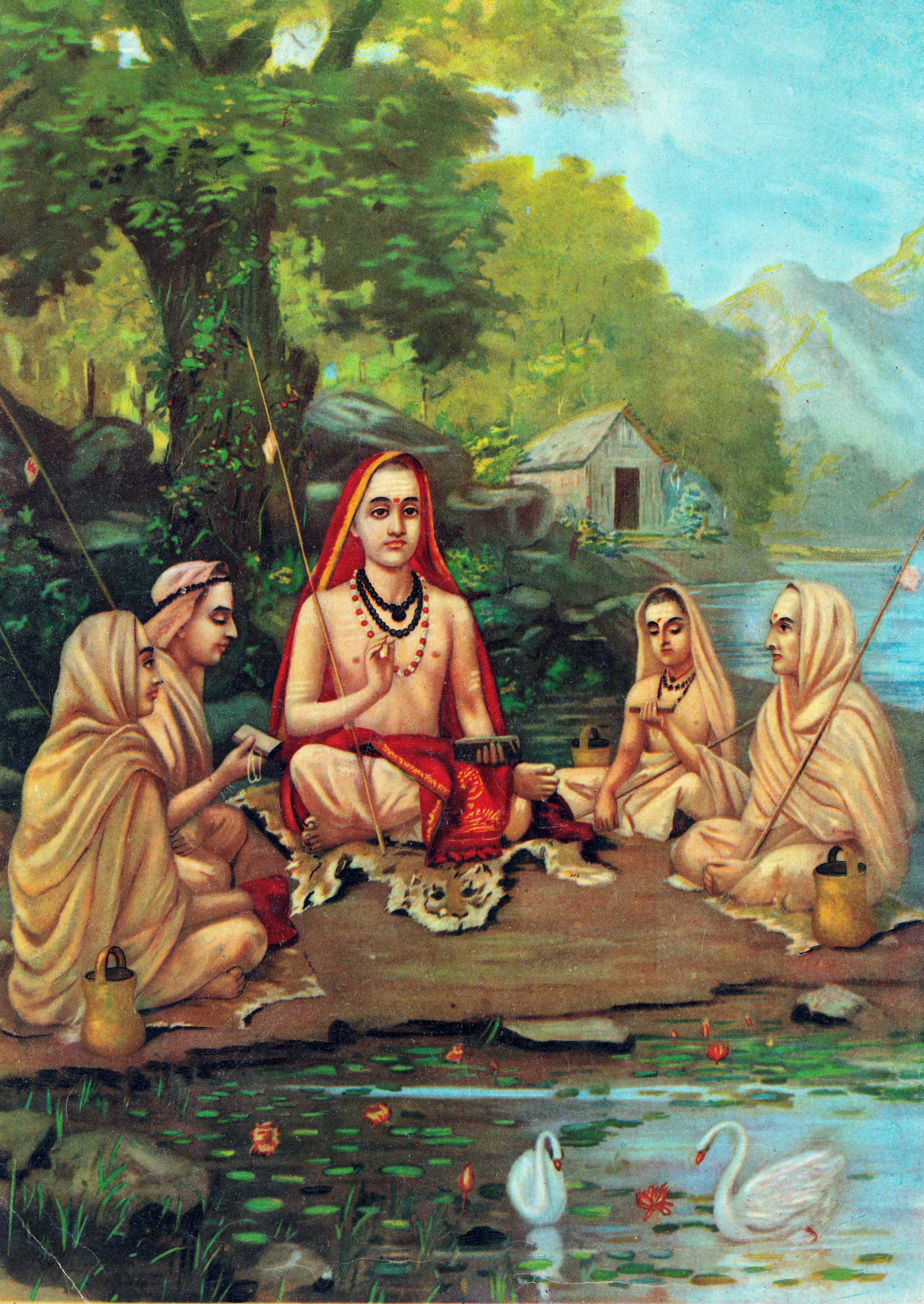
Shankaracharya

Advaita Vedanta (IAST Advaita Vedānta; Sanskrit: (अद्वैत वेदान्त), propounded by Gaudapada (7th century) and Adi Shankara (9th century), but popularized by Vidyaranya (14th century) and 19th-20th century neo-Vedantins, espouses non-dualism and monism. Brahman is held to be the sole unchanging metaphysical reality and identical to the individual Atman. The physical world, on the other hand, is always-changing empirical Maya. (Note: O'Flaherty (1986, p. 119) says "that to say that the universe is an illusion (māyā) is not to say that it is unreal; it is to say, instead, that it is not what it seems to be, that it is something constantly being made. Maya not only deceives people about the things they think they know; more basically, it limits their knowledge.") The absolute and infinite Atman-Brahman is realized by a process of negating everything relative, finite, empirical and changing.

The school accepts no duality, no limited individual souls (Atman / Jīvatman), and no separate unlimited cosmic soul. All souls and their existence across space and time are considered to be the same oneness. Spiritual liberation in Advaita is the full comprehension and realization of oneness, that one's unchanging Atman (soul) is the same as the Atman in everyone else, as well as being identical to Brahman.

=== Vishishtadvaita Vedanta ===
Vishishtadvaita, propounded by Ramanuja (11–12th century), asserts that Jīvatman (human souls) and Brahman (as Vishnu) are different, a difference that is never transcended. With this qualification, Ramanuja also affirmed monism by saying that there is unity of all souls and that the individual soul has the potential to realize identity with the Brahman. Vishishtadvaita is a qualified non-dualistic school of Vedanta and like Advaita, begins by assuming that all souls can hope for and achieve the state of blissful liberation. Such liberation consists of attaining a 'perfected spiritual body' in Vishnu's abode, Vaikuntha. On the relation between the Brahman and the world of matter (Prakriti), Vishishtadvaita states both are two different absolutes, both metaphysically true and real, neither is false or illusive, and that saguna Brahman with attributes is also real. Ramanuja states that God, like man, has both soul and body, and the world of matter is the glory of God's body. The path to Brahman (Vishnu), according to Ramanuja, is devotion to godliness and constant remembrance of the beauty and love of the personal god (bhakti of saguna Brahman).

=== Dvaita ===
Tattvavada, propounded by Madhvacharya (13th century), is based on the premise of realism or realistic point of view. The term Dvaita, which means dualism, was later applied to Madhvacharya's philosophy. Atman (soul) and Brahman (as Vishnu) are understood as two completely different entities. Brahman is the creator of the universe, perfect in knowledge, perfect in knowing, perfect in its power, and distinct from souls, distinct from matter. (Note: The concept of Brahman in Dvaita Vedanta is so similar to the monotheistic eternal God, that some early colonial–era Indologists such as George Abraham Grierson suggested Madhva was influenced by early Christians who migrated to India, but later scholarship has rejected this theory.) In Dvaita Vedanta, an individual soul must feel attraction, love, attachment and complete devotional surrender to Vishnu for salvation, and it is only His grace that leads to redemption and salvation. Once liberated, souls reach the abode of Vishnu, Vaikuntha, with each soul experiencing a unique amount of bliss. Madhva believed that some souls are eternally doomed and damned, a view not found in Advaita and Vishishtadvaita Vedanta. While the Vishishtadvaita Vedanta asserted "qualitative monism and quantitative pluralism of souls", Madhva asserted both "qualitative and quantitative pluralism of souls".

=== Shuddhādvaita ===
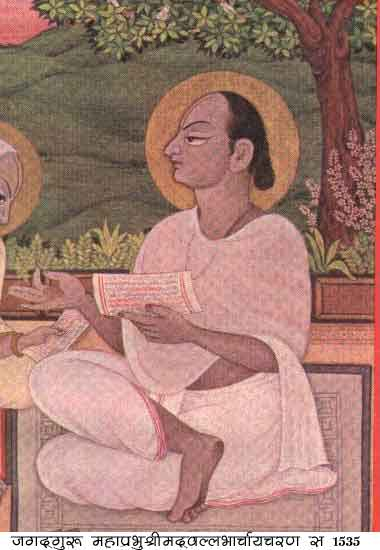
Vallabhacharya

Shuddhadvaita (pure non-dualism), propounded by Vallabhacharya (1479–1531 CE), states that the entire universe is real and is subtly Brahman only in the form of Krishna. Vallabhacharya agreed with Advaita Vedanta's ontology, but emphasized that prakriti (empirical world, body) is not separate from the Brahman, but just another manifestation of the latter. Everything, everyone, everywhere – soul and body, living and non-living, jīva and matter – is the eternal Krishna. The way to Krishna, in this school, is bhakti. Vallabha opposed renunciation of monistic sannyasa as ineffective and advocates the path of devotion (bhakti) rather than knowledge (jnana). The goal of bhakti is to turn away from ego, self-centered-ness and deception, and to turn towards the eternal Krishna in everything continually offering freedom from samsara.

== History ==
The history of Vedanta can be divided into two periods: one prior to the composition of the Brahma Sutras and the other encompassing the schools that developed after the Brahma Sutras were written. Until the 11th century, Vedanta was a peripheral school of thought.

=== Before the Brahma Sutras (before the 5th century) ===
Little is known of schools of Vedanta existing before the composition of the Brahma Sutras (first composition c. 2nd cent. BCE, final redaction 400–450 CE). (Note: Nicholson (2010, p. 26) considers the Brahma Sutras as a group of sutras composed by multiple authors over the course of hundreds of years. The precise date is disputed. Nicholson (2010, p. 26) estimates that the book was composed in its current form between 400 and 450 CE. The reference shows BCE, but it's a typo in Nicholson's book) It is clear that Badarayana, the writer of Brahma Sutras, was not the first person to systematize the teachings of the Upanishads, as he quotes six Vedantic teachers before him – Ashmarathya, Badari, Audulomi, Kashakrtsna, Karsnajini and Atreya. References to other early Vedanta teachers – Brahmadatta, Sundara, Pandaya, Tanka and Dravidacharya – are found in secondary literature of later periods. The works of these ancient teachers have not survived, but based on the quotes attributed to them in later literature, Sharma postulates that Ashmarathya and Audulomi were Bhedabheda scholars, Kashakrtsna and Brahmadatta were Advaita scholars, while Tanka and Dravidacharya were either Advaita or Viśiṣṭādvaita scholars.

=== Brahma Sutras (completed in the 5th century) ===
Badarayana summarized and interpreted teachings of the Upanishads in the Brahma Sutras, also called the Vedanta Sutra, (Note: The Vedanta–sūtra are known by a variety of names, including (1) Brahma–sūtra, (2) Śārīraka–sutra, (3) Bādarāyaṇa–sūtra and (4) Uttara–mīmāṁsā.) possibly "written from a Bhedābheda Vedāntic viewpoint." Badarayana summarized the teachings of the classical Upanishads (Note: Estimates of the date of Bādarāyana's lifetime differ. Pandey 2000, p. 4) and refuted the rival philosophical schools in ancient India like the sāṃkhya system. The Brahma Sutras laid the basis for the development of Vedanta philosophy.

Though attributed to Badarayana, the Brahma Sutras were likely composed by multiple authors over the course of hundreds of years. The estimates on when the Brahma Sutras were complete vary, with Nakamura in 1989 and Nicholson in his 2013 review stating, that they were most likely compiled in the present form around 400–450 CE. (Note: Nicholson 2013, p. 26 Quote: "From a historical perspective, the Brahmasutras are best understood as a group of sutras composed by multiple authors over the course of hundreds of years, most likely composed in its current form between 400 and 450 BCE." This dating has a typo in Nicholson's book, it should be read "between 400 and 450 CE") Isaeva suggests they were complete and in current form by 200 CE, while Nakamura states that "the great part of the Sutra must have been in existence much earlier than that" (800–500 BCE).

The book is composed of four chapters, each divided into four-quarters or sections. These sutras attempt to synthesize the diverse teachings of the Upanishads. However, the cryptic nature of aphorisms of the Brahma Sutras have required exegetical commentaries. These commentaries have resulted in the formation of numerous Vedanta schools, each interpreting the texts in its own way and producing its own commentary.

=== Between the Brahma Sutras and Adi Shankara (5th–8th centuries) ===
Little with specificity is known of the period between the Brahma Sutras (5th century CE) and Adi Shankara (8th century CE). Only two writings of this period have survived: the Vākyapadīya, written by Bhartṛhari (second half 5th century,) and the Kārikā written by Gaudapada (early 6th or 7th century CE).

Shankara mentions 99 different predecessors of his school in his commentaries. A number of important early Vedanta thinkers have been listed in the Siddhitraya by Yamunācārya (c. 1050), the Vedārthasamgraha by Rāmānuja (c. 1050–1157), and the Yatīndramatadīpikā by Śrīnivāsa Dāsa. At least fourteen thinkers are known to have existed between the composition of the Brahma Sutras and Shankara's lifetime. (Note: Bhartŗhari (c. 450–500), Upavarsa (c. 450–500), Bodhāyana (c. 500), Tanka (Brahmānandin) (c. 500–550), Dravida (c. 550), Bhartŗprapañca (c. 550), Śabarasvāmin (c. 550), Bhartŗmitra (c. 550–600), Śrivatsānka (c. 600), Sundarapāndya (c. 600), Brahmadatta (c. 600–700), Gaudapada (c. 640–690), Govinda (c. 670–720), Mandanamiśra (c. 670–750))

A noted scholar of this period was Bhartriprapancha. Bhartriprapancha maintained that the Brahman is one and there is unity, but that this unity has varieties. Scholars see Bhartriprapancha as an early philosopher in the line who teach the tenet of Bhedabheda. Bhedābheda means "difference and non-difference" and is more a tradition than a school of Vedanta. The schools of this tradition emphasize that the individual self (Jīvatman) is both different and not different from Brahman. Notable figures in this tradition are Nimbārka (7th century) who founded the Dvaitadvaita school, Bhāskara (8th–9th century), Ramanuja's teacher Yādavaprakāśa, Chaitanya (1486–1534) who founded the Achintya Bheda Abheda school, and Vijñānabhikṣu (16th century). (Note: According to Nakamura and Dasgupta, the Brahmasutras reflect a Bhedabheda point of view, the most influential tradition of Vedanta before Shankara. Numerous Indologists, including Surendranath Dasgupta, Paul hacker, Hajime Nakamura, and Mysore Hiriyanna, have described Bhedabheda as the most influential school of Vedanta before Shankara.)

=== Gaudapada, Adi Shankara (Advaita Vedanta) (6th–9th centuries) ===
Influenced by Buddhism, Advaita vedanta departs from the bhedabheda-philosophy, instead postulating the identity of Atman with the Whole (Brahman),

==== Gaudapada ====
Gaudapada (c. 6th century CE), was the teacher or a more distant predecessor of Govindapada, the teacher of Adi Shankara. Shankara is widely considered as the apostle of Advaita Vedanta. Gaudapada's treatise, the Kārikā – also known as the Māṇḍukya Kārikā or the Āgama Śāstra – is the earliest surviving complete text on Advaita Vedanta. (Note: There is ample evidence, however, to suggest that Advaita was a thriving tradition by the start of the common era or even before that. Shankara mentions 99 different predecessors of his Sampradaya. Scholarship since 1950 suggests that almost all Sannyasa Upanishads have a strong Advaita Vedanta outlook. Six Sannyasa Upanishads – Aruni, Kundika, Kathashruti, Paramahamsa, Jabala and Brahma – were composed before the 3rd Century CE, likely in the centuries before or after the start of the common era; the Asrama Upanishad is dated to the 3rd Century. The strong Advaita Vedanta views in these ancient Sannyasa Upanishads may be, states Patrick Olivelle, because major Hindu monasteries of this period belonged to the Advaita Vedanta tradition.)

Gaudapada's Kārikā relied on the Mandukya, Brihadaranyaka and Chhandogya Upanishads. In the Kārikā, Advaita (non-dualism) is established on rational grounds (upapatti) independent of scriptural revelation; its arguments are devoid of all religious, mystical or scholastic elements. Scholars are divided on a possible influence of Buddhism on Gaudapada's philosophy. (Note: Scholars like Raju (1992, p. 177), following the lead of earlier scholars like Sengupta, believe that Gaudapada co-opted the Buddhist doctrine that ultimate reality is pure consciousness (vijñapti-mātra). Raju (1992, pp. 177–178) states, "Gaudapada wove [both doctrines] into a philosophy of the Mandukaya Upanisad, which was further developed by Shankara." Nikhilananda (2008, pp. 203–206) states that the whole purpose of Gaudapada was to present and demonstrate the ultimate reality of Atman, an idea denied by Buddhism. According to Murti (1955, pp. 114–115), Gaudapada's doctrines are unlike Buddhism. Gaudapada's influential text consists of four chapters: Chapters One, Two, and Three are entirely Vedantin and founded on the Upanishads, with little Buddhist flavor. Chapter Four uses Buddhist terminology and incorporates Buddhist doctrines but Vedanta scholars who followed Gaudapada through the 17th century, state that both Murti and Richard King never referenced nor used Chapter Four, they only quote from the first three. While there is shared terminology, the doctrines of Gaudapada and Buddhism are fundamentally different, states Murti (1955, pp. 114–115)) The fact that Shankara, in addition to the Brahma Sutras, the principal Upanishads and the Bhagvad Gita, wrote an independent commentary on the Kārikā proves its importance in Vedāntic literature.

==== Adi Shankara ====
Adi Shankara (c.800–c.850), elaborated on Gaudapada's work and more ancient scholarship to write detailed commentaries on the Prasthanatrayi and the Kārikā. The Mandukya Upanishad and the Kārikā have been described by Shankara as containing "the epitome of the substance of the import of Vedanta". It was Shankara who integrated Gaudapada work with the ancient Brahma Sutras, "and give it a locus classicus" alongside the realistic strain of the Brahma Sutras. (Note: Nicholson (2010, p. 27) writes: "The Brahmasutras themselves espouse the realist Parinamavada position, which appears to have been the view most common among early Vedantins.")

While he is often revered as the most important Indian philosopher, the historical influence of his works on Hindu intellectual thought has been questioned. The historical Shankara probably was a relatively unknown Vaishnavite, and reliable information on Shankara's actual life is scant. His true impact lies in his "iconic representation of Hindu religion and culture," despite the fact that most Hindus do not adhere to Advaita Vedanta.

A noted contemporary of Shankara was Maṇḍana Miśra, who regarded Mimamsa and Vedanta as forming a single system and advocated their combination known as Karma-jnana-samuchchaya-vada. (Note: According to Mishra, the sutras, beginning with the first sutra of Jaimini and ending with the last sutra of Badarayana, form one compact shastra.) The treatise on the differences between the Vedanta school and the Mimamsa school was a contribution of Adi Shankara. Advaita Vedanta rejects rituals in favour of renunciation, for example.

=== Early Vaishnavism Vedanta (7th–9th centuries) ===
Early Vaishnava Vedanta retains the tradition of bhedabheda, equating Brahman with Vishnu or Krishna.

==== Nimbārka and Dvaitādvaita ====
Nimbārka (7th century) sometimes identified with Bhāskara, propounded Dvaitādvaita or Bhedābheda.

==== Bhāskara and Upadhika ====
Bhāskara (8th–9th century) also taught Bhedabheda. In postulating Upadhika, he considers both identity and difference to be equally real. As the causal principle, Brahman is considered non-dual and formless pure being and intelligence. The same Brahman, manifest as events, becomes the world of plurality. Jīva is Brahman limited by the mind. Matter and its limitations are considered real, not a manifestation of ignorance. Bhaskara advocated bhakti as dhyana (meditation) directed toward the transcendental Brahman. He refuted the idea of Maya and denied the possibility of liberation in bodily existence.

=== Vaishnavism Bhakti Vedanta (11th–16th centuries) ===
The Bhakti movement of late medieval Hinduism started in the 7th century, but rapidly expanded after the 12th century. It was supported by the Puranic literature such as the Bhagavata Purana, poetic works, as well as many scholarly bhasyas and samhitas.

This period saw the growth of Vashnavism Sampradayas (denominations or communities) under the influence of scholars such as Ramanujacharya, Vedanta Desika, Madhvacharya and Vallabhacharya. Bhakti poets or teachers such as Manavala Mamunigal, Namdev, Ramananda, Surdas, Tulsidas, Eknath, Tyagaraja, Chaitanya Mahaprabhu and many others influenced the expansion of Vaishnavism. These Vaishnavism sampradaya founders challenged the then dominant Shankara's doctrines of Advaita Vedanta, particularly Ramanuja in the 12th century, Vedanta Desika and Madhva in the 13th, building their theology on the devotional tradition of the Alvars (Shri Vaishnavas), and Vallabhacharya in the 16th century.

In North and Eastern India, Vaishnavism gave rise to various late Medieval movements: Ramananda in the 14th century, Sankaradeva in the 15th and Vallabha and Chaitanya in the 16th century.

==== Ramanuja (Vishishtadvaita Vedanta) (11th–12th centuries) ====
Rāmānuja (1017–1137 CE) was the most influential philosopher in the Viśiṣṭādvaita tradition. As the philosophical architect of Vishishtadvaita, he taught qualified non-dualism. Ramanuja's teacher, Yadava Prakasha, followed the Advaita monastic tradition. Tradition has it that Ramanuja disagreed with Yadava and Advaita Vedanta, and instead followed Nathamuni and Yāmuna. Ramanuja reconciled the Prasthanatrayi with the theism and philosophy of the Vaishnava Alvars poet-saints. Ramanuja wrote a number of influential texts, such as a bhasya on the Brahma Sutras and the Bhagavad Gita, all in Sanskrit.

Ramanuja presented the epistemological and soteriological importance of bhakti, or the devotion to a personal God (Vishnu in Ramanuja's case) as a means to spiritual liberation. His theories assert that there exists a plurality and distinction between Atman (souls) and Brahman (metaphysical, ultimate reality), while he also affirmed that there is unity of all souls and that the individual soul has the potential to realize identity with the Brahman. Vishishtadvaiata provides the philosophical basis of Sri Vaishnavism.

Ramanuja was influential in integrating Bhakti, the devotional worship, into Vedanta premises.

==== Madhva (Tattvavada or Dvaita Vedanta)(13th–14th centuries) ====
Tattvavada (Note: Madhvacharya gave his philosophy the name Tattvavada (realistic point of view or realism), but later after few centuries it was popularised as Dvaita Vedanta (dualism).) or Dvaita Vedanta was propounded by Madhvacharya (1238–1317 CE). (Note: Many sources date him to 1238–1317 period, but some place him over 1199–1278 CE.) He presented the opposite interpretation of Shankara in his Dvaita, or dualistic system. In contrast to Shankara's non-dualism and Ramanuja's qualified non-dualism, he championed unqualified dualism. Madhva wrote commentaries on the chief Upanishads, the Bhagavad Gita and the Brahma Sutra.

Madhva started his Vedic studies at age seven, joined an Advaita Vedanta monastery in Dwarka (Gujarat), studied under guru Achyutrapreksha, frequently disagreed with him, left the Advaita monastery, and founded Dvaita. Madhva and his followers Jayatirtha and Vyasatirtha, were critical of all competing Hindu philosophies, Jainism and Buddhism, but particularly intense in their criticism of Advaita Vedanta and Adi Shankara.

Dvaita Vedanta is theistic and it identifies Brahman with Narayana, or more specifically Vishnu, in a manner similar to Ramanuja's Vishishtadvaita Vedanta. But it is more explicitly pluralistic. Madhva's emphasis for difference between soul and Brahman was so pronounced that he taught there were differences (1) between material things; (2) between material things and souls; (3) between material things and God; (4) between souls; and (5) between souls and God. He also advocated for a difference in degrees in the possession of knowledge. He also advocated for differences in the enjoyment of bliss even in the case of liberated souls, a doctrine found in no other system of Indian philosophy.

==== Chaitanya Mahaprabhu (Achintya Bheda Abheda) (16th century) ====
Achintya Bheda Abheda (Vaishnava), founded by Chaitanya Mahaprabhu (1486–1534 CE), was propagated by Gaudiya Vaishnava. Historically, it was Chaitanya Mahaprabhu who founded congregational chanting of holy names of Krishna in the early 16th century after becoming a sannyasi.

=== Modern times (19th century – present) ===
==== Swaminarayan and Akshar-Purushottam Darshan (19th century) ====
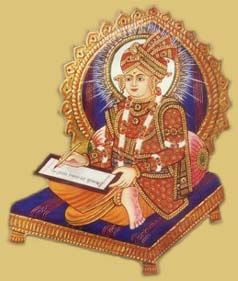
Swaminarayan

The Swaminarayan Darshana, which is rooted in Ramanuja's Vishishtadvaita, (Note: Vishishtadvaita roots: * Supreme Court of India, 1966 AIR 1119, 1966 SCR (3) 242: "Philosophically, Swaminarayan was a follower of Ramanuja" * Hanna H. Kim: "The philosophical foundation for Swaminarayan devotionalism is the viśiṣṭādvaita, or qualified non-dualism, of Rāmānuja (1017–1137 ce)." * See also Similarities with Ramanuja.) was founded in 1801 by Swaminarayan (1781–1830 CE), and is contemporarily most notably propagated by BAPS. It asserts that Parabrahman (Purushottam, Narayana) and Aksharbrahman are two distinct eternal realities. Adherents believe that they can achieve moksha (liberation) by becoming aksharrup (or brahmarup), that is, by attaining qualities similar to Akshar (or Aksharbrahman) and worshipping Purushottam (or Parabrahman; the supreme living entity; God).

Due to the commentarial work of Bhadreshdas Swami, the Akshar-Purushottam teachings were recognized as a distinct school of Vedanta by the Shri Kashi Vidvat Parishad in 2017 and by members of the 17th World Sanskrit Conference in 2018. (Note: "Professor Ashok Aklujkar said [...] Just as the Kashi Vidvat Parishad acknowledged Swaminarayan Bhagwan's Akshar-Purushottam Darshan as a distinct darshan in the Vedanta tradition, we are honored to do the same from the platform of the World Sanskrit Conference [...] Professor George Cardona [said] "This is a very important classical Sanskrit commentary that very clearly and effectively explains that Akshar is distinct from Purushottam.") Swami Paramtattvadas describes the Akshar-Purushottam teachings as "a distinct school of thought within the larger expanse of classical Vedanta," presenting the Akshar-Purushottam teachings as a seventh school of Vedanta.

==== Neo-Vedanta (19th century) ====
Neo-Vedanta, variously called as "Hindu modernism", "neo-Hinduism", and "neo-Advaita", is a term that denotes some novel interpretations of Hinduism that developed in the 19th century, presumably as a reaction to the colonial British rule. King (2002, pp. 129–135) writes that these notions accorded the Hindu nationalists an opportunity to attempt the construction of a nationalist ideology to help unite the Hindus to fight colonial oppression. Western orientalists, in their search for its "essence", attempted to formulate a notion of "Hinduism" based on a single interpretation of Vedanta as a unified body of religious praxis. This was contra-factual as, historically, Hinduism and Vedanta had always accepted a diversity of traditions. King (1999, pp. 133–136) asserts that the neo-Vedantic theory of "overarching tolerance and acceptance" was used by the Hindu reformers, together with the ideas of Universalism and Perennialism, to challenge the polemic dogmatism of Judaeo-Christian-Islamic missionaries against the Hindus.

The neo-Vedantins argued that the six orthodox schools of Hindu philosophy were perspectives on a single truth, all valid and complementary to each other. Halbfass (2007, p. 307) sees these interpretations as incorporating western ideas into traditional systems, especially Advaita Vedanta. It is the modern form of Advaita Vedanta, states King (1999, p. 135), the neo-Vedantists subsumed the Buddhist philosophies as part of the Vedanta tradition (Note: Vivekananda, clarifies Richard King, stated, "I am not a Buddhist, as you have heard, and yet I am"; but thereafter Vivekananda explained that "he cannot accept the Buddhist rejection of a self, but nevertheless honors the Buddha's compassion and attitude towards others".) and then argued that all the world religions are same "non-dualistic position as the philosophia perennis", ignoring the differences within and outside of Hinduism. According to Gier (2000, p. 140), neo-Vedanta is Advaita Vedanta which accepts universal realism:

Ramakrishna, Vivekananda and Aurobindo have been labeled neo-Vedantists (the latter called it realistic Advaita), a view of Vedanta that rejects the Advaitins' idea that the world is illusory. As Aurobindo phrased it, philosophers need to move from 'universal illusionism' to 'universal realism', in the strict philosophical sense of assuming the world to be fully real.

A major proponent in the popularization of this Universalist and Perennialist interpretation of Advaita Vedanta was Vivekananda, who played a major role in the revival of Hinduism. He was also instrumental in the spread of Advaita Vedanta to the West via the Vedanta Society, the international arm of the Ramakrishna Order.

===== Criticism of Neo-Vedanta label =====
Nicholson (2010, p. 2) writes that the attempts at integration which came to be known as neo-Vedanta were evident as early as between the 12th and the 16th century−

... certain thinkers began to treat as a single whole the diverse philosophical teachings of the Upanishads, epics, Puranas, and the schools known retrospectively as the "six systems" (saddarsana) of mainstream Hindu philosophy. (Note: The tendency of "a blurring of philosophical distinctions" has also been noted by Mikel Burley. Lorenzen locates the origins of a distinct Hindu identity in the interaction between Muslims and Hindus, and a process of "mutual self-definition with a contrasting Muslim other", which started well before 1800.)

Matilal criticizes Neo-Hinduism as an oddity developed by West-inspired Western Indologists and attributes it to the flawed Western perception of Hinduism in modern India. In his scathing criticism of this school of reasoning, Matilal (2002, pp. 403–404) says:

The so-called 'traditional' outlook is in fact a construction. Indian history shows that the tradition itself was self-conscious and critical of itself, sometimes overtly and sometimes covertly. It was never free from internal tensions due to the inequalities that persisted in a hierarchical society, nor was it without confrontation and challenge throughout its history. Hence Gandhi, Vivekananda and Tagore were not simply 'transplants from Western culture, products arising solely from confrontation with the west. ...It is rather odd that, although the early Indologists' romantic dream of discovering a pure (and probably primitive, according to some) form of Hinduism (or Buddhism as the case may be) now stands discredited in many quarters; concepts like neo-Hinduism are still bandied about as substantial ideas or faultless explanation tools by the Western 'analytic' historians as well as the West-inspired historians of India.

== Influence ==
According to Nakamura (2004, p. 3), the Vedanta school has had a historic and central influence on Hinduism:

The prevalence of Vedanta thought is found not only in philosophical writings but also in various forms of (Hindu) literature, such as the epics, lyric poetry, drama and so forth. ... the Hindu religious sects, the common faith of the Indian populace, looked to Vedanta philosophy for the theoretical foundations for their theology. The influence of Vedanta is prominent in the sacred literatures of Hinduism, such as the various Puranas, Samhitas, Agamas and Tantras ...

Frithjof Schuon summarizes the influence of Vedanta on Hinduism as follows:

The Vedanta contained in the Upanishads, then formulated in the Brahma Sutra, and finally commented and explained by Shankara, is an invaluable key for discovering the deepest meaning of all the religious doctrines and for realizing that the Sanatana Dharma secretly penetrates all the forms of traditional spirituality.

Gavin Flood states,

... the most influential school of theology in India has been Vedanta, exerting enormous influence on all religious traditions and becoming the central ideology of the Hindu renaissance in the nineteenth century. It has become the philosophical paradigm of Hinduism "par excellence".

=== Hindu traditions ===
Vedanta, adopting ideas from other orthodox (āstika) schools, became the most prominent school of Hinduism. Vedanta traditions led to the development of many traditions in Hinduism. Sri Vaishnavism of south and southeastern India is based on Ramanuja's Vishishtadvaita Vedanta. Ramananda led to the Vaishnav Bhakti Movement in north, east, central and west India. This movement draws its philosophical and theistic basis from Vishishtadvaita. A large number of devotional Vaishnavism traditions of east India, north India (particularly the Braj region), west and central India are based on various sub-schools of Bhedabheda Vedanta. Advaita Vedanta influenced Krishna Vaishnavism in the northeastern state of Assam. The Madhva school of Vaishnavism found in coastal Karnataka is based on Dvaita Vedanta.

Āgamas, the classical literature of Shaivism, though independent in origin, show Vedanta association and premises. Of the 92 Āgamas, ten are (dvaita) texts, eighteen (bhedabheda), and sixty-four (advaita) texts. While the Bhairava Shastras are monistic, Shiva Shastras are dualistic. Isaeva (1995, pp. 134–135) finds the link between Gaudapada's Advaita Vedanta and Kashmir Shaivism evident and natural. Tirumular, the Tamil Shaiva Siddhanta scholar, credited with creating "Vedanta–Siddhanta" (Advaita Vedanta and Shaiva Siddhanta synthesis), stated, "becoming Shiva is the goal of Vedanta and Siddhanta; all other goals are secondary to it and are vain."

Shaktism, or traditions where a goddess is considered identical to Brahman, has similarly flowered from a syncretism of the monist premises of Advaita Vedanta and dualism premises of Samkhya–Yoga school of Hindu philosophy, sometimes referred to as Shaktadavaitavada (literally, the path of nondualistic Shakti).

=== Influence on Western thinkers ===
An exchange of ideas has been taking place between the western world and Asia since the late 18th century as a result of colonization of parts of Asia by Western powers. This also influenced western religiosity. The first translation of Upanishads, published in two parts in 1801 and 1802, significantly influenced Arthur Schopenhauer, who called them the consolation of his life. He drew explicit parallels between his philosophy, as set out in The World as Will and Representation, and that of the Vedanta philosophy as described in the work of Sir William Jones. Early translations also appeared in other European languages. Influenced by Śaṅkara's concepts of Brahman (God) and māyā (illusion), Lucian Blaga often used the concepts marele anonim (the Great Anonymous) and cenzura transcendentă (the transcendental censorship) in his philosophy.

Paul Deussen, influenced by Schopenhauer, elevated Indian philosophy, particularly Advaita Vedanta, within German idealism and Indology. His works, including those on history of philosophy and Upanishad translations, portrayed Vedanta as the core of Indian thought, shaping 20th century scholarship. Deussen upheld Advaita as the original truth and acknowledged variations like Visistadvaita and Dvaita. He proposed a six-stage regression model tracing philosophy's decline from monistic idealism to realism and theism, paralleling Indian and Greek traditions.

==== Similarities with Spinoza's philosophy ====
German Sanskritist Theodore Goldstücker was among the early scholars to notice similarities between the religious conceptions of the Vedanta and those of the Dutch Jewish philosopher Baruch Spinoza, writing that Spinoza's thought was

... so exact a representation of the ideas of the Vedanta, that we might have suspected its founder to have borrowed the fundamental principles of his system from the Hindus, did his biography not satisfy us that he was wholly unacquainted with their doctrines [...] comparing the fundamental ideas of both we should have no difficulty in proving that, had Spinoza been a Hindu, his system would in all probability mark a last phase of the Vedanta philosophy.

Max Müller noted the striking similarities between Vedanta and the system of Spinoza, saying,

The Brahman, as conceived in the Upanishads and defined by Sankara, is clearly the same as Spinoza's 'Substantia'."

Helena Blavatsky, a founder of the Theosophical Society, also compared Spinoza's religious thought to Vedanta, writing in an unfinished essay,

As to Spinoza's Deity – natura naturans – conceived in his attributes simply and alone; and the same Deity – as natura naturata or as conceived in the endless series of modifications or correlations, the direct outflowing results from the properties of these attributes, it is the Vedantic Deity pure and simple.

== See also ==
- Mahajanas
- Badarayana
- Monistic idealism
- List of teachers of Vedanta
- Śāstra pramāṇam in Hinduism

== Sources ==
=== Printed sources ===
- Ādidevānanda, Swami (2014). Śrī Rāmānuja GĪTĀ Bhāșya, with Text and English translation. Chennai: Sri Ramakrishna Math, Mylapore, Chennai. ISBN 978-81-7823-518-9.
- Aksharananddas, Sadhu; Bhadreshdas, Sadhu (2016). Swaminarayan's Brahmajnana as Aksarabrahma-Parabrahma-Darsanam. Oxford University Press. doi:10.1093/acprof:oso/9780199463749.003.0011. ISBN 978-0-19-908657-3.
- Balasubramanian, R. (2000). "Introduction". In Chattopadhyana (ed.). History of Science, Philosophy and Culture in Indian Civilization. Volume II Part 2: Advaita Vedanta. Delhi: Centre for Studies in Civilizations.
- Bartley, C.J. (2013). The Theology of Ramanuja : Realism and Religion. Routledge. ISBN 978-1-136-85306-7.
- Beck, Guy L. (2012), Alternative Krishnas: Regional and Vernacular Variations on a Hindu Deity, State University of New York Press, ISBN 978-0-7914-8341-1
- Bernard, Theos (1947). Hindu Philosophy. Delhi: Motilal Banarsidass. ISBN 978-81-208-1373-1.
- Betty, Stafford (2010). "Dvaita, Advaita, and Viśiṣṭādvaita: Contrasting Views of Mokṣa". Asian Philosophy. 20 (2): 215–224. doi:10.1080/09552367.2010.484955. S2CID 144372321.
- Bhawuk, D.P.S. (2011). Anthony J. Marsella (ed.). Spirituality and Indian Psychology. Springer. ISBN 978-1-4419-8109-7.
- Blavatsky, H.P. (1982). Collected Writings. Vol. 13. Wheaton, IL: Theosophical Publ. House. ISBN 978-0-8356-0229-7.
- Brooks, Douglas Renfrew (1990). The Secret of the Three Cities. State University of Chicago Press. ISBN 978-0-226-07569-3.
- Bryant, Edwin (2007). Krishna : A Sourcebook. Oxford University Press. ISBN 978-0-19-514892-3.
- Burley, Mikel (2007). Classical Samkhya and Yoga: An Indian Metaphysics of Experience. Taylor & Francis.
- Carman, John B. (1994). Majesty and Meekness: A Comparative Study of Contrast and Harmony in the Concept of God. Wm. B. Eerdmans Publishing. ISBN 978-0-8028-0693-2.
- Carman, John B. (1974). The Theology of Rāmānuja: An essay in inter-religious understanding. Yale University Press. ISBN 978-0-300-01521-8.
- Carman, John; Narayanan, Vasudha (1989). The Tamil Veda: Pillan's Interpretation of the Tiruvaymoli. University of Chicago Press. ISBN 978-0-226-09306-2.
- Chari, S. M. Srinivasa (2004) [1988]. Fundamentals of Viśiṣṭādvaita Vedanta (Corr. ed.). Motilal Banarsidass. ISBN 978-81-208-0266-7.
  - Chari, S. M. Srinivasa (1988). Fundamentals of Viśiṣṭādvaita Vedanta. Motilal Banarsidass. ISBN 978-81-208-0266-7. OCLC 463617682.
- Chatterjee, Satischandra; Dutta, Shirendramohan (2007) [1939]. An Introduction to Indian Philosophy (Reprint ed.). Rupa Publications India. ISBN 978-81-291-1195-1.
- Clark, Matthew (2006), The Daśanāmī-saṃnyāsīs. The Integration Of Ascetic Lineages Into An Order, BRILL
- Clayton, John (2006). Religions, Reasons and Gods: Essays in Cross-cultural Philosophy of Religion. Cambridge University Press. ISBN 978-1-139-45926-6.
- Clooney, Francis X. (2000). Ultimate Realities: A Volume in the Comparative Religious Ideas Project. State University of New York Press. ISBN 978-0-7914-4775-8.
- Comans, Michael (2000). The Method of Early Advaita Vedānta: A Study of Gauḍapāda, Śaṅkara, Sureśvara, and Padmapāda. Motilal Banarsidass. ISBN 978-81-208-1722-7.
- Cornille, Catherine (2019). "Is all Hindu theology comparative theology?". Harvard Theological Review. 112 (1): 126–132. doi:10.1017/S0017816018000378. ISSN 0017-8160. S2CID 166549059.
- Craig, Edward (2000). Concise Routledge Encyclopedia of Philosophy. Routledge. ISBN 978-0-415-22364-5.
- Dandekar, R. (1987), "Vedanta", MacMillan Encyclopedia of religion
- Das, A.C. (1952). "Brahman and Māyā in Advaita Metaphysics". Philosophy East and West. 2 (2): 144–154. doi:10.2307/1397304. JSTOR 1397304.
- Dasgupta, Surendranath (2012) [1922]. A History of Indian Philosophy. Vol. 1, Philosophy of Buddhist, Jaina and Six Systems of indian thought (Reprint, 7th ed.). Motilal Banarsidass. ISBN 978-81-208-0412-8.
- Davis, Richard (2014). Ritual in an Oscillating Universe: Worshipping Siva in Medieval India. Princeton University Press. ISBN 978-0-691-60308-7.
- von Dehsen, Christian (1999). Philosophers and Religious Leaders. Routledge. ISBN 978-1-57356-152-5.
- von Dense, Christian D. (1999). Philosophers and Religious Leaders. Greenwood Publishing Group.
- Deutsch, Eliot; Dalvi, Rohit (2004). The Essential Vedanta: A New Source Book of Advaita Vedanta. World Wisdom, Inc. ISBN 978-0-941532-52-5.
- Doyle, Sean (2006). Synthesizing the Vedanta: The Theology of Pierre Johanns, S.J. Peter Lang. ISBN 978-3-03910-708-7.
- Dyczkowski, Mark (1989). The Canon of the Śaivāgama. Motilal Banarsidass. ISBN 978-81-208-0595-8.
- Etter, Christopher (2006). A Study of Qualitative Non-Pluralism. iUniverse. ISBN 978-0-595-39312-1.
- Flood, Gavin Dennis (1996). An Introduction to Hinduism. Cambridge University Press.
- Fowler, Jeaneane D. (2002). Perspectives of Reality: An Introduction to the Philosophy of Hinduism. Sussex Academic Press. ISBN 978-1-898723-94-3.
- Gajendragadkar, P. (1966), Supreme Court of India: Sastri Yagnapurushadji And ... vs Muldas Brudardas Vaishya And ... on 14 January, 1966. 1966 AIR 1119, 1966 SCR (3) 242
- Gier, Nicholas F. (2000). Spiritual Titanism: Indian, Chinese, and Western Perspectives. State University of New York Press. ISBN 978-0-7914-4528-0.
- Goldstucker, Theodore (1879). Literary Remains of the Late Professor Theodore Goldstucker. London: W. H. Allen & Co.
- Grimes, John A. (2006). A Concise Dictionary of Indian Philosophy: Sanskrit Terms Defined in English. State University of New York Press. ISBN 978-0-7914-3067-5.
- Grimes, John A. (1990). The Seven Great Untenables: Sapta-vidhā Anupapatti. Motilal Banarsidass. ISBN 978-81-208-0682-5.
- Gupta, Bina (1995). Perceiving in Advaita Vedānta: Epistemological Analysis and Interpretation. Motilal Banarsidass. pp. 137–166. ISBN 978-81-208-1296-3.
- Gupta, Ravi M. (2016). Caitanya Vaisnava Philosophy: Tradition, Reason and Devotion. Routledge. ISBN 978-1-317-17017-4.
- Gupta, Ravi M. (2007). Caitanya Vaisnava Vedanta of Jīva Gosvami's Catursutri tika. Routledge. ISBN 978-0-415-40548-5.
- Gupta, Ravi; Valpey, Kenneth (2013). The Bhagavata Purana: Sacred Text and Living Tradition. Columbia University Press. ISBN 978-0-231-14999-0.
- Halbfass, Wilhelm (2007). "Research and reflection: Responses to my respondents. V. Developments and attitudes in Neo-Hinduism; Indian religion, past and present (Responses to Chapters 4 and 5)". In Franco, Eli; Preisendanz, Karin (eds.). Beyond Orientalism: the work of Wilhelm Halbfass and its impact on Indian and cross-cultural studies. Delhi: Motilal Banarsidass. ISBN 978-81-208-3110-0.
- Hawley, John Stratton (2015). A Storm of Songs: India and the Idea of the Bhakti Movement. Harvard University Press. ISBN 978-0-674-18746-7.
- Hiriyanna, M. (2008) [1948]. The Essentials of Indian Philosophy (Reprint ed.). Delhi: Motilal Banarsidass. ISBN 978-81-208-1330-4. OCLC 889316366.
- Indich, William M. (1995). Consciousness in Advaita Vedanta. Motilal Banarsidass. ISBN 978-81-208-1251-2.
- Isaeva, N.V. (1992). Shankara and Indian Philosophy. State University of New York Press. ISBN 978-0-7914-1281-7.
- Isaeva, Natalia (1993). Shankara and Indian Philosophy. Albany: State University of New York Press (SUNY). ISBN 978-0-7914-1281-7. Some editions spell the author Isayeva.
- Isaeva, N.V. (1995). From Early Vedanta to Kashmir Shaivism: Gaudapada, Bhartrhari, and Abhinavagupta. State University of New York Press. ISBN 978-0-7914-2449-0.
- Iţu, Mircia (2007). "Marele Anonim şi cenzura transcendentă la Blaga. Brahman şi māyā la Śaṅkara" [The Great Anonymous and the transcendent censorship at Blaga. Brahman and māyā at Śaṅkara]. Caiete Critice (in Romanian). 6–7 (236–237). Bucharest: 75–83. ISSN 1220-6350..
- Jackson, W.J. (1992), "A Life Becomes a Legend: Sri Tyagaraja as Exemplar", Journal of the American Academy of Religion, 60 (4): 717–736, doi:10.1093/jaarel/lx.4.717, JSTOR 1465591
- Jackson, W.J. (1991), Tyagaraja: Life and Lyrics, Oxford University Press, USA
- Jaimini (1999). Mīmāṃsā Sūtras of Jaimini. Translated by Mohan Lal Sandal (Reprint ed.). Motilal Banarsidass. ISBN 978-81-208-1129-4.
- Jones, Constance; Ryan, James D. (2006). Encyclopedia of Hinduism. Infobase Publishing.
- Johnson, W.J. (2009). A Dictionary of Hinduism. Oxford University Press. ISBN 978-0-19-861025-0.
- Jones, Sir William (1801). "On the Philosophy of the Asiatics". Asiatic Researches. Vol. 4. pp. 157–173.
- Kim, Hanna H. (2005), "Swaminarayan movement", MacMillan Encyclopedia of Religion
- King, Richard (1995). Early Advaita Vedānta and Buddhism: The Mahāyāna Context of the Gauḍapādīya-kārikā. SUNY Press.
- King, Richard (1999). Orientalism and Religion: Post-Colonial Theory, India and "The Mystic East". Routledge.
- King, Richard (2001). Orientalism and Religion: Post-Colonial Theory, India and 'The Mystic East'. Taylor & Francis e-Library.
- King, Richard (2002). Orientalism and Religion: Post-Colonial Theory, India and "The Mystic East". Taylor & Francis e-Library.
- Klostermaier, Klaus K. (1984). Mythologies and Philosophies of Salvation in the Theistic Traditions of India. Wilfrid Laurier University Press. ISBN 978-0-88920-158-3.
- Koller, John M. (2013). "Shankara". In Meister, Chad; Copan, Paul (eds.). Routledge Companion to Philosophy of Religion. Routledge.
- Kulandran, Sabapathy; Hendrik, Kraemer (2004). Grace in Christianity and Hinduism. James Clarke & Co. ISBN 978-0-227-17236-0.
- Lochtefeld, James (2000). The Illustrated Encyclopedia of Hinduism, Vol. 1: A–M. Rosen Publishing. ISBN 978-0-8239-3179-8.
- Lipner, Julius J. (1986). The Face of Truth: A Study of Meaning and Metaphysics in the Vedantic Theology of Ramanuja. State University of New York Press. ISBN 978-0-88706-038-0.
- Lorenzen, David N. (2006). Who Invented Hinduism: Essays on Religion in History. Yoda Press. ISBN 978-81-902272-6-1.
- Maharaj, Ayon (2020). The Bloomsbury Research Handbook of Vedanta. Bloomsbury.
- Mahony, William (1997). The Artful Universe: An Introduction to the Vedic Religious Imagination. State University of New York Press. ISBN 978-0-7914-3580-9.
- Malkovsky, B. (2001), The Role of Divine Grace in the Soteriology of Śaṁkarācārya, BRILL
- Manninezhath, Thomas (1993). Harmony of Religions: Vedānta Siddhānta Samarasam of Tāyumānavar. Motilal Banarsidass. ISBN 978-81-208-1001-3.
- Matilal, Bimal Krishna (2015) [2002]. Ganeri, Jonardon (ed.). The Collected Essays of Bimal Krishna Matilal. Vol. 1 (Reprint ed.). New Delhi: Oxford University Press. ISBN 978-0-19-946094-6.
  - Matilal, Bimal Krishna (2002). Ganeri, Jonardon (ed.). The Collected Essays of Bimal Krishna Matilal. Vol. 1. New Delhi: Oxford University Press. ISBN 978-0-19-564436-4.
- Mayeda, Sengaku (1992), "An Introduction to the Life and Thought of Sankara", in Mayeda, Sengaku (ed.), A Thousand Teachings: The Upadeśasāhasrī of Śaṅkara, State University of New York City Press, ISBN 0-7914-0944-9
- Mayeda, Sengaku (2006). A thousand teachings : the Upadeśasāhasrī of Śaṅkara. Motilal Banarsidass. ISBN 978-81-208-2771-4.
- McDaniel, June (2004). Offering Flowers, Feeding Skulls. Oxford University Press. ISBN 978-0-19-534713-5.
- Mukerji, Mādhava Bithika (1983). Neo-Vedanta and Modernity. Ashutosh Prakashan Sansthan.
- Muller, F. Max (2003). Three Lectures on the Vedanta Philosophy. Kessinger Publishing.
- Murti, T.R.V. (2008) [1955]. The central philosophy of Buddhism (Reprint ed.). Routledge. ISBN 978-0-415-46118-4.
  - Murti, T.R.V. (1955). The central philosophy of Buddhism. London: Allen & Unwin. OCLC 1070871178.
- Nakamura, Hajime (1990) [1949]. A History of Early Vedānta Philosophy, Part 1 (Reprint ed.). Delhi: Motilal Banarsidass. ISBN 978-81-208-0651-1.
  - Nakamura, Hajime (1989). A History of Early Vedānta Philosophy, Part 1. Delhi: Motilal Banarsidass. ISBN 978-81-208-0651-1. OCLC 963971598.
  - Nakamura, Hajime (1949). A History of Early Vedānta Philosophy. ,
- Nakamura, Hajime (2004) [1950]. A History of Early Vedānta Philosophy, Part 2 (Reprint ed.). Delhi: Motilal Banarsidass. ISBN 978-81-208-1963-4.
- Nelson, Lance (2007). "Krishna in Advaita Vedanta: The Supreme Brahman in Human Form". In Bryant, Edwin (ed.). Krishna - A Sourcebook. Oxford University Press.
- Nicholson, Andrew J. (2010). Unifying Hinduism: Philosophy and Identity in Indian Intellectual History. Columbia University Press. ISBN 978-0-231-14987-7.
- Nicholson, Andrew J. (2013). Unifying Hinduism: Philosophy and Identity in Indian Intellectual History. Columbia University Press. ISBN 978-0-231-14987-7.
- Neog, Maheswar (1980). Early History of the Vaiṣṇava Faith and Movement in Assam: Śaṅkaradeva and His Times. Motilal Banarsidass. ISBN 978-81-208-0007-6.
- Nikhilananda, Swami (2008). The Upanishads, A New Translation. Vol. 2. Kolkata: Advaita Ashrama. ISBN 978-81-7505-302-1.
- O'Flaherty, Wendy Doniger (1986). Dreams, Illusion, and Other Realities. University of Chicago Press. ISBN 978-0-226-61855-5.
- Olivelle, Patrick (1992). The Samnyasa Upanisads: Hindu Scriptures on Asceticism and Renunciation. Oxford University Press. ISBN 978-0-19-536137-7.
- Pandey, S. L. (2000). "Pre-Sankara Advaita". In Chattopadhyana (ed.). History of Science, Philosophy and Culture in Indian Civilization. Volume II Part 2: Advaita Vedanta. Delhi: Centre for Studies in Civilizations.
- Paramtattvadas, Sadhu (2017). An introduction to Swaminarayan Hindu theology. Cambridge University Press. ISBN 978-1-107-15867-2. OCLC 964861190.
- Paramtattvadas, Swami (October–December 2019). "Akshar-Purushottam School of Vedanta". Hinduism Today. Himalayan Academy.
- Pasricha, Ashu (2008). "The Political Thought of C. Rajagopalachari". Encyclopaedia of Eminent Thinkers. Vol. 15. New Delhi: Concept Publishing Company. ISBN 978-81-8069-495-0.
- Perrett, Roy W. (2013). Philosophy of Religion: Indian Philosophy. Routledge. ISBN 978-1-135-70322-6.
- Phillips, Stephen H. (1995). Classical Indian Metaphysics. Columbia University Press. ISBN 978-0-8126-9298-3.
- Potter, Karl (2002). Presuppositions of India's Philosophies. Motilal Banarsidass. ISBN 978-81-208-0779-2.
- Puligandla, Ramakrishna (1997). Fundamentals of Indian Philosophy. New Delhi: D. K. Printworld.
- Raju, P.T. (1992) [1972]. The Philosophical Traditions of India (Reprint ed.). Delhi: Motilal Banarsidass.
- Rambachan, A. (1991). Accomplishing the Accomplished: Vedas as a Source of Valid Knowledge in Sankara. University of Hawaii Press. ISBN 978-0-8248-1358-1.
- Ramnarace, Vijay (2014), Rādhā-Kṛṣṇa's Vedāntic Debut: Chronology & Rationalisation in the Nimbārka Sampradāya (PDF)
- Renard, Philip (2010). Non-Dualisme. De directe bevrijdingsweg. Cothen: Uitgeverij Juwelenschip.
- Rigopoulos, Antonio (1998). Dattatreya: The Immortal Guru, Yogin, and Avatara. State University of New York Press. ISBN 978-0-7914-3696-7.
- Roodurmum, Pulasth Soobah (2002). Bhāmatī and Vivaraṇa Schools of Advaita Vedānta: A Critical Approach. Delhi: Motilal Banarsidass.
- Sarma, Deepak (2000). "Is Jesus a Hindu? S.C. Vasu and Multiple Madhva Misrepresentations". Journal of Hindu-Christian Studies. 13. doi:10.7825/2164-6279.1228.
- Scharfe, Hartmut (2002). Handbook of Oriental Studies. Brill. ISBN 978-90-04-12556-8.
- Schomer, Karine; McLeod, W. H., eds. (1987). The Sants: Studies in a Devotional Tradition of India. Motilal Banarsidass. ISBN 978-81-208-0277-3.
- Schopenhauer, Arthur (1966). The World as Will and Representation, Vol. 1. Translated by Payne, E.F.J. Dover Publications. ISBN 978-0-486-21761-1.
- Schultz, Joseph P. (1981). Judaism and the Gentile Faiths: Comparative Studies in Religion. Fairleigh Dickinson University Press. ISBN 978-0-8386-1707-6.
- Schuon, Frithjof (1975). "One of the Great Lights of the World". In Mahadevan, T.M.P. (ed.). Spiritual Perspectives, Essays in Mysticism and Metaphysics. Arnold Heinemann. ISBN 978-0-89253-021-2.
- Sharma, Arvind (2007). Advaita Vedānta: An Introduction. Motilal Banarsidass. ISBN 978-81-208-2027-2.
- Sharma, Arvind (2008). Philosophy of religion and Advaita Vedanta: a comparative study in religion and reason. Pennsylvania State University Press. ISBN 978-0-271-02832-3. OCLC 759574543.
- Sharma, Chandradhar (2009) [1960]. A Critical Summary of Indian Philosophy. Delhi: Motilal Banarsidass. ISBN 978-81-208-0365-7. OCLC 884357528.
- Sharma, Chandradhar (1994) [1960]. A Critical Survey of Indian Philosophy (Reprint ed.). Motilal Banarsidass. ISBN 978-81-208-0365-7.
- Sharma, Chandradhar (2007) [1996]. The Advaita Tradition in Indian Philosophy: A Study of Advaita in Buddhism, Vedānta and Kāshmīra Shaivism (Rev. ed.). Motilal Banarsidass. ISBN 978-81-208-1312-0. OCLC 190763026.
  - Sharma, Chandradhar (1996). The Advaita Tradition in Indian Philosophy: A Study of Advaita in Buddhism, Vedānta and Kāshmīra Shaivism. Motilal Banarsidass. ISBN 978-81-208-1312-0. OCLC 1041414621.
- Sharma, B.N. Krishnamurti (2014) [1962]. Philosophy of Śrī Madhvācārya (Reprint ed.). Motilal Banarsidass. ISBN 978-81-208-0068-7.
  - Sharma, B.N. Krishnamurti (1962). Philosophy of Śrī Madhvācārya. Bombay: Bharatiya Vidya Bhavan March. OCLC 1075020345.
- Sharma, B. N. Krishnamurti (2000). A History of the Dvaita School of Vedānta and its Literature (Reprint, 3rd ed.). Motilal Banarsidass. ISBN 978-81-208-1575-9. OCLC 53463855.
- Sheridan, Daniel (1991). Timm, Jeffrey (ed.). Texts in Context: Traditional Hermeneutics in South Asia. State University of New York Press. ISBN 978-0-7914-0796-7.
- Sivananda, Swami (1993). All About Hinduism. The Divine Life Society. ISBN 81-7052-047-9.
- Smith, Bardwell L. (1976). Hinduism: New Essays in the History of Religions. Brill Archive. ISBN 978-90-04-04495-1.
- Smith, David (2003). The Dance of Siva: Religion, Art and Poetry in South India. Cambridge University Press. ISBN 978-0-521-52865-8.
- Sprockhoff, Joachim F. (1976). Samnyasa: Quellenstudien zur Askese im Hinduismus (in German). Wiesbaden: Kommissionsverlag Franz Steiner. ISBN 978-3-515-01905-7.
- Sullivan, Bruce M. (2001). The A to Z of Hinduism. Rowman & Littlefield. ISBN 978-0-8108-4070-6.
- Sydnor, Jon Paul (2012). Ramanuja and Schleiermacher: Toward a Constructive Comparative Theology. Casemate. ISBN 978-0-227-68024-7.
- Tola, Fernando (1989). "On the Date of Maṇḍana Miśra and Śaṅkara and Their Doctrinal Relation". Annals of the Bhandarkar Oriental Research Institute. 70 (1/4): 37–46. ISSN 0378-1143. JSTOR 41693459.
- Vasugupta (2012). Śiva Sūtras. Translated by Jaideva Singh. Motilal Banarsidass. ISBN 978-81-208-0407-4.
- Vitsaxis, Vassilis (2009). Thought and Faith: Comparative Philosophical and Religious Concepts in Ancient Greece, India, and Christianity: The Concept of Divinity: 2. Somerset Hall Press. ISBN 978-1-935244-05-9.
- Williams, Raymond Brady (2018), Introduction to Swaminarayan Hinduism, Cambridge University Press
- Witz, Klaus G. (1998). The Supreme Wisdom of the Upaniśads: An Introduction. Motilal Banarsidass. ISBN 978-81-208-1573-5.

=== Web sources ===
- Mohanty, Jitendra N.; Wharton, Michael (2011). "Indian philosophy - Historical development of Indian philosophy". Britannica.
- van Buitenin, J.A.B. (2010). "Ramanuja - Hindu theologian and philosopher". Britannica.
- Doniger, Wendy; Stefon, Matt (2015). "Vedanta, Hindu Philosophy". Britannica.
- Jagannathan, Devanathan (2011). "Gaudapada". Internet Encyclopedia of Philosophy.
- Stoker, Valerie (2011). "Madhva (1238-1317)". Internet Encyclopedia of Philosophy.
- Ranganathan, Shyam. "Hindu Philosophy". Internet Encyclopedia of Philosophy.
- Nicholson, Andrew J. "Bhedabheda Vedanta". Internet Encyclopedia of Philosophy.
