= Prasthanatrayi =

Three canonical texts of Vedanta theology

The Prasthanatrayi (Sanskrit: प्रस्थानत्रयी, IAST: Prasthānatrayī), which translates to "three sources" refers to the three canonical texts of Vedanta philosophy. The three texts are: the Principal Upanishads, the Bhagavad Gita, and the Brahma Sutras.

In traditional Vedantic hermeneutics, a foundational teacher (also known as an acharya) is required to compose a commentary on all three texts to prove their theological system.

== Etymology ==
The Sanskrit word prasthantrayi meaning "three sources" is derived from prasthan (prasthāna; starting point or source) and trayi (trayī, three).

== Classification ==
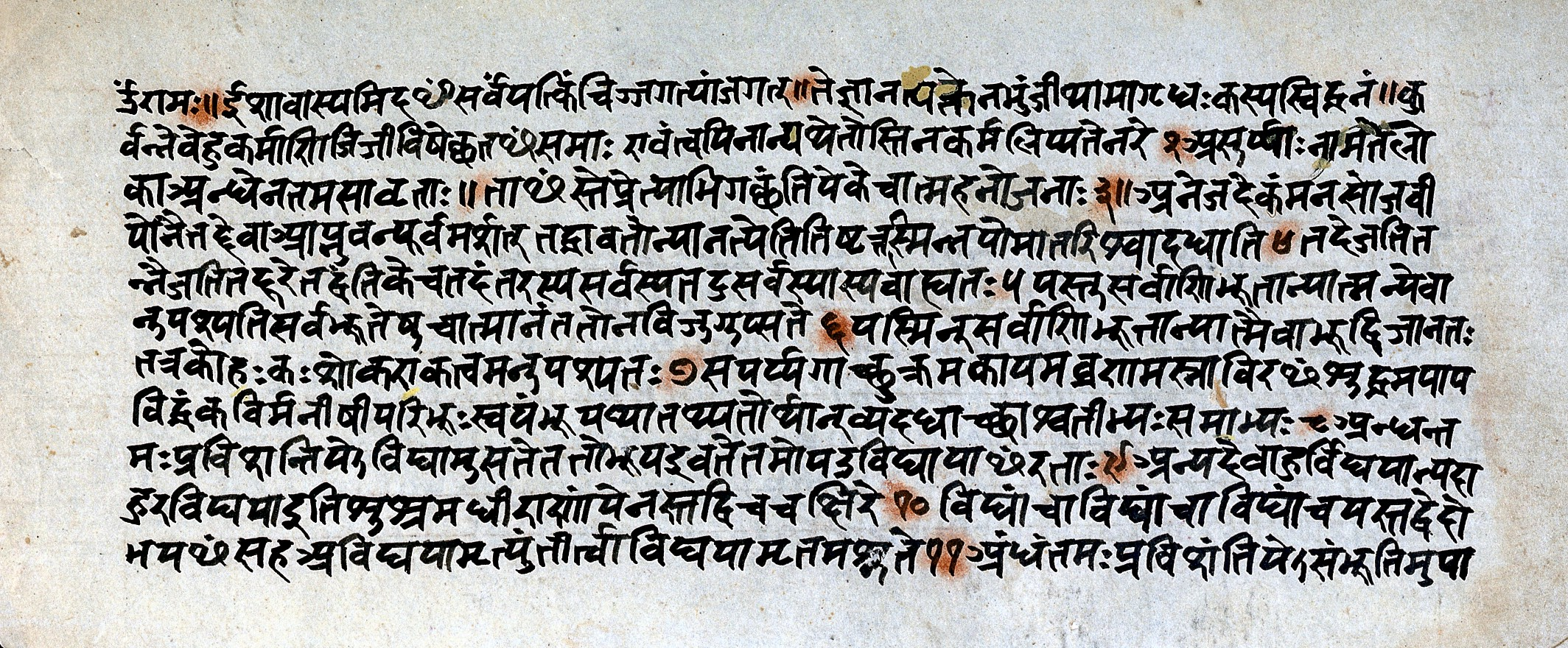
Manuscript of Isha Upanishad, one of the Principal Upanishads.

Prasthantrayi refers to the three foundational scriptures: the Principal Upanishads, the Shrimad Bhagavad Gita, and Brahmasutras.

=== Principal Upanishads ===
The 10 Principal Upanishads are classified as "shruti" text, meaning, "that which is heard". These texts are authoritative and contain themes on the ultimate reality and the self. These scriptures are also known the "shruti prasthana".

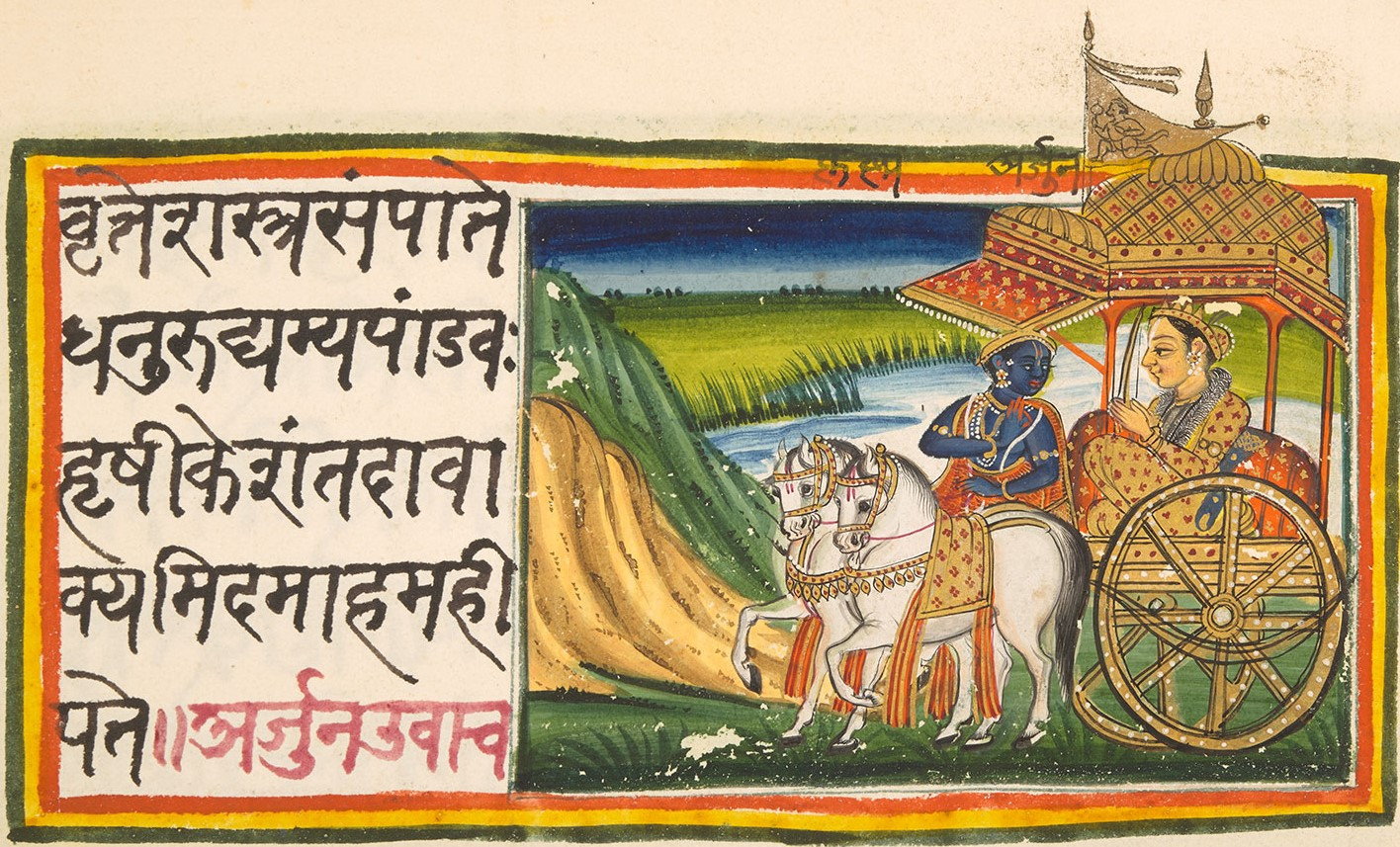
Bhagavad Gita manuscript with an illustration.

=== Bhagavad Gita ===
The Bhagavad Gita is classified as a "smruti" text, meaning "that which is remembered". The Bhagavad Gita provides practical and ethical lessons with spiritual disciplines required to realize the truths articulated in the Upanishads. The Bhagavad Gita is also known as the "smruti prasthana".

=== Brahma Sutra ===
The Brahma Sutras, also known as "Vedanta Sutras", is classified as "nyaya", meaning "logical synthesis". Written by Badarayana, the aphorisms text provides a logical synthesis of the verses found in the Upanishads through structured reasoning. This text is also known as the "nyaya prasthana" or "tarka prasthana".

== Role in Vedanta ==
The development of classical Vedanta philosophies occur through curating commentaries on the Prasthantrayi. In traditional Vedantic hermeneutics, a foundational teacher (also known as an acharya) is required to compose a commentary on all three texts to prove their theological system.

== See also ==
- Hindu philosophy
- Śāstra pramāṇam in Hinduism
