= Harivyas Devacharya =

Saint from India

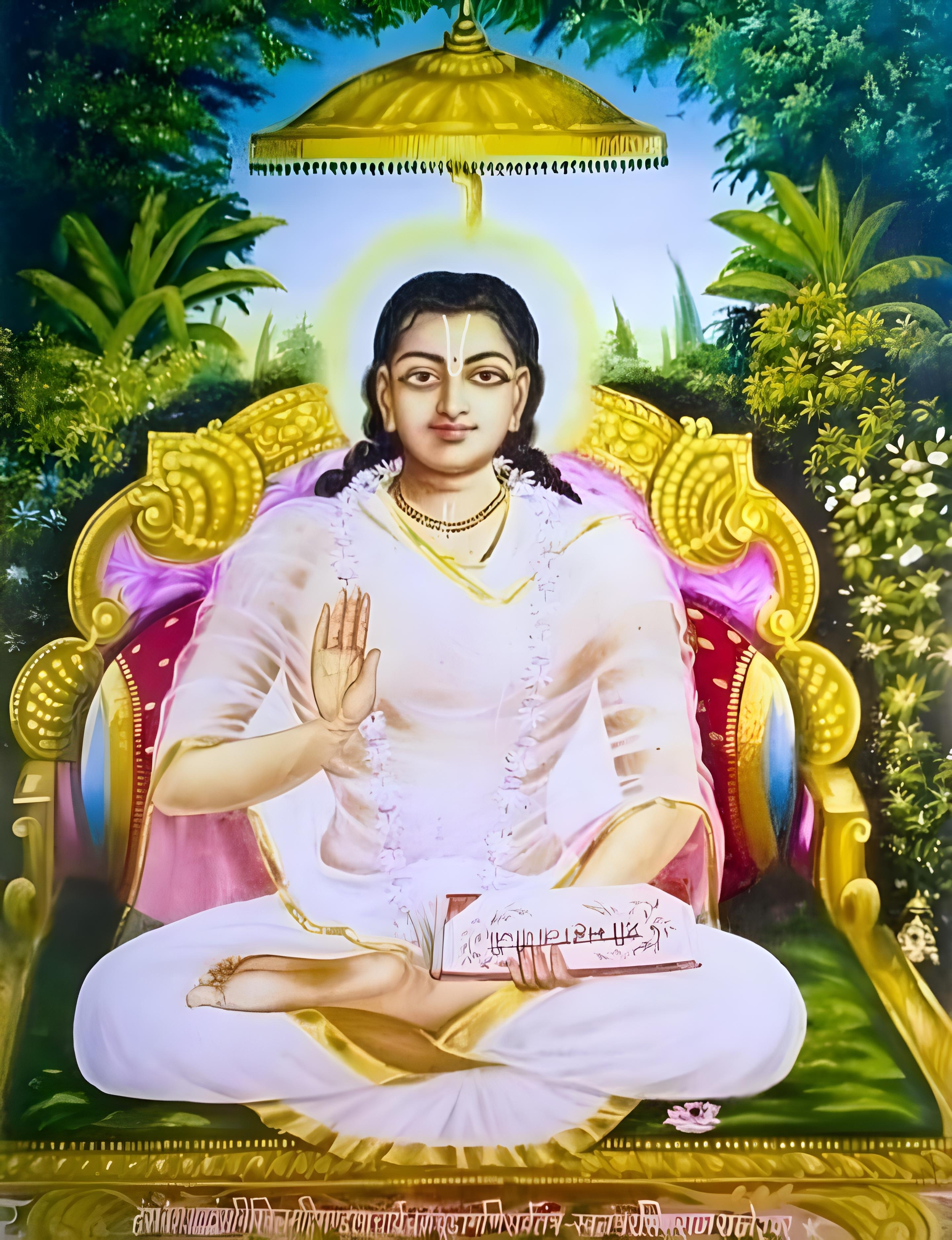
- Sri Harivyasa Devacharya ji
- Preceded by: Śrībhaṭṭa Devāchārya
- Succeeded by: 12 main disciples

Personal life
- Born: c. 1443 CE Mathura
- Died: c. 1543 CE
- Era: c. 15-16th Century
- Region: South Asia
- Notable work(s): Vedānta Siddhānta ratnāñjalih, Mahāvāṇī

Religious life
- Religion: Hinduism
- Philosophy: Svābhāvika Bhedābheda
- Sect: Nimbarka Sampradaya

Harivyas Devacharya (c. 15th Century) also known as Harivyasadeva (Sanskrit: हरिव्यास देवाचार्य, हरिव्यासदेव, romanized: Harivyāsa devāchārya, Harivyāsa) was an Indian philosopher, theologian and poet. Born into a Gaud brahmin family, he became the 35th āchārya of the Nimbārka Sampradāya. Residing in the sacred town of Vrindavana, he was a disciple of Śrī Śrībhaṭṭa Devāchārya ji and his nom-de-plume was Hari Priyā. He also played a pivotal role in expanding the reach of the Nimbārka Sampradāya by sending twelve main disciples on missionary journeys across Indian Subcontinent, each establishing their own sub-lineage, some of which continue to thrive today.

== Life ==
Harivyāsa Devāchārya, born into a Gaur Brahmin family, is commemorated annually on the twelfth day of Kartik’s waxing moon. All the Nimbārkīs prior to Harivyāsa were likely trained in regions such as South India or Kashmir. In contrast, Harivyāsa, a Gauḍa-brāhmaṇa from Mathurā, chose to pursue his education in Vārāṇasi. Following the traditional brāhmaṇical custom, Harivyāsa would have begun his formal studies in Kāśī at the age of eight, completing them by the time he reached twenty-two.

A disciple of Śrī Śrībhaṭṭa Devāchārya, he was entrusted by his guru to compose a detailed commentary on the "Yugal Shatak," known as 'Mahavani.' This work elaborates on the sentiments expressed in the Yugal Shatak's couplets through lyrical commentary. His influence led to the saints of his tradition being called 'Harivyāsī.' His samadhi is located in Mathurā at 'Nārada Tīlā,' where a statue of Nārada Ji is installed.

Under him, there were 12 disciples, after whom the 12 dvāra (i.e., branches) of the tradition were established:

1. Śrī Svabhūrāma Devāchārya
2. Śrī Paraśurāma Devāchārya
3. Śrī Vohita Devāchārya
4. Śrī Madanagopāla Devāchārya
5. Śrī Uddhavaghamaṇḍa Devāchārya
6. Śrī Vāhula Devāchārya
7. Śrī Laparāgopāla Devāchārya
8. Śrī Hṛṣīkeśa Devāchārya
9. Śrī Mādhava Devāchārya
10. Śrī Keśava Devāchārya
11. Śrī Gopāla Devāchārya
12. Śrī Mukunda Devāchārya

=== Initiation by Durgā ===
Harivyāsa devāchārya is linked with many extraordinary occurrences, The most renowned of these is his initiation by goddess Durgā in the village of Caṭathāvala, an event famously recounted in the Nābhā dāsa Bhaktamāla chappaya 77. Nābhā dāsa wrote that "It is a matter of great wonder that a celestial goddess, who roams the heavens, made a disciple of a human. Saints, imbued with a sense of renunciation and deep devotion to the lotus feet of Shyāmsundar, always surrounded him in great abundance. Among these saints, Śrī Harivyāsa shone resplendently, much like King Janaka of Videha shone amidst sages like Yajnavalkya and other enlightened beings. Due to his reverent service at the feet of his guru, Śrī Śrībhaṭṭa, the entire world bowed before him. Through the spiritual power of devotion to Hari, he was once even accepted as a disciple of the great goddess."

== Dating ==
Kṛṣṇadeva, a Pāñcarātrika scholar, authored a ritual manual titled Nṛsiṁhaparicaryā. Gopinath Kaviraj, noted a manuscript of this work in the Sarasvatī Bhavana library at the Government Sanskrit College, Vārāṇasi. This manuscript was part of a collection previously owned by Mahīdhara, a Mādhyandinīya Śuklayajurveda commentator who acquired it in 1583 CE. The collection was later donated to the library. Manuscript annotations indicate that it was transcribed by ‘Harivyāsadeva’ in V.S. 1525 (1468 CE). Based on this evidence, Narayandutt Sharma concluded that Harivyāsa devacharya lived approximately between 1443 CE and 1543 CE.

The suggested date of Harivyāsa’s death can be corroborated through the following reasoning. In the lineage of Svabhūrāma Devāchārya, Harivyāsa’s eldest disciple, Caturacintāmaṇi Nāgājī is mentioned in Nābhādāsa’s Bhaktamāla chappaya 148 as a contemporary figure: "Caturacintāmaṇī Nāgājī resides in a house in the kuñja at this time." Based on this, Nāgājī’s lifespan is estimated to be approximately 1550–1630. Accordingly, his predecessor, Paramānanda Devāchārya, likely lived from 1520–1600; his teacher, Karṇahara Devāchārya, from 1500–1570; and his preceptor, Svabhūrāma Devāchārya, from 1480–1550. Svabhūrāma is noted to have been significantly older than Paraśurāma Devāchārya. This chronology aligns with the assumption that Harivyāsa passed away around 1540.

== Works ==
Works of Harivyasa Devacharya:

- Prema bhaktivivardhinī – A Sanskrit commentary on Śrī Nimbārkaṣṭottaraśatanāma (108 names of Śrī Nimbārka) of Sadānandabhaṭṭa.
- Śrī Gopāla Paddhati – The ritual manual.
- Mahāvāṇī (Mahavani) – The famous Braj language lyrical composition Śrīmadbhagavad Bhava Padāvalī, commentary on his preceptor Śrībhaṭṭa’s Yugalaśataka.
- Vedānta Siddhānta ratnāñjalih (Vedanta Siddhanta Ratnanjali) – commentary on Vedanta Kamadhenu dashashloki of Nimbarkacharya. It is further commented by Dr Swami Dwarkadasa kathia baba.

== Mahāvāṇī ==
Mahāvāṇī is well recognized text in braj bhasha it has five chapters.

The five chapters of the Mahāvāṇī are:

- Sevā Sukha (128 padas), which describes the daily routine of Rādhā-Kṛṣṇa, the ever-enchanting Shri Radha-Krishna is described through the eightfold service (aṣṭayāma-sevā). The essence of 'Sevā Sukha' lies in the deep immersion in devotion in the mood of sakhī (female friend), becoming one with the beloved couple, engaged in their service throughout the eight watches of the day.
- Utsāha Sukha (189 padas) detailing the celebration of the various festivals,
- Surata Sukha (106 padas) revealing the intimate pastimes. According to this, the ever-joyful Rādhā-Kṛṣṇa remain immersed in each other's ocean of love—this is the ultimate state of divine ecstasy.
- Sahaja Sukha (107 padas) In these padas it is described that Even while being together, there are moments of turmoil due to the fear of separation; at times, immersed in deep emotions, there is an intense eagerness to meet swiftly.
- Siddhānta Sukha (44 padas) which summarises the philosophical position of the nikuñja līlā meditations. Within this, there is a deep description of the Vaishnav principles, such as the object of worship (upāsya-tattva), the explanation of the abode of Lord (dhāma-tattva), and the names of the divine female friends (sakhī-nāmāvalī), among others.

== Bibliography ==
- Kaviraj, Gopinath (1965). काशी की सारस्वत साधना (in Hindi). Bihāra-Rāshṭrabhāshā-Parishad.
- Upadhyay, Baladeva (1978). Vaishnava Sampradayon ka Siddhanta aur Sahitya. Varanasi: Chowkhamba Amarbharati Prakashan.
- Dasgupta, Surendranath (1988). A history of Indian philosophy. Delhi: Motilal Banarsidass. ISBN 978-81-208-0408-1.
- Sharma, Narayanadutt (1990). Nimbarka Sampradaya aur unka Krishna bhakta hindi kavi.
- Catherine, Clémentin-Ojha (1990). "La renaissance du Nimbarka Sampradaya au XVIe siècle. Contribution à l'étude d'une secte Krsnaïte". Journal Asiatique (in French). 278. doi:10.2143/JA.278.3.2011219.
- Ramkrishnadev Garga, Nabha das ji, Priya Das ji (2004). Bhaktamāla of Nābhādāsa, with Bhaktirasabodhinī commentary of Priyādāsa, Hindi translation and gloss by Ramkrishnadev Garga (in Sanskrit and Hindi). Vṛndāvana.
- Bhandarkar, R. G. (2014). Vaisnavism, Saivism and Minor Religious Systems (Routledge Revivals). Routledge. ISBN 978-1-317-58933-4.
- Agrawal, Madan Mohan (2013). Encyclopedia of Indian philosophies, Bhedābheda and Dvaitādvaita systems. Encyclopedia of Indian philosophies / general ed.: Karl H. Potter. Delhi: Motilal Banarsidass. ISBN 978-81-208-3637-2.
- Ramnarace, Vijay (2014). Rādhā-Kṛṣṇa's Vedāntic Debut: Chronology& Rationalisation in the Nimbārka Sampradāya (PDF) (PhD thesis). University of Edinburgh.
- Prakash, Dr Ravi (2022). Religious Debates in Indian Philosophy. K.K. Publications.
