= Purushottamacharya =

9th century Indian vedantic philosopher

- Preceded by: Viśvācārya
- Succeeded by: Vilāsācārya

Personal life
- Born: Puruṣottama c. 800 CE India
- Died: c. 880 CE
- Era: c. 9th Century
- Region: South Asia
- Notable work: Vedāntaratnamañjūṣā

Religious life
- Religion: Hinduism
- Philosophy: Svābhāvika Bhedābheda
- Sect: Nimbarka Sampradaya

Purushottamacharya (Sanskrit: पुरुषोत्तमाचार्य, पुरुषोत्तम, romanized: Puruṣottamācārya, Puruṣottama; c. 9th century) also known as Purushottama, was a vedantic philosopher and theologian. He was a disciple of Viśvācārya and the third after Nimbarka. He was 7th acharya of Nimbarka Sampradaya. Purushottamacharya composed Vedāntaratnamañjūṣā, a commentary on Nimbārkācharya's work Vedanta kamadhenu dashashloki.

== Life ==
Puruṣottama, believed to have originated from the same region as Nimbārka, which corresponds to Pratiṣṭhāna in present-day Paithan, Maharashtra. He was born on the sixth day of the bright fortnight of the lunar month Caitra (approximately February-March in the Gregorian calendar).

He is also referred to as Vivaraṇakāra, meaning The Expositor, a title that signifies his role in elucidating and deeply analyzing complex theological principles and intricate aspects of philosophy with clarity and precision. He flourished after Śaṅkara, as he criticises many full-fledged Advaita doctrines.

== Works ==
- Vedāntaratnamañjūṣā (Vedanta Ratna Manjusha) – A detailed commentary on Nimbarkacharya's work Vedanta Kamadhenu dashashloki.
- Siddhānta-kṣirārṇava – A lost work.

== Polemical Contributions ==
Puruṣottama's works represent the earliest recorded polemical engagements with Advaita philosophy within the tradition. In addition to critiquing Advaita, he also refuted key tenets of other prominent schools of thought, including Pūrvamīmāṁsā, Nyāya, Cārvāka, and Sāṁkhya.

=== Critique of Advaita ===
Puruṣottama systematically challenged various foundational doctrines of Advaita Vedānta. His arguments targeted concepts such as ekajīvavāda (the theory of a single empirical self), vibhuparimāṇavāda (the doctrine of single all pervading self), upādhivāda (the theory of limiting adjuncts), adhyāsavāda (the theory of superimposition), pratibimbavāda (the theory of reflection), nirguṇa-brahmavāda (the doctrine of attributeless Brahman), nirviśeṣa-brahmavāda (the doctrine of qualityless Brahman), jaganmithyāvāda (the doctrine of the world's illusory nature), and vivartavāda (the doctrine of apparent transformation).

== Vedāntaratnamañjūṣā ==
The Vedāntaratnamañjūṣā is an erudite commentary on the Daśaślokī, consisting of four chapters modelled on the themes of the four chapters of the Brahmasūtra, and containing the very first polemical debates with advaita recorded in the tradition.

=== Śaraṇāgati ===
Śaraṇāgati is the complete entrusting of one's own self to the infinitely merciful Lord through the means recommended by the good, when one is convinced of one's incapacity for resorting to other sādhanas like knowledge and the rest. Puruṣottama enumerated the six constituent elements of Śaraṇāgati (total surrender) in Vedāntaratnamañjūṣā:

- The resolve to treat everyone with good will and friendliness, being convinced of the great truth that everyone and everything, down to as tuft of grass, deserves respect.
- Discarding what is contrary to the above solemn determination, i.e. refraining from all violence, malice, back- biting, falsehood, etc.
- Strong faith in the protection of the Lord.
- Praying to the Lord for protection, being aware of the fact that the Lord, though all-merciful, does not release anyone who does not pray to Him but is, on the contrary, adverse to Him
- Discarding all false pride and sense of egoity, i.e. assuming an attitude of utter humility
- Complete entrusting of one's own self and whatever belongs to one's self to the Lord, being convinced that such a complete resignation of the 'I' and the 'mine' to the Lord alone induce the mercy and grace of the Lord.

=== Influence ===
Dara Shikoh, in his Samudra Sangama—a seminal text on Indo-Islamic synthetic and syncretic philosophy—delves into the exploration of affinities between Indic and Islamic traditions. He specifically examines the parallels in terminologies used for the sense-organs (indriyas) and their subtle objects (tanmatras). His analysis is grounded in the Vedantic framework, drawing extensively from the Vedāntaratnamañjūṣā, a key text that informs his critique and comparative approach.

== Bibliography ==
- Bose, Roma (2004). Vedānta-pārijāta-saurabha of Nimbārka and Vedānta-kaustubha of Śrīnivāsa: commentaries on the Brahma-sutras; English translation. New Delhi: Munshiram Manoharlal Publishers. ISBN 978-81-215-1121-6.
- Agrawal, Madan Mohan (2013). Encyclopedia of Indian philosophies, Bhedābheda and Dvaitādvaita systems. Encyclopedia of Indian philosophies / general ed.: Karl H. Potter. Delhi: Motilal Banarsidass. ISBN 978-81-208-3637-2.
- Bose, Roma (1954). A Critical Study of Dara Shikuch's Samudra-Sangama. Pracyavani Mandir, Calcutta.
- Dasgupta, Surendranath (1988). A history of Indian philosophy. Delhi: Motilal Banarsidass. ISBN 978-81-208-0408-1.
- Bhandarkar, R. G. (2014). Vaisnavism, Saivism and Minor Religious Systems (Routledge Revivals). Routledge. ISBN 978-1-317-58933-4.
- Ramnarace, Vijay (2014). Rādhā-Kṛṣṇa's Vedāntic Debut: Chronology & Rationalisation in the Nimbārka Sampradāya (PDF) (PhD thesis). University of Edinburgh.
- Tripathi, Radhavallabh (2021). Vāda in Theory and Practice: Studies in Debates, Dialogues and Discussions in Indian Intellectual Discourses. DK Printworld (P) Ltd. ISBN 978-81-246-1080-0.
- Klostermaier, Klaus K. (2014). A Concise Encyclopedia of Hinduism. Oneworld Publications. ISBN 978-1-78074-672-2.
