= Vedanta kamadhenu dashashloki =

Sanskrit hymn

Vedāntakāmadhenu daśaślokī
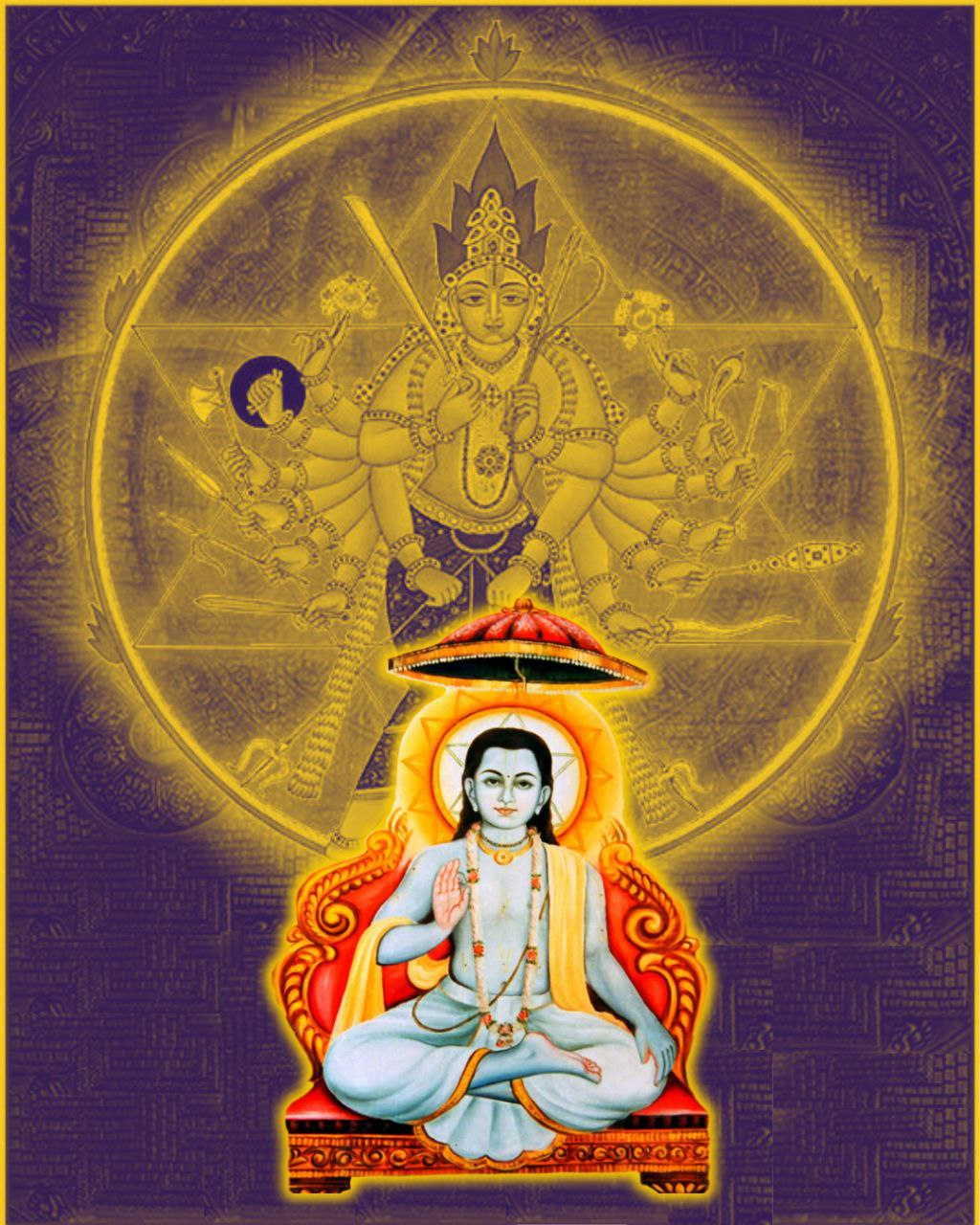
- Sudarśanāvatāra Śrī Nimbārkācharya Ji, The author of Vedāntakāmadhenu daśaślokī

Information
- Religion: Hinduism
- Author: Nimbarkacharya
- Language: Sanskrit
- Verses: 10

The Vedanta kamadhenu dashashloki (Sanskrit: वेदान्तकामधेनु दशश्लोकी, romanized: Vedāntakāmadhenu daśaślokī) is a Sanskrit hymn attributed to the Bhagavata philosopher Nimbarkacharya of the Nimbarka sect.

== Soteriology ==
The style of the "Daśaślokī" is very simple, suited to a devotee who does not want to be bothered with abstract logical theories and hair-splitting wranglings, but wants to have the truth immediately in a nut-shell.

== Shlokas ==
Nimbārka clarifies the characteristics of the individual soul, giving its size and qualities, stating from the very start that it is dependent upon Hari, which is a decidedly Vaiṣṇava view of Brahman.

Verse	Sanskrit text (Devanagari)	Transliteration	English translation
1	ज्ञानस्वरूपं च हरेरधीनं शरीरसंयोगवियोगयोग्यम्। अणुं हि जीवं प्रतिदेहभिन्नं ज्ञातृत्ववन्तं यदनन्तमाहुः ॥ १ ॥		The souls are infinite in number, have knowledge as their essence, and are infinitesimal and distinct in every body; they are entirely dependent on Lord Hari.
2	अनादिमायापरियुक्तरूपं त्वेनं विदुर्वै भगवत्प्रसादात्। मुक्तं च बद्धं किला बद्धमुक्तं प्रभेदबाहुल्यमथापि बोध्यम् ॥ २ ॥		Souls have been mixed with Maya since time immemorial and can only realize their true identity through God’s grace; there are three main types of souls: bound, ever-emancipated, and bound-liberated.
3	अप्राकृतं प्राकृतरूपकञ्च कालस्वरूपं तदचेतनं मतम्। मायाप्रधानादिपदप्रवाच्यं शुक्लादिभेदाश्च समेऽपि तत्र ॥ ३ ॥		the Lord's abode is described as non-phenomenal. Phenomena, effects, and time are all considered insentient. Prakriti, also called Maya or Pradhan, is said to possess three qualities: Sattva, Rajas, and Tamas, associated with the colors white, red, and yellow respectively.
4	स्वभावतोऽपास्तसमस्तदोषमशेषकल्याणगुणैकराशिम्। व्यूहाङ्गिनं ब्रह्म परं वरेण्यं ध्यायेम कृष्णं कमलेक्षणं हरिम् ॥ ४ ॥		One should meditate on Lord Krishna, who is described as having lotus eyes and being free from all defects. He is said to be the repository of divine qualities by nature. The text identifies him as Lord Vasudeva in the Chaturvyuha and worthy of worship.
5	अङ्गे तु वामे वृषभानुजां मुदा विराजमानामनुरूपसौभगाम्। सखीसहस्रैः परिसेवितां सदा स्मरेम देवीं सकलेष्टकामदाम् ॥ ५ ॥		One should remember Goddess Radha, who sits joyfully to the Lord's left, matches Him in beauty, is served by thousands of companions, and fulfills all the desires of devotees.
6	उपासनीयं नितरां जनैः सदा प्रहाणयेऽज्ञानतमोऽनुवृत्तेः। सनन्दनाद्यैर्मुनिभिस्तथोक्तं श्रीनारदायाखिलतत्त्वसाक्षिणे ॥ ६ ॥		All should constantly worship Radha-Krishna to destroy the darkness of ignorance, as instructed by the Sanaka brothers to Sage Narada.
7	सर्वं हि विज्ञानमतो यथार्थकं श्रुतिस्मृतिभ्यो निखिलस्य वस्तुनः। ब्रह्मात्मकत्वादिति वेदविन्मतं त्रिरूपताऽपि श्रुतिसूत्रसाधिता ॥ ७ ॥		The entire world, both sentient and insentient, is real and inseparable from Brahman; the scriptures confirm the reality of the trinity of subject, object, and instigator.
8	नान्या गतिः कृष्णपदारविन्दात् संदृश्यते ब्रह्मशिवादिवन्दितात्। भक्तेच्छयोपात्तसुचिन्त्यविग्रहा-चिन्त्यशक्तेरविचित्यसाश्रयात् ॥ ८ ॥		There is no other shelter besides the lotus feet of Lord Krishna, whose power is inconceivable and who is worshipped by Shiva and Brahma.
9	कृपास्य दैन्यादियुजि प्रजायते यया भवेत्प्रेम-विशेषलक्षणा। भक्तिर्ह्यनन्याधिपतेर्महात्मनः सा चोत्तमा साधनरूपिका परा ॥ ९ ॥		The Lord bestows his grace on those humble in heart, leading to two kinds of Bhakti: the initial practice and the supreme, unswerving divine love.
10	उपास्यरूपं तदुपासकस्य च कृपाफलं भक्तिरसस्ततः परम्। विरोधिनो रूपमथैतदाप्तर्ज्ञेया इमेऽर्था अपि पञ्च साधुभिः॥१०॥		Devotees must understand these five truths - arthapanchaka : the form of the Worshippable, the nature of the Worshipper, the fruit of grace - Moksha, the bliss of devotion, and the obstacles to attaining the Lord.

== Commentaries ==
The Vedānta kāmadhenu Daśaślokī have been extensively commented upon by several scholars. Among them, the three primary commentaries are:

- Vedāntaratnamañjūṣā of Śrī Puruṣottamāchārya
- Vedānta Siddhāntaratnāñjali of Śrī Harivyāsa Devāchārya
- Vedāntalaghumañjūṣā of Śrī Giridhara dāsa

== Bibliography ==
- Upadhyay, Baladeva (1978). Vaishnava Sampradayon ka Siddhanta aur Sahitya. Varanasi: Chowkhamba Amarbharati Prakashan.
- Dasgupta, Surendranath (1988). A history of Indian philosophy. Delhi: Motilal Banarsidass. ISBN 978-81-208-0408-1.
- Agrawal, Madan Mohan (2013). Encyclopedia of Indian philosophies, Bhedābheda and Dvaitādvaita systems. Encyclopedia of Indian philosophies / general ed.: Karl H. Potter. Delhi: Motilal Banarsidass. ISBN 978-81-208-3637-2.
- Bose, Roma (2004). Vedānta-pārijāta-saurabha of Nimbārka and Vedānta-kaustubha of Śrīnivāsa: commentaries on the Brahma-sutras; English translation. New Delhi: Munshiram Manoharlal Publishers. ISBN 978-81-215-1121-6.
- Bhandarkar, R. G. (2014). Vaisnavism, Saivism and Minor Religious Systems (Routledge Revivals). Routledge. ISBN 978-1-317-58933-4.
- Ramnarace, Vijay (2014). Rādhā-Kṛṣṇa's Vedāntic Debut: Chronology & Rationalisation in the Nimbārka Sampradāya (PDF) (PhD thesis). University of Edinburgh.
