= Srinivasacharya =

7th century Indian Vedantic Philosopher

- Preceded by: Nimbarkacharya
- Succeeded by: Viśvācārya

Personal life
- Born: Vidyānidhi c. 660 CE India
- Died: c. 740 CE
- Parents: Ācāryapāda (father); Lokamatī (mother)
- Era: c. 7-8 Century
- Region: South Asia
- Notable work(s): Vedanta Kaustubha, Laghustavarājastotram

Religious life
- Religion: Hinduism
- Philosophy: Svābhāvika Bhedābheda
- Sect: Nimbarka Sampradaya

Srinivasacharya (Sanskrit: श्रीनिवासाचार्य, श्रीनिवास, romanized: Śrīnivāsācārya, Śrīnivāsa;c. 7th century) also known as Srinivasa, was a Hindu philosopher and theologian. He was a disciple of Nimbārkacārya and an acharya of Nimbārka Sampradāya. Srinivasacharya composed Vedānta-Kaustubha (a commentary on the Brahma Sūtra) at the request of Nimbārkacārya. Srinivasacharya's philosophical framework, known as Svabhāvika Bhedābheda, emphasizes the natural distinction and similarity between the individual soul and the supreme being.

== Dating ==
The traditional view, as outlined in the Ācāryacaritam by Nārāyaṇaśaraṇa Deva (1643–1679 CE), holds that Srinivasacharya lived during the reign of Vajranābha, the great-grandson of Krishna. But modern scholars such as Madan Mohan Agarwal and Vijay Ramnarace, through a comparative analysis of his Brahma Sūtra commentary with those of other prominent commentators like Śaṅkarācārya, Bhāskarācārya, and Rāmānujācārya, have concluded that Srinivasacharya lived around c. 7th century. Scholars such as Professor R.V. Joshi, Swami Vrajavallabha Sharan, A.P. Bhattacharya, Baladeva dasa, and Swami Lalit Krishna Goswami Maharaj holds a similar perspective.

== Life ==
Traditionally, Srinivasacharya is regarded as an incarnation of Pañcajanya, the divine conch-shell of Viṣṇu (Śaṅkhāvatāra), and is believed to have lived during the reign of Vajranābha, the great-grandson of Kṛṣṇa, in Mathura.

Srinivasacharya is said to have been born in the hermitage of Nimbārkācārya on the fifth day of the bright half of the month of Māgha. His father was Ācāryapāda, and his mother was Lokamatī, both known for their learning and piety. According to tradition, Ācāryapāda, while on a mission to conquer the world through his scholarship, visited the hermitage of Nimbārka. As it was nearing sunset, he refused to accept any refreshment. In response, Nimbārka caused the setting sun to remain above a Nimba tree, allowing Ācāryapāda and his companions to complete their meal. Struck by this act, Ācāryapāda became Nimbārkācārya's disciple and continued to reside in the hermitage.

It is said that Nimbārkācārya personally taught Srinivasacharya the scriptures, dedicating his Vedānta pārijāta-saurabha to him and composing the Daśaślokī for his instruction. Nimbārka also taught him the Rādhāṣṭaka and Kṛṣṇāṣṭaka—eight verses each in praise of Rādhā and Kṛṣṇa, respectively. Tradition holds that, by reciting these verses under Nimbārkācārya's guidance, Srinivasacharya was granted a vision of Rādhā and Kṛṣṇa.

Accompanied by his disciple Viśvācārya, Srinivasacharya traveled extensively, spreading the Vaiṣṇava teachings and reportedly converting many people to the faith.

== Philosophy ==
Srinivasacharya's philosophy, Svābhāvika Bhedābheda, articulates a threefold reality that consists of:

- Brahman: The metaphysical ultimate reality and supreme controller.
- Cit: The sentient individual soul (Jivātman), which is the enjoyer.
- Acit: The non-sentient universe; or the object to be enjoyed.

In this framework, Brahman is the only svatantra tattva (independent reality), while the individual soul and the universe are paratantra tattva (dependent reality). This dependency does not imply complete dualism (dvaita), as in the philosophy of Madhvācārya, but shows a relationship of simultaneous difference and non-difference between Brahman, the soul, and the universe.

=== Brahman ===
Srinivasacharya regards Brahman as the universal soul, both transcendent and immanent, referred to by various names such as Śrī Kṛṣṇa, Viṣnu, Vāsudeva, Purushottama, Nārāyaņa, Paramatman, Bhagawan and so on. Similarly, Nimbārkācārya, in his Vedanta Kamadhenu Daśaślokī, refers to Śrī Kṛṣṇa alongside his consort Rādhā.

Brahman is the supreme being, the source of all auspicious qualities, and possesses unfathomable attributes. It is omnipresent, omniscient, the lord of all, and greater than all. None can be equal to or superior to Brahman. He is the creator, cause of creation, maintenance and destruction of the universe.

Srinivasacharya asserts that Brahman is saguṇa (with qualities). Therefore, he interprets scriptural passages that describe Brahman as nirguṇa (without qualities) differently as he argues that nirguṇa, when applied to Brahman, signifies the absence of inauspicious qualities, rather than the complete negation of all attributes. Similarly, terms like nirākāra (formless) are understood to denote the absence of an undesirable or inauspicious form. Srinivasacharya upheld the view that Śrī Kṛṣṇa possesses all auspicious attributes and that relative qualities such as virtue and vice, or auspiciousness and inauspiciousness, do not affect him.

=== Relationship ===
According to Srinivasacharya, the individual soul is neither entirely distinct (atyanta bheda) from Brahman nor completely identical (atyanta abheda) with it, but is instead considered a part of Brahman (aṃśā-aṃśī bhāva), using the part-whole analogy. However, this "part" should not be interpreted as a literal fragment, but rather as a manifestation of Brahman's power (śakti).

== Works ==
Srinivasacharya was the author of:

- Vedānta Kaustubha, which is a commentary on Nimbārkācārya's Vedānta Pārijāta Saurabha. Though Vedānta Parijāta Saurabha is itself a commentary on the Brahma Sūtras. Keśava Kāśmīrī Bhaṭṭācārya wrote a commentary on Vedānta Kaustubha, titled Vedānta Kaustubha Prabhā.
- Laghustavarājastotram, which is a 41-verse hymn dedicated to his preceptor, Nimbārka. Puruṣottamaprasāda Vaiṣṇava II wrote a commentary on Laghustavarājastotram, under the title: Gurubhaktimandākinī.
- Khyātinirnaya, is a lost work but it is referenced in Sundarabhaṭṭa's Siddhāntasetukātīkā.

== Bibliography ==
- Ramnarace, Vijay (2014). Rādhā-Kṛṣṇa's Vedāntic Debut: Chronology & Rationalisation in the Nimbārka Sampradāya (PDF) (PhD thesis). University of Edinburgh.
- Gupta, Tripta (2000). Vedānta-Kaustubha, a study (in English and Sanskrit). Delhi: Sanjay Prakashan. ISBN 978-81-7453-043-1.
- Radhakrishnan, Sarvepalli (2011). The Brahma Sutra: The Philosophy Of Spiritual Life. Literary Licensing, LLC. ISBN 978-1-258-00753-9.
- Bose, Roma (2004). Vedānta-pārijāta-saurabha of Nimbārka and Vedānta-kaustubha of Śrīnivāsa: commentaries on the Brahma-sutras; English translation. New Delhi: Munshiram Manoharlal Publishers. ISBN 978-81-215-1121-6.
- Agrawal, Madan Mohan (2013). Encyclopedia of Indian philosophies, Bhedābheda and Dvaitādvaita systems. Encyclopedia of Indian philosophies / general ed.: Karl H. Potter. Delhi: Motilal Banarsidass. ISBN 978-81-208-3637-2.
- Dasgupta, Surendranath (1988). A history of Indian philosophy. Delhi: Motilal Banarsidass. ISBN 978-81-208-0408-1.
- Bhandarkar, R. G. (2014). Vaisnavism, Saivism and Minor Religious Systems (Routledge Revivals). Routledge. ISBN 978-1-317-58933-4.
