= Devotional =

Devotional may refer to:

- Acts of devotion, especially those repeated regularly
- Devotional song, a hymn which accompanies religious observances and rituals
- Devotional (video), of the 1993 Depeche Mode tour
- Daily devotional, religious publication or practice

== See also ==
- Devotion (disambiguation)
- Devotional Songs, a 1992 studio album by Nusrat Fateh Ali Khan
- Devotional Tour, a 1993 concert tour by Depeche Mode
- Christian devotional literature, religious writing designed for personal edification and spiritual formation
- Filmi devotional songs, in Hindi movies
- Hindu devotional movements, various forms of Hinduism in India
