= Nimbarka Sampradaya =

One of the four Vaiṣṇava Sampradāyas

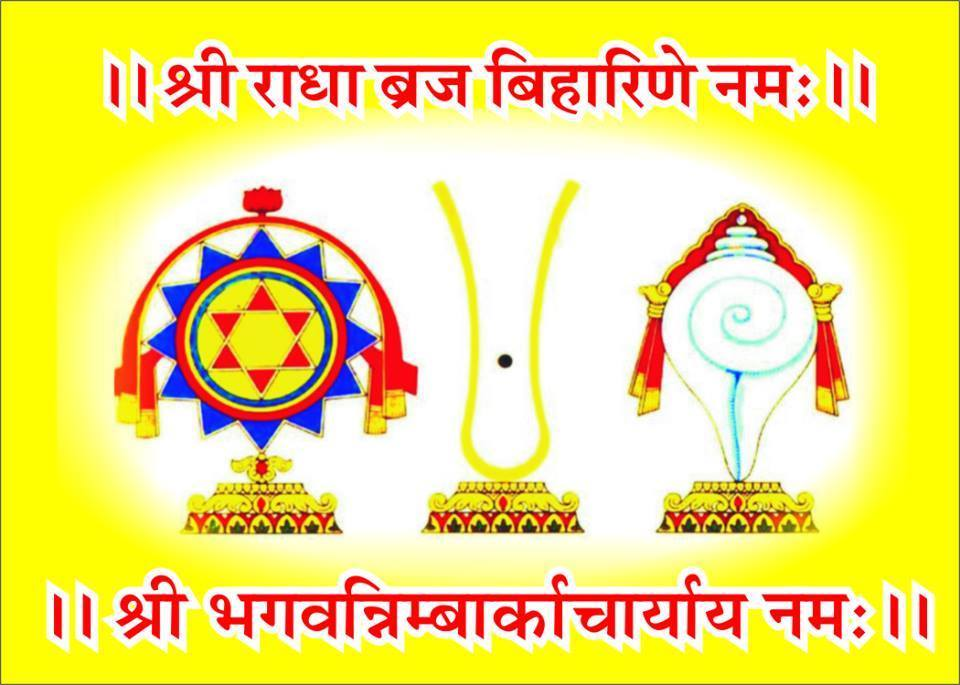
- Shankha-Chakra-Urdhvapundra of the Nimbarka Sampradaya

Founder
- Nimbarka

Regions with significant populations
- India • Nepal

Scriptures
- Sacred Scriptures: Vedas • Puranas • Smritis • Pancharatra Sampradayaic Scriptures: Vedanta Parijata Saurabha, Vedanta Kamadhenu Dashashloki, Siddhānta Jahnavi, Mantrarahasyaṣoḍaśī, Prapannakalpavallī, Kramadīpikā, Tattva-prakāśikā, Viṣṇusahasranāmaṭīkā, Taittriya-prakāśikā, Yugalaśataka, Mahāvāṇī, Parshuram Sagar, Svabhuram Sagar

Languages
- Sacred language: Sanskrit; Other languages: Braj Bhasha • Hindi

The Nimbarka Sampradaya (IAST: Nimbārka Sampradāya, Sanskrit निम्बार्क सम्प्रदाय), also known as the Kumāra Sampradāya, Hamsa Sampradāya, and Sanakādi Sampradāya (सनकादि सम्प्रदाय), is the oldest Vaiṣṇava sect. It was founded by Nimbarka, a Telugu Brahmin yogi and philosopher. It propounds the Vaishnava Bhedabheda theology of Dvaitadvaita (dvaita-advaita) or dualistic non-dualism. Dvaitadvaita states that humans are both different and non-different from Isvara, God or Supreme Being. Specifically, this Sampradaya is a part of Krishnaism—Krishna-centric traditions.

== Guru Parampara ==
Śrī Haṃsa Bhagavān, the originator of the Śrī Nimbārka Sampradāya

Nimbarka Sampradaya is also known as Kumāra Sampradāya, Hamsa Sampradāya, and Sanakādi Sampradāya. According to tradition, the Nimbarka Sampradaya Dvaita-advaita philosophy was revealed by Śrī Hansa Bhagavān to Sri Sanakadi Bhagawan, one of the Four Kumaras; who passed it to Sri Narada Muni; and then on to Nimbarka. The Four Kumaras: Sanaka, Sanandana, Sanātana, and Sanat Kumāra, are traditionally regarded as the four mind-born sons of Lord Brahmā. They were created by Brahmā in order to advance creation, but chose to undertake lifelong vows of celibacy (brahmacarya), becoming renowned yogis, who requested from Brahma the boon of remaining perpetually five years old. Śrī Sanat Kumāra Samhitā, a treatise on the worship of Śrī Rādhā Kṛṣṇa, is attributed to the brothers, just like the Śrī Sanat Kumāra Tantra, which is part of the Pancarātra literature.

In the creation of this universe as narrated by the Paurāṇika literature, Śrī Nārada Muni is the younger brother of the Four Kumāras, who took initiation from his older brothers. Their discussions as guru and disciple are recorded in the Upaniṣads with a famous conversation in the Chāndogya Upaniṣad, and in the Śrī Nārada Purāṇa and the Pañcarātra literature.

Nārada Muni is recorded as main teacher in all four of the Vaiṣṇava Sampradāyas. According to tradition, he initiated Śrī Nimbārkācārya into the sacred 18-syllabled Śrī gopala mamtra (should be given by a guru), and introduced him to the philosophy of the Yugala upāsana, the devotional worship of the divine couple Śrī Rādhā Kṛṣṇa. According to tradition, this was the first time that Śrī Rādhā Kṛṣṇa were worshipped together by anyone on earth other than the Gopis of Vṛndāvana. Śrī Nārada Muni then taught Nimbarka the essence of devotional service in the Śrī Nārada Bhakti Sūtras. Śrī Nimbārkācārya already knew the Vedas, Upaniṣads and the rest of the scriptures, but perfection was found in the teachings of Śrī Nārada Muni.

== Nimbarka ==
=== Dating ===
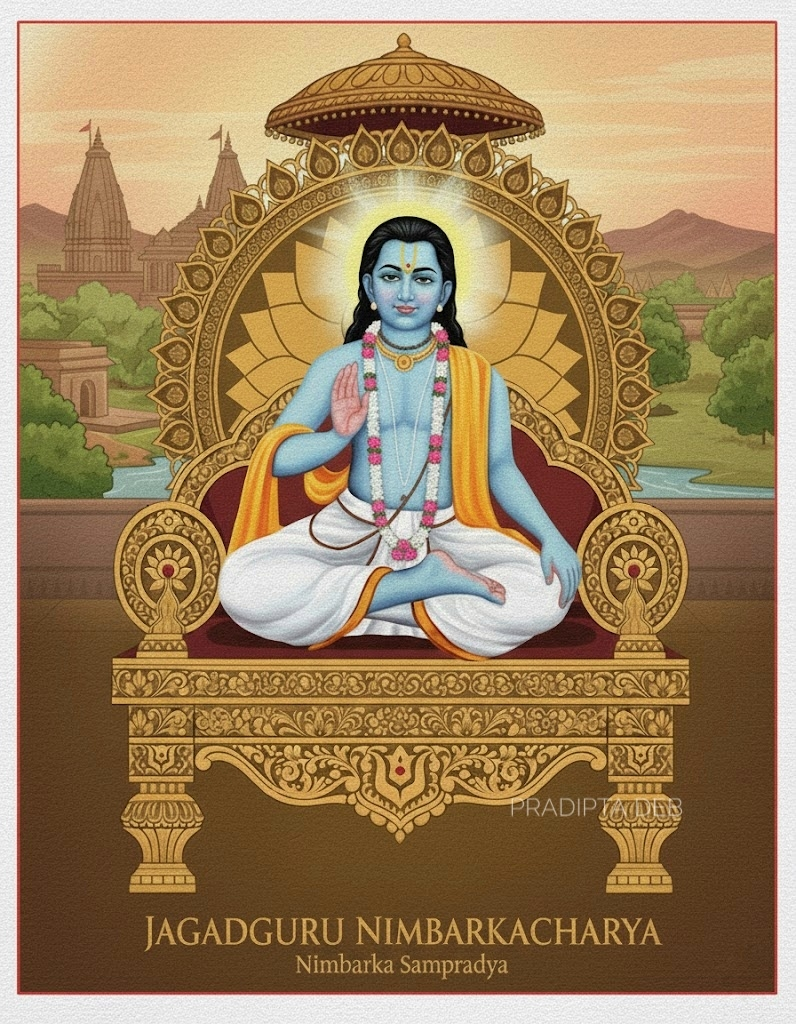
the originator of the Nimbarkacharya

Nimbarka is conventionally dated at the 7th or 11th century, but this dating has been questioned, suggesting that Nimbarka lived somewhat earlier than Shankara, in the 6th or 7th century CE. According to Roma Bose, Nimbarka lived in the 13th century, on the presupposition that Śrī Nimbārkāchārya was the author of the work Madhvamukhamardana. (Note: Bose: "There is a manuscript called " Madhva -mukha-mardana", a criticism of Madhva's religion, attributed to Nimbarka. This places Nimbarka after Madhva, provided the work is really by Nimbarka. The fact that the manuscript is not lent to anybody by the followers of Madhva, perhaps prevented us as well from having it, no reply even being given to our enquiries. It seems Nimbarka undertook the work because it was Madhva's immediate influence upon the people which he had to fight against for making his own campaign successful. Thus, from internal evidences from well-known works by Nimbarka, we can definitely assert that Nimbarka oould not have flourished before Samkara, whereas we are led to think, on the evidence of the manuscript mentioned above, that he did not flourish also before Madhva; i.e. not before the 13th century A.D.) Meanwhile, Vijay Ramnarace concluded that the work Madhvamukhamardana has been wrongly attributed to Nimbarkacharya. This view is also supported by traditional scholars, who hold a similar perspective. Bhandarkar has placed him after Ramanuja, suggesting 1162 AD as the date of his demise.S.N. Dasgupta, on the other hand, dates Nimbārka to the mid-14th century. Dasgupta bases this dating on the absence of Nimbārka's mention in the Sarvadarśanasaṅgraha, a doxography by 14th-century author Mādhava Vidyāraṇya. However, none of the Bhedābhedins—whether Bhartṛprapañca, Nimbārka, Bhāskara, or Yādavaprakāśa—are referenced in the Sarvadarśanasaṅgraha. while S. A. A. Rizvi assigns a date of c. 1130–1200 AD.

According to Satyanand, Bose's dating of the 13th century is an erroneous attribution. Malkovsky, following Satyanand, notes that in Bhandarkar's own work it is clearly stated that his dating of Nimbarka was an approximation based on an extremely flimsy calculation; yet most scholars chose to honour his suggested date, even until modern times. According to Malkovsky, Satyanand has convincingly demonstrated that Nimbarka and his immediate disciple Srinivasacharya flourished well before Ramanuja (1017–1137 CE), arguing that Srinivasacharya was a contemporary, or just after Sankaracarya (early 8th century). According to Ramnarace, summarising the available research, Nimbarka must be dated in the 7th century CE.

=== Traditional accounts ===
According to the Bhavishya Purana, and his eponymous tradition, the Nimbārka Sampradāya, Śrī Nimbārkāchārya appeared in the year 3096 BCE, when the grandson of Arjuna was on the throne. According to tradition, Nimbārka was born in Vaidūryapattanam, the present-day Mungi Village, Paithan in East Maharashtra. His parents were Aruṇa Ṛṣi and Jayantī Devī. Together, they migrated to Mathurā and settled at what is now known as Nimbagrāma (Neemgaon), situated between Barsānā and Govardhan.

== Philosophy ==
=== Dvaitādvaita ===
The Nimbarka Sampradaya follows the doctrine of Svābhāvika Bhedabheda also known as dvaitādvaita. The doctrine of Svābhāvika Bhedābheda is primarily elaborated in the works of Nimbārka and Srinivasacharya, particularly Nimbarka's Vedānta pārijāta saurabha and Vedānta Kaustubha, commentaries on the Brahma Sūtras.

Svābhāvika Bhedābheda discern three foundational elements of reality:

- Brahman, which is the metaphysical ultimate reality; the controller.
- Chit, representing the Jivātman, which is the sentient, individual soul; the enjoyer.
- Achit, which is the non-sentient universe; the object to be enjoyed.

Svābhāvika Bhedābheda holds that the individual soul (jīva) and the non-sentient universe (jagat) are both distinct from and identical to Brahman, the ultimate reality, depending on the perspective. Brahman alone is svatantra tattva (independent reality), while the activities and existence of the other two realities depend on Brahman are regarded as paratantra tattva (dependent reality).

In this approach the relation between Atman and Brahman is "svābhāvika or natural, not brought about by any external agency, and therefore it cannot be dispensed with. An adventitious relation can be finished away by removing the cause or agency which has brought it, but what is inherent or more appropriately natural cannot be taken away."

Brahman pervades the entire universe and is immanent in all beings, yet they retain their individuality. The non-sentient universe is not considered an illusion (māyā), but a real manifestation of Brahman's power. The philosophy draws on metaphors like the sun and its rays, fire and its sparks, to demonstrate the natural, inherent connection between Brahman and its manifestations.

=== Brahman ===
They regard Brahman as the universal soul, both transcendent and immanent, referred to by various names such as Śrī Kṛṣṇa, Viṣnu, Vāsudeva, Purushottama, Nārāyaņa, Paramatman, Bhagawan and so on. Similarly, Nimbārkācārya, in his Vedanta Kamadhenu Daśaślokī, refers to Śrī Kṛṣṇa alongside his consort Rādhā.

Brahman is the supreme being, the source of all auspicious qualities, and possesses unfathomable attributes. It is omnipresent, omniscient, the lord of all, and greater than all. None can be equal to or superior to Brahman. He is the creator, cause of creation, maintenance and destruction of the universe.

In Dvaitādvaita, Brahman is saguṇa (with qualities). Therefore, they interprets scriptural passages that describe Brahman as nirguṇa (without qualities) differently as they argues that nirguṇa, when applied to Brahman, signifies the absence of inauspicious qualities, rather than the complete negation of all attributes. Similarly, terms like nirākāra (formless) are understood to denote the absence of an undesirable or inauspicious form. It upheld the view that Śrī Kṛṣṇa possesses all auspicious attributes and that relative qualities such as virtue and vice, or auspiciousness and inauspiciousness, do not affect him.

Sri Nimbarkacharya, on the worship of the divine couple, in Dasha Shloki (verse 5):

aṅge tu vāme vṛṣabhānujāṁ mudā virājamānām
anurūpasaubhagām ।
sakhīsahasraiḥ parisevitāṁ sadā smarema devīṁ sakaleṣṭakāmadām

Translation:

I reflect on the daughter of Vrsabhānu (Radhikā), who shines with a corresponding beauty on the left side (of Krsna), is attended on by thousands of female friends, and who always confers objects.

=== Jivātman (chit) ===
Jivatman is different from physical body, sense organs, mind, prāṇa and Buddhi, all of these are dependent on Individual soul and serve as instrument in such actions as seeing, hearing and so on. Individual soul (Jivātman) is eternal, being of the nature of Knowledge, and knower (possesses the attribute of knowledge).The attribute of knowledge extends beyond the soul, i.e. its occupying a larger space. As in the case of smell, just like smell occupying a larger space than the flower which occupies a smaller space.

== Practices ==
The basic practice consists of the worship of Sri Radha Madhav, with Sri Radha being personified as the inseparable part of Sri Krishna. Nimbarka Sampradaya became the first Krishnaite tradition in late medieval time. Nimbarka refers to five methods to salvation, namely karma (ritual action); vidya (knowledge); upasana or dhyana (meditation); prapatti (surrender to the Lord/devotion); Gurupasatti (devotion and self-surrender to God as Shri Radha Krsna).

=== Karma (ritual action) ===
Performed conscientiously in a proper spirit, with one's varna and asrama (phase of life) thereby giving rise to knowledge which is a means to salvation).

=== Vidya (knowledge) ===
Not as a subordinate factor of karma but also not as an independent means for everyone; only for those inclined to spending vast lengths of time in scriptural study and reflection on deeper meanings.

=== Upasana or dhyana (meditation) ===
It is of three types. First is meditation on the Lord as one's self, i.e. meditation on the Lord as the Inner Controller of the sentient. Second is meditation on the Lord as the Inner Controller of the non-sentient. Final one is meditation on Lord Himself, as different from the sentient and non-sentient. This is again not an independent means to Salvation for all, as only those qualified to perform the upasana (with Yajnopavitam) can perform this Sadhana.

=== Śaraṇāgati ===
Śaraṇāgati is the complete entrusting of one's own self to the infinitely merciful Lord through the means recommended by the good, when one is convinced of one's incapacity for resorting to other sādhanas like knowledge and the rest. In this tradition there are six constituent elements of Śaraṇāgati (total surrender) in Vedāntaratnamañjūṣā:

- The resolve to treat everyone with good will and friendliness, being convinced of the great truth that everyone and everything, down to as tuft of grass, deserves respect.
- Discarding what is contrary to the above solemn determination, i.e. refraining from all violence, malice, back- biting, falsehood, etc.
- Strong faith in the protection of the Lord.
- Praying to the Lord for protection, being aware of the fact that the Lord, though all-merciful, does not release anyone who does not pray to Him but is, on the contrary, adverse to Him
- Discarding all false pride and sense of egoity, i.e. assuming an attitude of utter humility
- Complete entrusting of one's own self and whatever belongs to one's self to the Lord, being convinced that such a complete resignation of the 'I' and the 'mine' to the Lord alone induce the mercy and grace of the Lord.

== Literature ==
The literature of the Nimbarka Sampradaya reflects its theological, philosophical, and devotional aspects.

=== Commentaries on Brahmasūtras ===
The Brahmasūtras of Bādarāyaṇa have been extensively interpreted and commented upon by several distinguished scholars. Among the six primary commentaries are:

- Vedānta Pārijāta Saurabha by Śrī Nimbārkāchārya.
- Vedānta Kaustubha by Śrī Śrīnivāsāchārya.
- Siddhānta Jahnavi by Śrī Devāchārya.
- Siddhānta Setukā by Śrī Sundara Bhaṭṭāchārya.
- Vedānta Kaustubha Prabhā by Śrī Keśava Kāśmīrī Bhaṭṭāchārya.
- Vedānta Kaustubha Prabhā Bhāvadipikā by Śrī Pandita Amolakrama Śāstrī.

=== Vedāntakāmadhenu Daśaślokī ===
A small work of Nimbārkāchārya containing ten stanzas The Daśaślokī have been extensively commented upon by several scholars. Among them, the three primary commentaries are:

- Vedāntaratnamañjūṣā of Śrī Puruṣottamāchārya
- Vedānta Siddhāntaratnāñjali of Śrī Harivyāsa Devāchārya
- Vedāntalaghumañjūṣā of Śrī Giridhara dāsa

== Nimbarka Sampradaya Devachāryas ==
=== Sri Bhatta ===
As themes of Radha and Krishna gained popularity, Keshava Kashmiri's disciple Sribhatta in the 15th century, amplified Nimbarka's insights and brought Radha Krishna once more into the theological forefront through the medium of brajbhasha. A range of poets and theologians who flourished in the milieu of Vrindavana, Vallabha, Surdas, rest of Vallabha's disciples, Svami Haridas, Chaitanya Mahaprabhu and the Six Goswamis of Vrindavana were influenced in some manner by Sribhatta. The theological insights by this particular teacher were developed by his disciple Harivyasa, whose works reveal not only the theology of Radha Krisna and the sakhis the nitya nikunja lilas of goloka vrindavana, but also embody a fairly developed vedantic theory propagating the unique branch of Bhedabheda philosophy, ultimately the legacy of Nimbarka's original re-envisaging role of Radha.

=== Śrī Harivyāsa Devacārya (c. 1443–1543 CE) ===
Harivyasa devacharya (c. 15th Century, was an Indian philosopher, theologian and poet. He was born in a Gaud brahmin family. He was the 35th āchārya of the Nimbārka Sampradāya. He lived in Vrindavana. He was a disciple of Śrī Śrībhaṭṭa Devāchārya ji and his nom-de-plume was Hari Priyā. He also sent his twelve main disciples on missionary work throughout the India each of which founded their own sub-lineage, a few exists today. The most famous are Svāmī Paraśurāma Devācārya (c. 1525–1610 CE) and Svāmī Svabhūrāma Devācārya (fl. 16th century).

=== Svāmī Svabhūrāma Devācārya (fl. 16th century CE) ===
Svāmī Svabhūrāma Devācārya (fl. 16th century CE) was born in Budhiya Village, outside Jagadhri and Yamunanagar near Kurukshetra in modern Haryana, India. He established over 52 temples in Punjab, Haryana and Vraja during his lifetime; his current followers are found mostly in Vṛndāvana, Haryana, Punjab, Bengal, Rajasthan, Orissa, Assam, Sikkim, Bihar, other regions in Uttar Pradesh and Maharashtra, also in significant numbers in Nepal.

In his sub-lineage, there are many branches. Notable saints of this sub-branch include:

- Saint Swami Chatur Chintamani Nagaji Maharaj, who started the Vraja Parikrama. This tradition has been continuously maintained over 528 years by the Acharyas of the Svabhurāma-Dwara (sub-lineage).
- Swami Brindaban Bihari Das Mahanta Maharaj at Kathia Baba ka Ashram, Shivala, Varanasi, Uttar Pradesh and Sukhchar, 24-Parganas (North), West Bengal, who has undertaken projects for orphans and aged persons, building schools and elderly care homes. He travels relentlessly to spread Nimbarka Philosophy through world religion conferences held in US, UK, Sweden, Africa, Bangladesh and other different countries across the globe.
- The Sukhchar Kathiababar Ashram was originally established by Swami Dhananjaya Das Kathiababa and is presently headed by Swami Brindabanbiharidas Mahanta Maharaj.

=== Svāmī Haripriyā Śaraṇa Devācārya ===
The famous teacher and leader Svāmī Haripriyā Śaraṇa Devācārya, founded the temple and monastery at Bihari Ji Ka Bageecha, Vṛndāvana, sponsored by his disciple, the philanthropic Shri Hargulal Beriwala and the Beriwala Trust in the 19th century.

=== Svāmī Lalitā Śaraṇa Devācārya ===
The predecessor of the current successor was Svāmī Lalitā Śaraṇa Devācārya, who died in July 2005 at the age of 103. One of his other disciples is the world-renowned Svāmī Gopāla Śaraṇa Devācārya, who has founded the Monastery and temple known as the Shri Golok Dham Ashram in New Delhi and Vṛndāvana. He has also helped ordinary Hindus who are not Vaiṣṇava to establish temples overseas. Of note are the Glasgow Hindu Mandir, Scotland, UK: the Lakshmi Narayan Hindu Mandir, Bradford, UK; and the Valley Hindu Temple, Northridge, California. He has also facilitated major festivals at the Hindu Sabha Mandir in Brampton, Canada.

=== Svāmī Rādhā Śarveshavara Śaraṇa Devācārya ===
The 48th leader of the Nimbārka Sampradāya is H.D.H. Jagadguru Nimbārkācārya Svāmī Śrī Rādhā Śarveshavara Śaraṇa Devācārya, known in reverence as Śrī Śrījī Māhārāja by his followers. His followers are mainly in Rajasthan and Vṛndāvana, Mathura. He established the Mandir at the birth site of Śrī Nimbārkācārya in Mungi Village, Paithan, Maharashtra in 2005. In addition, he oversees the maintenance of thousands of temples, hundreds of monasteries, schools, hospitals, orphanages, cow-shelters, environmental projects, memorial shrines, etc., and arranges various scholarly conventions, religious conferences, medical camps and outreach, etc.

=== Śwamī Rashbihāridās Kāthiābabajī Māhārāja (present) ===
The 57th and current leader of the entire Nimbarka Sampradaya community is H.D.H. Swami Rashbihāridās Kāthiābabajī, the chief disciple or spokesperson of the Brajvidehi Akhil Bharatiya Chatu Sampradaya śhri Mahant Śwamī Dhananjayadas Kathiababaji Maharajji, his followers respectfully known as Kathiababa's disciples. He is based at Kathiababa Ka Sthan Ashram in Vrindavan Dham, the land of Radha Krishna in the Indian state of Uttar Pradesh. He is the current leader or spokesperson of the community, which worships the Yuga Vigraha Deity known as Shri Radha Vrindavanbihari. His followers are mainly from Uttar Pradesh, Madhya Pradesh, Maharashtra, Gujarat, Vrindavan, Mathura, West Bengal, Assam, Tripura, and various countries of the world including America, Canada, UK, France, Australia and Bangladesh.

== See also ==
- Svayam Bhagavan
- Vrindavan
- Srinivasacharya

== Bibliography ==
- Beck, Guy L. (2005), "Krishna as Loving Husband of God", in Beck, Guy (ed.), Alternative Krishnas: Regional and Vernacular Variations on a Hindu Deity, SUNY Press, doi:10.1353/book4933, ISBN 978-0-7914-6415-1, S2CID 130088637, archived from the original on 17 July 2023
- Bose, Roma (1940), Vedanta Parijata Saurabha of Nimbarka and Vedanta Kaustubha of Srinivasa (Commentaries on the Brahma-Sutras) – Doctrines of Nimbarka and his followers, vol.3, Asiatic Society of Bengal
- Hardy, Friedhelm E. (1987). "Kṛṣṇaism". In Mircea Eliade (ed.). The Encyclopedia of Religion. Vol. 8. New York: MacMillan. pp. 387–392. ISBN 978-0-02897-135-3.
- Malkovsky, B. (2001), The Role of Divine Grace in the Soteriology of Śaṁkarācārya, BRILL
- Agrawal, Madan Mohan (2013). Encyclopedia of Indian philosophies, Bhedābheda and Dvaitādvaita systems. Encyclopedia of Indian philosophies / general ed.: Karl H. Potter. Delhi: Motilal Banarsidass. ISBN 978-81-208-3637-2.
- Bhandarkar, R. G. (2014). Vaisnavism, Saivism and Minor Religious Systems (Routledge Revivals). Routledge. ISBN 978-1-317-58933-4.
- Ramnarace, Vijay (2014). Rādhā-Kṛṣṇa's Vedāntic Debut: Chronology & Rationalisation in the Nimbārka Sampradāya (PDF) (PhD thesis). University of Edinburgh. Archived (PDF) from the original on 9 October 2022.
- Sri Sarvesvara (1972), Sri Nimbarkacarya Aur Unka Sampraday, Akhila Bharatiya Nimbarkacarya Pitha, Salemabad, Rajasthan, India
- Dasgupta, Surendranath (1988). A history of Indian philosophy. Delhi: Motilal Banarsidass. ISBN 978-81-208-0408-1.
- Prakash, Dr Ravi (2022). Religious Debates in Indian Philosophy. K.K. Publications.
- Hastings, James (1909). Encyclopaedia of Religion and Ethics, Vol. 2: Arthur-Bunyan. FB&C Limited. ISBN 978-0-332-41345-7.
- Catherine, Clémentin-Ojha (1990). "La renaissance du Nimbarka Sampradaya au XVIe siècle. Contribution à l'étude d'une secte Krsnaïte". Journal Asiatique (in French). 278. doi:10.2143/JA.278.3.2011219.
- Kaviraj, Gopinath (1965). काशी की सारस्वत साधना (in Hindi). Bihāra-Rāshṭrabhāshā-Parishad.
- Gupta, Tripta (2000). Vedānta-Kaustubha, a study (in English and Sanskrit). Delhi: Sanjay Prakashan. ISBN 978-81-7453-043-1.
- Radhakrishnan, Sarvepalli (2011). The Brahma Sutra: The Philosophy Of Spiritual Life. Literary Licensing, LLC. ISBN 978-1-258-00753-9.
- Upadhyay, Baladeva (1978). Vaishnava Sampradayon ka Siddhanta aur Sahitya. Varanasi: Chowkhamba Amarbharati Prakashan.
- Ramkrishnadev Garga, Nabha das ji, Priya Das ji (2004). Bhaktamāla of Nābhādāsa, with Bhaktirasabodhinī commentary of Priyādāsa, Hindi translation and gloss by Ramkrishnadev Garga (in Sanskrit and Hindi). Vṛndāvana.
- Klostermaier, Klaus K. (2014). A Concise Encyclopedia of Hinduism. Oneworld Publications. ISBN 978-1-78074-672-2.
- Bose, Roma (2004). Vedānta-pārijāta-saurabha of Nimbārka and Vedānta-kaustubha of Śrīnivāsa: commentaries on the Brahma-sutras; English translation. New Delhi: Munshiram Manoharlal Publishers. ISBN 978-81-215-1121-6.
