= Keshav Kashmiri =

15th century Indian Vedantic Philosopher

- Preceded by: Gāṅgala Bhaṭṭāchārya
- Succeeded by: Śrībhaṭṭa Devāchārya

Personal life
- Born: c. 1410 CE India
- Died: c. 1490 CE
- Era: c. 15 Century
- Region: South Asia
- Notable work(s): Vedānta Kaustubha Prabhā, Kramadīpīkā

Religious life
- Religion: Hinduism
- Philosophy: Svābhāvika Bhedābheda
- Sect: Nimbarka Sampradaya

Keshav Kashmiri (c. 15th century) also known as Keshavacharya and Keshava Kashmriri Bhattacharya (Sanskrit: केशव काश्मीरी, केशवाचार्य, केशव काश्मीरी भट्टाचार्य, romanized: Keśava Kāśmīrī, Keśavācārya, Keśava Kāśmīrī Bhaṭṭācārya) was an Indian philosopher, theologian and poet. He was a Gauda Brāhmana of North, born in the province of Maharashtra, in the village of Vaidūrya-pattanam, also known as Pratiṣṭhāna. He was a disciple of Mukunda and Gāṅgala Bhaṭṭāchārya. He became the 33rd ācārya of the Nimbārka Sampradāya. According to tradition, he thrice conquered all learned men of his time, which earned him the epithet 'Jagadvijayī.

== Life ==
Keśava Kāśmīrī, originally known as Keśavācārya, earned the epithets "Bhaṭṭa" and "Kāśmīrī Bhaṭṭācārya" in recognition of his contributions to religious propagation, his triumphs in philosophical debates, his efforts in countering heretical sects, and his time spent in Kashmir as a pilgrim. However, he would personally refer to himself simply as "Keśava" with brevity. This preference is reflected in the concluding verse of his work Kramadīpikā, a text composed in a cyclical style, where he identifies himself:"Keśavena kṛtā Kramadīpikā" (This Kramadīpikā is composed by Keśava).

According to Agrawal (2000), Keśava Kāśmīrī defeated Vidyādharācārya of the Śākta school of thought in Kaśmīra, and gave him the name Vrajeśācārya, the Yavanas of Mathurā, and the scholars of Navadvīpa. He later settled himself in Kaśmīra.

=== Mathura Miracle ===
Keśava Kāśmīri is linked with many extraordinary occurrences, The most renowned of these performing a miracle in Mathurā to free Hindus from these specific prohibitions and other conversional tactics of muslim rulers. An event famously recounted in the Nābhā dāsa Bhaktamāla chappaya 75.

Nābhā dāsa wrote that "Sri Keshava Bhatt Ji was the crown jewel of all people. His fame spread throughout the world. Due to his long residence in Kashmir, the epithet "Kashmiri" became associated with his name. He was a vanquisher of oppressors and sinners, and an ornament of the human race. With the axe of devotion to Hari, he uprooted the trees of opposing religions and eradicated them completely. In Mathura, he debated with the Yavanas (foreign rulers) and defeated those heretics. It is well known how the Qazis, who refused to yield to anyone, came to fear his spiritual power after witnessing it. This event is no secret; the saintly community bears witness to it."

== Works ==
Keśava Kāśmīrī's works are:

- Vedānta Kaustubha Prabhā: A commentary on Brahmasutrā.
- Kramadīpikā: A Pāñcarātrika work
- Tattva-prakāśikā: A commentary on the Bhagavad-gitā.
- Tattva-prakāśikā-veda-stuti-tīkā: A commentary on the tenth skanda of Bhagavata-purāna.
- Viṣṇusahasranāmaṭīkā: A commentary on Vishnu Sahastranama.

=== Upanishad commentaries ===
- Taittriya-prakāśikā: A commentary on the Taittriya Upanisad.
- keno upanisad bhasya: A commentary on Kena Upanishad.

== Kramadīpikā ==
Kramadīpikā is a work of eight chapters dealing mainly with the ritualistic parts of the Nimbārka school of religion. This work deals very largely with various kinds of Mantras and meditations on them.

=== Influence ===
The Kramadīpikā was influential in the rituals of the Jagannātha temple in Purī, and is quoted in the Haribhaktivilāsa of the Gauḍīya Gosvāmins. It is also an authority on the Krsna worship quoted in the Gopālarcanavidhi of Purusottamadeva (the first and the most standard work on the worship of Jagannatha-Krsna, 15th c.) explicitly refers to the bijamantra of Krsna-Jagannātha as being a "Pradyumna-Mantra" (a Mantra of Pradyumna or Kāma) and designates it as jaganmohana-bewitching the world. “mantrah pradyumno jaganmohano'yam” (kramadīpikā 2.12)

== Bibliography ==
- Agrawal, Madan Mohan (2013). Encyclopedia of Indian philosophies, Bhedābheda and Dvaitādvaita systems. Encyclopedia of Indian philosophies / general ed.: Karl H. Potter. Delhi: Motilal Banarsidass. ISBN 978-81-208-3637-2.
- Upadhyay, Baladeva (1978). Vaishnava Sampradayon ka Siddhanta aur Sahitya. Varanasi: Chowkhamba Amarbharati Prakashan.
- Dasgupta, Surendranath (1988). A history of Indian philosophy. Delhi: Motilal Banarsidass. ISBN 978-81-208-0408-1.
- Bose, Roma (2004). Vedānta-pārijāta-saurabha of Nimbārka and Vedānta-kaustubha of Śrīnivāsa: commentaries on the Brahma-sutras; English translation. New Delhi: Munshiram Manoharlal Publishers. ISBN 978-81-215-1121-6.
- Ramkrishnadev Garga, Nabha das ji, Priya Das ji (2004). Bhaktamāla of Nābhādāsa, with Bhaktirasabodhinī commentary of Priyādāsa, Hindi translation and gloss by Ramkrishnadev Garga (in Sanskrit and Hindi). Vṛndāvana.
- Ramnarace, Vijay (2014). Rādhā-Kṛṣṇa's Vedāntic Debut: Chronology& Rationalisation in the Nimbārka Sampradāya (PDF) (PhD thesis). University of Edinburgh.
- Eschmann, Anncharlott (2014). Kulke, Hermann; Tripathi, Gaya Charan (eds.). The cult of Jagannatha and the regional tradition of Orissa. Studies in Orissan society, culture and history. New Delhi: Manohar. ISBN 978-81-7304-964-4.
- Ramnarace, Vijay (2016). "Brahman Between the Lines: Bhedābheda and Privileged Theology in the Early Nimbārka Sampradāya". The Journal of Hindu Studies. 9 (1): 56–83. doi:10.1093/jhs/hiw010. ISSN 1756-4255.
- White, Charles S. J. (2004). A Catalogue of Vaiṣṇava Literature on Microfilms in the Adyar Library, The Bodleian Library & The American University Library. Motilal Banarsidass Publ. ISBN 978-81-208-2067-8.
- Banerji, S. C. (2007). A Companion to Tantra. Abhinav Publications. ISBN 978-81-7017-402-8.
- Okita, Kiyokazu (2024). Okita, Kiyokazu; Lutjeharms, Rembert (eds.). "Okita, Kiyokazu and Rembert Lutjeharms eds. 2024. The Building of Vṛndāvana (Preliminary Material)". The Building of Vṛndāvana: Architecture, Theology, and Practice in an Early Modern Pilgrimage Town. doi:10.1163/9789004686779. ISBN 978-90-04-68677-9.
