= Devotion =

Devotion or Devotions may refer to:

== Religion ==
- Worship, the act of devotion in a religious or ritualistic context
- Anglican devotions, private prayers and practices used by Anglican Christians
- Buddhist devotion, commitment to religious observance
- Catholic devotions, customs, rituals, and practices of worship of God or honour of the saints
- Marian devotions, directed to Mary, mother of God
- Sufism, Islamic devotion, focused on purification, spirituality, ritualism, and asceticism

== Arts and entertainment ==
=== Film and television ===
- Devotion (1921 film), an American silent film
- Devotion (1929 film), an Austrian-German silent drama
- Devotion (1931 film), an American drama
- Devotion (1946 film), an American biographical film
- Devotion (1950 film), an Italian film
- Devotion (1954 film), a Soviet film
- Devotion (2022 film), an American biographical war drama film
- Devotion (TV series), a Singaporean TV series
- Devotion, a Story of Love and Desire, an Italian TV series
- "Devotion" (Charlie Jade), an episode of the TV series

=== Gaming ===
- Devotion (video game), 2019

=== Literature ===
- Devotion (novella), by Botho Strauß, 1977
- Devotion (book), a 2017 non-fiction book by Patti Smith
- Devotions upon Emergent Occasions, 1624 John Donne work commonly referred to as Devotions
- Devotion: An Epic Story of Heroism, Friendship, and Sacrifice, a 2015 biography of Thomas J. Hudner Jr. and Jesse L. Brown
- Devotion, a 2021 novel by Hannah Kent

=== Music ===
==== Groups ====
- The Devotions, an American doo-wop group

==== Albums and EPs ====
- Devotion (Anberlin album), 2013
- Devotion (Baby V.O.X album), 2003
- Devotion (Beach House album), 2008
- Devotion (Jessie Ware album), 2012
- Devotion (John McLaughlin album), 1970
- Devotion (Kap Bambino album), 2012
- Devotion (L.T.D. album), 1979
- Devotion (Margaret Glaspy album), 2020
- Devotion (Masami Okui album), 2001
- Devotion (Mia Martina album), 2011
- Devotion (Newsboys album), 2004
- Devotion (Tirzah album), 2018
- Devotion (EP), by At War With False Noise, 2008
- Devotion, an EP by Shizuka Itō, 2010
- Devotion: The Best of Yanni, 1997

==== Songs ====
- "Devotion" (song), by Earth, Wind & Fire, 1974
- "Devotion", a song by Coleman Hell from the 2016 album Summerland
- "Devotion", a song by Ellie Goulding from the 2015 album Delirium
- "Devotion", a song by Hurts featuring Kylie Minogue from the 2010 album Happiness
- "Devotion", a song by Luscious Jackson from the 1999 album Electric Honey
- "Devotion", a song by Rüfüs Du Sol from the 2021 album Surrender
- "(I Wanna Give You) Devotion", by Nomad, 1990
- "Devotion", a song by Weezer from the Deluxe Edition of the 1996 album Pinkerton

== Places ==
- Devotion, North Carolina, United States, an unincorporated community

== See also ==
- Devotional (disambiguation)
- Devotion + Doubt, a 1997 album by Richard Buckner
- Bhakti, devotion in Hinduism
- Pietas, devotion among the ancient Romans
- Knightly Piety, Christian belief espoused by knights during the Middle Ages
