= Nimbarka =

Hindu philosopher

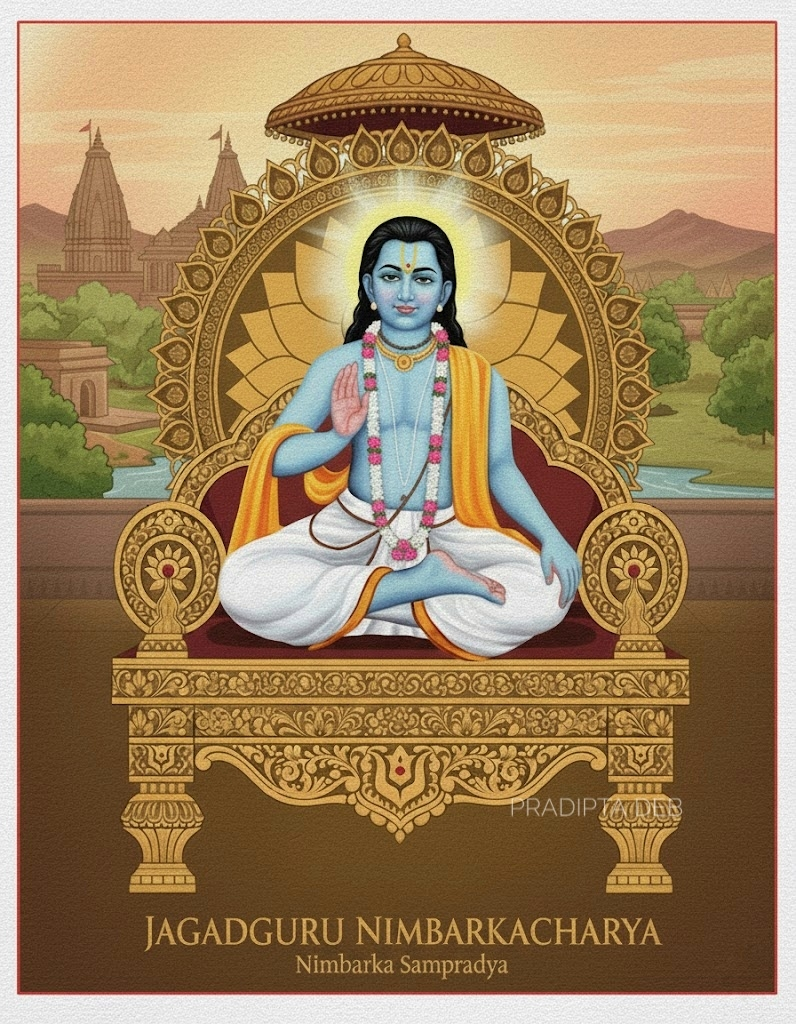
- An icon of Nimbarkacharya at Kathiababa Ashram, Vrindavan

Personal life
- Born: Niyamananda; 7th–8th century CE or 11th–12th century CE Pratiṣṭḥāna, India
- Died: 7th–8th century CE or 11th–12th century CE Vrindavan, India
- Parents: Jagannath and Sarasvati; or; Aruna Rishi and Jayanti devi
- Honors: Jagadguru, Pravakta acharya

Religious life
- Religion: Hinduism
- Order: Vedanta
- Founder of: Nimbarka Sampradaya
- Philosophy: Dvaitadvaita Vedanta

Religious career
- Disciples: Srinivasacharya

Nimbarka, also known as Nimbarkacharya, Nimbaditya or Niyamananda, was a philosopher, theologian and the chief proponent of the theology of Dvaitādvaita (dvaita–advaita) or dualistic–non-dualistic sometimes known as Svābhāvika bhedābheda. He is associated with the theological elevation of Radha Krishna, and is regarded as the founder of the Nimbarka Sampradaya.

The dating of Nimbarka is disputed. Many historians place him in the 12th or 13th century, but this dating has been questioned, suggesting that he lived somewhat earlier than Shankaracharya, in the 6th or 7th century CE. Born in Southern India in a Telugu Brahmin family, he spent most of his life in Mathura, Uttar Pradesh. He is sometimes identified with another philosopher named Bhaskara, but this is considered to be a misconception due to the differences between the spiritual views of the two saints.

== Etymology and epithets ==
The word 'Nimbārka' (निंबार्क) is derived from two Sanskrit words — nimba (निम्ब) and arka (अर्क). It is believed that Nimbarka was given the name 'Niyamananda' at his birth. According to a folk tale, Niyamananda achieve the name Nimbarka because he trapped some rays of sunlight (arka) in the leaves of Neem (nimba). Also according to a traditional accoount, the young Niyamananda was hosting an ascetic gues who would not eat after sunset. As dusk fell, he placed Vishnu's Sudarshana Chakra on a neem (nimba) tree, where it shone like the sun (arka), so that the guest could eat; in Swami Sivananda's telling the guest was Brahma in disguise, who then gave him the name Nimbarka. Other tellings describe the guest as a ''daṇḍī'' (a staff-bearing renunciate) and have the sun god himself wait on the neem tree. He was also referred as Nimbaditya by his followers. Sometimes Bhaskara is also considered his epithet because of the identification of Nimbarka with the philosopher Bhaskara.

== Datings ==
Nimbarka's traditional followers believe that he appeared in 3096 BCE, but this dating is controversial as historians believe that he lived between 7th and 11th century CE. According to Roma Bose, Nimbarka lived in the 13th century, on the presupposition that Nimbarkacharya was the author of the work Madhvamukhamardana. Meanwhile, Vijay Ramnarace concluded that the work Madhvamukhamardana has been wrongly attributed to Nimbarkacharya. This view is also supported by traditional scholars. Bhandarkar places Nimbārka after Rāmānuja, suggesting 1162 CE as the approximate date of his demise, though he acknowledged that this estimation is highly speculative. S.N. Dasgupta, on the other hand, dates Nimbārka to the mid-14th century. Dasgupta bases this dating on the absence of Nimbārka's mention in the Sarvadarśanasaṅgraha, a doxography by 14th-century author Mādhava Vidyāraṇya. However, none of the Bhedābhedins—whether Bhartṛprapañca, Nimbārka, Bhāskara, or Yādavaprakāśa—are referenced in the Sarvadarśanasaṅgraha. While S. A. A. Rizvi assigns a date of c.1130–1200 CE.

According to Satyanand, Bose's dating of the 13th century is an erroneous attribution. Malkovsky, following Satyanand, notes that in Bhandarkar's own work it is clearly stated that his dating of Nimbarka was an approximation based on an extremely flimsy calculation; yet most scholars chose to honour his suggested date, even until modern times. According to Malkovsky, Satyanand has convincingly demonstrated that Nimbarka and his immediate disciple Srinivasacharya flourished well before Ramanuja (1017–1137 CE), arguing that Srinivasacharya was a contemporary, or just after Sankaracarya (early 8th century). According to Ramnarace, summarising the available research, Nimbarka must be dated in the 7th century CE.

== Biography ==
Little is known about Nimbarka's life. He is said to have been born into a Telugu Brahmin family on the 3rd bright half of the month Vaisakha. His parents were Jagannath, a Bhagavata saint, and his wife Sarasvati, who lived in Pratiṣṭḥāna, which is in present-day Paithan, Maharashtra. However, some other versions suggest that the name of his parents were Aruna Rishi and Jayanti Devi, who lived in a place near the river Godavari, which may be in Maharashtra. Nimbarka's followers believe him as the incarnation of Vishnu's weapon, Sudarshana Chakra.

It is believed that Nimbarka was given the name Niyamananda at his birth, but sometimes Bhaskara is considered as his birth name. During Nimbarka's early years, it is described that his family moved to Vrindavan, but there is no historical recorded account.

== Works of Nimbarka ==
=== Vedanta Parijata Saurabha ===
The Vedānta Pārijāta Saurabha composed by Nimbārka is extremely concise and does not refute the views of others. According to the Sanskrit scholar Upadhyay, this form of commentary undoubtedly indicates it's antiquity. The Vedānta Pārijāta Saurabha represents an earlier style of Brahmasūtra commentary in the manner of the authors that preceded Śaṅkara. It supports the bhedābheda school of Vedānta, which advocates the view of a relationship of simultaneous unity and diversity between Brahman, the individual soul (jīva) and the universe (jagat). Nimbarka writes that performing karma is not a means to liberation. He takes knowledge, attained through devotion, as the means to liberation.

Vedānta Pārijāta Saurabha is further commented by Srinivasacharya in his Vedanta kaustubha

=== Vedanta kamadhenu dashashloki ===
The dashashloki is very simple, suited to a devotee who is not concerned with logical theories and arguments, but seeks simple and immediate truth .

The Vedānta kāmadhenu Daśaślokī have been extensively commented upon by several scholars. Among them, the three primary commentaries are:

- Vedāntaratnamañjūṣā of Śrī Puruṣottamāchārya
- Vedānta Siddhāntaratnāñjali of Śrī Harivyāsa Devāchārya
- Vedāntalaghumañjūṣā of Śrī Giridhara dāsa

=== Mantrarahasyaṣoḍaśī and Prapannakalpavallī ===
Mantrarahasyaṣoḍaśī is a work consisting of 18 verses, with the first 16 dedicated to exposition of the revered 18-syllable Gopāla Mantra, a central element of the Nimbārka tradition. Sundara bhaṭṭācharya has authored a commentary on this work titled Mantrārtharahasya.

The Prapannakalpavallī explains the mukunda śaraṇāgati mantra. On this, Sundara bhaṭṭācharya has written an extensive commentary titled Prapannasuratarumañjarī.

== Theology of Radha and Krishna ==
Within the Nimbarka Sampradaya and broader Vaishnava scholarship, Nimbarka is regarded as one of the earliest Vedantic acharyas to formalize the worship of Radha and Krishna as the supreme reality (Parabrahman). His theology centers on the dual worship of Krishna accompanied by Radha. Works attributed to Nimbarka, including the Dashashloki, Radhashtakam, Krishnashtakam, and Pratahsmaranastotram, celebrate Radha as Krishna's eternal consort.

In his Vedanta Kamadhenu Dashashloki (verse 6), it is clearly stated that:

ange tu vaame vrishabhaanujaam mudaa viraajamaanaam anuruupasaubhagaam.
sakhiisahasraih parisevitaam sadaa smarema deviim sakalestakaamadaam

Translation:

The left portion of the body of the Krishna is Shri Radha, seated blissfully, as beautiful as the Lord Himself; who is served by thousands of gopis: we meditate on the Supreme Goddess, the fulfiller of all desires.

Some scholars such as Satyanand and Malkovsky have questioned this attribution because Nimbarka's Brahma Sutra commentary, the Vedantaparijatasaurabha, omits Radha's name and uses conventional Vaishnava epithets like Purushottama and Ramakanta. Madan Mohan Agrawal defends Nimbarka's authorship of the Dashashloki, explaining that the Vedantaparijatasaurabha offered a Dvaitadvaita interpretation of the Upanishads for a broad philosophical audience, while shorter devotional texts were composed specifically for initiated disciples (sadhus). Scholars of Hinduism and Braj Vaishnavism tradition, including Pauwels, Guy L. Beck, and Klostermaier, likewise treat Nimbarka as a figure who established Radha's central theological place alongside Krishna. Ramnarace notes that this division between philosophical commentaries and devotional hymns reflects standard Vedantic pedagogical convention rather than separate authorship. He also draws on the literary research of Charlotte Vaudeville and Barbara Stoler Miller to establish that Radha already appeared in Sanskrit and Prakrit poetry well before the 8th century CE and Nimbakra was one of the first acharya who popularized it.

=== Brahman ===
According to Nimbarka, the ultimate reality or Brahman is Krishna, recognized by various names such as Purushottama, Hari, Vasudeva, and Bhagavan, and accompanied by Radha. As summarized from Nimbarka's Dashashloki (verses 5-6), Brahman is flawless, possesses all auspicious qualities, transcends the influence of karma, and holds attributes such as knowledge, power, and compassion. Brahman is also both the material and efficient cause of creation, likened to a sovereign emperor engaging in playful activities without specific outcomes in mind.

=== Jiva ===
Nimbarka considered the jiva to possess inherent knowledge (jnana), which distinguishes it from non-sentient elements such as the body, sense organs, and mind. This inherent knowledge permeates every state of the jiva, including waking, dreaming, and deep sleep. Nimbarka explains that the jiva is both knowledge and knower, likening their relationship to that of a gem and its radiance, where they are distinct yet inseparable, existing in a relationship of substrate and attribute. Nimbarka writes that there are an infinite number of jivas. He argues that if there were only one jiva, then if one person slept, everyone should sleep, and if one person were happy or sad, everyone would feel the same.

=== Relationship between Brahman and Jiva ===
Nimbarka's philosophy distinctively outlines the differences between jiva and Brahman by emphasizing their intrinsic relationship as cause and effect, part and whole. Brahman is portrayed as the ultimate cause and the whole, whereas jiva, the individual soul that experiences pleasure and pain, is seen as an effect or a transformation of Brahman. This relationship is analogous to clay transforming into pottery or a tree bearing leaves and fruits, showing differences between the source material and its derivatives. Using scriptural references, Nimbarka asserted that jiva, as a part of the omnipotent Brahman, lacks independence and fullness of power.

=== Relation to other Vedanta schools ===
Like Nimbarka, acharyas of other Vedanta schools also accept the concepts of difference and non-difference between Jiva and Brahman as real, but they explain and reconcile these ideas in various ways:

- Nimbarka asserts that the relationship of both difference and non-difference between Jiva and Brahman is natural (svabhavika) and fully compatible, meaning these aspects coexist without conflict.
- Ramanuja and Srikantha explain the relationship using the analogy of the soul and body (sariri-sarira), where non-difference is principal and difference is subordinate.
- Chaitanya Mahaprabhu considers the concepts of difference and non-difference to be inconceivable (acintya), implying that human understanding is limited in fully grasping how both can be true simultaneously.

From a comparative perspective, Martine Chifflot situates Nimbarka's bhedābheda within the broader spectrum of Vedāntic schools by contrasting the dualist-non-dualist position with the strictly non-dualist Advaita of Śaṅkara. Where Advaita dissolves all ontological difference between jīva and Brahman, Nimbarka's svābhāvika bhedābheda preserves their simultaneous distinction and identity as an irreducible natural relation.

== Legacy ==
Nimbarka founded the Nimbarka Sampradaya (also known as the Sanakadi Sampradaya), recognized as one of the four principal Vaishnava traditions of Vedanta. His immediate disciples and successors, beginning with Shrinivasa, who composed the Vedantakaustubha commentary on Nimbarka's Brahmasutra bhashya, systematized and preserved his philosophical teachings.

During the 15th and 16th centuries, teachers of the lineage such as Keshava Kashmiri, Shribhatta, and Harivyasa Deva established the tradition firmly in the Braj region. Through their vernacular poetry, temple networks, and ritual manuals such as Keshava Kashmiri's Kramadipika, Nimbarka's lineage shaped the development of Braj Vaishnavism and influenced other Krishna-bhakti traditions, including the Gaudiya and Radhavallabha schools.
