= Devotion (book) =

2017 book by Patti Smith

- Author: Patti Smith
- Publisher: Yale University Press
- Publication date: September 12, 2017
- Media type: Print
- Pages: 93

Devotion is a 2017 nonfiction book written by Patti Smith. The book is considered "the first in Yale University Press's (Hanson 2017)" series called "Why I Write", which was shared in 2016 at Yale University for a Windham-Campbell lecture. It is composed of three sections.

== Summary ==
The first part, called "How the Mind Works", reveals insights to her writing process, some details about her travels around France and England — including her visit to her French publisher Gallimard, Voltaire's statue in Square Honoré-Champion, and the grave of Simone Weil (who serves as a notable inspiration to Smith's writing and for the female protagonist in Devotion) in Ashford, Kent — along with an intimate recount about her personal life.

The second part, titled "Devotion", focuses on a short story exploring the relationship of Eugenia (called Philadelphia by the man who is interested in her) — a multilingual school girl originally from Estonia, who's a talented figure skater who's separated from her parents at a young age — and Alexander — according to Lindgren (2017) in the Washington Post — a "Svengali-like [mysterious] older figure". At first he supports her passions but eventually his machiavellian pursuits are disclosed when he takes her to a land that's hot, the opposite environment she requires to do her favorite activity and have her abilities as an ice skater flourish. Both become romantically involved which ends once Eugenia kills Alexander as a way of capturing her freedom. Ultimately, the tale deals with themes of self discovery and identity. Media she's crossed paths with serves as one of her muse's for "Devotion" evident by the incorporation of a video she saw about a youthful Russian figure skater and a movie trailer regarding exiled people from Estonia to Siberia.

The third part can be referred to as "A Dream Is Not a Dream", which makes literary allusions — including but not limited to Virginia Woolf, Dylan Thomas, and Vladimir Nabokov — as well as pose some profound questions and further review her reasons for writing. Additionally, she discussed her time spent in Albert Camus home in France, which consists of seeing Camus's original version of The First Man.

== Publication details ==
Smith, Patti. Devotion. New Haven, Connecticut: Yale University Press, 2017.

== Reception ==
Devotion received mixed reviews. Author and critic Matt Hanson wrote in The Arts Fuse that Smith's "craft depicted in Just Kids are only frustratingly glimpsed in Devotion." Author James Carraghan, writing for TERSE. Journal, said, "the brief story that makes up the center of Devotion reads like a fairy tale." On behalf of The Washington Post, Michael Lindgren called the book "equal parts exasperating and inspiring" and highlighted how it "illustrates how a creative mind transforms impressions and thoughts into art".
