= Dvaitadvaita Vedanta =

One of the most popular schools of the Vedanta school of Hindu philosophy

Dvaitadvaita Vedanta, also known as Svabhavika Bhedabheda and as Svabhavika Bhinnabhinna (Sanskrit: द्वैताद्वैत वेदान्त, स्वाभाविक भेदाभेद, स्वाभाविक भिन्नाभिन्न, romanized: Dvaitādvaita Vedānta, Svābhāvika Bhedābheda, Svābhāvika Bhinnābhinna), is the philosophical doctrine of "natural identity-in-difference" or "natural difference cum-non-difference." It was propagated by the medieval Vedānta scholars Nimbarkacharya and Srinivasacharya, as an explication of bhedābheda, difference and non-difference of Atman and Brahman.

== Etymology ==
The word Dvaitadvaita is a composite of two Sanskrit words: dvaita, meaning duality, and advaita, meaning non-duality, together meaning "difference cum non-difference". This philosophy, founded by Nimbarka, is also known as Svabhavika Bhedabheda, meaning "natural difference cum non-difference". The term Svabhavika is derived from the sva (own) bhava (nature), meaning "one's own nature, inherent, natural" or "innate".

== History ==
Bādarāyaṇa, Ṭaṅka Brahmānandin Ātreya, Dramiḍa, Bhartṛprapañca, Nimbārka, Śrīnivāsa and Yādavaprakāśa are considered as early proponents of Dvaitādvaita Vedānta. Except for the surviving works of Bādarāyaṇa, Nimbārka and Śrīnivāsa, the original compositions have been lost. Their philosophical contributions survived primarily through quotations and references in the works of later thinkers such as Śaṅkara, Bhāskara, Sureśvara, Yāmuna and Rāmānuja.

=== Ṭaṅka Brahmānandin Ātreya ===
Ṭaṅka Brahmānandin Ātreya (Sanskrit: टङ्क ब्रह्मानन्दिन् आत्रेय, टङ्काचार्य; also known as Tankacharya; c. 6th century), composed the Vākya commentary on the Chāndogya Upaniṣad and is thus known as the Vākyakāra. Ṭaṅka was an annotator of the Upanisadic scriptures. He explained difficult passages in the texts and presented etymological explanation which he believed to be appropriate. In cases where the scriptural texts are difficult to accept literally, he attempted to clarify the nuances of the context.

Ṭaṅka explicitly rejected the doctrine that God's body is a mere pedagogic fiction; thereby affirming the reality of the world to some extent. He described the relationship between God and the world (including the empirical soul) through analogies reminiscent of Dvaitādvaita thought. He compared this relationship to that between the sea and its foam: the changing phenomena of the world are not meaningless or useless products of a random commotion; they are reabsorbed by the tranquil depths of an infinite Being when the calm returns, leaving the Being undisturbed in its profound nature.

=== Dramiḍa ===
Dramida (Sanskrit: द्रमिड, द्रमिडाचार्य, romanized: Dramiḍa, Dramiḍācharya), also known as Dramidacharya, was a 6th-century Vedāntic philosopher who composed a commentary on Ṭaṅka’s Vākya commentary. According to him, Brahman is a personal deity who bestows liberation upon those who pray for his grace. His views on the individual soul’s position during liberation are closer to those of Nimbārka.

=== Nimbarka ===
Nimbarka formalized the Dvaitādvaita doctrine in his Vedanta Parijata Saurabha commentary on the Brahma Sutras. Nimbarka emphasized that Brahman is both the efficient and material cause of the universe and that souls and matter are eternally dependent on Brahman while remaining real and distinct.

=== Shrinivasa ===
Shrinivasa was a 13th-century philosopher and disciple of Nimbarka and a prominent acharya of the Nimbarka Sampradaya. He composed the Vedānta Kaustubha, a commentary expanding and clarifying Nimbarka's Brahma Sutras bhashya, the Vedānta pārijāta saurabha, providing the doctrinal foundation of the Nimbarka Sampradaya. Shrinivasa emphasized Nimbarka's thoughts that the intrinsic relation between Brahman, cit, and achit, is one of Svābhāvika bhedābheda that is not created by any external cause.

== Philosophy ==
Dvaitadvaita Vedanta (Svābhāvika bhedābheda) is an interpretation and harmonisation of the Upanishads, the Bhagavad Gītā, and the Brahma Sūtras, integrating both dualistic and non-dualistic interpretations of these texts. The doctrine of Svābhāvika Bhedābheda is primarily elaborated in the works of Nimbārka and Srinivasacharya, particularly Nimbarka's Vedānta pārijāta saurabha and Vedānta Kaustubha, commentaries on the Brahma Sūtras.

Svābhāvika Bhedābheda identifies three fundamental realities (tattvas):

- Brahman, which is the metaphysical ultimate reality; the controller.
- Chit, representing the Jivātman, which is the sentient, individual soul; the enjoyer.
- Achit, which is the non-sentient universe; the object to be enjoyed.

Svābhāvika Bhedābheda holds that the individual soul (jīva) and the non-sentient universe (jagat) are both distinct from and identical to Brahman, the ultimate reality, depending on the perspective. Brahman alone is svatantra tattva (independent reality), while the activities and existence of the other two realities depend on Brahman are regarded as paratantra tattva (dependent reality).

According to Gupta, in this approach the relation between Atman and Brahman is "svābhāvika or natural, not brought about by any external agency, and therefore it cannot be dispensed with. An adventitious relation can be finished away by removing the cause or agency which has brought it, but what is inherent or more appropriately natural cannot be taken away."

Brahman pervades the entire universe and is immanent in all beings, yet individual souls and the non-sentient universe retain their individuality. The non-sentient universe is not considered an illusion (māyā), but a real manifestation of Brahman's power.

The philosophy draws on metaphors like the sun and its rays, fire and its sparks, to demonstrate the natural, inherent connection between Brahman and its manifestations. In their teachings, Nimbarka and Shrinivasa emphasize the devotional aspect of the relationship between the soul and Brahman, often framing the divine as Kṛṣṇa and the individual soul in the role of the devotee. Bhakti (devotion) plays a central role in realizing the nature of Brahman and the soul's relationship with it.

== Brahman ==
It regards Brahman as the universal soul, both transcendent and immanent, referred to by various names such as Śrī Kṛṣṇa, Viṣnu, Vāsudeva, Purushottama, Nārāyaņa, Paramatman, Bhagawan and so on. Similarly, Nimbārkācārya, in his Vedanta Kamadhenu Daśaślokī, refers to Śrī Kṛṣṇa alongside his consort Rādhā.

Brahman is the supreme being, the source of all auspicious qualities, and possesses unfathomable attributes. It is omnipresent, omniscient, the lord of all, and greater than all. None can be equal to or superior to Brahman. He is the creator, cause of creation, maintenance and destruction of the universe.

In Svabhavika Bhedābheda, Brahman is saguṇa (with qualities). Therefore, he interprets scriptural passages that describe Brahman as nirguṇa (without qualities) differently as he argues that nirguṇa, when applied to Brahman, signifies the absence of inauspicious qualities, rather than the complete negation of all attributes. Similarly, terms like nirākāra (formless) are understood to denote the absence of an undesirable or inauspicious form. It upheld the view that Śrī Kṛṣṇa possesses all auspicious attributes and that relative qualities such as virtue and vice, or auspiciousness and inauspiciousness, do not affect him.

=== Material cause and efficient cause ===
In the Svabhāvika Bhedābheda view, Brahman is seen as both the efficient and material cause of the universe. Brahman serves as the material cause of the universe by transforming His inherent powers from subtle to gross forms. These powers are known as Parā and Apara. These powers, different from their possessor (Brahman), is also non-different from Brahman, because they have no existence and activity apart from the possessor. The relationship between these powers and Brahman can be understood through the concepts of śakti and śaktimān—power and the powerful. At the moment of creation, these latent powers manifest into tangible forms, giving rise to various effects.

Brahman is also the efficient cause, as He connects individual selves with the outcomes of their actions. This connection is elucidated through the understanding that individual selves often struggle to recall the impressions of past lives due to the continuous cycle of actions and their results. Brahman facilitates their experience of these fruits by providing the necessary instruments and knowledge. By stating that He imparts knowledge, Svābhāvika Bhedābhedin implies that without such understanding, individuals cannot discern between positive and negative outcomes; thus, they would be unable to experience happiness or sorrow in response to events. Consequently, Brahman equips individuals with knowledge to enable them to fully engage with and enjoy the results of their actions.

=== Creation ===
In the scriptures, Brahman is referred to as Āptakāma, meaning "one whose desires are fully realized." This raises the question: what purpose does Brahman, who lacks unfulfilled desires, have in creating the universe?

To address this, the Svābhāvika Bhedābhedin school refers to the concept of lila (divine play), as expounded by Bādarāyaṇa in the Brahma Sūtras, particularly the aphorism "lokavat tu lila kaivalyam", which translates to "creation is merely a sport for Brahman." Here, the term lila denotes an activity performed spontaneously and joyfully, much like a playful act that requires no effort or intent. As described, lila is characterized as an effortless, joyful expression, unlike a deliberate, self-conscious exertion. In line with this idea, Svābhāvika Bhedābhedin holds that the creation of the universe is a lila of Brahman—a natural and unmotivated expression of divine bliss.

This analogy is further illustrated by comparing Brahman to a sovereign king, who, despite having all his desires fulfilled, occasionally engages in playful activities purely out of exuberance and joy. Just as a person overflowing with happiness may dance or sing without any specific purpose, so too does Brahman create the universe as a spontaneous expression of bliss, without any underlying motive or goal.

However, this leads to another question: if creation is a lila, does that imply it is devoid of any significance or guiding principle? In response, it is clarified that while creation is a lila, it is still governed by a sense of order and justice. Brahman creates the universe in such a way that beings may reap the consequences of their actions. Brahman remains impartial, akin to a cloud that pours rain equally everywhere; the variance in the crops is determined by the nature of the soil and seeds, not by the cloud itself.

Another question that arises concerns the origin of the first creation: how was the nature of the first creation determined? The response is that creation is without any beginning and endless, and thus, the notion of a "first" creation is irrelevant in this context.

== Jivātman ==
Jivatman is different from physical body, sense organs, mind, prāṇa and Buddhi, all of these are dependent on Individual soul and serve as instrument in such actions as seeing, hearing and so on. Individual soul (Jivātman) is eternal, being of the nature of Knowledge, and knower (possesses the attribute of knowledge). The attribute of knowledge extends beyond the soul, i.e. its occupying a larger space. As in the case of smell, just like smell occupying a larger space than the flower which occupies a smaller space.

- The idea of a non-sentient soul, is rejected, because then the attribute of knowledge by itself, being the effector of all practical transactions, will come to attain primacy; and hence the non-sentient substratum of the attribute (viz. the soul), being non-liable to salvation or bondage, virtue or vice, will come to be non-primary or useless and finally, because of its opposition to Scripture.
- The idea of mere consciousness, too, is rejected, because if consciousness be all-pervading, then there will be no perception of the pleasure and the like pertaining to the entire body; but if it be atomic in size, then there will be no experience of the pleasure and the like pertaining to hands, feet and so on (simuntaneously).

=== Size of Jivātman ===
On the doubt, whether this soul is of:

- a middle size (i.e. change size according to body), or
- an all-pervading size, or
- an atomic size.

They say that individual soul is capable "of departing, going and returning". These three are not possible if it be all-pervading. Moreover, if it be all-pervading, then experiences of pleasure and the like will result everywhere. If, on the other hand, it be of a middle size, then it must be non-eternal. Hence, the atomicity of the soul is the only remaining alternative. Just as one drop of yellow sandal-paste, occupying one spot of the body, produces, through its own quality, a pleasurable sensation extending over the entire body, so the soul too, occupying one spot of the body, experiences, through its own quality, the pleasure and the like extending over the entire body.

=== Relationship with Brahman ===
The individual soul is neither absolutely different from the Brahman, nor absolutely non different from him rather, it is regarded as a part of Brahman. The term 'part' here signifies a 'power,' in line with the scriptural assertion: "This individual soul, a power of the Highest, is limited in its capabilities and not independent." The individual soul, though distinct from the Brahman, who is the repository of infinite attributes such as omniscience and omnipotence, is inherently linked to the Brahman due to its dependence on Him for its existence, activity, and ultimate liberation. This relationship is established despite the distinction arising from the limited nature of the individual in contrast to the unlimited nature of the Supreme. Why is this so? Because scriptural statements assert both differences and non-differences. The scriptures declare: "diverse appellations", "declaration of differences", "and also otherwise", and "declaration of non- differences". Due to the equal authority of scriptural statements affirming both differences and non- differences, it is understood that the relationship between the jiva and the Supreme Being is characterized by an natural differences and non-differences (Svābhāvika bhedābheda).

It is also pointed out that as there is non-difference between jiva and Brahman, then it would be liable to undergo the sorrows and happiness of individual selves entangled in various births and thus would incur the fault of doing what is not beneficial to It. To this they reply that such faults are not possible in the case of Brahman as It is not only non-different, but also different from jiva in nature and is not touched by the faults of individual self. Furthermore, Brahman, does not partake in the virtues and vices associated with the individual soul. This is analogous to the relationship between "light," such as that of the sun, and its rays. Just as the sun remain unaffected by the interaction of its rays with pure or impure objects, so too does the Supreme Soul remain untouched by the virtues and vices associated with the individual soul.

== Relation to other schools of Vedānta ==
Svabhāvika Bhedābheda shares similarities with other Bhedābheda schools but also differs in key respects.

Unlike Advaita Vedānta, which posits an absolute non-duality and sees the world and individual souls as illusory, Svabhāvika Bhedābheda holds that both the world and souls are real and intrinsically related to Brahman, though distinct.

Like Ramanuja's Viśiṣṭādvaita, Svabhāvika Bhedābheda sees the world and souls as real and dependent on Brahman. However, Svabhāvika Bhedābheda emphasizes the natural co-existence of both unity and difference, whereas Viśiṣṭādvaita focuses on the qualified non-duality, where the world and souls are attributes of Brahman.

In contrast to Madhva's Dvaita Vedānta, which posits a strict dualism between the soul, world, and God, Svabhāvika Bhedābheda maintains a balance between difference and non-difference, holding that the relationship is naturally dual yet unified.

== Influence ==
Though less widely known than other Vedānta schools, Svābhāvika Bhedābheda has had a lasting influence, particularly within certain Vaiṣṇava traditions. Shrinivasacharya's contributions to the development of this doctrine are central, and it has influenced later Vedāntic thought by offering a middle path between strict dualism and non-dualism.

The doctrine also plays a role in ritual practices and devotional theology, where the relationship between the worshiper and the divine is seen as both intimate and distinct, reflecting the natural duality and unity between God and the individual.

== Bibliography ==
- Dasgupta, Surendranath (1988). A history of Indian philosophy. Delhi: Motilal Banarsidass. ISBN 978-81-208-0408-1.
- Goodding, Robert (2012). "Bhedbheda". In Cush, Denise; Robinson, Catherine; York, Michael (eds.). Encyclopedia of Hinduism. Routledge.
- Gupta, Tripta (2000). Vedānta-Kaustubha, a study (in English and Sanskrit). Delhi: Sanjay Prakashan. ISBN 978-81-7453-043-1.
- Radhakrishnan, Sarvepalli (2011). The Brahma Sutra: The Philosophy Of Spiritual Life. Literary Licensing, LLC. ISBN 978-1-258-00753-9.
- Ramnarace, Vijay (2014). Rādhā-Kṛṣṇa's Vedāntic Debut: Chronology & Rationalisation in the Nimbārka Sampradāya (PDF) (PhD thesis). University of Edinburgh.
- Bose, Roma (2004). Vedānta-pārijāta-saurabha of Nimbārka and Vedānta-kaustubha of Śrīnivāsa: commentaries on the Brahma-sutras; English translation. New Delhi: Munshiram Manoharlal Publishers. ISBN 978-81-215-1121-6.
- Agrawal, Madan Mohan (2013). Encyclopedia of Indian philosophies, Bhedābheda and Dvaitādvaita systems. Encyclopedia of Indian philosophies / general ed.: Karl H. Potter. Delhi: Motilal Banarsidass. ISBN 978-81-208-3637-2.
- Bhandarkar, R. G. (2014). Vaisnavism, Saivism and Minor Religious Systems (Routledge Revivals). Routledge. ISBN 978-1-317-58933-4.
- Buitenen, Johannes Adrianus Bernardus (1956). Rāmānuja's Vedārthasamgraha: introduction, critical edition and annotated translation.
- Nakamura, Hajime (2004). A History of Early Vedānta Philosophy Vol 2. Motilal Banarsidass Publ. ISBN 978-81-208-1963-4.
