= Yadava Prakasa =

Vedanta scholar and preceptor of Ramanuja

Yadava Prakasa (Sanskrit: यादवप्रकाश, romanized: Yādavaprakāśa) was a Bṛhaddevatā Vedanta scholar and a contemporary of Vaishnava acharya Ramanuja. He was one of the teachers of Ramanuja during the latter's early years in Kanchi. It is said that Ramanuja joined Yadava Prakaasa's school while he was only sixteen years old.

However, severe differences rose between them early on, over the interpretation of several Vedic texts and scriptures of Hinduism like Chandogya Upanishad. This eventually led Ramanuja to break away from Yadava Prakasa and expound his own school of thought known as Vishishtadvaita.

According to the Sri Vaishnava tradition, when Ramanuja was a student under Yadava Prakasa, the latter grew jealous of Ramanuja's rise to fame. So Yadava Prakasa tried to get rid of Ramanuja during a tour to the Ganges in north India. Govinda, Ramanuja's cousin, realised this and warned Ramanuja who then left the group and escaped to Kanchi with the help of an elderly hunter couple. Later, Yadava Prakasa realised his folly and became a disciple under Ramanuja.

== Tenets ==
Yadava Prakasa propounded a distinct interpretation of Bhedabheda, called Svābhāvika Bhedābhedavāda ("Natural Difference and Non-Difference"), asserting that Brahman, the ultimate reality, is inherently both different from and non-different from the world and individual souls. Yadava Prakasa asserts that the distinctions are inherent in Brahman's very nature, making the relationship between Brahman, individual souls, and the world intrinsic and eternal. He also supports that the universe and all beings are real transformations of Brahman, making Brahman both the source and the material cause of creation.

== Sources ==
- Nicholson, Andrew J. (2010). Unifying Hinduism: Philosophy and Identity in Indian Intellectual History. Columbia University Press. ISBN 978-0-231-14987-7.
