= Barhaspatya sutras =

Foundational texts of the nastika Cārvāka school

The Bārhaspatya sūtras (derived from the name of the author Brhaspati), or Lokāyata sutras are the foundational texts of the nastika Charvaka school of materialist philosophy.

This text has been lost, and is known only from fragmentary quotations. Dakshinaranjan Shastri in 1928 published 60 such verses. In 1959, he published 54 selected verses as Barhaspatya sutram. Shastri was of the opinion that many more fragments could be recovered. Ramkrishna Bhattacharya (2002) attempts a new reconstruction, with the caveat that the more verses are listed, the greater the uncertainty that it will be either misquoted or foreign materials included as a part of the text.

Most of the fragments are found in works dated to the Indian Middle Ages, roughly between the 8th and 12th centuries. The extensive 14th century treatise on Indian philosophy by Madhava Vidyaranya, the Sarvadarshanasamgraha, gives a detailed account of Charvaka, but it does not quote Charvaka texts directly, instead paraphrasing the doctrine according to the understanding of a learned 14th century Vedantin. Bhattacharya lists 68 items on 9 pages.

== See also ==
- Atheism in Hinduism
- Atman (Hinduism)
- Hindu philosophy
