= Hindu philosophy =

Philosophical traditions of Hinduism and the Vedas

Hindu philosophy or Vedic philosophy is the set of philosophical systems that developed in tandem with the first Hindu religious traditions during the iron and classical ages of India. In Indian philosophy, of which Hindu philosophy is a prominent subset, the word used for philosophy is darshan or darshana (Sanskrit: दर्शन, IAST: darśana; meaning: "viewpoint or perspective").

The distinct Hindu darshans largely correspond to the six āstika (Sanskrit: आस्तिक) or orthodox schools of Hindu philosophy, all of which accept the ancient Vedic texts as an authoritative source of knowledge. (Note: M Chadha (2015), in The Routledge Handbook of Contemporary Philosophy of Religion, states that Vedas were knowledge source but interpreted differently by different schools of Hindu philosophy: "The sacred texts of the Hindus, the Vedas, are variously interpreted by the six traditional Hindu philosophical schools. Even within a single school, philosophers disagree on the import of Vedic statements. (...) Hindu intellectual traditions must be understood as standing for the collection of philosophical views that share a textual connection. There is no single, comprehensive philosophical doctrine shared by all intellectual traditions in Hinduism that distinguishes their view from other Indian religions such as Buddhism or Jainism on issues of epistemology, metaphysics, logic, ethics or cosmology. The Vedas are regarded as Apauruseya, but, by the same token, they are not the Word of God either.) (Note: Elisa Freschi (2012): The Vedas are not deontic authorities in absolute sense and may be disobeyed, but are recognized as an epistemic authority by an orthodox school of Hindu philosophy; (Note: This differentiation between epistemic and deontic authority is true for all Indian religions)) Of the six orthodox Hindu schools, Samkhya (सांख्य) is the earliest school, embracing dualism; Yoga (योग) combines the metaphysics of Samkhya with meditation and breath techniques; Nyaya (न्याय) is a school of logic emphasising direct realism; Vaisheshika (वैषेशिक) is an offshoot of Nyaya concerned with atomism and naturalism; Mimamsa (मीमांसा) is a school justifying ritual, faith, and religious obligations; and Vedanta (वेदान्त) contains various traditions that mostly embrace nondualism.

The Indian philosophical landscape during the ancient and medieval periods also produced philosophical systems that share many concepts with the āstika traditions, yet at the same time reject or oppose several central Vedic concepts, such as Ātman, or interpret them in their own way. These have been called nāstika (heterodox or non-orthodox) philosophies, and they include: Buddhism, Jainism, Charvaka, Ajivika, and others.

Hindu philosophy also includes several sub-schools of theistic philosophies that integrate ideas from two or more of the six orthodox philosophies. Examples of such schools include: Pāśupata Śaiva, Śaiva siddhānta, Pratyabhijña, Raseśvara and Vaiṣṇava. Some sub-schools share Tantric ideas with those found in some Buddhist traditions, which are nevertheless found in the Puranas and the Āgamas.

Each school of Hindu philosophy has extensive epistemological literature called Pramana, as well as theories on metaphysics, axiology, and other topics.

== Classifications ==
In the history of India, the six orthodox schools had emerged before the start of the Common Era, and some schools emerged possibly even before the Buddha. Some scholars have questioned whether the orthodox and heterodox schools classification is sufficient or accurate, given the diversity and evolution of views within each major school of Indian philosophy, with some sub-schools combining heterodox and orthodox views.

Indian philosophy has been categorised into āstika and nāstika schools of thought, though this distinction was not clearly defined until the late medieval period. The orthodox schools of Indian philosophy have been called ṣaḍdarśana ('six systems'). This schema was created between the 12th and 16th centuries by Vedantins. It was then adopted by the early Western Indologists, and pervades modern understandings of Indian philosophy. Satoshi Ogura notes that scholars should keep in mind the tendency of classification of Indic knowledge in Persianate discourses and its legacies in modern writings in both India and the Western world.

=== Āstika ===
There are six āstika (orthodox) schools of thought. (Note: For an overview of the six orthodox schools, with detail on the grouping of schools, see: Radhakrishnan and Moore, "Contents", and pp. 453–487.) Each is called a darshan, and each darshan accepts the Vedas as authority.

Darshan (Sanskrit: दर्शन, IAST: darśana; meaning: "viewpoint or perspective") comes from the Sanskrit root 'दृश' (drish) meaning 'to see, to experience'. Thus the etymological meaning of Darshan is "दृश्यते अनेन इति दर्शनम्", meaning that through which one sees. A Darshan tries to answer the fundamental questions of the existence of mankind, the nature of this world, and the creator.

Each āstika darśana also accepts the premise that Atman (eternal Self) exists. The āstika schools of philosophy are:

1. Samkhya – The earliest school with a strong dualist theoretical exposition of consciousness (purusha) and matter (prakriti). Agnostic with respect to God or the gods.
2. Yoga – A monotheistic school which emerged from Samkhya and emphasises practical use of Samkhya theory: meditation, contemplation and liberation.
3. Nyaya or logic – The school of epistemology which explores sources of knowledge emphasising direct realism.
4. Vaisheshika – An empiricist school of atomism and naturalism, emerged as an offshoot of Nyaya.
5. Mīmāṃsā – An anti-ascetic and anti-mysticist school of orthopraxy. This tradition is also known as Pūrva-Mīmāṁsā because of its focus on the earlier (pūrva) Vedic texts dealing with rituals, faith, and religious obligations, and similarly also known as Karma-Mīmāṁsā due to its focus on ritual action (karma).
6. Vedanta – They focus on the last segment of knowledge in the Vedas, or jñānakāṇḍa ('section of knowledge'). Vedanta is also referred to as Uttara-Mimamsa. Vedānta came to be the dominant current of Hinduism in the medieval period. This school considers the Upanishads, the Brahma Sutras, and the Bhagvad Gita as authoritative texts.

=== Nāstika ===
Schools that do not accept the authority of the Vedas are nāstika philosophies, of which four nāstika (heterodox) schools are prominent:

1. Charvaka, a materialism school that accepted the existence of free will.
2. Ājīvika, a materialism school that denied the existence of free will.
3. Buddhism, a philosophy that denies existence of ātman (Self) and is based on the teachings and enlightenment of Gautama Buddha.
4. Jainism, a philosophy that accepts the existence of the ātman (Self), and is based on the teachings and enlightenment of twenty-four teachers known as tirthankaras, with Rishabha as the first and Mahavira as the twenty-fourth.

These nāstika schools of thought are thus regarded as Indian but almost never as Hindu. Western scholars have debated the relationship and differences within āstika philosophies and with the nāstika philosophies, starting with the writings of Indologists and Orientalists of the 18th and 19th centuries, based on limited availability of Indian literature and medieval doxographies. The various sibling traditions included in Indian philosophies are diverse and are united by: shared history and concepts, textual resources, ontological and soteriological focus, and cosmology. Some ambiguity arises from the word Hindu being an exonym historically used as a geographical and cultural identifier for people living in the Indian subcontinent, sometimes regardless of their beliefs.

=== Other schools ===
Besides the major orthodox and non-orthodox schools, there have existed syncretic sub-schools that have combined ideas and introduced new ones of their own. The medieval scholar Madhavacharya, identified by some as Vidyaranya, in his book 'Sarva-Darsana-Sangraha', includes 16 philosophical systems current as of 14th century. Along with some of the major orthodox and non-orthodox schools and sub-schools, it includes the following sub-schools:

- Pashupata Shaivism, developed by Nakulisa
- Shaiva Siddhanta, the theistic Sankhya school
- Pratyabhijña, the recognitive school of Kashmir Shaivism, Trika
- Raseśvara, a Shaiva school that advocated the use of mercury to reach immortality
- The Pāṇinīya

The above sub-schools introduced their own ideas while adopting concepts from orthodox schools of Hindu philosophy such as realism of the Nyāya, naturalism of Vaiśeṣika, monism and knowledge of Self (Atman) as essential to liberation of Advaita, self-discipline of Yoga, asceticism and elements of theistic ideas. Some sub-schools share Tantric ideas with those found in some Buddhist traditions.

== Characteristics ==
School	Sankhya	Yoga	Nyāya	Vaiśeṣika	Mīmāṃsā	Advaita Vedanta (Note: Advaita, Vishishtadvaita and Dvaita have evolved from an older Vedanta school and all of them accept Upanishads and Brahma Sutras as standard texts.)	Vishishtadvaita Vedanta	Dvaita Vedanta	Shuddhadvaita	Achintya Bheda Abheda	Akshar-Purushottam Darśana	Pashupata	Shaiva Siddhanta	Kashmir Shaivism	Raseśvara	Pāṇini Darśana
Classification	rationalism, dualism	dualism, spiritual practice	realism, logic, analytic philosophy	naturalism, atomism	exegesis, philology, ritualism	non-dualism, pantheism	qualified non-dualism, panentheism	dualism, theology	pure non-dualism	simultaneous non-dualism and dualism	qualified non-dualism, panentheism	theism, spiritual practice	dualism	theistic non-dualism, idealism	alchemy	linguistics, philosophy of language
Philosophers	Kapila, Iśvarakṛṣṇa, Vācaspati Miśra, Guṇaratna, and more..	Patañjali, Yajnavalkya, Vyasa (Note: Vyasa wrote a commentary on the Yoga Sutras called Samkhyapravacanabhasya.(Radhankrishnan, Indian Philosophy, London, George Allen & Unwin Ltd., 1971 edition, Volume II, p. 344.))	Aksapada Gautama, Vātsyāyana, Udayana, Jayanta Bhatta more..	Kanada, Praśastapāda, Śridhara's Nyāyakandalī more..	Jaimini, Kumārila Bhaṭṭa, Prabhākara more..	Gaudapada, Adi Shankara, Madhusudana Saraswati, Vidyaranya more..	Yamunacharya, Ramanuja more..	Madhvacharya, Jayatirtha, Vyasatirtha, Raghavendra Swami	Vallabhacharya	Chaitanya Mahaprabhu, Six Goswamis of Vrindavana, Visvanatha Chakravarti, Krishnadasa Kaviraja, Baladeva Vidyabhushana, Rupa Goswami, more..	Bhagwan Swaminarayan, Shastriji Maharaj, Bhadreshdas Swami	Haradattacharya, Lakulish	Tirumular, Meikandadevar, Appayya Dikshita, Sadyojyoti, Aghorasiva	Vasugupta, Abhinavagupta, Jayaratha	Govinda Bhagavat, Sarvajña Rāmeśvara	Pāṇini, Bhartṛhari, Kātyāyana
Texts	Samkhyapravachana Sutra, Samkhyakarika, Sāṁkhya tattvakaumudī more..	Yoga Sutras, Yoga Yajnavalkya, Samkhya pravacana bhasya	Nyāya Sūtras, Nyāya Bhāṣya, Nyāya Vārttika more..	Vaiśeṣika Sūtra, Padārtha dharma saṁgraha, Daśapadārtha śāstra more..	Purva Mimamsa Sutras, Mimamsasutra bhāshyam more..	Brahma Sutras, Prasthanatrayi, Avadhuta Gita, Ashtavakra Gita, Pañcadaśī more..	Siddhitrayam, Sri Bhasya, Vedartha Sangraha	AnuVyakhana, Brahma Sutra Bahshya, Sarva Shāstrārtha Sangraha, Tattva prakashika, Nyaya Sudha, Nyayamruta, Tarka Tandava, DwaitaDyumani	Brahmasutra Anubhashya, Tattvartha Dipa Nibandha, Subodhiniji, Shodasha Grantha	Bhagavata Purana, Bhagavad Gita, Sat Sandarbhas, Govinda Bhashya, Chaitanya Charitamrita,	Swaminarayan Bhashyam, Swaminarayan-Siddhanta-Sudha	Gaṇakārikā, Pañchārtha bhāshyadipikā, Rāśikara bhāshya	Sivagamas, Tirumurais, Meikanda Sastras	Shiva Sutras of Vasugupta, Tantraloka	Rasārṇava, Rasahṛidaya, Raseśvara siddhānta	Vākyapadīya, Mahabhashya, Vārttikakāra
Concepts Originated	Purusha, Prakṛti, Guṇa, Satkāryavāda	Yama, Niyama, Asana, Pranayama, Pratyahara, Dhāraṇā, Dhyana, Samadhi	Pratyakṣa, Anumāna, Upamāna, Anyathakyati vada, Niḥśreyasa more..	Padārtha, Dravya, Sāmānya, Viśeṣa, Samavāya, Paramāṇu	Apauruṣeyātva, Arthāpatti, Anuapalabdhi, Satahprāmāṇya vāda	Jivanmukta, Mahāvākyas, Sādhana Chatuṣṭaya, three orders of reality, Vivartavada	Hita, Antarvyāpi, Bahuvyāpi more..	Prapacha, Mukti-yogyas, Nitya-samsarins, Tamo-yogyas	Pushtimarg, Brahmavada, Brahma Sambandha	Sambandha, Abhidheya, Prayojana (Relationship, Process, Ultimate Goal)	Akshar Purushottam Upasana	Pashupati, eight pentads	Charya, Mantramārga, Rodha Śakti	Citi, Mala, Upaya, Anuttara, Aham, Svatantrya	Pārada, three modes of mercury	Sphoṭa, Ashtadhyayi

== Overview ==
=== Epistemology ===
Epistemology is called pramana. It has been a key, much debated field of study in Hinduism since ancient times. Pramāṇa is a Hindu theory of knowledge and discusses the valid means by which human beings can gain accurate knowledge. The focus of pramāṇa is how correct knowledge can be acquired, how one knows, how one does not, and to what extent knowledge pertinent about someone or something can be acquired.

Ancient and medieval Hindu texts identify six pramāṇas as correct means of accurate knowledge and truths:

1. Pratyakṣa – Direct perception
2. Anumāṇa – Inference or indirect perception
3. Upamāṇa – Comparison and analogy
4. Arthāpatti – Postulation, derivation from circumstances
5. Anupalabdi – Non-perception, absence of proof
6. Shabda – Word, testimony of past or present reliable experts

Each of these are further categorised in terms of conditionality, completeness, confidence and possibility of error, by the different schools. The schools vary on how many of these six are valid paths of knowledge. For example, the Cārvāka nāstika philosophy holds that only one (perception) is an epistemically reliable means of knowledge, the Samkhya school holds that three are (perception, inference and testimony), while the Mīmāṃsā and Advaita schools hold that all six are epistemically useful and reliable means to knowledge.

== Sāmkhya ==
Sāmkhya (Sanskrit: सांख्य) is the oldest of the orthodox philosophical systems in Hinduism, with origins in the 1st millennium BCE. It is a rationalist school of Indian philosophy, and had a strong influence on other schools of Indian philosophies. Sāmkhya is an enumerationist philosophy whose epistemology accepted three of six pramāṇas as the only reliable means of gaining knowledge. These were pratyakṣa (perception), anumāṇa (inference) and sabda (Āptavacana, word/testimony of reliable sources).

Samkhya school espouses dualism between witness-consciousness and 'nature' (mind, perception, matter). It regards the universe as consisting of two realities: Puruṣa (witness-consciousness) and prakriti ('nature'). Jiva (a living being) is that state in which puruṣa is bonded to prakriti in some form. This fusion, state the Samkhya scholars, led to the emergence of buddhi (awareness, intellect) and ahankara (individualised ego consciousness, "I-maker"). The universe is described by this school as one created by Purusa-Prakriti entities infused with various permutations and combinations of variously enumerated elements, senses, feelings, activity and mind.

Samkhya philosophy includes a theory of gunas (qualities, innate tendencies, psyche). Guna, it states, are of three types: Sattva being good, compassionate, illuminating, positive, and constructive; Rajas guna is one of activity, chaotic, passion, impulsive, potentially good or bad; and Tamas being the quality of darkness, ignorance, destructive, lethargic, negative. Everything, all life forms and human beings, state Samkhya scholars, have these three gunas, but in different proportions. The interplay of these gunas defines the character of someone or something, of nature and determines the progress of life. Samkhya theorises a pluralism of Selfs (Jeevatmas) who possess consciousness. Samkhya has historically been theistic or non-theistic, and there has been debate about its specific view on God.

The Samkhya karika, one of the key texts of this school of Hindu philosophy, opens by stating its goal to be "three kinds of human suffering" and means to prevent them. The text then presents a distillation of its theories on epistemology, metaphysics, axiology and soteriology. For example, it states,

From the triad of suffering, arises this inquiry into the means of preventing it.
That is useless – if you say so, I say: No, because suffering is not absolute and final. – Verse 1

The Guṇas (qualities) respectively consist in pleasure, pain and dullness, are adapted to manifestation, activity and restraint; mutually domineer, rest on each other, produce each other, consort together, and are reciprocally present. – Verse 12
Goodness is considered to be alleviating and enlightening; foulness, urgent and persisting; darkness, heavy and enveloping. Like a lamp, they cooperate for a purpose by union of contraries. – Verse 13

There is a general cause, which is diffuse. It operates by means of the three qualities, by mixture, by modification; for different objects are diversified by influence of the several qualities respectively. – Verse 16
Since the assemblage of perceivable objects is for use (by man); Since the converse of that which has the three qualities with other properties must exist (in man); Since there must be superintendence (within man); Since there must be some entity that enjoys (within man); Since there is a tendency to abstraction (in man), therefore soul is. – Verse 17

— Samkhya karika,

The soteriology in Samkhya aims at the realisation of Puruṣa as distinct from Prakriti; this knowledge of the Self is held to end transmigration and lead to absolute freedom (kaivalya).

== Yōga ==
In Indian philosophy, Yōga (Sanskrit: योग) is, among other things, the name of one of the six āstika philosophical schools. The Yoga philosophical system aligns closely with the dualist premises of the Samkhya school. The Yoga school accepts Samkhya psychology and metaphysics, but is considered theistic because it accepts the concept of personal god (Ishvara, unlike Samkhya. The epistemology of the Yoga school, like the Sāmkhya school, relies on three of six prāmaṇas as the means of gaining reliable knowledge: pratyakṣa (perception), anumāṇa (inference) and śabda (āptavacana, word/testimony of reliable sources).

The universe is conceptualised as a duality in Yoga school: puruṣa (witness-consciousness) and prakṛti (mind, perception, matter); however, the Yoga school discusses this concept more generically as "seer, experiencer" and "seen, experienced" than the Samkhya school.

A key text of the Yoga school is the Yoga Sutras of Patanjali. Patanjali may have been, as Max Müller explains, "the author or representative of the Yoga-philosophy without being necessarily the author of the Sutras." Hindu philosophy recognises many types of Yoga, such as rāja yoga, jñāna yoga, karma yoga, bhakti yoga, tantra yoga, mantra yoga, laya yoga, and hatha yoga.

The Yoga school builds on the Samkhya school theory that jñāna (knowledge) is a sufficient means to moksha. It suggests that systematic techniques/practice (personal experimentation) combined with Samkhya's approach to knowledge is the path to moksha. Northrop Frye describes Yoga as a form of 'experimental mysticism'. Whilst the Yoga school has a 'sharp disagreement' with the Advaita school, Advaita philosophical praxis does advocate the use of yogic practices as indirectly valuable. Like Advaita Vedanta, the Yoga school of Hindu philosophy holds that liberation/freedom in this life is achievable, and that this occurs when an individual fully understands and realises the equivalence of Atman (Self) and Brahman. The Nyāya-Vaiśeṣika schools accept the efficacy of yogic practices.

== Vaiśeṣika ==
The Vaiśeṣika (Sanskrit: वैशेसिक) philosophy is a naturalist school. It is a form of atomism in natural philosophy. It postulates that all objects in the physical universe are reducible to paramāṇu (atoms), and that one's experiences are derived from the interplay of substance (a function of atoms, their number and their spatial arrangements), quality, activity, commonness, particularity and inherence. Knowledge and liberation are achievable by complete understanding of the world of experience, according to Vaiśeṣika school. The Vaiśeṣika darśana is credited to Kaṇāda Kaśyapa from the second half of the first millennium BCE. The foundational text, the Vaiśeṣika Sūtra, opens as follows:

Dharma is that from which results the accomplishment of Exaltation and of the Supreme Good. The authoritativeness of the Veda arises from its being an exposition of dharma. The Supreme Good results from knowledge, produced from a particular dharma, of the essence of the Predicables, Substance, Attribute, Action, Genus, Species and Combination, by means of their resemblances and differences.

— Vaiśeṣika Sūtra 1.1.1–1.1.4,

The Vaiśeṣika school is related to the Nyāya school but features differences in its epistemology, metaphysics and ontology. The epistemology of the Vaiśeṣika school, like Buddhism, accepted only two means to knowledge as reliable – perception and inference. The Vaiśeṣika school and Buddhism both consider their respective scriptures as indisputable and valid means to knowledge, the difference being that the scriptures held to be a valid and reliable source by Vaiśeṣikas were the Vedas.

Vaiśeṣika metaphysical premises are founded on a form of atomism, that reality is composed of four substances (earth, water, air, and fire). Each of these four are of two types: atomic (paramāṇu) and composite. An atom is, according to Vaiśeṣika scholars, that which is indestructible (anitya), indivisible, and has a special kind of dimension, called "small" (aṇu). A composite, in this philosophy, is defined to be anything which is divisible into atoms. Whatever human beings perceive is composite, while atoms are invisible. The Vaiśeṣikas stated that size, form, truths and everything that human beings experience as a whole is a function of atoms, their number and their spatial arrangements, their guṇa (quality), karma (activity), sāmānya (commonness), viśeṣa (particularity) and amavāya (inherence, inseparable connectedness of everything).

== Nyāya ==
The Nyāya (Sanskrit: न्याय) school is a realist āstika philosophy. The school's most significant contributions to Indian philosophy were its systematic development of the theory of logic, methodology, and its treatises on epistemology. The foundational text of the Nyāya school is the Nyāya Sūtras of the first millennium BCE. The text is credited to Aksapada Gautama and its composition is variously dated between the sixth and second centuries BCE.

Nyāya epistemology accepts four out of six prāmaṇas as reliable means of gaining knowledge – pratyakṣa (perception), anumāṇa (inference), upamāṇa (comparison and analogy) and śabda (word, testimony of past or present reliable experts).

In its metaphysics, the Nyāya school is closer to the Vaiśeṣika school than the others. It holds that human suffering results from mistakes/defects produced by activity under wrong knowledge (notions and ignorance). Moksha (liberation), it states, is gained through right knowledge. This premise led Nyāya to concern itself with epistemology, that is, the reliable means to gain correct knowledge and to remove wrong notions. False knowledge is not merely ignorance to Naiyayikas; it includes delusion. Correct knowledge is discovering and overcoming one's delusions, and understanding the true nature of the soul, self and reality. The Nyāya Sūtras begin:

Perception, Inference, Comparison and Word – these are the means of right knowledge.
Perception is that knowledge which arises from the contact of a sense with its object and which is determinate, unnameable and non-erratic.
Inference is knowledge which is preceded by perception, and is of three kinds: a priori, a posteriori, and commonly seen.
Comparison is the knowledge of a thing through its similarity to another thing previously well known.
Word is the instructive assertion of a reliable person.
It [knowledge] is of two kinds: that which is seen, and that which is not seen.
Soul, body, senses, objects of senses, intellect, mind, activity, fault, transmigration, fruit, suffering and release – are the objects of right knowledge.

— Nyāya Sūtras 1.1.3–1.1.9,

The Nyāya school uses a three-fold procedure: enumeration, definition, and examination. This procedure of enumeration, definition, and examination is recurrent in Navya-Nyāya texts like The Manual of Reason (Tarka-Sangraha).

== Mīmāṃsā ==
The Mīmāṃsā (Sanskrit: मीमांसा) school emphasises religious hermeneutics and exegesis. It is a form of philosophical realism. Key texts of the Mīmāṃsā school are the Purva Mimamsa Sutras of Jaimini. The classical Mīmāṃsā school is sometimes referred to as pūrvamīmāṃsā or Karmamīmāṃsā in reference to the first part of the Vedas.

The Mīmāṃsā school has several sub-schools defined by epistemology. The Prābhākara subschool of Mīmāṃsā accepted five means to gaining knowledge as epistimetically reliable: pratyakṣa (perception), anumāṇa (inference), upamāṇa (comparison and analogy), arthāpatti (postulation, derivation from circumstances), and śabda (word, testimony of past or present reliable experts). The Kumārila Bhaṭṭa sub-school of Mīmāṃsā added a sixth way of knowing to its canon of reliable epistemology: anupalabdi (non-perception, negative/cognitive proof).

The metaphysics of the Mīmāṃsā school consists of both atheistic and theistic doctrines, and the school showed little interest in systematic examination of the existence of God. Rather, it held that the Self (Atma) is an eternal, omnipresent, inherently active spiritual essence, then focussed on the epistemology and metaphysics of dharma. To them, dharma meant rituals and duties, not devas (gods), because devas existed only in name. The Mīmāṃsākas held that the Vedas are "eternal authorless infallible", that Vedic vidhi (injunctions) and mantras in rituals are prescriptive karya (actions), and that the rituals are of primary importance and merit. They considered the Upanishads and other texts related to self-knowledge and spirituality to be of secondary importance, a philosophical view that the Vedanta school disagreed with.

Mīmāṃsā gave rise to the study of philology and the philosophy of language. While their deep analysis of language and linguistics influenced other schools, their views were not shared by others. Mīmāṃsākas considered the purpose and power of language was to clearly prescribe the proper, correct and right. In contrast, Vedantins extended the scope and value of language as a tool to also describe, develop and derive. Mīmāṃsākas considered orderly, law-driven, procedural life as the central purpose and noblest necessity of dharma and society, and divine (theistic) sustenance means to that end. The Mimamsa school was influential and foundational to the Vedanta school, with the difference that Mīmāṃsā developed and emphasises karmakāṇḍa (the portion of the śruti which relates to ceremonial acts and sacrificial rites, the early parts of the Vedas), while the Vedanta school developed and emphasises jñānakāṇḍa (the portion of the Vedas that relates to knowledge of monism, the latter parts of the Vedas).

== Vedānta ==
The Vedānta (Sanskrit: वेदान्त) school built upon the teachings of the Upanishads, the Bhagvad Gita and the Brahma Sutras from the first millennium BCE is the most developed and best-known of the Hindu schools. The epistemology of the Vedantins included, depending on the sub-school, five or six methods as proper and reliable means of gaining any form of knowledge: pratyakṣa (perception), anumāṇa (inference), upamāṇa (comparison and analogy), arthāpatti (postulation, derivation from circumstances), anupalabdi (non-perception, negative/cognitive proof) and śabda (word, testimony of past or present reliable experts). All of these have been further categorised by each sub-school of Vedanta in terms of conditionality, completeness, confidence and possibility of error.

The emergence of the Vedanta school represented a period in which a more knowledge-centered understanding began to emerge, focusing on jnana (knowledge) driven aspects of the Vedic religion and the Upanishads. These included metaphysical concepts such as Ātman and Brahman, and an emphasis on meditation, self-discipline, self-knowledge and abstract spirituality, rather than ritualism. The Upanishads were variously interpreted by ancient- and medieval-era Vedanta scholars. Consequently, the Vedanta developed into many sub-schools, ranging from theistic dualism to non-theistic monism, each interpreting the texts in its own way and producing its own series of sub-commentaries.

=== Advaita ===
Advaita literally means "not two, sole, unity". It is a sub-school of Vedanta, and asserts spiritual and universal non-dualism. Its metaphysics is a form of absolute monism, that is all ultimate reality is interconnected oneness. This is the oldest and most widely acknowledged Vedantic school. The foundational texts of this school are the Brahma Sutras and the early Upanishads from the 1st millennium BCE. Its first great consolidator was the 8th century scholar Adi Shankara, who continued the line of thought of the Upanishadic teachers, and that of his teacher's teacher Gaudapada. He wrote extensive commentaries on the major Vedantic scriptures and is celebrated as one of the major Hindu philosophers from whose doctrines the main currents of modern Indian thought are derived.

According to this school of Vedanta, all reality is Brahman, and there exists nothing whatsoever which is not Brahman. Its metaphysics includes the concept of māyā and ātman. Māyā connotes "that which exists, but is constantly changing and thus is spiritually unreal". The empirical reality is considered as always changing and therefore "transitory, incomplete, misleading and not what it appears to be". The concept of ātman is of one Atman, with the light of Atman reflected within each person as jivatman. Advaita Vedantins assert that ātman is same as Brahman, and this Brahman is reflected within each human being and all life, all living beings are spiritually interconnected, and there is oneness in all of existence. They hold that dualities and misunderstanding of māyā as the spiritual reality that matters is caused by ignorance, and are the cause of sorrow and suffering. Jīvanmukti (liberation during life) can be achieved through Self-knowledge, the understanding that ātman within one person is same as ātman in another person and all of Brahman – the eternal, unchanging, entirety of cosmic principles and true reality.

Some believe that Shankara is a "closet Buddhist," suggesting as evidence his positions that selfhood is illusory and an experience of it disappears after one attains enlightenment. However, Shankara does believe that there is an enduring reality that is ultimately real. He specifically rejects Buddhist propositions in his commentary on Brahma Sutras 2.2.18, 2.2.19, 2.2.20, 2.2.25, among others.

=== Viśiṣṭādvaita ===
Ramanuja (c. 1037–1137) was the foremost proponent of the philosophy of Viśiṣṭādvaita or qualified non-dualism. Viśiṣṭādvaita advocated the concept of a Supreme Being with essential qualities or attributes. Viśiṣṭādvaitins argued against the Advaitin conception of Brahman as an impersonal empty oneness. They saw Brahman as an eternal oneness, but also as the source of all creation, which was omnipresent and actively involved in existence. To them the sense of subject-object perception was illusory and a sign of ignorance. However, the individual's sense of self was not a complete illusion since it was derived from the universal beingness that is Brahman. Ramanuja saw Vishnu as a personification of Brahman.

The Viśiṣṭādvaita sub-school also disagrees with the Advaita claim that misconception (avidyā) is indescribable as either real or unreal (anirvacanīya). It sees this as a contradiction, and argues that avidyā must either be non-different from Brahman or different from Brahman. If it is different from Brahman, the non-dualist position of Shankara is given up, but if it is non-different, it must exist ultimately as Brahman. Ramanuja claims that avidyā cannot be identical with Brahman because Brahman is pure knowledge, and avidyā is absence of knowledge. Ramanuja also argues that the Advaita position cannot coherently maintain that Brahman is non-intentional consciousness (consciousness that does not have an object), because all cognitions are necessarily about something.

=== Dvaita ===
Dvaita refers to a theistic sub-school in Vedanta tradition of Hindu philosophy. Also called Tattvavāda and Bimbapratibimbavāda, the Dvaita sub-school was founded by the 13th-century scholar Madhvacharya. The Dvaita Vedanta school believes that God (Vishnu, Paramatman) and the individual Selfs (Atman) (jīvātman) exist as independent realities, and these are distinct.

Dvaita Vedanta is a dualistic interpretation of the Vedas; it espouses dualism by theorising the existence of two separate realities. The first and the only independent reality, states the Dvaita school, is that of Vishnu or Brahman. Vishnu is the Paramatman, in a manner similar to monotheistic God in other major religions. The distinguishing factor of Dvaita philosophy, as opposed to monistic Advaita Vedanta, is that God takes on a personal role and is seen as a real eternal entity that governs and controls the universe. Like Vishishtadvaita Vedanta sub-school, Dvaita philosophy also embraced Vaishnavism, with the metaphysical concept of Brahman in the Vedas identified with Vishnu and the one and only Supreme Being. However, unlike Vishishtadvaita which envisions ultimate qualified nondualism, the dualism of Dvaita was permanent. Dvaita sub-school disagrees with the Vishishtadvaita claim that Brahman is linked with the individual self and the world, in the way that a soul is linked with its body. Madhvacharya argues that Brahman cannot be the material cause of the world.

Salvation, in Dvaita, is achievable only through the grace of God Vishnu.

=== Dvaitādvaita (Bhedabheda) ===
Dvaitādvaita was proposed by Nimbarkacharya, a 7th-century Vaishnava philosopher from the Andhra region which was further propounded by his disciple Srinivasacharya. According to this philosophy there are three categories of existence: Brahman, Self, and matter. Self and matter are different from Brahman in that they have attributes and capacities different from Brahman. Brahman exists independently, while Self and matter are dependent. Thus Self and matter have an existence that is separate yet dependent. Further, Brahman is a controller, the Self is the enjoyer, and matter the thing enjoyed. Also, the highest object of worship is Krishna and his consort Radha, attended by thousands of gopis; of the Vrindavan; and devotion consists in self-surrender.

=== Śuddhādvaita ===
Śuddhādvaita is the "purely non-dual" philosophy propounded by Vallabha Acharya (1479–1531). The founding philosopher was also the guru of the Vallabhā sampradāya ("tradition of Vallabh") or Puṣṭimārga, a Vaishnava tradition focused on the worship of Krishna. Vallabhacharya enunciates that Brahman has created the world without connection with any external agency such as Māyā (which itself is His power) and manifests Himself through the world. That is why Shuddhadvaita is known as "Unmodified transformation" or "Avikṛta Pariṇāmavāda". Brahman or Ishvara desired to become many, and he became the multitude of individual Selfs and the world. The Jagat or Maya is not false or illusionary, the physical material world is. Vallabha recognises Brahman as the whole and the individual as a "part" (but devoid of bliss) like sparks and fire. This sub-school thus denies the Advaita conception of Maya because the world is considered to be real insofar as it is non-different from Brahman, who is believed to be Krishna.

=== Acintya Bheda Abheda ===
Chaitanya Mahaprabhu (1486–1534), stated that the Self or energy of God is both distinct and non-distinct from God, whom he identified as Krishna, Govinda, and that this, although unthinkable, may be experienced through a process of loving devotion (bhakti). He followed the Dvaita concept of Madhvacharya. In accordance with the Vishnu Purana, this sub-school ascribes six virtues to God (Bhagavan): power (aishvarya), potency (virya), fame (yasha), prosperity (shri), knowledge (jnana), and renunciation (vairagya). The potency of Bhagavan, which is transcendental, is not conceivable to humans and its relationship to Bhagwan is characterised as one in which there is "inconceivable difference in non-difference" (acintya-bhedabheda). This potency has divisions that are described within Jiva Gosvami's Bhagavat Sandarbha, which comments on the internal potency, and Paramatma Sandarbha, which elaborates the marginal and external potencies of Bhagavan. Maya, which is central to advaita, is the external potency of Bhagavan, which is controlled by Paramatma, an expansion of Bhagavan. And, Brahman is included within Bhagavan, who is the object of meditation and realisation for bhakti-yogis.

== Cārvāka ==
The Cārvāka (Sanskrit: चार्वाक) school is one of the nāstika or "heterodox" philosophies. It rejects supernaturalism, emphasises materialism and philosophical skepticism, holding empiricism, perception and conditional inference as the proper source of knowledge. Cārvāka is an atheistic school of thought. It holds that there is neither afterlife nor rebirth, all existence is mere combination of atoms and substances, feelings and mind are an epiphenomenon, and free will exists.

Bṛhaspati is sometimes referred to as the founder of Cārvāka (also called Lokayata) philosophy. Much of the primary literature of Cārvāka, the Barhaspatya sutras (ca. 600 BCE), however, are missing or lost. Its theories and development has been compiled from historic secondary literature such as those found in the shastras, sutras and the Indian epic poetry as well as from the texts of Buddhism and from Jain literature. The Tattvôpaplava-siṁha by the skeptic philosopher Jayarāśi Bhaṭṭa has been considered by many scholars to be an unorthodox Cārvāka text.

One of the widely studied principles of Cārvāka philosophy was its rejection of inference as a means to establish valid, universal knowledge, and metaphysical truths. In other words, the Cārvāka epistemology states that whenever one infers a truth from a set of observations or truths, one must acknowledge doubt; inferred knowledge is conditional.

== Shaivism ==
Early history of Shaivism is difficult to determine. However, the Śvetāśvatara Upanishad (400 – 200 BCE) is considered to be the earliest textual exposition of a systematic philosophy of Shaivism. Shaivism is represented by various philosophical schools, including non-dualist (abheda), dualist (bheda), and non-dualist-with-dualist (bhedābheda) perspectives. Vidyaranya in his works mentions three major schools of Shaiva thought: Pashupata Shaivism, Shaiva Siddhanta and Pratyabhijña (Kashmir Shaivism).

=== Pāśupata Shaivism ===
Pāśupata Shaivism (Pāśupata, 'of Paśupati') is the oldest of the major Shaiva schools. The philosophy of Pashupata sect was systematised by Lakulish in the 2nd century CE. Paśu in Paśupati refers to the effect (or created world), the word designates that which is dependent on something ulterior. Whereas, Pati means the cause (or principium), the word designates the Lord, who is the cause of the universe, the pati, or the ruler. Pashupatas disapproved of Vaishnava theology, known for its doctrine servitude of Selfs to the Supreme Being, on the grounds that dependence upon anything could not be the means of cessation of pain and other desired ends. They recognised that those depending upon another and longing for independence will not be emancipated because they still depend upon something other than themselves. According to Pāśupatas, Self possesses the attributes of the Supreme Deity when it becomes liberated from the 'germ of every pain'.

Pāśupatas divided the created world into the insentient and the sentient. The insentient was the unconscious and thus dependent on the sentient or conscious. The insentient was further divided into effects and causes. The effects were of ten kinds, the earth, four elements and their qualities, colour etc. The causes were of thirteen kinds, the five organs of cognition, the five organs of action, the three internal organs, intellect, the ego principle and the cognising principle. These insentient causes were held responsible for the illusive identification of Self with non-Self. Salvation in Pāśupata involved the union of the Self with God through the intellect.

=== Shaiva Siddhanta ===
Considered normative Tantric Shaivism, Shaiva Siddhanta provides the normative rites, cosmology and theological categories of Tantric Shaivism. Being a dualistic philosophy, the goal of Shaiva Siddhanta is to become an ontologically distinct Shiva (through Shiva's grace). This tradition later merged with the Tamil Saiva movement and expression of concepts of Shaiva Siddhanta can be seen in the bhakti poetry of the Nayanars.

=== Kashmir Shaivism ===
Kashmir Shaivism arose during the eighth or ninth century CE in Kashmir and made significant strides, both philosophical and theological, until the end of the twelfth century CE. It is categorised by various scholars as monistic idealism (absolute idealism, theistic monism, realistic idealism, transcendental physicalism or concrete monism). It is a school of Śaivism consisting of Trika and its philosophical articulation Pratyabhijña.

Even though, both Kashmir Shaivism and Advaita Vedanta are non-dual philosophies which give primacy to Universal Consciousness (Chit or Brahman), in Kashmir Shavisim, as opposed to Advaita, all things are a manifestation of this Consciousness. This implies that from the point of view of Kashmir Shavisim, the phenomenal world (Śakti) is real, and it exists and has its being in Consciousness (Chit). However, Advaita holds that Brahman is the reality (pure consciousness) and it is inactive (niṣkriya) and the phenomenal world is an appearance (māyā). The objective of human life, according to Kashmir Shaivism, is to merge in Shiva or Universal Consciousness, or to realise one's already existing identity with Shiva, by means of wisdom, yoga and grace.

== See also ==
- Āstika and nāstika
- Pramana
- Vedas
- Buddhism and Hinduism
- Indian philosophy
- Buddhist philosophy
- Hindu idealism
- Hindu denominations
- Metaphilosophy
- Dharma
- Asrama
- Origin of language

== Bibliography ==
- Upadhyay, Baldev (1957). Bharatiya Darshan Vol 1 (in Hindi). Benaras Sharada Mandir.
- Chatterjee, Satischandra; Datta, Dhirendramohan (1984). An Introduction to Indian Philosophy (Eighth Reprint ed.). Calcutta: University of Calcutta.
- Dyczkowski, Mark S. G. (1987). The Doctrine of Vibration: An Analysis of the Doctrines and Practices of Kashmir Shaivism. Albany, New York: State University of New York Press. ISBN 0-88706-432-9.
- Guttorm Fløistad (28 February 1993). Philosophie asiatique/Asian philosophy. Springer Netherlands. ISBN 978-0-7923-1762-3.
- Flood, Gavin (1996). An Introduction to Hinduism. Cambridge University Press. ISBN 978-0-521-43878-0.
- Flood, Gavin, ed. (2003). The Blackwell Companion to Hinduism. Malden, MA: Blackwell Publishing Ltd. ISBN 1-4051-3251-5.
- Flood, Gavin (2005). The Tantric Body: The Secret Tradition of Hindu Religion. I. B. Tauris. ISBN 1845110110.
- Grimes, John A. (1989). A Concise Dictionary of Indian Philosophy: Sanskrit Terms Defined in English. SUNY Press. ISBN 978-0-7914-0100-2.
- King, Richard (2007), Indian Philosophy. An Introduction to Hindu and Buddhist Thought, Georgetown University Press
- Lochtefeld, James G. (2002). The Illustrated Encyclopedia of Hinduism: N-Z. The Rosen Publishing Group. ISBN 978-0-8239-3180-4.
- Madhavacharya (1882). The Sarva-Darśana-Saṃgraha or Review of the Different Systems of Hindu Philosophy. Trübner's Oriental Series. Translated by E.B. Cowell and A.E. Gough. London: Trübner & Co.
- Müeller, Max (1899). Six Systems of Indian Philosophy; Samkhya and Yoga, Naya and Vaiseshika. Calcutta: Susil Gupta (India) Ltd. ISBN 0-7661-4296-5. Reprint edition; Originally published under the title of The Six Systems of Indian Philosophy.
- Nicholson, Andrew J. (2010), Unifying Hinduism: Philosophy and Identity in Indian Intellectual History, Columbia University Press
- Nicholson, Andrew J. (2013). Unifying Hinduism: Philosophy and Identity in Indian Intellectual History. Columbia University Press. ISBN 978-0-231-14987-7.
- Perrett, Roy W. (2000). Philosophy of Religion. Taylor & Francis. ISBN 978-0-8153-3611-2.
- Potter, Karl H. (1991). Presuppositions of India's Philosophies. Motilal Banarsidass. p. 98. ISBN 978-81-208-0779-2.
- Radhakrishnan, S.; Moore, CA (1957). A Sourcebook in Indian Philosophy. Princeton. ISBN 0-691-01958-4.
