= Hindu atheism =

Atheism in Hinduism

Hindu atheism or Hindu non-theism, which is known as Nirīśvaravāda (Sanskrit: Sanskrit: निरीश्वर्वाद, romanized: nirīśvarvāda, lit. 'Argument against the existence of Ishvara') has been a historically propounded viewpoint in many of the Āstika (Orthodox) streams of Hindu philosophy. Hindu spiritual atheists, agnostics or non-theists who affirm the sanctity of the Vedas and the concept of Brahman, as well as those who follow āstika (orthodox) philosophies but reject personal god(s), are also called Dharmic atheists, Vedic atheists or Sanatani atheists.

In current Indian languages, such as Hindi or Bengali, āstika and its derivatives usually mean 'theist', and nāstika and its derivatives denote an 'atheist'; however, the two terms in ancient- and medieval-era Sanskrit literature do not refer to 'theism' or 'atheism'. In ancient India, āstika meant those who affirmed the sanctity of the Vedas, ātman and Brahman, while nāstika, by contrast, are those who deny all the aforementioned definitions of āstika; they do not believe in the existence of self or Ishvara (God) and reject the sanctity of the Vedas.

Sometimes nāstika philosophies are also considered as a part of Hindu philosophy because the word 'Hindu' is actually an exonym and historically, the term has also been used as a geographical, cultural, and later religious identifier for people living in the Indian subcontinent. Many scholars, such as S. Radhakrishnan, Surendranath Dasgupta and Chandradhar Sharma, consider the Nāstika philosophies, i.e. the Indian 'Heterodox' Philosophies like Buddhism, Jainism and Charvaka, to be distinct schools of philosophies, while some others consider them parts of Hindu philosophy. Although Buddhism initially started as yet another school of Indian philosophy with neutral or undiscussed views of most other philosophies, its spread through the Silk Road during the rule of emperor Ashoka, eventually led to a religious kind of self-organisation with structure, rituals and practises.

There are six major orthodox (āstika) schools of Hindu philosophy — Nyaya, Vaisheshika, Samkhya, Yoga, Mīmāṃsā and Vedanta. Among them, Samkhya, Yoga and Mimamsa, while not rejecting either the Vedas or Brahman, typically reject a personal god, creator god, or a god with attributes.

Some schools of thought view the path of atheism as a valid one, but difficult to follow in matters of spirituality.

== Etymology ==
The Sanskrit term Āstika ("pious, believer") refers to the systems of thought which admit the validity of the Vedas. Sanskrit asti means "there is", and Āstika (per Pāṇini 4.2.60) derives from the verb, meaning "one who says 'asti'". Technically, in Hindu philosophy, the term Āstika refers only to affirming the Vedas, not a belief in the existence of a god.

However, even when philosophers professed allegiance to the Vedas, their allegiance did little to fetter the freedom of their speculative ventures. On the contrary, the acceptance of the authority of the Vedas was a convenient way for a philosopher's views to become acceptable to the orthodox, even if a thinker introduced a wholly new idea. Thus, the Vedas could be cited to corroborate a wide diversity of views; they were used by the Vaisheshika thinkers (i.e., those who believe in ultimate particulars, both individual souls and atoms) as much as by the non-dualist Advaita Vedanta philosophers.

== Historical development ==
The Rig Veda, the oldest of the Vedas, deals with significant skepticism around the fundamental question of a divine creator and the createdness of the universe. It does not, in many instances, categorically accept the existence of a creator, or if it seemingly does so, it still remains skeptical about the capacity of such a god. Nasadiya Sukta (Creation Hymn) of the Rig Veda states:

Whence was it produced? Whence is this creation?
The gods came afterwards, with the creation of this universe.

Whence this creation has arisen,
perhaps it formed itself, or perhaps it did not.
The one who looks down on it, in the highest heaven,
only he knows, or perhaps he does not know.

— Rig Veda, chapter 10, hymn 129, verses 6 (partial) and 7

The Brihadaranyaka, Isha, Mundaka (in which Brahman is everything and "no-thing") and especially the Chandogya Upanishads have also been interpreted as atheistic because of their stress on the subjective self. In the Brihadaranyaka Upanishad (800 BCE), early arguments were made against the emphasis on a personal god.

If a man knows "I am Brahman (ultimate self)" in this way, he becomes this whole world. Not even the gods are able to prevent it, for he becomes their very self (Atman). So when a man venerates another deity, thinking, "He is one, and I am another," he does not understand. As livestock is for men, so is he for the gods. As having a lot of livestock is useful to a man, so each man proves useful to the gods. The loss of even a single head of livestock is painful; how much more if many are lost. The gods, therefore, are not pleased at the prospect of men coming to understand this.

— Brihadaranyaka Upanishad, Hymn 1.4.10

Mimamsa is a realistic, pluralistic school of philosophy which was concerned with the exegesis of the Vedas. The core text of the school were the Purva Mimamsa Sutras of Jaimini (c. 200 BCE–200 CE). Mimamsa philosophers believed that the revelation of the Vedas was sacred, authorless (apaurusheyatva) and infallible, and that it was essential to preserve the sanctity of the Vedic ritual to maintain Dharma (cosmic order). As a consequence of the belief in sanctity of the ritual, Mimamsas rejected the notion of gods in any form. Later commentators of the Mimamsa sutras such as Prabhākara (c. 7th century CE) advanced arguments against the existence of a god. The early Mimamsa not only refused the idea of a deity, but said that human action itself was enough to create the necessary circumstances for the enjoyment of its fruits.

Samkhya is a strongly dualistic orthodox (āstika) school of Indian Hindu philosophy that's ambivalent about the concept of a god. The earliest surviving authoritative text on classical Samkhya philosophy is the Samkhyakarika (c. 350–450 CE) of Iśvarakṛṣṇa. The Samkhyakarika is silent on the issue of Isvara's (the creator god's) existence or nonexistence, although first millennium commentators, such as Gaudapada, understand the text as being compatible with some concept of a god. However, the Samkhya Sutra (14th c. CE) and its commentaries explicitly attempt to disprove a god's existence through reasoned argument.

== Arguments against existence of a god in Hindu philosophy ==
Mimamsas argued that there was no need to postulate a maker for the world, just as there was no need for an author to compose the Vedas or a god to validate the rituals. They further thought that the gods named in the Vedas had no physical existence apart from the mantras that speak their names. In this regard, the power of the mantras was what was seen as the power of gods. Mimamsas reasoned that an incorporeal god could not author the Vedas, for he would not have the organs of speech to utter words. An embodied god could not author the Vedas either because such a god would be subject to the natural limitations of sensory knowledge and therefore, would not be able to produce supernatural revelations like the Vedas.

Samkhya gave the following arguments against the idea of an eternal, self-caused, creator god:

- If the existence of karma is assumed, the proposition of a god as a moral governor of the universe is unnecessary. For, if a god enforces the consequences of actions then he can do so without karma. If however, he is assumed to be within the law of karma, then karma itself would be the giver of consequences and there would be no need of a god.
- Even if karma is denied, god still cannot be the enforcer of consequences. Because the motives of an enforcer god would be either egoistic or altruistic. Now, god's motives cannot be assumed to be altruistic because an altruistic god would not create a world so full of suffering. If his motives are assumed to be egoistic, then god must be thought to have desire, as agency or authority cannot be established in the absence of desire. However, assuming that god has desire would contradict god's eternal freedom which necessitates no compulsion in actions. Moreover, desire, according to Samkhya, is an attribute of prakriti and cannot be thought to grow in god. The testimony of the Vedas, according to Samkhya, also confirms this notion.
- Despite arguments to the contrary, if a god is still assumed to contain unfulfilled desires, this would cause him to suffer pain and other similar human experiences. Such a worldly god would be no better than Samkhya's notion of higher self.
- Furthermore, there is no proof of the existence of god. He is not the object of perception, there exists no general proposition that can prove him by inference and the testimony of the Vedas speak of prakriti as the origin of the world, not God.

Therefore, Samkhya maintained not only that the various cosmological, ontological and teleological arguments could not prove god, but that god as normally understood—an omnipotent, omniscient, omnibenevolent creator who is free from suffering—cannot exist.

The Indian Nobel Prize-winner Amartya Sen, in an interview with Pranab Bardhan for the California Magazine published in the July–August 2006 edition by the University of California, Berkeley states:

In some ways people had got used to the idea that India was spiritual and religion-oriented. That gave a leg up to the religious interpretation of India, despite the fact that Sanskrit had a larger atheistic literature than what exists in any other classical language. Madhava Acharya, the remarkable 14th century philosopher, wrote this rather great book called Sarvadarshansamgraha, which discussed all the religious schools of thought within the Indian structure. The first chapter is "Atheism" – a very strong presentation of the argument in favor of atheism and materialism.

== Demographics ==
=== India ===
A 2021 nationwide survey by the Pew Research Center found that 2% of the self-described Indian Hindus didn't believe in God, while 18% believe in God but "with less certainty".

=== Canada ===
A 2022 study by Cardus found that 15% of the self-described Canadian Hindus don't believe in "God or a Higher Power".

=== United States ===
A 2025 study by the Pew Research Center found that 15% of the self-described American Hindus "don't believe in God or a universal spirit and they are certain in this belief".

== Notable Hindu atheists ==
- Jawaharlal Nehru, famed Indian independence activist and first Prime Minister of India was described as a 'Hindu agnostic', and styled himself as a "scientific humanist".
- Brahmananda Swami Sivayogi was an atheist and rationalist who founded the organization Ananda Mahasabha.
- Vinayak Damodar Savarkar, a leading figure of Hindu Mahasabha, founded and promoted the principles of Hindutva, a Hindu nationalist ideology. Savarkar was an atheist who saw Hinduism as a cultural identity rather than a religious one. Savarkar wanted to "minimize the importance of religion in his definition of Hindu".
- Shreela Flather, Baroness Flather of Windsor and Maidenhead, the first Hindu woman in British politics. She has described herself as a "Hindu atheist". Broadly, she is an atheist with affinity to aspects of Hindu culture such as dress and diet.
- Raj Patel stated in an interview with The New Yorker that he grew up a theist Hindu but is now an atheist Hindu.
- S. S. Rajamouli, most known for directing Baahubali, Baahubali 2 and RRR, in a March 2022 interview he stated that "I don't believe in God or religion the way it is portrayed now. if you ask me 'Do you believe in the existence of God?' I'd say 'I don't know'." Rajamouli said that he is not a Hindu in the religious sense, but considering it as Dharma, he is 'very much' a Hindu. "I am a follower of Hindu dharma", he said.
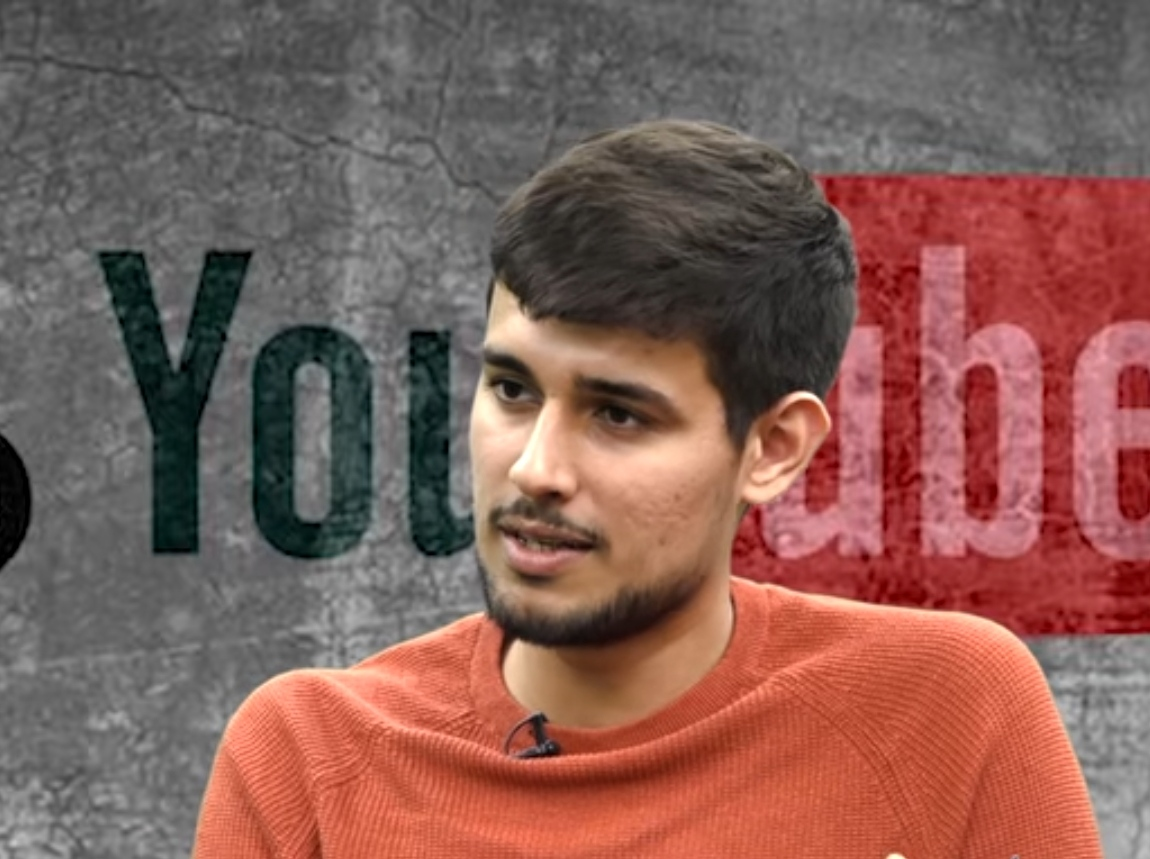
- Indian YouTuber, vlogger, and social media activist Dhruv Rathee has identified himself as a "Hindu atheist"
  Dhruv Rathee, an Indian YouTuber, vlogger and social media activist. Known for his YouTube videos on social, political and environmental issues has also identified himself as "Hindu atheist" in his 25 Million Special Q&A video.

== See also ==
- Adevism
- Āstika and nāstika
- Atheism
- Hindu views on evolution
- Irreligion in India
- Nontheistic religion
- Śramaṇa
