= Madhusūdana Sarasvatī =

Indian philosopher in the Advaita Vedānta tradition

Personal life
- Born: Kamalanayana; 1490 CE Bengal, India
- Died: 1580 CE Bengal, India

Religious life
- Religion: Hinduism
- Philosophy: Advaita, Vaishnavism

Madhusūdana Sarasvatī (c.1490–1580) was an Indian philosopher in the Advaita Vedānta tradition and devotee of Krishna. He was the disciple of Viśveśvara Sarasvatī and Mādhava Sarasvatī.

Madhusūdana composed Advaitasiddhi, a line-by-line refutation of Nyayamṛta. In response to Advaitasiddhi, the Dvaita scholars, Vyasa Ramacharya, and Ananda Bhattaraka, wrote Nyayamṛta Tarangini and Nyayamṛta Kantakoddhara and challenged Madhusūdana Sarasvatī.

== Birth and education ==
Madhusūdana was born in a Vaishnava Brahmin family in a village named Unashia situated in the present-day Kotalipara division of Gopalganj district near Faridpur in Bangladesh. According to a family genealogy, his father was named Pramod Purandaracharya Chakraborty. The pre-monastic (Pūrvāśrama) name of Madhusūdana Sarasvatī (Saraswatī) was Kamalnayan Chakraborty, and he belonged to the Pashchatya Vedic Brahmin community of Kotalipara. He was educated in the Navya-Nyāya tradition at Nabadwip under reputed scholars of those days like Harirama Tarkavagisha and Mathuranath Tarkavagisha, but later undertook sannyasa from a sannyāsi of Dashanami Sampradaya named Vishvesvara Sarasvati, and moved to Varanasi in order to study Advaita Vedanta.

== Works ==
Madhusūdana wrote a number of works on Advaita Vedānta and devotion, including Advaitasiddhi, which is described as his "most outstanding work". The text opposes the Dvaita Vedānta positions and arguments in Vyāsatīrtha's Nyāyāmṛta.

Madhusūdana's work also include Vedāntakalpalatikā, Sārasangraha on Sarvajñātmā's Saṅkṣēpa-śārīrika, and Siddhāntabindu (a commentary on Shankara's Daśaślokī). Another work attributed to him is Īśvarapratīpatti-prakāś, but its authorship is uncertain. He also composed commentaries on the Bhagavad Gīta, on parts of the Bhāgavata Purāņa, and others. His commentary on Bhagavad Gita, Gudhartha-dipika, contains interpretations that sometimes differ those of Shankara.

In Aufrecht's Catalogus Catalogorum, twenty-two books have been ascribed to Madhusūdana, but the authorship of several attributed works is uncertain.

=== List of Works ===
- Advaitasiddhi (अद्वैतसिद्धिः)
- Advaitamanjari (अद्वैतमञ्जरी)(?)
- Advaita-ratna-raksana (अद्वैतरत्नरक्षणम्)
- Atma-bodha-tika (आत्मबोधटीका)
- Ananda-mandakini (आनन्दमन्दाकिनी)
- Prasthanabheda (प्रस्थानभेदः)
- Bhagavad-gita-gudhartha-dipika (भगवद्गीता-गूढार्थदीपिका)
- Vedanta-kalpa-latika (वेदान्तकल्पलतिका)
- Sastra-siddhanta-lesa-tika (शास्त्रसिद्धान्तलेशटीका)
- Samksepa-sariraka-sara-samgraha (सङ्क्षेपशारीरकसारसङ्ग्रहः)
- Siddhanta-tatva-bindu (सिद्धान्ततत्त्वबिन्दुः / सिद्धान्तबिन्दुः)
- Pramahamsa-priya (परमहंसप्रिया - भागवताद्यश्लोकव्याख्या)
- Veda-stuti-tika (वेदस्तुतिटीका)
- Asta-vikriti-vivarana (अष्टविकृतिविवरणम्)
- Rajanam-prtibodha(?)
- Isvara-pratipatti-prakasa (ईश्वरप्रतिपत्तिप्रकाशः)
- Bhagavata-bhakti-rasayana (भगवद्भक्तिरसायनम्)
- Krishna-kutuhala-nataka (कृष्णकुतूहलम्)
- Bhakti-samanya-nirupana (भक्तिसामान्यनिरूपणम्) (?)
- Sandilya-sutra-tika (शाण्डिल्यभक्तिसूत्रटीका)
- Hari-lila-vakhya (हरिलीलाव्याख्या)
- shivamahimnastotra-TIkA (शिवमहिम्नःस्तोत्रटीका)

=== Quotes on Madhusudana Saraswati ===
Madhusūdana was so accomplished in Navya Nyaya (New logic) techniques that the following verse is quoted about him when he visited Nabadvipa, the center for learning in Nyaya Shastra,

नवद्वीपे समायाते मधुसूदनवाक्पतौ

चकम्पे तर्कवागीशः कातरोऽभूद्गदाधरः

Meaning: When Madhusudana, the master of speech, came to navadvipa, Mathuranatha tarkavagisha (who was the foremost navya naiyayika during those times) trembled (with fear) and Gadadhara (another logician of great repute) became afraid.

A few words about the authors. Madhusudana Sarasvati is a towering giant among advaitins. An oft quoted verse regarding him is,

मधुसूदनसरस्वत्याः पारं वेत्ति सरस्वती पारं वेत्ति सरस्वत्याः मधुसूदनसरस्वती

Meaning: (Only) the Goddess of Learning, Saraswati knows the limits of (knowledge of) Madhusūdana Sarasvati. And Madhusūdana Sarasvati knows the limits of Goddess Sarasvati (Knowledge).

=== Follower of Bhakti Yoga ===
Madhusūdana Sarasvatī was a great devotee of Krishna. Just like Appayya Dikshita, who integrated Sivādvaita into Advaita Vedanta, Madhusūdana bridged the Satvata school of Pancaratra Vaishnavism and Advaita Vedanta philosophy. Madhusūdana boldly differs from Adi Shankara in some of his interpretations of the Brahma Sutras and the Gītā, although he salutes Adi Shankara and Suresvara in the most reverential terms. Madhusūdana places a greater emphasis on the path of devotion (bhakti), while Shankara emphasizes knowledge (jnana) as the primary means to liberation. Tradition also recounts that Viṭṭhalesa, the son of Vallabha of the Suddhadvaita school, studied under Madhusūdana Sarasvatī, who thus forms a crucial link between Advaita Vedanta and many Vaishnava sects in the north.

=== Sevenfold steps to liberation ===
Madhusūdana Sarasvatī draws upon the Yogavasistha detailing of seven stages of yogic practice leading to self-realization and the end of avidya (ignorance). It begins with preparatory practices like acquiring knowledge and detachment, progresses to engaging in reflective dialogues, deep meditation, and the revelation of reality. In the last three stages, focus is on attaining the state of jivanmukti (liberation while living). The last three stages involves achieving complete detachment through determinate samadhi (while voluntarily returning to worldly consciousness), living in heightened detachment, and complete ease and surrender. The final stage is where bodily functions are sustained by God marking attainment of jivanmukti.

== Disciples ==
Dasgupta notes that Purusottama, Balabhadra, and Sesagovinda were disciples of Madhusudana Sarasvati. Purusottama wrote a commentary on Madhusudana's Siddhanta-bindu. Sesagovinda wrote the Sarva-siddhanta-rahasya-tika, a commentary on the Sarva-darsana-siddhanta-samgraha, attributed to Shankara.

== Relation with Akbar ==
According to a Dashanami legend, Madhusudana Sarasvati complained to the Mughal emperor Akbar about Muslim attacks on Hindu ascetics. Akbar's courtier Birbal suggested that Sarasvati initiate non-Brahmin members in his group and arm them. This legend has been passed down through oral tradition, and its historicity is not confirmed by historical texts. However, J. N. Farquhar believed that it had some historical basis.

== Sources ==
- Dasgupta, Surendranath (1932). History of Indian philosophy vol.2.
- Gupta, Sanjukta (2013). Advaita Vedanta and Vaisnavism: The Philosophy of Madhusudana Sarasvati. Routledge. ISBN 978-1-134-15774-7.
- Karl H. Potter, "Madhusūdana Sarasvatī" (in Robert L. Arrington [ed.]. A Companion to the Philosophers. Oxford: Blackwell, 2001. ISBN 0-631-22967-1)
- Sarvepalli Radhakrishnan, et al. [edd], History of Philosophy Eastern and Western: Volume One (George Allen & Unwin, 1952)
- Sharma, B. N. Krishnamurti (2000). A History of the Dvaita School of Vedānta and Its Literature, 3rd Edition. Motilal Banarsidass (2008 Reprint). ISBN 978-8120815759.
