= Adevism =

Denial of gods

Adevism (from the Sanskrit term deva, on the analogy of atheism) is a term introduced by Friedrich Max Müller to imply the denial of gods, in particular, the legendary gods of Vedic Hinduism. Müller used it in the Gifford Lectures in connection with the Vedanta philosophy, for the correlative of ignorance or nescience. In modern contexts it is rarely found, though it is sometimes used to represent a disbelief in any gods, contrasted with a specific disbelief in the Judaeo-Christian deity (God). Adevism is not to be confused with atheism, which is the denial of a god or gods. Adevism is used extremely infrequently in writing, probably because of the much used term atheism, which sounds similar.

== See also ==
- Hindu atheism
- Nastika
- Zoroastrianism
- Asura
- Ahura Mazda
- Daeva
- Deva (Hinduism)
- Secular Buddhism
