= Sarva-siddhanta Sangraha =

Compendium of 7 Indian Philosophies

Sarva-darsana-siddhanta Sangraha, or simply Sarva-Siddhānta-Saṅgrahaḥ (Sanskrit: सर्व-सिद्धान्त-सङ्ग्रहः) is a work by Madhvacharya written in 14th century which sketches eleven major systems of thought of different Indian schools of philosophy during that period in the Indian sub-continent.

== Chapters ==
The eleven systems of philosophy covered in the work are listed below.

=== Non-Vedic schools ===
These unorthodox schools fall under Nāstika, who reject Vedas as an authoritative system.

1. Lokāyata (or Cārvāka)
2. Arhata philosophy (or Jainism)
3. Buddhism
  1. Mādhyamika
  2. Yogācāra
  3. Sautrāntika
  4. Vaibhāṣika

=== Vedic schools ===
The Āstika systems described here consider Vedas as a reliable and authoritative source of knowledge.

1. Vaiśeṣika
2. Naiyāyika
3. Theory of Prabhākara
4. Theory of Bhaṭṭācārya
5. Sāṅkhya
6. System of Patañjali
7. System of Veda-Vyāsa
8. Vedānta

== Related works ==
Adi Shankaracharya is also said to have authored Sarva Vedānta Siddhānta Sāra Saṅgraha (A Summary of the Essence of the Established Conclusions from All the Upaniṣads), also known as The Quintessence of Vedanta. This work is later said to have inspired Madhavacharya (also known as Vidyaranya) to write Sarva-darsana Sangraha, a compendium of 16 schools of philosophy during the 12th century CE.

== See also ==
Sarva-Darsana-Sangraha
