= Sarva-Darsana-Sangraha =

14th century text on Indian philosophy

Sarva-darśana-sangraha (Sanskrit: सर्वदर्शनसंग्रह; transl. A Compendium of all the Philosophical Systems) is a philosophical text by the 14th-century Indian scholar Mādhavāchārya. In the book, Mādhavāchārya reviews the sixteen philosophical systems current in India at the time, and gives what appeared to him to be their most important tenets, and the principal arguments by which their followers endeavoured to maintain them. Mādhavāchārya is usually identified with Vidyaranya, the Jagadguru of the Śringeri Śarada Pītham from ca. 1374-1380 until 1386. However, this has been contested by various scholars.

In the course of his sketches Madhava frequently explains at length obscure details in the different systems. The systems are arranged from the Advaita-point of view. According to Sarvepalli Radhakrishnan, the Sarvadarśanasaṅgraha "sketches sixteen systems of thought so as to exhibit a gradually ascending series, culminating in the Advaita Vedanta (or non-dualism)."

== Author ==
The Text is usually attributed to Mādhavāchārya, who is usually identified with Vidyāranya, the Jagadguru of the Śringeri Śarada Pītham from ca. 1374-1380 until 1386. According to tradition, Vidyaranya helped establish the Vijayanagara Empire sometime in 1336, and served as a mentor and guide to three generations of Vijayanagara kings. Vidyaranya is thought to have been named Madhava before taking ordination as a sannyasin. However, Vidyaranya's authorship of the text has been contested by various scholars.

Some accounts identify Madhavacharya or Vidyaranya with Madhava, the brother of Sāyaṇa, a Mimamsa scholar from the Vijayanagara Empire. In his attempt to clarify the identification of Madhava with Vidyaranya, Narasimhachar (1916, 1917) named this Madhava [B], distinguishing him from Madhava [A], a device also followed by Rama Rao (1930; 1931; 1934), and Kulke (1985). Mid 14th century, Madhava [B] served as a minister in the Vijayanagara Empire, and wrote several works, including, according to Rama Rao, the Jivanmuktiviveka, a work usually attributed to Vidyaranya, due to his identification with Madhava [B]. According to the Sringeri account, the brothers Madhava and Sayana came to Vidyaranya to receive his blessings, and completed his unfinished Veda bhashyas.

While the Sarvadarśanasaṅgraha is usually attributed to Madhava [B], and thereby to Vidyaranya, Madhava [B] was probably not the author of the text. According to Clark, the author may have been Channibhatta (Chinna or Chennu):

...a most insightful analysis by Thakur (1961) indicates that the author of the SDS was Channibhatta (Chinna or Chennu), son of Sahajasarvajña Vishnu Bhattopadhyaya, who was also a preceptor to Sāyaṇa and Mādhava [B]. Channibhatta was a younger contemporary of Sāyaṇa and Madhava, author of a sub-commentary on the Pañchapadikavivarana, and worked in the Vijayanagara court under the patronage of Harihara Maharaja. The SDS shares many passages and quotations from Channibhatta’s other works. Thakur suggests that the plan of the work may have originated with Madhava, and been written by Channibhatta, with the help of Sāyaṇa and Madhava.

== Chapters ==
The Sarvadarśanasaṅgraha contains chapters, each dedicated to a specific school of Indian philosophy prevalent in 14th-century Southern India. The systems of philosophy expounded by Madhava in the text are:

1. Chārvāka
2. Buddhism
3. Arhata or Jainism
4. Ramanuja System or Sri Vaishnavism
5. Purna-Prajña Darsana or Tatva-vaada or Dvaita Vedanta
6. Nakulisa-Paśupata
7. Shaivism
8. Pratyabhijña (Kashmir Shaivism) or Recognitive System
9. Raseśvara or Mercurial System
10. Vaisheshika or Aulukya
11. Akshapada or Nyaya
12. Jaimini
13. Pāṇiniya
14. Samkhya
15. Patanjala or Yoga
16. Vedanta or Adi Shankara

Cowell states that the systems are arranged from Vedantic point of view and form a "gradually ascending scale" with Chārvāka and Buddhism placed lowest as systems "furthest removed" from Vedanta, and Samkhya and Yoga placed nearest as those "approaching most nearly" to Vedanta, Sarvepalli Radhakrishnan notes that the text "sketches sixteen systems of thought so as to exhibit a gradually ascending series, culminating in the Advaita Vedanta (or non-dualism)."

The Sarvadarśanasaṅgraha itself does not contain the 16th chapter on Advaita Vedanta, or the system of Adi Shankara. The absence is explained by a paragraph at the end of the 15th chapter, the Patanjali-Darsana. It says: “The system of Shankara, which comes next in succession, and which is the crest-gem of all systems, has been explained by us elsewhere, it is, therefore, left untouched here”.

Madhvacharya tries to refute, chapter by chapter, the other systems of thought prominent in his day. Other than Buddhist and Jaina philosophies, Vidyaranya draws quotes directly from the works of their founders or leading exponents and it also has to be added that in this work, with remarkable mental detachment, he places himself in the position of an adherent of sixteen distinct philosophical systems.

Sarvadarśanasaṅgraha is one of the few available sources of information about Lokayata, the materialist system of philosophy in ancient India. In the first chapter, "The Chārvāka System", he critiques the arguments of lokayatikas. While doing so, he quotes extensively from Cārvāka works. Some of these arguments may be a caricature of lokayata philosophy. Yet in the absence of any original work of lokayatikas, it is one of the very few sources of information available today on materialist philosophy in ancient India.

== See Also ==
Sarva-siddhanta Sangraha

== Sources ==
- Clark, Matthew (2006), The Daśanāmī-saṃnyāsīs. The Integration Of Ascetic Lineages Into An Order, BRILL
- Cowell, E.B.; Gough, A. E. (1882). Sarva-Darsana Sangraha of Madhava Acharya: Review of Different Systems of Hindu Philosophy. New Delhi: Indian Books Centre/Sri Satguru Publications. ISBN 81-703-0875-5.
- Dalal, Roshen (2010). Hinduism: An Alphabetical Guide. Penguin. ISBN 978-0-14-341421-6.
- Goodding, Robert A. (2013), "A Theologian in a South Indian Kingdom: The Historical Context of the Jivanmuktiviveka of Vidyaranya", in Lindquist, Steven E. (ed.), Religion and Identity in South Asia and Beyond: Essays in Honor of Patrick Olivelle, Anthem Press
- Jackson, William J. (2016), Vijayanagara Voices: Exploring South Indian History and Hindu Literature, Routledge
- Slaje, Walter (April 1998), "On Changing Others' Ideas: The Case of Vidraranya and the Yogavasishta", Indo-Iranian Journal, 41 (2): 103–124, doi:10.1163/000000098124992448, S2CID 162189856
