= Meikandadevar =

Meikanda Thevar (c. 11th century CE) was a Hindu poet and expert in Hindu metaphysics and theology.

== Personal life ==
Meikandadevar was born Shvetavana Perumal in the town of Venneinallur situated on the Pennar River.

== Works ==
Meikandadevar was a student of Paranjothi Tampiran. The most popular of his compositions is Sivagnana Bodham, a metaphysical and theological treatise.
