= Vidyaranya =

Indian author and guru (1296–1391)

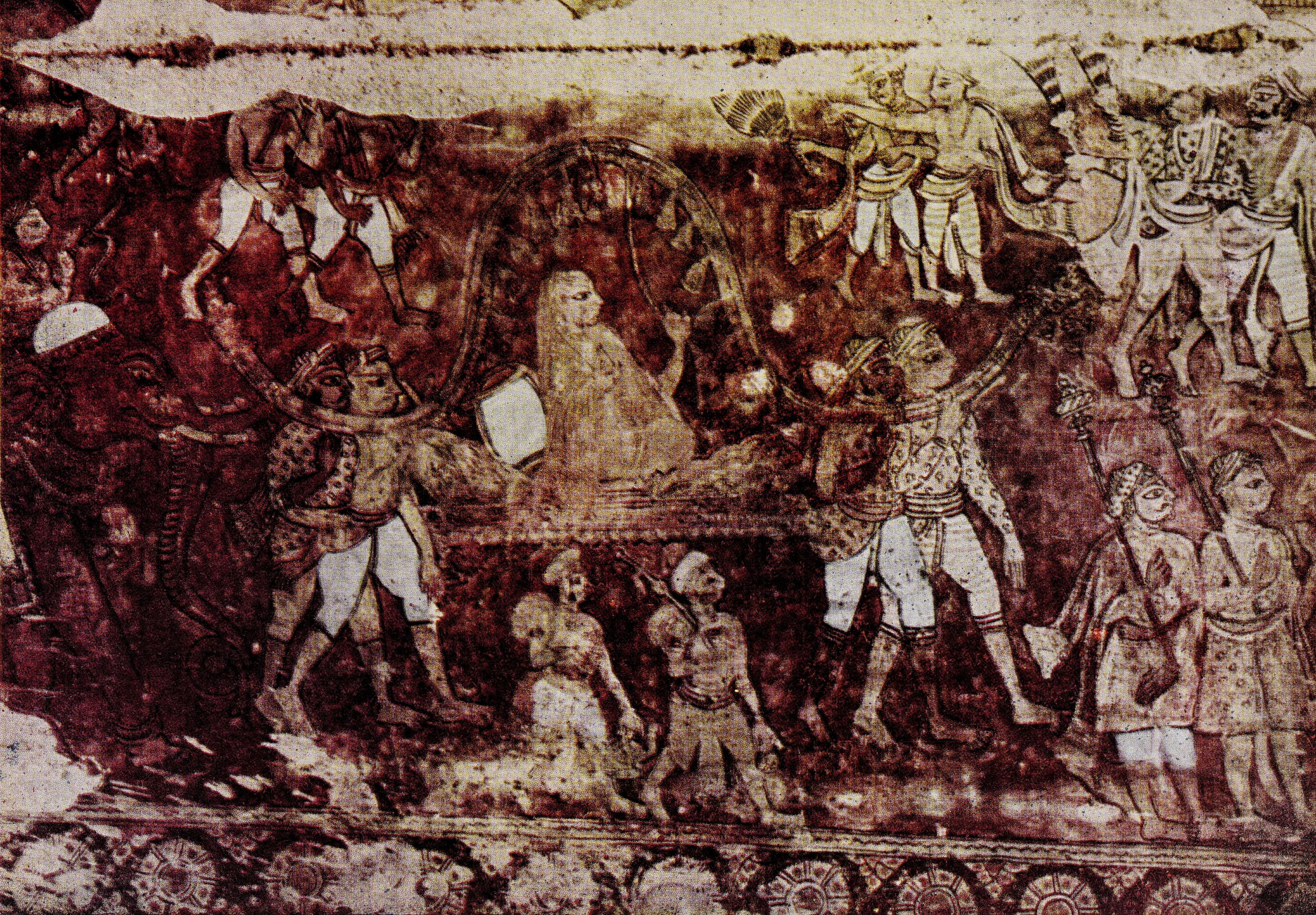
- Procession of Vidyaranya c.15th Century

Personal life
- Born: 1296 Kakatiya Empire,Warangal, Telangana
- Died: 1391 (aged 94–95) Hampi, Vijayanagara Empire

Religious life
- Religion: Hinduism
- Ordination: 1380

12th Jagadguru Shankaracharya of Sringeri Sharada Peetham
- In office 1380–1386
- Preceded by: Bharati Tirtha
- Succeeded by: Chandrasekhara Bharati I

Vidyaranya (IAST: Vidyāraṇya), was the jagadguru of the Sringeri Sharada Peetham from ca. 1374–1380 until 1386. Vidyāraṇya, who is thought to have been named Madhava before taking ordination as a sannyasin, is usually identified with Mādhavācārya (not to be confused with Madhvāchārya (13th c.)), the supposed author of the Sarvadarśanasaṅgraha, a compendium of different philosophical schools of Hindu philosophy. According to tradition, after ordination at an old age, Madhava took the name of Vidyaranya, became the Jagadguru of the matha at Sringeri, and wrote the Pañcadaśī, an important text for Advaita Vedanta.

According to tradition, Vidyaranya helped establish the Vijayanagara Empire sometime in 1336, and served as a mentor and guide to three generations of kings who ruled over it. The historical accuracy of this account is doubtful, and may have originated as late as 200 years after the events, as a "political foundation myth, an ideological attempt to represent the authority of the Vijayanagara state as deriving directly from that of the Sultanate."

The Vidyashankara temple in Sringeri is the samadhi of Vidya shankara, the guru of Vidyaranya which was built over the former's samadhi by his disciple Harihara. It is maintained by the Archaeological Survey of India. Vidyaranya's samadhi is located in Hampi, Karnataka.

== Biography ==
=== Dating ===
The dating of Vidyaranya is unclear. According to Jackson, Vidyaranya was born between 1280 and 1285. According to the records of the Sringeri Sharada Peetham, Vidyaranya was born in c. 1296 CE in Ekasila Nagara (present-day Warangal).

According to Sringeri matha, Vidyaranya was ordained as a sannyasin in 1331. (Note: sringeri.net, Biography of Sri Vidyaranya) According to Goodding, Vidyaranya ordained at old age; Rosen Dalal mentions the year 1377.

He was the jagadguru (spiritual head) of the Sringeri Sharada Peetham (Sringeri matha) from ca. 1374–1380 (Note: Jagadguru: from the early 1330s, 1377, or 1380) until 1386 CE. According to Slaje, "[t]here is positive epigraphical evidence that he must have been in charge as the head of Sringeri from at least 1374/75 - as the successor to Bharatitirtha who died in 1374 - until 1386, the year of his own death."

According to Clark, "The first genuine epigraphic mention of Vidyaranya is dated October 25, 1375."

=== Identification with Madhava ===
Vidyaranya, who is thought to have been named Madhava before taking ordination as a sannyasin, is usually identified with Madhavacharya, the author of the Sarvadarśanasaṅgraha and the Shankara Digvijaya.

According to the Sringeri accounts, Vidyaranya was the elder brother of Bharati Tirtha, who preceded him as the acharya of Sringeri. Vidyaranya composed, or contributed to, a number of texts. The Panchadashi may have been finished by Bharati Tirtha, and some sources argue that Vidyaranya and Bharati Tirtha were the same person. Yet the Sringeri records clearly identify them as two different persons.

Some accounts identify Madhavacharya or Vidyaranya with Madhava, the brother of Sayana, a Mimamsa scholar. In his attempt to clarify the identification of Madhava with Vidyaranya, Narasimhachar (1916, 1917) named this Madhava [B], distinguishing him from Madhava [A], a device also followed by Rama Rao (1930; 1931; 1934), and Kulke (1985). Mid 14th century, Madhava [B] served as a minister in the Vijayanagara Empire, and wrote several works, including, according to Rama Rao, the Jivanmuktiviveka, a work usually attributed to Vidyaranya, due to his identification with Madhava [B].

According to the Sringeri account, the brothers Madhava and Sayana came to Vidyaranya to receive his blessings, and completed his unfinished Veda bhashyas.

=== Role in the Vijayanagara Empire ===
The role of Vidyaranya in the founding of the Vijayanagara Empire is not certain. According to tradition, Vidyaranya played an important role in the establishment of the Hindu Vijayanagara Empire (1336–1646) of South India, which emerged as a culmination of attempts by the southern powers to ward off Islamic invasions by the end of the 13th century, as a successor to the Hindu kingdoms of the Hoysalas, the Kakatiyas, and the Yadavas. According to tradition, Vidyaranya supported and inspired the empire's founders Harihara Raya I and Bukka Raya I to fight the Muslim invasion of South India, and served as a prime minister to Harihara Raya I, the first king of the Vijayanagara Empire and named after Harihara, the fused sattvika characterisation of Vishnu (Hari) and Shiva (Hara), and then to Bukka Raya I and Harihara II.

There are several versions of Vidyaranya's role in the Vijayanagara Empire. The Andraha or Telugu version depends on Sanskrit sources written 200 years later, and is often repeated in historical works, such as Nilakanta Sastri's A History of South India. According to this narrative, the empire's founders Harihara Raya I and Bukka Raya I were two brothers belonging to the Kakatiya dynasty, serving the Kampili chief. After Kampili fell to the Muslim invasion, they were taken to Delhi and converted to Islam. They were sent back to Kampili as the Delhi Sultan's vassals. After gaining power in the region, they met Vidyaranya, who converted them back to the Hindu faith. After receiving his blessings, they founded their kingdom at ca. 1336.

An alternate Kannada narrative is that Harihara and Bukka were serving the Hoysalas. According to Robert Goodling, the date of 1336 for the founding of the Vijayanagara Empire is unreliable, based on copperplate inscriptions from the 16th century, forged by Sringeri math "when the Vijayanagara kings shifted their interest from the Saivite matha to the Vaisnavite sect, and the leaders of the matha wanted to reassert their prestige by connecting themselves directly with the founding of the empire." In this view, 1346 is more likely, based on an inscription mentioning the manotsava, or great festival, of Harihara and Bukka, held at Sringeri matha. No mention is made here of a role of Vidyaranya.

The historical authenticity of the Andraha or Telugu account has been questioned. The contemporary documents, including the inscriptions issued by the earliest rulers of Vijayanagara, do not mention this account. The contemporary Muslim records refer to Harihara (as "Harip" or "Haryab"), but do not mention anything about his conversion to Islam, although they contain details of other converts from Deccan. The first works to mention this narrative were written over 200 years after the establishment of Vijayanagara.

According to studies by Filliozat, Kulke and Wagoner, Vidyaranya was not involved in the founding of the Vijayanagara Empire. Texts describing such an involvement date from the 16th and 17th century, and the involvement of Vidyaranya is a "political foundation myth, an ideological attempt to represent the authority of the Vijayanagara state as deriving directly from that of the Sultanate." Vidyaranya's role as an advisor to Harihara Raya I and Bukka Raya I "was imagined probably at least 200 years afterward." His supposed political status may be based on a misidentification with Madhavamatrin, a minister to Sangama brother Mallapa I. Vidyaranya is not mentioned in inscriptions from before 1374.

=== Importance of Sringeri math and influence on Advaita tradition ===
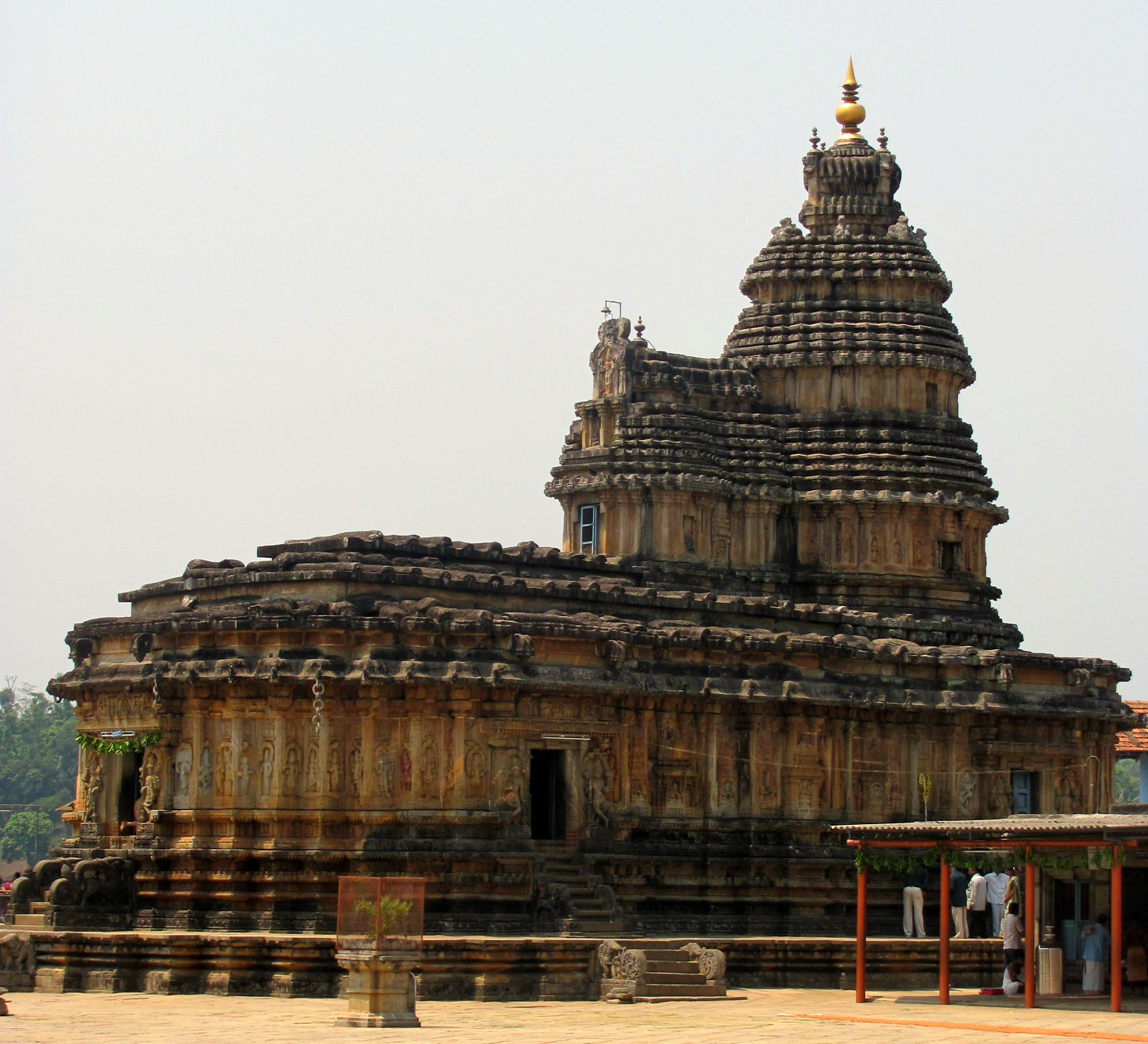
Vidya Sankara temple built by Harihara I on the Samadhi of his guru Vidya sankara.

Sringeri matha became a powerful institution in the 14th century, when it started to receive patronage from the kings of the Vijayanagara Empire. The Vidyashankara temple in Sringeri is the samadhi of Vidya Shankara, Guru of Vidyaranya, which was built over his grave by his disciple Harihara.

Paul Hacker notes that no mention of the mathas can be found before the 14th century CE. Until the 15th century, the timespan of the directors of Sringeri Math are unrealistically long, spanning 60+ and even 105 years. After 1386, the timespans become much shorter. According to Hacker, these mathas may have originated as late as the 14th century, to propagate Shankara's view of Advaita.

Goodding concurs with Hacker on the prominence of Sringeri matha in the Vijayanagara Empire, but argues that Sringeri matha already existed, but rapidly gained prominence in the second half of the 14th century. The key event according to the Kannada narrative is the manotsava of 1346, which marks the beginning of Vijayanagara patronage of Vidyatirtha, the Shankaracarya of Sringeri math, who legitimized their kingdom with his blessings, receiving a land grant in return. According to this narrative, the Sangamas were retainers to the Hoysala royal house, and the 1346 manotsava "marks the inheritance of the Hoysala domains by the new Sangama dynasty." Until 1374, the earliest possible date of Vidyaranya's installment as jagadguru, Sringeri math was granted substantially more land and money, and the prestige of the jagadguru had subsequently changed too. This may have aided the further dissemination of Advaita views, and the production of Advaita texts.

Vidyaranya had a central role in repositioning Shankara and his view on Advaita Vedanta. Vidyaranya enjoyed royal support, and his sponsorship and methodical efforts helped establish Shankara as a rallying symbol of values, spread historical and cultural influence of Shankara's Vedānta philosophies, and establish monasteries (mathas) to expand the cultural influence of Shankara and Advaita Vedānta.

Advaita Vedanta's position as most influential Hindu darsana took shape as Advaitins in the Vijayanagara Empire competed for patronage from the royal court, and tried to convert others to their sect. Vidyaranya's works have been explained as a response to the devastation caused by the Islamic Delhi Sultanate, but his efforts were also targeted at Srivaisnava groups, especially Visistadvaita, which was dominant in territories conquered by the Vijayanagara Empire. Sects competed for patronage from the royal court, and tried to convert others to their own sectarian system, and Vidyaranya efforts were aimed at promoting Advaita Vedanta among Srivaishnavins.

This promotion was aided by the production of new texts. Vidyaranya and his brothers wrote extensive Advaitic commentaries on the Vedas and Dharma to make "the authoritative literature of the Aryan religion" more accessible. In his doxography Sarvadarśanasaṅgraha ("Summary of all views") Madhava presented Shankara's teachings as the summit of all darsanas, presenting the other darsanas as partial truths which converged in Shankara's teachings, which was regarded to be the most inclusive system. The Vaishanava traditions of Dvaita and Visitadvaita were placed just above Buddhism and Jainism, reflecting the threat they posed for Vidyaranya's Advaita allegiance. Bhedabheda wasn't mentioned at all, "literally written out of the history of Indian philosophy."

In the late 15th century, the patronage of the Vijayanagara kings shifted to Vaisnavism. Following this loss of patronage, Sringeri matha had to find other means to propagate its former status, and the story of Shankara establishing the four cardinal mathas may have originated in the 16th century. Most of Shankara's biographies were created and published from the 15th to the 17th century, such as the widely cited Śankara-digvijaya, in which legends were created turning Shankara into a "divine folk-hero who spread his teaching through his digvijaya ("universal conquest") all over India like a victorious conqueror."

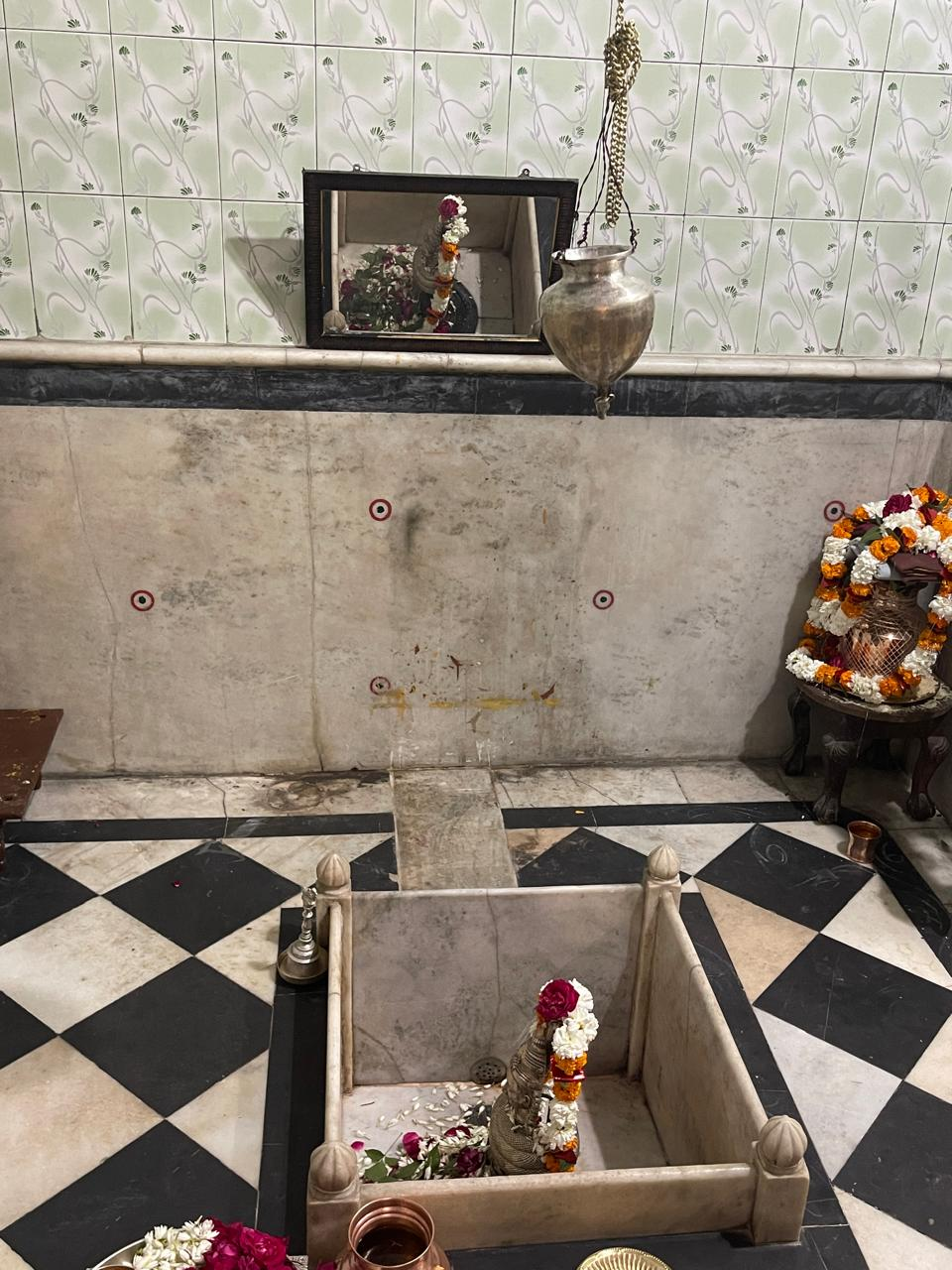
Shiva linga installed by Vidyaranya at Kashi

Vidyaranya is also said to have visited Varanasi and installed a Shiva Linga there which can still be found inside the premises of the Sringeri mutt at Varanasi.

== Works ==
=== Madhavacharya ===
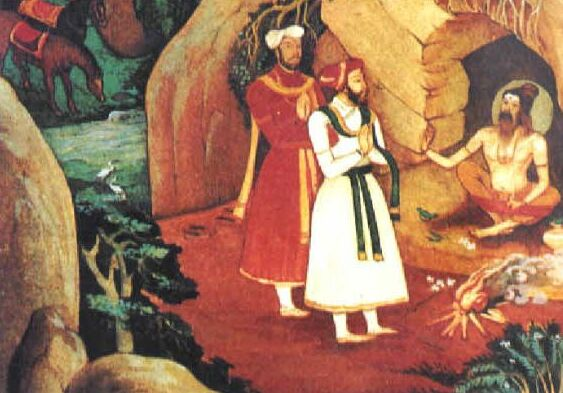
Harihara and Bukka meeting Vidyaranya

The most famous works written by, or attributed to Madhavacharya, are Sarva-darsana-sangraha ("Compendium of Speculations - a compendium of all the known Indian schools of philosophy"), written in Old Kannada; Madhaviya Shankara Vijaya, a hagiography of Shankara; and the Parasara–Madhaviya, written in Sanskrit. While best known for his Advaitic works, Vidyaranya also wrote on dharmasastric legal texts, ritual performance and Purvamimamsa, and does not seem to have perceived Mimamsa and Vedanta as being opposite to each other.

==== Sarvadarśanasaṅgraha ====
While usually attributed to Madhava [B], and thereby to Vidyaranya, Madhava [B] was probably not the author of the Sarvadarśanasaṅgraha. According to Clark, the author may have been Cannibhatta (Cinna or Cennu):

...a most insightful analysis by Thakur (1961) indicates that the author of the SDS was Cannibhatta (Cinna or Cennu), son of Sahajasarvajña Visnu Bhattopadhyaya, who was also a preceptor to Sāyaṇa and Mādhava [B]. Cannibhatta was a younger contemporary of Sāyaṇa and Madhava, author of a sub-commentary on the Pañcapadikavivarana, and worked in the Vijayanagara court under the patronage of Harihara Maharaja. The SDS shares many passages and quotations from Cannibhatta's other works. Thakur suggests that the plan of the work may have originated with Madhava, and been written by Cannibhatta, with the help of Sāyaṇa and Madhava.

According to Sarvepalli Radhakrishnan, the Sarvadarśanasaṅgraha "sketches sixteen systems of thought so as to exhibit a gradually ascending series, culminating in the Advaita Vedanta (or non-dualism)." The sixteen systems of philosophy expounded by him are:

1. Cārvāka
2. Buddhism
3. Arhata or Jainism
4. Ramanuja System or Sri Vaishnavism
5. Purna-Prajña Darsana or Tatva-vaada or Dvaita Vedanta
6. Nakulisa-Paśupata
7. Shaivism
8. Pratyabhijña (Kashmir Shaivism) or Recognitive System
9. Raseśvara or Mercurial System
10. Vaisheshika or Aulukya
11. Akshapada or Nyaya
12. Jaimini
13. Pāṇiniya
14. Samkhya
15. Patanjala or Yoga
16. Vedanta or Adi Shankara

The Sarvadarśanasaṅgraha itself omits the 16th chapter (Advaita Vedanta, or the system of Adi Shankara), the absence of which is explained by a paragraph at the end of the 15th chapter (the Patanjali-Darsana). It says: "The system of Shankara, which comes next in succession, and which is the crest-gem of all systems, has been explained by us elsewhere, it is, therefore, left untouched here."

Madhvacharya sets out to refute, chapter by chapter, the other systems of thought prominent in his day. Vidyaranya depicts and quotes directly from the works of their founders or leading exponents, picturing himself (with mental detachment) as an adherent of each of the sixteen distinct philosophical systems.

Sarvadarśanasaṅgraha is one of the few available sources of information about lokayata, the materialist system of philosophy in ancient India. In the very first chapter, "The Cārvāka System", he critiques the arguments of lokayatikas. While doing so he quotes extensively from Cārvāka works. It is possible that some of these arguments put forward as the lokayata point of view may be a mere caricature of lokayata philosophy. Yet in the absence of any original work of lokayatikas, it is one of the very few sources of information available today on materialist philosophy in ancient India.

==== Madhaviya Shankara (Dig)vijayam ====
The Madhaviya Shankara (Dig)vijayam, also known as Samkshepa-Shankara-Vijaya, a hagiography about the life and achievements of Shankara Bhagavat-Pada (Adi Shankara), is usually attributed to Madhava-Vidyaranya, and dated to the 14th century. The attribution and dating is disputed; the author was a Madhava, and a date of the 17th or even 18th century has also been proposed, (Note: Isayeva refers to W.R. Antarkar (1972), Sanksepa Sankara Jaya of Madhavacarya or Sankara Digvijaya of Sri Vidyaranyamuni. Goodding refers to Jonathan Bader (2000), Conquest of the four quarters: traditional accounts of the life of Śaṅkara, p.55-56, n.75) but this dating has been criticised by scholars, as Antarkar's views seem to side with the specific view of the Kanchi mata. According to Isayeva, following Antarkar, the work contains almost no new material at all and mostly follows the earlier sources. The book is the best-known of the popular hagiographic accounts of Shankara's 'conquests of the four quarters', his tour of India starting from Sringeri, defeating rival teachers and traditions, and establishing four mathas in India to spread the superior teaching of Advaita Vedanta. According to Slaje, the text is a "forgery", according to a central role to Sringeri and the Vijayanagara Empire in spreading Shankara's Advaita Vedanta, and "provid[ing] a further legitimation to Vijayanagara's claim to be the centre of the new orthodoxy." (Note: Kulke (1985), Maharajas, mahants and historians, p.136, quoted in Slaje 1998, p. 116)

==== Other works ====
- The Parasara–Madhaviya is a commentary on the Parasarasmriti.
- The Jayminiyanyayamalavistara is a treatise on the fundamentals of Purvamimamsa.
- Commentary on Sri Vishnu Sahasranama

=== Vidyaranya ===
==== Pañcadaśī ====
Vidyaranya's Pañcadaśī is a standard text on the philosophy of the Advaita Vedanta tradition. It consists of fifteen chapters which are divided into three sections of five chapters each, which are designated as Viveka (Discrimination), Deepa (Illumination), and Ananda (Bliss). The text elucidates many Vedantic concepts, such as the five sheaths of individuality; the relation between Isvara (God), Jagat (world), and Jiva (individual); the indistinguishability of cause and effect; etc.

==== Jivanmuktiviveka ====
The Jivanmuktiviveka was composed ca. 1380, after Madhava had become a sannyasin. While positioning himself as an Advaita Vedantin, Vidyaranya departs from Shankara's insistence on Brahma-jnana as the sole and sufficient means for attaining moksha. In contrast to Shankara, Vidyaranya's "yogic Advaita" work Jivanmuktiviveka added yogic disciplines derived from the Bhagavad Gita, Patanjali's Yoga Sutras, Gaudapada's Karika, and the Laghu-Yoga-Vasistha, which in turn was influenced by Kashmir Shaivism.

==== Mimamsa Sutras ====
Vidyaranya also wrote a commentary on the Mimamsa Sutras.

==== Durvasana Pratikara Dashakam ====
He wrote a set of 10 slokas on removal of evil propensities in human mind.

== See also ==
- Sringeri Sharada Peetham
- Advaita Vedanta
- Vijayanagara Empire
- Kakatiya Empire

== Sources ==
Printed sources

- Blake Michael, R. (1992), The Origins of Vīraśaiva Sects: A Typological Analysis of Ritual and Associational Patterns in the Śūnyasaṃpādane, Motilal Banarsidass, ISBN 978-81-208-0776-1
- Chattopadhyaya, Debiprasad (1993), Indian Philosophy - a Popular Introduction 7th edition, New Delhi: People's Publishing House
- Chopra, P. N.; Ravindran, T. K.; Subrahmanian, N. (2003). "Medieval Period". History of South India. New Delhi: Rajendra Ravindra Printers. ISBN 81-219-0153-7.
- Clark, Matthew (2006), The Daśanāmī-saṃnyāsīs. The Integration of Ascetic Lineages Into an Order, Brill Publishers
- Cowell, E.B.; Gough, A. E. (1882). Sarva-Darsana Sangraha of Madhava Acharya: Review of Different Systems of Hindu Philosophy. New Delhi: Indian Books Centre/Sri Satguru Publications. ISBN 81-703-0875-5.
- Dalal, Roshen (2010). Hinduism: An Alphabetical Guide. Penguin. ISBN 978-0-14-341421-6.
- Fort, Andrew (1996), "Liberation While Living in the Jivanmuktiviveka: Vidrayana's "Yogic Advaita", in Fort, Andrew O.; Mumme, Patricia Y. (eds.), Living Liberation in Hindu Thought, SUNY
- Fort, Andrew (1998), Jivanmukti in Transformation: Embodied Liberation in Advaita and Neo-Vedanta, State University of New York Press, ISBN 978-0791439043
- Fort, Andrew O. (August 1999), "On Destroying the Mind: the Yogasutras in Vidraranya's Jivanmuktiviveka", Journal of Indian Philosophy, 27 (4): 377–395, doi:10.1023/A:1004315406891, S2CID 169073774
- Gilmartin, David; Lawrence, Bruce B. (2000). Beyond Turk and Hindu: Rethinking Religious Identities in Islamicate South Asia. University Press of Florida. ISBN 978-0-8130-3099-9.
- Goodding, Robert A. (2013), "A Theologian in a South Indian Kingdom: The Historical Context of the Jivanmuktiviveka of Vidyaranya", in Lindquist, Steven E. (ed.), Religion and Identity in South Asia and Beyond: Essays in Honor of Patrick Olivelle, Anthem Press
- Hacker, Paul (1995), Philology and Confrontation: Paul Hacker on Traditional and Modern Vedanta, SUNY Press, ISBN 978-0-7914-2582-4
- Isayeva, Natalia (1993). Shankara and Indian Philosophy. Albany: State University of New York Press (SUNY). ISBN 0-7914-1282-2.
- Jackson, William J. (2016), Vijayanagara Voices: Exploring South Indian History and Hindu Literature, Routledge
- Kamath, Suryanath U. (2001) [1980]. A concise history of Karnataka: from pre-historic times to the present. Bangalore: Jupiter books. LCCN 80905179. OCLC 7796041.
- Krishnananda, (Swami). The Philosophy of the Panchadasi. Rishikesh: The Divine Life Society Sivananda Ashram.
- Kulke, Hermann; Rothermund, Dietmar (1998), A History of India, Routledge
- Madaio, James (24 May 2017). "Rethinking Neo-Vedānta: Swami Vivekananda and the Selective Historiography of Advaita Vedānta1". Religions. 8 (6): 101. doi:10.3390/rel8060101.
- Modak, B. R. (1995), Sayana, Sahitya Akademi, p. 6, ISBN 978-81-7201-940-2
- Nicholson, Andrew J. (2010), Unifying Hinduism: Philosophy and Identity in Indian Intellectual History, Columbia University Press
- Nilakanta Sastri, K. A. (1955) [reissued 2002]. A history of South India from prehistoric times to the fall of Vijayanagar. New Delhi: Indian Branch, Oxford University Press. ISBN 978-0-19-560686-7.
- Radhakrishnan, S (1929). Indian Philosophy, Volume 1. Muirhead library of philosophy (2nd ed.). London: George Allen and Unwin Ltd.
- Slaje, Walter (April 1998), "On Changing Others' Ideas: The Case of Vidraranya and the Yogavasishta", Indo-Iranian Journal, 41 (2): 103–124, doi:10.1163/000000098124992448, S2CID 162189856
- Stoker, Valerie (2016), Polemics and Patronage in the City of Victory: Vyasatirtha, Hindu Sectarianism, and the Sixteenth-Century Vijayanagara Court, University of California Press
- Talbot, Cynthia (2001), Precolonial India in Practice: Society, Region, and Identity in Medieval Andhra, Oxford University Press, ISBN 978-0-19-513661-6
- Wagoner, Phillip B (2000). David Gilmartin and Bruce B. Lawrence (ed.). Beyond Turk and Hindu: Rethinking Religious Identities in Islamicate South Asia. University Press of Florida. pp. 300–301. ISBN 978-0-8130-3099-9.

Web-sources

Preceded by Sri Bharati Krishna Tirtha	Jagadguru of Sringeri Sharada Peetham; 1380–1386	Succeeded by Sri Chandrasekhara Bharati I
