= Vamana =

Dwarf avatar of Vishnu

- Member of Dashavatara
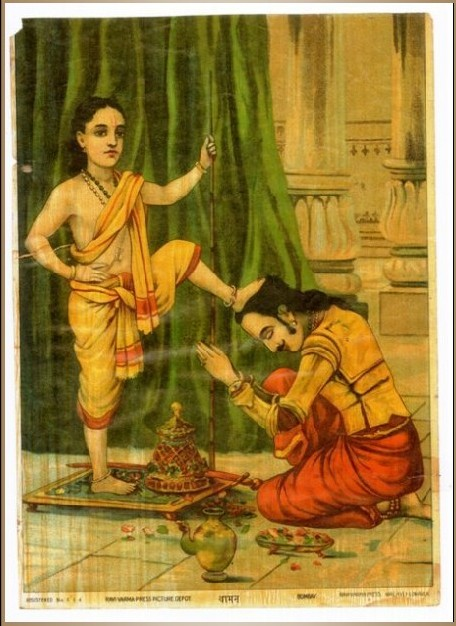
- Vamana Avatar by Raja Ravi Varma
- Affiliation: Vaishnavism
- Abode: Vaikuntha, Satala
- Mantra: Om Trivikramaya vidmahe Vishvarupaya cha dhimahi Tanno Vamana prachodayat
- Symbol: Kamandalu and umbrella
- Festivals: Onam, Balipratipada, Vamana Dvadashi

Genealogy
- Parents: Kashyapa (father); Aditi (mother)
- Siblings: Indra and the Adityas
- Consort: Kirti
- Children: Brhatsloka ('Great Praise')

Dashavatara Sequence
- Predecessor: Narasimha
- Successor: Parashurama

Vamana (Sanskrit: वामन, lit. 'Dwarf', IAST: Vāmana), also known as Trivikrama (lit. 'three steps'), Urukrama (lit. 'far-stepping'), Upendra (lit. 'Indra’s younger brother/Superior to Indra'), Dadhivamana (Sanskrit: दधिवामन, lit. 'milk-dwarf', IAST: Dadhivāmana), Ulagalanthan (lit. 'the one who measured the world) and Balibandhana (lit. 'binder or killer of Bali'), is an avatar of the Hindu deity Vishnu. He is the fifth avatar of Vishnu and the first Dashavatara in the Treta Yuga, after Narasimha.

First mentioned in the Vedas, Vamana is most commonly associated in the Hindu epics and Puranas with the story of taking back the three worlds (collectively referred to as the Trailokya) from the daitya-king Mahabali by taking three steps to restore the cosmic order and push Mahabali into the netherworld. He is the youngest among the adityas, the sons of Aditi and the sage Kashyapa.

== Nomenclature and etymology ==
'Vāmana' (Sanskrit वामन) means 'dwarf', 'small' or 'small or short in stature'. It also means 'dwarfish bull', which is notable as Vishnu is directly associated with dwarfish animals (including bulls) in the Vedas (see below). Stated in Puranic literature to be born of the great sage Kashyapa and his wife Aditi, other names or epithets referring to Vamana include:

Name	Sanskrit	Meaning / Description
'Balibandhana' or 'Balibandhanakrt'	बलिबन्धन	'binder or killer of Bali'; stated in the Garuda Purana to mean 'who fettered the demon Bali' (see below).
'Dadhi-vamana'	दधिवामन	'bestowing', 'giving', 'curd' / 'curdled milk' (regarded as a remedy), and 'resin of Shala tree' (apparently sacred and favoured by Vishnu; used for incense, in Ayurvedic medicine, to build dwellings, and to caulk boats).
'Trivikrama'	त्रिविक्रम	'three steps' or 'three strides' (tri 'three' + vikrama 'step' or 'stride'). This epithet refers to the three steps or strides of Vishnu in the Rigveda.
'Urukrama'	उरुक्रम	'far stepping' or 'wide stride', presumably in relation to covering all existence with the second step (e.g. Skanda Purana 1.19.42).
'Upendra'	उपेन्द्र	'younger brother of Indra/superior to Indra' or simply 'a son'. This epithet refers to the birth of the Dwarf Avatar as one of the 12 adityas - sons - of Aditi and the sage Kashyapa (i.e. along with Indra).
'Vāmanadeva'	वामनदेव	'dwarf-god' (vamana 'dwarf' + deva 'god').

== Legend ==
After Indra (the king of the devas and the son of Kashyapa and Aditi) was defeated by the daitya called Bali, the king of the asuras, the great-great grandson of Kashyapa and Diti, the devas ultimately seek refuge in Vishnu, who agrees to restore Indra to power. To do so, Vishnu incarnates as Vamana (the son of Kashyapa and Aditi )

Mahabali decided to perform a grand Ashwamedha Yagna (horse sacrifice ritual) at a place called Bhrigukachaka on the northern bank of the Narmada River.

Vamana arrived there, and asked for three feet (steps) of land (usually to build a fire-altar). Bali agreed, despite being warned about Vamana's true nature as Vishnu (usually by his preceptor, the sage Shukra, the son of Bhrigu).

Vamana grew as Trivikrama. With one foot, he measured the entire Earth and the underworld, Patala. With the other foot, he measured the sky and the heavens.

He looked at King Bali and asked where should the third step land. Determined to keep his word, King Bali told Vamana to place the third step on his head. Upon hearing this, Lord Vishnu appeared in his true form and blessed King Bali and allowed him to rule the underworld. So Bali went to Patala, the netherworld. Due to the Vamana incarnation of Lord Vishnu, Indra and other gods retained Amaravati.

== Symbolism ==
Positions of the Sun during the day

A. A. Macdonell states that the 'reason why Visnu took his three steps is a secondary trait. He thrice traversed the earthly spaces for man in distress (6, 49); he traversed the earth to bestow it on man for a dwelling (7, 100); he traversed the earthly spaces for wide-stepping existence (1, 155); with Indra he took vast strides and stretched out the worlds for our existence (6, 69). This feature in the [Rigveda] may ultimately be traced to the myth of Vishnu's dwarf incarnation which appears in the epics and Puranas. The intermediate stage is found in the Brahmanas ([Shatapatha Brahmana] 1, 2, 5; [Taittiriya Samhita] 2, 1, 3; [Taittiriya Brahmana] 1, 6, 1), where Vishnu takes the form of a dwarf, to reclaim the earth for the devas by means of sacrifice.The three points in sun's course: Roy states that 'Vishnu's three strides alluded to in the Rigveda have been variously interpreted as symbolizing the three different positions of the sun at its rising, peak and setting.

The three worlds and the three planes: J. Muir mentions Sayanas take on the three steps of Vishnu found the White Yajurveda (5.15). 'Vishnu, becoming incarnate as Trivikrama (the god who stepped thrice), strode over the whole universe. The same idea is expressed by the Rishis, "In three places he planted his step, (one step on the earth, a second in the atmosphere, and a third in the sky) as Agni, Vayu, and Surya each after the other". Agni (Fire) is found on the ground, Vayu (Air) prevades the atmosphere and Surya(Sun) high in the dome of sky, thus the three steps symbolise the three planes, the ground below, air in between, and the sky above.

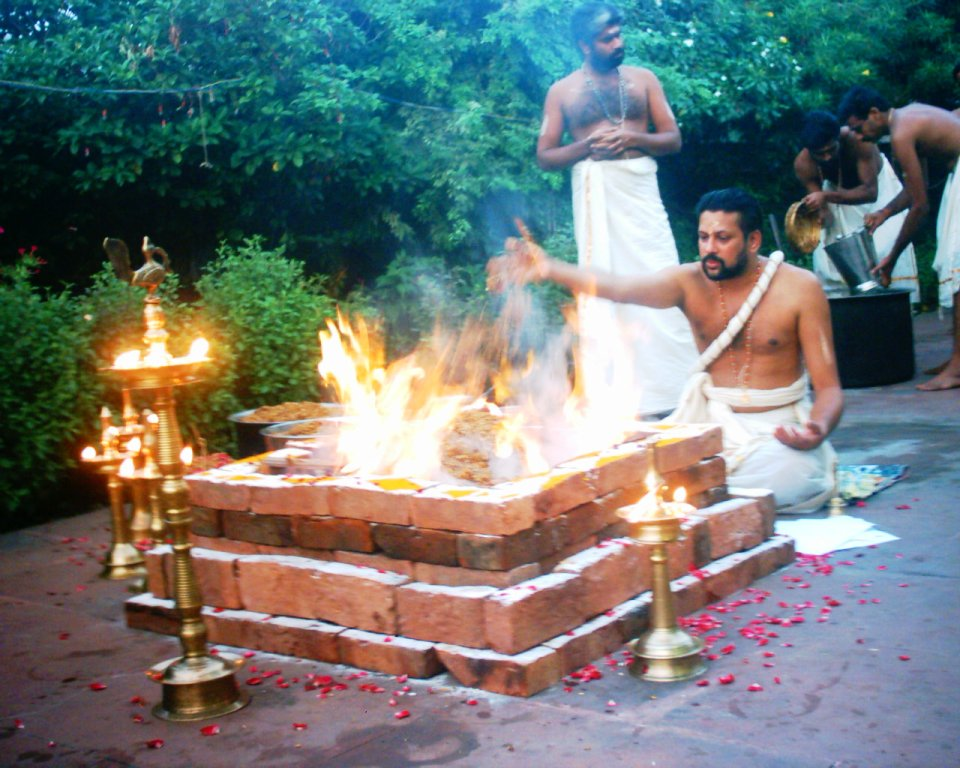
A yajna

Three states of sleep and wakefulness: S. Chanda states the three strides symbolize the three states of existence – Jagrat (Awake), Swapna (Dream Sleep) and sushupti (Deep Sleep). The final step of Vamana is on the head of Bali which symbolizes Liberation and the transcendence of these states.

=== Nirukta ===
Written by the grammarian Yaska, Nirukta is one of the six Vedangas or 'limbs of the Vedas', concerned with correct etymology and interpretation of the Vedas. The entry for Vishnu (relating to the Rigveda) states (square brackets '[ ]' are as per the original author):

Vishnu strode over this (Universe). Thrice he planted his foot, enveloped in dust.

Vishnu strides over this and all that exists. Thrice he plants his foot, [for threefold existence].'On earth, in the intermediate space, and in heaven, says Sakapuni. 'On the mountain of sunrise, on the meridian, and on the mountain of sunset' says Aurnavabha.

Enveloped in his [dust], i. e. the footprint is not visible in the stormy atmosphere. Or it is used in a metaphorical sense, i.e. his footstep is not visible, as if enveloped in a dusty place. Pdmsavah (Dust) is (so called) because it is produced (√su) by feet (pddaih) or else it lies scattered on the ground, or it is trodden down.

— The Nighantu and the Nirukta, translated by Lakshman Sarup (1967), Chapter 12, Section 19

This account essentially states that the three footsteps may symbolise the positions of the sun or physical existence conceptualised as 'three worlds'. In regard to the references to Sakapuni and Aurnavabha, K. S. Murty states that 'Yaska was not the first to interpret Vedic words as he did. He referred to a Nighantu with Samamnaya which he cited and explained. He had predecessors like Sakapuru, Audumbarayana, Aupamanyava and others'.

== Vedas ==
=== Rigveda ===
Rig	References		Notes
Rig	Samhita (Mandala Krama)	Vishnu (steps): 1.22, 1.154, 6.69, 7.99, 7.100; Bali (tribute): 5.1.10, 7.6.5; Brhaspati / Vrihaspati: 4.50	
Rig	Aitareya Brahmana	Vishnu: 1.1.3, 3.2.18, 3.3.32, 6.3.15; Bali (tribute): 7.5.29	

==== Samhita ====
ato devā avantu no yato viṣṇurvicakrame |
pṛthivyāḥ saptadhāmabhiḥ ||

idaṃ viṣṇurvi cakrame tredhā ni dadhe padam |
samūḷhamasya pāṃsure ||

trīṇi padā vi cakrame viṣṇurghopā adābhyaḥ |
ato dharmāṇi dhārayan ||

— RigVeda transliteration of Book 1, Hymn 22, Verses 16-18
Translation:

The Gods be gracious unto us even from the place whence Vishnu strode
Through the seven regions of the earth!

Through all this world strode Vishnu; thrice his foot he planted, and the whole
Was gathered in his footstep's dust.

Vishnu, the Guardian, he whom none deceiveth, made three steps; thenceforth
Establishing his high decrees.

— RigVeda translation by Ralph T.H. Griffith (1896) of Book 1, Hymn 22, Verses 16–18

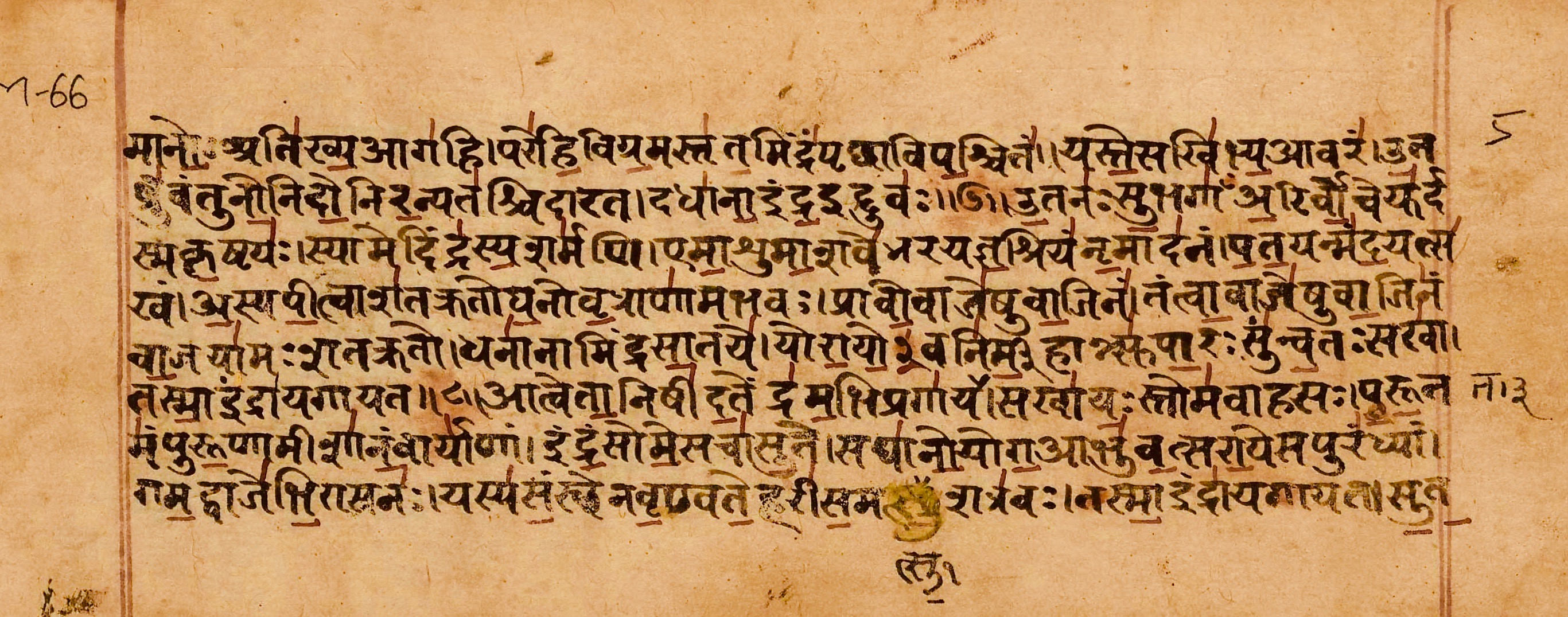
Rigveda page in Sanskrit

Roy states that the Rigvedic passages referring to Vishnu's three strides are obviously the nucleus, out of which the legend of the Dwarf was created. But the Rigveda, however, does not describe Vishnu as dwarf or Vamana'. W. J. Wilkins agrees, stating that in regard to the Vishnu strides of the Rigveda, 'in these verses there is probably the germ of the Dwarf Incarnation'.

In regard to the above-quoted verses, it is commonly accepted that there are Seven Continents or 'regions of the earth'. A. Glucklich adds that 'In the Matsya Purana, for instance, there is a seven-part map of the world ... [it has] one centre, where an immense mountain – Mount Meru (or Maha Meru, Great Meru) – stands ... The continents encircle the mountain in seven concentric circles ... It seems clear that the Himalayas were the approximate location of Mt. Meru'.

In regard to the three steps of Vishnu, Glucklich points out that in some legends of Vamana and the Asura-King Bali, that 'the first [Step] covered the entire earth, the second covered the atmosphere, and the third measured heaven in its entirety'. M. Haug, in his translation of the Aitareya Brahmana (1.1.5) of the Rigveda, clarifies that the 'three worlds' often means the Ground (Earth), the Air (Atmosphere), and the Sky (Heavens). Three steps thus encompasses all of physical existence (although in some Puranic accounts Vamana does so in only two steps). D. Goodall also relates more a mystical interpretation of what 'three worlds' symbolises, as provided by the Brihadaranyaka Upanishad, including Mind, Speech, and Breath (see Upanishad section, below).

Notably, Muir also states that although 'Adabhya' can be translated as 'who cannot be deceived' (as provided by Griffiths, above), it can also be translated as 'the unconquerable preserver', and notes that the 'idea of Vishnu being preeminently the preserver of the universe, which became current in later times [i.e. in the Trimurti], may possibly have been derived from this verse'.

==== Aitareya Brahmana ====
In the words indras cha Visno yad apaspridhetham [RV 6.69.8] (there is hinted) that Indra and Vishnu fought with the Asuras. After they had defeated them, they said to them, "Let us divide!" The Asuras accepted the offer. Indra then said, "All through which Vishnu makes his three steps is ours, the other part is yours." Then Indra stepped through these (three worlds), then over the Vedas, and (lastly) over Vach.

— The Aitareya Brahmana, translated by Martin Haug (1922), Book 6, Chapter 3, Section 15 (pp. 275)

The concept of Vishnu obtaining the three worlds for the Devas from the Asuras in three steps is clearly explained in the Aitareya Brahmana. The Rigveda Samhita verse referred to (6.69.8) regarding Indra and Vishnu battling the Asuras states 'Ye Twain have conquered, ne’er have ye been conquered: never hath either of the Twain been vanquished. Ye, Indra-Vishnu, when ye fought the battle, produced this infinite with three divisions'.

Should the Hotar [Vedic Priest] repeat that verse (tan vo maho), he would prevent the rain from coming, for Parjanya has power over the rain (but there is no allusion to him in that verse). But if he repeat the verse pinvanty apo, where there is a pada referring to rain (the third atyam na mihe), and one referring to the Marutas [188] (the storms accompanying the rain, in the first pada), and the word viniyanti, "they carry off," which refers to Vishnu, whose characteristic feature is said to be vichakrame, i.e., he strode (thrice through the universe), which meaning is (also) implied in the term vinayanti, and (where is further in it) the word, vajie, "being laden with booty," referring to Indra (then the rain would come).

— The Aitareya Brahmana, translated by Martin Haug (1922), Book 3, Chapter 3, Section 18 ('On the Origin of the Dhayyas, their Nature and Meaning', pp. 126–127)

The Maruts, referred to as 'the sons of Rudra' are frequently mentioned throughout the Rigveda, including in relation to the above quotation, producing rain (1.38.7). Indra is the god of rain and as stated in the Aitareya Brahmana, 'rain gives food' (2.5.41; pp. 106). This is elaborated upon in the Aitareya Aranyaka (Aranyaka 2, Adhyaya 3) which states "the seed of the devas is rain. The seed of rain is herbs. The seed of herbs is food". Additionally, in the Bhagavad Gita, Krishna states 'All living bodies subsist on food grains, which are produced from rains. Rains are produced by performance of yajna' (3.14).

=== Sama Veda ===
Sama	References		Notes
Sama	Samhita	Part 1: Book III, Chapter I, Decade II (3.1.2.9); Part 2: Book VIII, Chapter II, Decade V (8.2.5)	From Rigveda 1.22
Sama	Pancavimsa Brahmana	Vishnu: XII.13.22, XX.3.2; Bali (tribute): XV.7.4	

==== Samhita ====
Through all this world strode Vishnu: thrice his foot he planted, and the whole
Was gathered in his footstep's dust.

Vishnu, the guardian, he whom none deceiveth, made three steps, thenceforth
Establishing his high decrees.

— Sama Veda, translated by R. T. H. Griffith (1895), Part 2, Book VIII, Chapter II, Decade V, Verses 1-2

The translator, R.T.H. Griffith, states in his introduction to the Sama Veda that it 'is made up of hymns, portions of hymns, and detached verses, taken mainly from the Rigveda'. The above-quoted Sama Veda hymn, for example, is taken directly from Rigveda hymn 1.22.

==== Pancavimsa Brahmana ====
Prajapati created the (domestic) animals (the cattle, the cows). These, being created, left him. Through the agnistoma, he did not reach them, nor through the uktha(-land)s, nor through the sodasin, nor through the night (-rite), nor through the twilight(-laud), nor through the asvina (-sastra). In regard to them, he said to Agni; 'Try thou to reach these for me’. Agni was not able to reach them through (the first extra-laud:) the nine-versed stoma, the jarabodhlya-(-saman)... He said about them to Vishnu: ‘Try thou to reach these for me’. Vishnu reached them, through (the fourth extra laud) the twenty-one-versed stoma, through the varavantiya (-saman), he restrained them (from passing away farther, avarayata): with the verse: ‘Here did Vishnu stride’, he strode.

— Pancavimsa Brahmana, translated by W. Caland (1931), Chapter XX, 3.2

The terms 'stoma' and 'saman' from the above-quoted Pancavimsa Brahmana refer to mantras and hymns, such from the Sama Veda.

The Jaiminīya Brahmana has a similar verse (1.3.3.2; also of the Sama Veda) which omits Vishnu's strides but explains the Varavantiya saman as 'He who desired cattle should apply the Varavantiya Saman. Prajapati created the animals. Having been created they ran away from him. By means of the Varavantiya Saman he held them back. Because he held them back (avarayat) therefore the Varavantiya is called the Varavantiya. The application of the Varavantiya as the agnistoma Saman is made in order that the animals remain present and do not run away'.

In the Taittiriya Samhita 5.5.8 (Black Yajurveda) Varavantiya is also explained as 'Prajapati created Agni; he [Agni], [being] created, went away from him; him [Agni] he [Prajapati] checked (avarayata) by the Varavantiya, and that is why the Varavantiya has its name. By the Cyaita he congealed him, and that is why the Cyaita has its name. In that he reverences, with the Varavantiya, he restrains him, and by the Cyaita he congeals him'.

The strides of Vishnu are thus referred to in regard to restraining animals from running away from sacrifices (often in rituals rice-cakes and other plant or milk-based foods would be symbolically sacrificed while the actual animals they represented would be left unharmed). This idea of being restrained by Vishnu strides may be linked to Bali often being restrained or bound in the legend of Vamana.

=== Yajur Veda ===
Yajur	References			Notes
Yajur	Śukla (White)	Vajasaneyi Samhita	2.25, 5.15, 16.30	2.25 is recited during the 'Vishnu Strides' in the yajna detailed in SB 1.9.3.
Yajur	Śukla (White)	Shatapatha Brahmana	Vishnu: 1.2.5, 1.9.3, 2.3.1.12; Bali (tribute): 1.3.2.15, 1.5.3.18, 1.6.3.17, 11.2.6.14	1.9.3 uses the formula from Vajasaneyi Samhita 2.25.
Yajur	Krishna (Black)	Taittiriya Samhita	VIshnu: Kanda 1: (strides) 2.13.i, 3.4.d, 3.6, 6.5, 7.5, 7.6, 7.7, 8.10, 8.15; (dwarf) 8.1, 8.8, 8.17; Kanda 2: (dwarf) 1.3, 1.5, 1.8; (strides) 4.12, 6.12; Kanda 3: (strides) 2.6, 2.10, 2.11, 5.3; Kanda 4: (strides) 2.1, 2.9; (dwarf) 5.5; Kanda 5: (strides) 2.1, 6.16; Kanda 6: --; Kanda 7: --	'Kanda 1: 2.13.i' means 'Kanda 1, Prapāṭhaka 2, Section 13, verse i'.
Yajur	Krishna (Black)	Taittiriya Samhita	Bali (tribute): Kanda 1: 6.2	'Kanda 1: 2.13.i' means 'Kanda 1, Prapāṭhaka 2, Section 13, verse i'.
Yajur	Krishna (Black)	Taittiriya Brahmana	VIshnu: Book 1: 1.2.5.1; Book 2: 2.4.3.10; Bali (tax / tribute): Book 2: 2.7.18.3	

==== White Yajurveda: Vajasaneyi Samhita ====
Homage to him with braided hair and to him with shaven
hair, homage! homage to the thousand-eyed and to him
with a hundred bows, homage!
To the mountain-haunter and to Sipivishta, homage!
To the most bountiful, armed with arrows, homage!

Homage to the short, and to the dwarf, homage, homage to
the great and to the adult, homage! Homage to the full-grown
and to the growing, to the foremost and to the first
be homage.

Homage to the swift, and to the active be homage, and to
the hasty and to the rapid mover be homage! Homage to
him who dwells in waves, and in still waters, to him who
dwells in rivers and on islands.

— Vajasaneyi Samhita, translated by Ralph T.H. Griffith (1899), Book 16, Verses 29-31

In regard to the above quotation, Aiyangar states that long (i.e. including braided) hair indicates Munis, and shaven hair indicates 'an ascetic of the order of sannyasin'. Roy argues that in 'the Satarudriya hymn of the Yajurveda [i.e. Vajasaneyi Samhita, Book 16, as quoted above], Rudra is referred to as vamana. Rudra is said to preside over the asterism of Ardra and may, therefore, be understood to denote the star'.

However, the terms 'thousand-eyed' (i.e. Purusha, see second account of Vamana in the Harivamsa, below), 'mountain-haunter' (e.g. Rigveda 1.154, above), and 'Sipivishta' given in the above-quote all also apply to Vishnu. In addition, the Shatapatha Brahmana (attached to the Vajasaneyi Samhita), relates the legend of Vishnu as a Dwarf, not Rudra /Shiva. Regardless, in the Puranas there are legends of both Vishnu and Shiva incarnating as Brahmin-dwarfs, and the above-quoted hymn provides the essential ingredients: the Brahmin, the Dwarf, and the concept of growth.

==== White Yajurveda: Shatapatha Brahmana ====
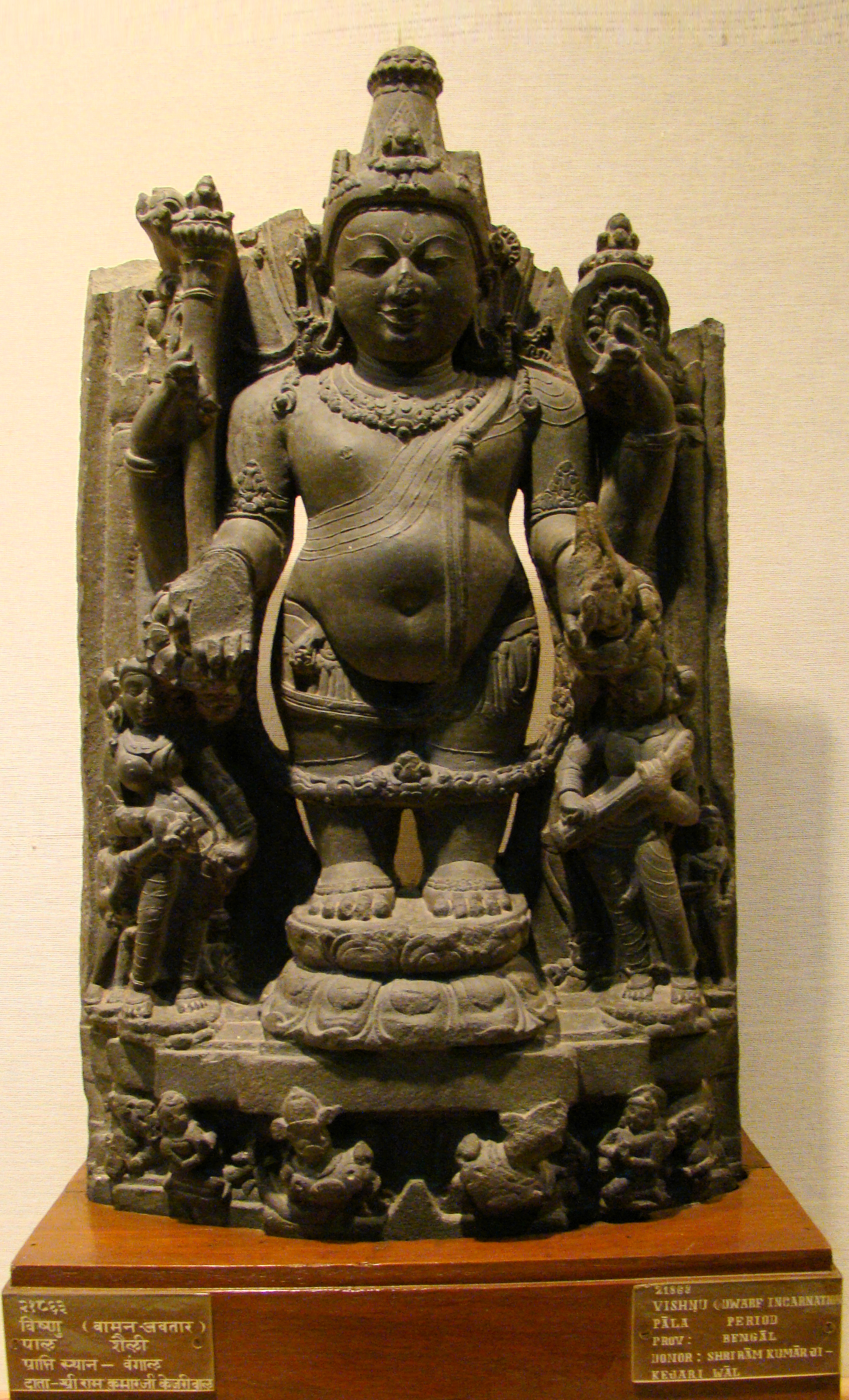
Vishnu dwarf incarnation (Vamana), Pala period, Bengal – BHU Museum

The gods and the Asuras, both of them sprung from Pragâpati, were contending for superiority. Then the gods were worsted, and the Asuras thought: 'To us alone assuredly belongs this world! They thereupon said: 'Well then, let us divide this world between us; and having divided it, let us subsist thereon!' They accordingly set about dividing it with ox-hides from west to east.

The gods then heard of this, and said: 'The Asuras are actually dividing this earth: come, let us go to where the Asuras are dividing it. For what would become of us, if we were to get no share in it?' Placing Vishnu, (in the shape of) this very sacrifice, at their head, they went (to the Asuras). They then said: 'Let us share in this earth along with yourselves! Let a part of it be ours!' The Asuras replied rather grudgingly: 'As much as this Vishnu lies upon, and no more, we give you!'

Now Vishnu was a dwarf. The gods, however, were not offended at this, but said: 'Much indeed they gave us, who gave us what is equal in size to the sacrifice' ... Having thus enclosed him on all (three) sides, and having placed Agni (the fire) on the east side, they went on worshipping and toiling with it (or him, i.e. Vishnu, the sacrifice). By it they obtained (sam-vid) this entire earth...

— Shatapatha Brahmana, translated by Julius Eggeling (1900), Kanda I, Adhyaya 2, Brahmana 5, Verses 1–7

Muir states about this legend in the Shatapatha Brahmana that 'Vishnu is represented as a dwarf, and as having, under the form of sacrifice, conquered the whole earth... [this] contains the germ of the story of the Dwarf [i.e. Vamana] incarnation'. This legend is given in relation to the Darsapûrnamâseshtî, or 'New and Full-moon Sacrifices'. The translator, Eggeling, states (footnote 59:1 of the given link) that the above-quoted legend 'represents the Purva-Parigraha, or first enclosing of the altar by a single line being drawn with the wooden sword [a sacrificial instrument called a satasphyam] on each of the three sides'. He also supposes (while admitting he cannot prove it) that the size of Vishnu may represent 'the sun-light, which, on shrinking to a dwarf's size in the evening, is the only means of preservation left to the devas'.

He now strides the (three) Vishnu-strides. He who sacrifices assuredly gratifies the gods. In gratifying the gods by that sacrifice--partly by riks [verses from the RigVeda], partly by yagus [verses from the YajurVeda], partly by oblations--he acquires a share among them; and having acquired a share among them, he goes to them.

And again why he strides the Vishnu-strides, is; Vishnu, truly, is the sacrifice, by striding (vi-kram) he obtained for the gods that all-pervading power (vikrânti) which now belongs to them. By his first step he gained this same (earth), by the second this aërial expanse, and by his last (step) the sky. And this same pervading power Vishnu, as the sacrifice, obtains by his strides for him (the sacrificer): for this reason he strides the Vishnu-strides. Now it is indeed from this (earth) that most (beings) go (upwards)..

— Shatapatha Brahmana, translated by Julius Eggeling (1900), Kanda I, Adhyaya 9, Brahmana 3, Verses 8-9

This instruction, relating directly to the Vishnu strides mentioned in the Rigveda, is also given in relation to the Darsapūrnamāseshtī, or 'New and Full-moon Sacrifices'. The three strides of Vishnu are not mentioned in direct relation to the legend of Vishnu as a dwarf. Instead, they are mentioned in regard to the performance of sacrifices to consecrate the sacrificial ground (e.g. to drive away the Rakshasas or 'demons' and solidify their own power).

Now when he offers in the evening after sunset, he does so thinking, 'I will offer to the gods of this life-giving juice: we subsist on this which belongs to them.' And when he afterwards takes his evening meal, he eats what remains of the offering, and whereof oblative portions (bali) have been distributed all round; for he who performs the Agnihotra eats only what remains of the offering.

— Shatapatha Brahmana, translated by Julius Eggeling (1900), Kanda 2, Adhyaya 3, Brahmana 1, Verse 12

This quote shows that 'Bali' is used refer to oblative portions or sacrificial offerings in ritual ceremonies such as the Agnihotra. In combination with 'Bali' being used to refer to taxes (see Taittiriya Brahmana, below), it therefore seems possible these meanings are linked with Bali being a king that loved to perform sacrifices and give sacrificial offerings (e.g. such as three steps of land).

==== Black Yajurveda: Taittiriya Samhita ====
The gods and the Asuras strove for these worlds; Visnu saw this dwarf, he offered it to its own deity; then he conquered these worlds. One who is engaged in a struggle should offer a dwarf (beast) to Visnu; then he becomes Visnu and conquers these worlds.

— Taittiriya Samhita, translated by Arthur Berriedale Keith (1914), Kanda 2, Prapathaka 1, Section 3

As per the above quote from the Taittirya Samhita, the sacrificial fee for Vishnu is a dwarf-animal (also stated in 1.8.1 (ox), 1.8.8, and 1.8.17). As D.A. Soifer states, the 'series of connections inherent in all this seems to be as follows: Visnu's three steps regain the worlds - Vishnu as a dwarf takes the three steps - a dwarf animal is sacrificed to Visnu to gain the power of this three steps'.

==== Black Yajurveda: Taittiriya Brahmana ====
Then the King recites the two dvadasha strotras and the two chaturvimsha. Then the Kshatra power manifests in him very well (udbhidyam), then the citizens easily bring their taxes (bali) to the king.

— Taittiriya Brahmana (Volume 2), translated by R.L. Kashyap (2017), Ashtaka 2, Prapathaka 7, Anuvaka 18, Khandika 3 (p.377)

This quote shows that 'Bali' is used refer to taxes paid to the King. It seems possible that this is linked to the character of Bali being a king (of the Asuras) who - also consistent with the other meaning of 'sacrificial offerings or oblations' - loved to perform sacrifices and give sacrificial offerings (such as land requested by dwarf-Brahmins).

=== Atharva Veda ===
Arharva	References		Notes
Arharva	Samhita	Vishnu: 7.26; Bali (tribute): 3.4.3, 11.1.20, 11.4.19	7.26 is from Rigveda 1.54. 11.1.20 uses the word 'bali-hāra'; 11.4.19 uses 'bali-hṛt' to mean 'tribute'.

== Upanishads ==
=== Brihadaranyaka Upanishad ===
These are the three worlds. The organ of speech is this World (The Earth), the mind is the sky, and the vital force is that World (Heaven).
These are the three Vedas. The organ of speech is the RigVeda, the mind is the YajurVeda, and the vital force the SamaVeda.
These are the Gods, the Manes and Men. The organ of speech is the gods, the mind the Manes, and the vital force men.
These are the father, mother and child. The mind is the father, the organ of speech the mother, and the vital force the child.

— Brihadaranyaka Upanishad with commentary of Shankaracharya (translated by Swami Madhavananda, 1934), Section 5, Verses 4-7

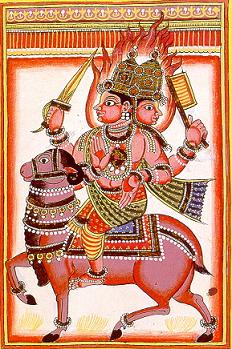
Agni, the god of fire

The Brihadaranyaka Upanishad is one of the Mukhya or Principal 108 Upanishads. From the last book of the Satapatha Brahmana (Kanva recension; this article cites the Madhyandina recension in the section above, which does not contain the Upanishad), it is a treatise on Atman (Soul or Self), and has been commented upon by figures such as Adi Shankar and Madhvacharya.

According to this Sruti scripture, the concept of the 'three worlds' does not just refer to physical reality (i.e. ground, atmosphere, and sky). It also has other - more mystical - meanings, including Speech, Mind, and Vital Force. As such, the legend of Vamana striding over the three worlds in two or three steps also may have more mystical meanings, and those provided by the Brihadaranyaka Upanishad seem to be consistent with established Vedic concepts such as Pancha Bhoota (the Hindu classical elements). For example, it is stated by the above-quoted Upanishad that the first step on the earth also represents the organ of speech ('vac' or 'vak'). According to other authoritative - including Sruti sources - the first step, ground, and speech are all represented by Agni (God of Fire; fire-altars are key components of sacrifices):

- Sayana states that the first step on the earth is represented by Agni (see above).
- The Taittiriya Samhita (Black Yajurveda) 1.7.11 states 'Agni with one syllable won speech' (2.1.4 also explains the symbolic significance of the number three).
- The Shatapatha Brahmana (White Yajurveda) 3.2.2.13 states 'Agni is speech'.

== Itihasa (Epics) ==
=== Mahabharata ===
Mahabharata	References	Notes
Mahabharata	Book 3 - Vana Parva - CII (102), CCLXX (270), CCCXIII (313); Book 6 - Bhishma Parva - LXVII (67); Book 12 - Santi Parva - XLIV (44), CCVII (207), CCCXL (340), CCCL (350); Book 13 - Anusasana Parva - XVII (17), CIX (109), CXXVI (126), CXLIX (149);	
Mahabharata	Translation is by K.M. Ganguli, unless otherwise stated.	

Then that powerful king of wild beasts, Man-Lion [Narasimha], taking a leap in the air, instantly rent the Daitya [Hiranyakashipu] in twain by means of his sharp claws. And the adorable lotus-eyed Lord of great effulgence, having thus slain the Daitya king for the well-being of all creatures, again took his birth in the womb of Aditi as son of Kashyapa. And at the expiration of a thousand years she was delivered of that superhuman conception. And then was born that Being, of the hue of rain-charged clouds with bright eyes and of Dwarfism stature.

He had the Asceticism's staff and water-pot in hand, and was marked with the emblem of a curl of hair on the breast [the shrivatsa mark]. And that adorable Being wore matted locks and the sacrificial thread, and he was stout and handsome and resplendent with lustre. And that Being, arriving at the sacrificial enclosure of Vali, king of the Danavas, entered the sacrificial assembly with the aid of Vrihaspati. And beholding that dwarf-bodied Being, Vali was well-pleased and said unto him, 'I am glad to see thee, O Brahmana! Say what is it that thou wantest from me!' Thus addressed by Vali, the dwarf-god replied with a smile, saying, 'So be it! Do thou, lord of the Danavas, give me three paces of ground!' And Vali contented to give what that Brahmana of infinite power had asked. And while measuring with his paces the space he sought. Hari assumed a wonderful and extraordinary form. And with only three paces he instantly covered this illimitable world. And then that everlasting God, Vishnu, gave it away unto Indra. This history which has just been related to thee, is celebrated as the 'Incarnation of the Dwarf', And from him, all the gods had their being, and after him the world is said to be Vaishnava, or pervaded by Vishnu. And for the destruction of the wicked and the preservation of religion, even He hath taken his birth among men in the race of the Yadus. And the adorable Vishnu is styled Krishna.

— Mahabharata (translated by Kisari Mohan Ganguli, 1883-1896), Book 3, Vana Parva, Chapter CCLXX (270)

The Mahabharata, ascribed to the sage Vyasa, is one of two epic poems (Itihasa) in the Hindu cannon. Most notably, of the 18 the books (parvas) of the Mahabharata, the sixth (called the Bhishma Parva) is the Bhagavad Gita, containing the teachings of Krishna (synonymous with Vishnu / Hari, as evidenced by the Mahabharata itself). The main account of Vamana is quoted above from chapter 270 of the third book, the Vana Parva, in its entirety. All other references cited are either brief mentions of this legend or supplementary information such as blessings that can be obtained in relation to Vamana.

Notably, academics such as J. Melton and C. A. Jones state that 'Onam, an ancient rice harvest festival, is now tied to the story of King Mahabali as recounted in the epic Indian tale, the Mahabharata... Vishnu, impressed with Mahabali's devotion, granted him [Bali] the boon of being able to revisit his former subjects once a year'. However, no references were provided and no such account has been found in the Mahabharata (at least in the translation by K.M. Ganguli). Other notable details include:

- Referring to the Rigveda (i.e. the three steps of Vishnu), it is stated 'He is the great Boar. He is the great Man-Lion, and He is the Three-stepped Lord' (Book 6, Bhishma Parva, LXVII)
- Aditi gave birth to the devas (including Vamana), Diti the Asuras, and Danu the Danavas; all are wives of Kashyapa (Book 12, Santi Parva, CCVII)
- Krishna, while informing the sage Narada of His incarnations including Vamana, states 'The Vedas... were re-created by me in the Satya Yuga (Golden Age). They have once more disappeared or may only be partially heard here and there in the Puranas' (Book 12, Santi Parva, CCCXL)
- It is stated that 'By observing a fast on the twelfth day of the moon in the month of Ashadha and worshipping Krishna as the dwarf (who beguiled the Asura king Vali), one attains to the merits of the Naramedha sacrifice and sports in happiness with the Apsaras' (Book 13, Anusasana Parva, CIX)
- Vishnu states 'who behold a Brahmana that is a dwarf in stature, or a boar that has just risen from water and that bears on his head a quantity of mud taken up from the bank, have never to meet with any evil. They become freed from every sin' (Book 13, Anusasana Parva, CXXVI)

==== Harivamsa ====
Harivamsa	References	Notes
Harivamsa	Part 1: LXXVII (77), LXXX (80), CV (105), CCXVIII (218), CCXIX (219), CCXXXVI (236); Part 2: Bhavishya Parva: XXVII (27), XL-XLVI (40-46);	There are two different versions of the Harivamsa, itself considered to be an appendix to the Mahabharata. First is the shorter 'critical edition', which is split into three parts. Most notably this has been translated by Debroy. Second is the longer (likely unabridged) version in two parts. This article references the Dutt translation; there is another by Dasa.

===== First account =====
In the form of a dwarf Vishnu accepted as alms ground for placing his three [footsteps] from that descendant of Hiranyakashipu. Afterwards the Eternal Vishnu invaded the three worlds with this three footsteps and assumed a celestial form.

— Harivamsa (translated by Manmatha Nath Dutt,1897), Bhavishya Parva, Chapter XXVII, Verses 11-16

The first account consists of only one chapter (Bhavishya Parva: XXVII / 27). It begins with the Daitya Bali, having conquered Indra and the devas, conducting a Rajasuya sacrifice, officiated by Shukra and joined by 'many Brahmanas observant of ascetic vows and well read in the Vedas'. At this sacrifice Sarasvati (Lakshmi) appears and grants Bali a boon. Vamana is then born, takes the three worlds away from Bali in three footsteps, and restores Indra to power while the 'Daityas entered into the nether region'. Bali gratifies the devas with an 'offering of ambrosia', and so 'was shorn of his sins and became immortal'.

===== Second account =====
There Daksha and other Patriarchs, Pracheta, Pulaha, the foremost of the twice-born Marichi, Bhrigu, Atri, Vasishtha, Goutama, and Narada, were worshipping him. Learning, mind, sky, fire, water, earth, sound, touch, form, taste, smell, these objects of sense, the principle of greatness, the four vedas...

— HariVamsa (Dutt Translation, 1897), Bhavishya Parva, Chapter XLII, Verses 28-47
Translation:

There venerable Brahmanas, Daksa, Pracetas, Pulaha, Marichi, Bhrgu, Atri, Vasistha, Gautama and Narada. Learning, the sky, Wind, Light, Water, Earth, Sound, Touch, Form, Taste, Odour, Nature, Manifestation, and the Great Cause, the Four Vedas...

— Vamana Purana (Gupta Translation, 1968), Chapter 3, Verses 27-29

The second account of the legend of Vamana is very similar to the accounts in the Matsya Purana and Vamana Purana. As shown above in comparison to the Vamana Purana, there are even strong similarities in wording, despite being a different translation of different text by a different translator. It therefore seems likely that either all three texts share a common source, or that one is the origin of the others.

When the Lord was born as Kashyapa's son, he had eyes blood-red like the clouds of an unfair day and was of the form of a dwarf. On his breast was the mystic mark of Srivatsa. With expanded eyes the Apsaras looked at him. His effulgence was like that of a thousand suns rising simultaneously in the sky. That beautiful Lord was the supporter of Bhur, Bhuva and other lokas, had high shoulders and pure hairs, was the refuge of the pious, and offered no shelter to the iniquitous.

— Harivamsa (translated by Manmatha Nath Dutt,1897), Bhavishya Parva, Chapter XLIV, Verses 30-42

The second - and main - account of Vamana consists of 7 chapters (Bhavishya Parva: XL-XLVI / 40–46). 'Kashyapa, the well-dressed son of Marichi, espoused two sisters of Prajapati, Diti and Aditi'. Aditi gives birth to the twelve classes of celestials / Adityas / Suras (e.g. 'Indra' is the name of a post or class of a god, not an individual), and Diti gives birth to the demons / Daityas / Asuras, including Hiranyakashipu, the great-grandfather of Bali. After Hiranyakashipu is destroyed by the Narasimha incarnation, the noble Bali is crowned King of the Asuras (XL). Having defeated Indra and the Suras, Bali is congratulated by Lakshmi (XLI).

The devas seek refuge with their mother, Aditi, at her Hermitage. She tells Indra 'yourself and all the immortals cannot slay Virochana's son, Bali. Only the thousand-headed Purusha is capable of slaying him and none else'. The devas and Aditi then approach Kashyapa, who agreeing with their desire to restore Indra's throne, takes them to the celestial abode of Brahmaloka to speak with Brahma. Brahma advises them to seek Vishnu, and they do so 'at the northern bank of the ocean of milk... Reaching that place called Amrita the Suras along with Kashyapa began to practice hard austerities for many years with a view to propitiate the thousand-eyed intelligent Yogin Narayana' (XLII).

Vishnu, pleased with the austerities of the devas, agrees to Kashyapa's request to be born as Indra's 'younger brother, ever enhancing the joy of thy kinsmen and as the son of myself and Aditi'. Back at the Hermitage 'filled with saints they [the devas] engaged in the study of the Vedas and awaited Aditi's conception;. After a thousand years of pregnancy, Aditi, gives birth to Vamana, 'the protector of the devas and the destroyer of the Asuras' (XLIII). Praised and Eulogised by the devas, Vamana agrees to attend the horse sacrifice of Bali with the Rishi Vrihaspati, and while there 'will do what I think proper for regaining the three worlds'.

At the sacrifice Vamana 'assumed the form of a boy, had smokey eyes, wore sacrificial thread well-polished, and deer-skin. He had an umbrella and staff in his hands. Although not aged he appeared like an old man'. Appearing to Bali, Vamana 'of wonderful speech, with reasons and arguments laid down in the Vedas, but not visible to any, described himself unto Bali as being identical with sacrifice'. Astonished, Bali asks about Vamana and what He wants (XLIV). After describing the details and merits of the Ashvamedha sacrifice, Vamana requests three steps of land before Bali is warned by Shukra 'do not promise him any gift... He is the Great Lord Hari. Having assumed the form of a dwarf through his Maya he has come here to impose on you for the well-being of the king of devas [Indra]'.

Bali, pleased that the Lord of Sacrifice has personally attended, rejects the protests of both Shukra and his grandfather Prahlada to gift three footsteps of land to Vamana, who then displays his Universal Form. Angry, the other Asuras approach Vamana 'like insects going to a fire' (XLV). Increasing His gigantic form, Vamana smashes 'all the sons of Diti with his palms and feet'. The Asura leaders are destroyed, the three worlds possessed 'with his three-foot steps' are given back to Indra, and Bali is pleased to be assigned 'the region under the earth called Sutala'. Bali is also conferred a boon where he will benefit from the merits of things like improper sacrifices and vow-less studies, etc. Vishnu divides the world, and later Narada and Garuda discuss Vishnu with Bali, bound by celestial serpents (XLVI).

===== Links to the Varaha incarnation =====
- Notably, the horse-sacrifice (Ashvamedha) is described as 'the best of all sacrifices' and that this 'great yajna [is in] the shape of a boar with golden horns, iron hoops and gait fleet like the mind, which has profuse gold and is the origin of the universe, is highly sacred'. This may link to the Varaha incarnation (Bhavishya Parva: XLV)
- Bali, after the three worlds were taken from him by the Vamana incarnation and stricken by the consequences, mentions Varaha lifting the Earth to Narada (Bhavishya Parva: XLVI)

=== Ramayana ===
Ramayana		References	Notes
Ramayana	Valmiki version 1	Vol 1: Balakandam - XXIX (29); Ayodhyakandam - XXV (25); Vol 2: Kishkindhakandam - LVIII (58); Vol 3: Yuddhakandam - XXXIX (39); Vol 4: Uttarakanda - XXVII (27)	There are multiple versions of the Ramayana. Many are attributed to Valmiki.
Ramayana	Valmiki version 2	Bala Kanda: 28, 29; Ayodhya Kanda - 14, 25; Uttara Kanda - 4	There are multiple versions of the Ramayana. Many are attributed to Valmiki.
Ramayana	Adhyatma Ramayana	Ayodhya Kanda - V.19 (5.19); Uttara Khanda - VIII.29 (8.29)	There are multiple versions of the Ramayana. Many are attributed to Valmiki.

==== Valmiki version 1 ====
And assuming the form of a dwarf, he presented himself before Virochana's son [Bali]. And then asking for as much earth as could be covered by three footsteps, that one ever engaged in the welfare of all creatures, with the object of compassing the good of all, stood occupying the worlds. And having by his power restrained Vali [Bali], that one of exeeding energy, again conferred the three worlds upon the mighty Indra.

— Ramayana (translated by M.N. Dutt, 1891), Balakandam, Section XXIX (29)

- Siddhacrama is the name of the Hermitage 'of the high-souled Vamana' (Vol 1, Balakandam - XXIX)

==== Valmiki version 2 ====
"Upon this, the resplendent Vishnu was born of the womb of Aditi as the incarnation Vamana and disguised as a mendicant he approached king Bali. Of him, he requested a piece of ground that could be covered by three strides, and having obtained what he asked, he covered the whole universe in three steps.

— The Ramayana of Valmiki (translated by H.P. Shastri, 1952), Bala Kanda, Chapter 29 (p.64)

==== Adhyatma Ramayana ====
Seeing her son's kingdom gone, (from the hands of Indra into those of Bali), the Asura king, solicited by Aditi, in days of yore assuming the form of a Dwarf-Man (Vamana), he brought it back by begging it of Bali.

— The Adhyatma Ramayana (translated by R.B.L.B. Nath, 1979), Ayodhya Kanda, Chapter V.19

== Mahapuranas ==
=== Agni Purana ===
Agni	References	Notes
Agni	4.5-11, 5.9, 25.38-39, 31.4, 31.14-17, 43.2, 47.2, 48.4, 63.6, 110.20, 116.26, 119.14-16, 172.6, 189.3-15, 219.42-46, 236.1-5, 236.15-21, 276.10, 276.14, 291.2-5a, 305.6	

(He) re-established the celestials in their original places and was praised by the celestials. Once in the battle between the celestials and the Demons, the celestials were defeated by (demon) Bali and other demons (and) were driven away from heaven (and) sought refuge in Hari (Vishnu). Having given refuge to the devas he being praised by Aditi (wife of the latter... and mother of the celestials) and Kasyapa (a sage) became a Dwarf (as a son) of Aditi (and) went to the sacrifice (performed by Bali... and) recited the Vedas at the royal gates of Bali the sacrificer.

Having heard him reciting the Vedas, the bestower of the wanted things (Bali) said to the Dwarf in spite of being obstructed by Sukra (the preceptor of demons), "Whatever (you) desire I shall give (you)". The dwarf asked Bali, "Get (me) three [footsteps] of spaces for the sake of the preceptor. (Bali) said to him, "I shall give (you)". When the water was poured on the hand the Dwarf became a Giant (and) measured the worlds of Bhuh, Bhuvah, and Svar [ground, sky, and Heaven] with the three strides and (sent) Bali to Sutala (a nether world) and (then) Hari (Vishnu) gave the worlds to Sakra (Indra). Sakra (Indra) praised Hari (Vishnu) along with the celestials (and) remained happy as ruler of the world.

— Agni Purana (unabridged), translated by J.L. Shastri, G.P. Bhatt, and N. Gangadharan (1998), Chapter 4, Verses 5-11

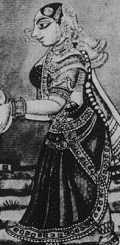
Aditi.

The first brief account of the legend of Vamana in the Agni Purana, consisting of only 7 verses (or Slokas), has been quoted above in full. Notably, despite only being two paragraphs in length, it seems to contain all the fundamentals of the legend (i.e. more elaborate accounts consisting of several chapters still follow the same steps or formula):

1. Indra and the devas are defeated by Bali, the demonic king who now rules the three worlds
2. The devas ultimately seek refuge in Vishnu, who is born to Aditi as Vamana the Brahmin-dwarf, to defeat Bali
3. Vamana attends a Sacrifice being performed by the noble Bali, who ignores warnings about Vamana to knowingly grant three steps of land
4. Vamana repossesses the three worlds in three steps which are given to Indra who rules again, and Bali is sent to the Netherworld.

Other details include:

- Siddhasrama is stated to be 'the place where Vishnu manifested as the Dwarf' (5.9)
- Images of Vamana, Narasimha, Hayagriva, and Varaha should be placed in the south-east, south-west, north-west, and north-east, respectively (43.2)
- Vamana is stated to bear 'the Conch, Disc, Mace, and Lotus' (48.4)
- Agni details the means of worshipping Vamana, via observation of the Sravanadvadasi Vrata in the month of Bhadrapada (189.3-15)
- Of the 12 battles or wars between the Devas and Asuras, the first involved Narasimha, the second Vamana, and the third Varaha (276.10-11)
- Vamana should be worshipped at Kuruksetra (305.6)

=== Bhagavata Purana ===
Bhagavata	References	Notes
Bhagavata	1.3.19; 2.7.17; 5.24.18; 6.8.13, 6.18.8; 8.11, 8.13.6, 8.15-22; 10.3.42, 10.62.2; 11.4.20; 12.12.20	

[Bali said to Sukra:] By giving charity, a benevolent and merciful person undoubtedly becomes even more auspicious, especially when he gives charity to a person like your good self. Under the circumstances, I must give this little brahmacari [Vamana] whatever charity He wants from me.

O great sage, great saintly persons like you, being completely aware of the Vedic principles for performing ritualistic ceremonies and yajnas, worship Lord Vishnu in all circumstances. Therefore, whether that same Lord Vishnu has come here to give me all benedictions or to punish me as an enemy, I must carry out His order and give Him the requested tract of land without hesitation.

— Srimad Bhagavatam (translated by Swami Prabhupada, 1977), Canto 8, Chapter 20, Verses 10-11

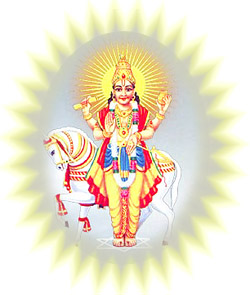
Shukra, preceptor of Bali.

The main account of the legend of Vamana in the Bhagavata Puran is narrated by Sukadeva Gosvami to King Pariksit (canto 8, chapters 15–22). Given its similarity to legends provided in the Harivamsa, as well as the Matsya, Vamana, and Skanda Purunas, it seems this account either shares a common source, or more likely (on the assumption the Bhagavata was written later) was derived from at least one of these other accounts. Quotes given below in the chapter summaries are taken from the chapter introductions provided by the Bhaktivedanta Book Trust (BBT) for conciseness.

After the Churning Of The Ocean Of Milk (see Kurma), Bali was defeated and killed by the Devas led by Indra, but was brought back by Sukracarya, who becomes his preceptor (or acarya; 11). After performing the Visvajit-yajna, and rebuilding his strength, Bali travels to the city of Indrapuri with his army for another battle with Indra, while 'Brhaspati advised the demidevas to leave the heavenly planets and keep themselves somewhere invisible... [Then Bali], in performing one hundred asvamedha-yajnas... enjoyed the opulences of the heavenly planets' (15). Aditi, to help her son Indra, performs penances to propitiate Vishnu, as taught by Kashyapa (16). Krishna, 'being very pleased by the payo-vrata ceremony performed by Aditi... agreed to become her son' (17).

After Vamana is born and assumes the form of a dwarf, the Jatakarma (birthday) and sacred thread ceremonies are performed. Vamana then visits the sacrificial arena [of Bali] on the northern side of the Narmada River, at the field known as Bhṛgukaccha, where brahmanas of the Bhrigu dynasty were performing yajnas... after washing the Lord's feet, Bali Maharaja immediately accepted the water from the Lord's feet on his head and felt that he and his predecessors had certainly been glorified. Then Bali Maharaja inquired of Lord Vamanadeva's welfare and requested the Lord to ask him for money, jewels or anything He might desire' (18).

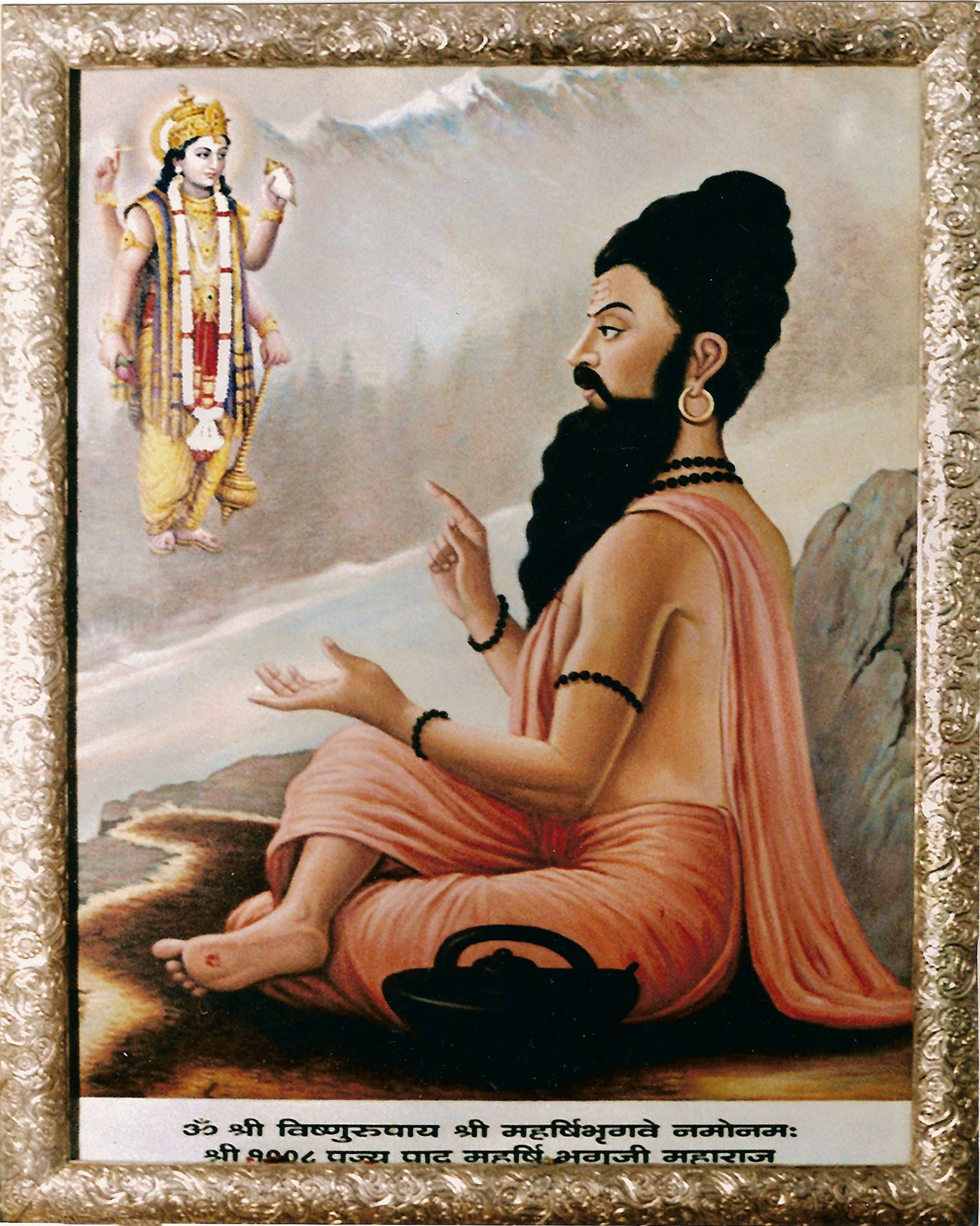
Bhrigu.

Vamana praises Hiranyakasipu and Hiranyaksa before asking for three footsteps of land. However, Sukracarya knows the dwarf is Vishnu acting on behalf of Indra, and so forbids Bali to gift anything (19). As it 'is the duty of a householder to maintain the principles of religion... Bali Maharaja thought it improper to withdraw his promise... Lord Vamanadeva then immediately extended Himself into a universal body. By the mercy of Lord Vamanadeva, Bali Maharaja could see that the Lord is all-pervading and that everything rests in His body... The Lord gradually covered the entire surface of the world, and by extending His body He covered the entire sky. With His hands He covered all directions, and with His second footstep He covered the entire upper planetary system. Therefore, there was no vacant place where He could take His third footstep' (20).

Seeing Bali deprived of everything in two steps, angry demons attack Vamana, but are defeated and - on Bali's order - are banished to the netherworld. Bali is arrested and bound with the rope of Varuna by Garuda, before Vishnu asks for the third step of land promised. However, as 'Lord Vishnu appreciated Bali Maharaja's determination and integrity, when Bali Maharaja was unable to fulfill his promise, Lord Vishnu ascertained that the place for him would be the planet Sutala, which is better than the planets of heaven' (21). Bali remembers the devotion of his grandfather, Prahlada, and so offers his head to Vishnu for the third step; pleased with this devotion, Krishna offers 'His disc to protect Bali Maharaja' and promises to remain with him as a doorkeeper (22). Other details include:

- Vamana is the 15th overall incarnation of Krishna (1.3.19)
- Vamana is stated to have had a wife called Kirti with whom 'He begot one son, named Bṛhatsloka, who had many sons, headed by Saubhaga' (6.18.8). Aiyangar states that Kirti means 'Fame', Brihat-soka means 'great praise', and Sanbhaga means 'Happiness'. The only other mention of a wife is made in the Vishnu Puran, whose name there is stated to be Padma or Kamala (see below)
- According to the Brahmavaivarta Puran, Aditi performed a different ceremony to beget Vamana, called the Supunyaka Vrata (see below)
- The 'kaccha' from 'Bhrgukaccha' (8.18) refers to tortoises, as well as to soil
- Krishna informs his parents, Vasudeva and Devaki, that He was also previously their son as Vamana (also known as Upendra) when they were Kashyapa and Aditi (10.3.42)
- Bana, the eldest son of Bali, was a devotee of Shiva and 'especially satisfied the lord by playing a musical accompaniment with his one thousand arms' (10.62.2)

=== Brahma Purana ===
Brahma	References	Notes
Brahma	57.36-42, 58.24, 70.13-20, 71.29-35, 75.14-20, 104.70-98; Gautami-Mahatmya: 4, 52.29-43, 52.68-73	

==== First account ====
With the soles of his feet and the palms of his hands he [Vamana] crushed Daityas. He assumed a great and terrible form and roamed over the Earth. As he grew in size and roamed over the Earth, the moon and the sun at first stood on a level with his chest. When he flew up in the sky they stood against his umbilicus. When he of unmeasured prowess further grew in size they stood on a level with his knees.

— Brahma Purana (unknown translator, 1955), Chapter 104, Verses 94-96

Although the first account of the legend of Vamana in Brahma Purana is brief and otherwise entirely typical in nature, it is notable that 20 of the 28 verses focus on detailing the names and attributes of the Asuras that either attacked and/or were destroyed by Vamana. The remaining 8 verses (or slokas) relay the legend itself, whereby Vishnu adopts the dwarf-form of Vamana, attends 'the yajna of the powerful Bali', crushes the demons in His gigantic form, and returns control of the three worlds to Indra.

==== Second account ====
After standing firmly on the back of the tortoise he [Vamana] placed a step in the sacrificial hall of Bali. He, the eternal lord, placed the second step over the whole world. Then he said to Bali: "O lord of Asuras, there is no place for the third step. Where shall I place the third step? Give me the ground." Laughingly Bali said with palms joined in reverence. He was accompanied by his wife. ["]The entire universe has been created by you, O lord of Devas. I am not a creator. Due to your fault it has become too small, O lord of cosmic identity. Still I have never uttered a lie, nor will I ever utter a lie proving me to be a man of truthful statement. Step on my back["].

— Brahma Purana (unknown translator, 1955), Gautami-Mahatmya, Chapter 4, Verses 48-52

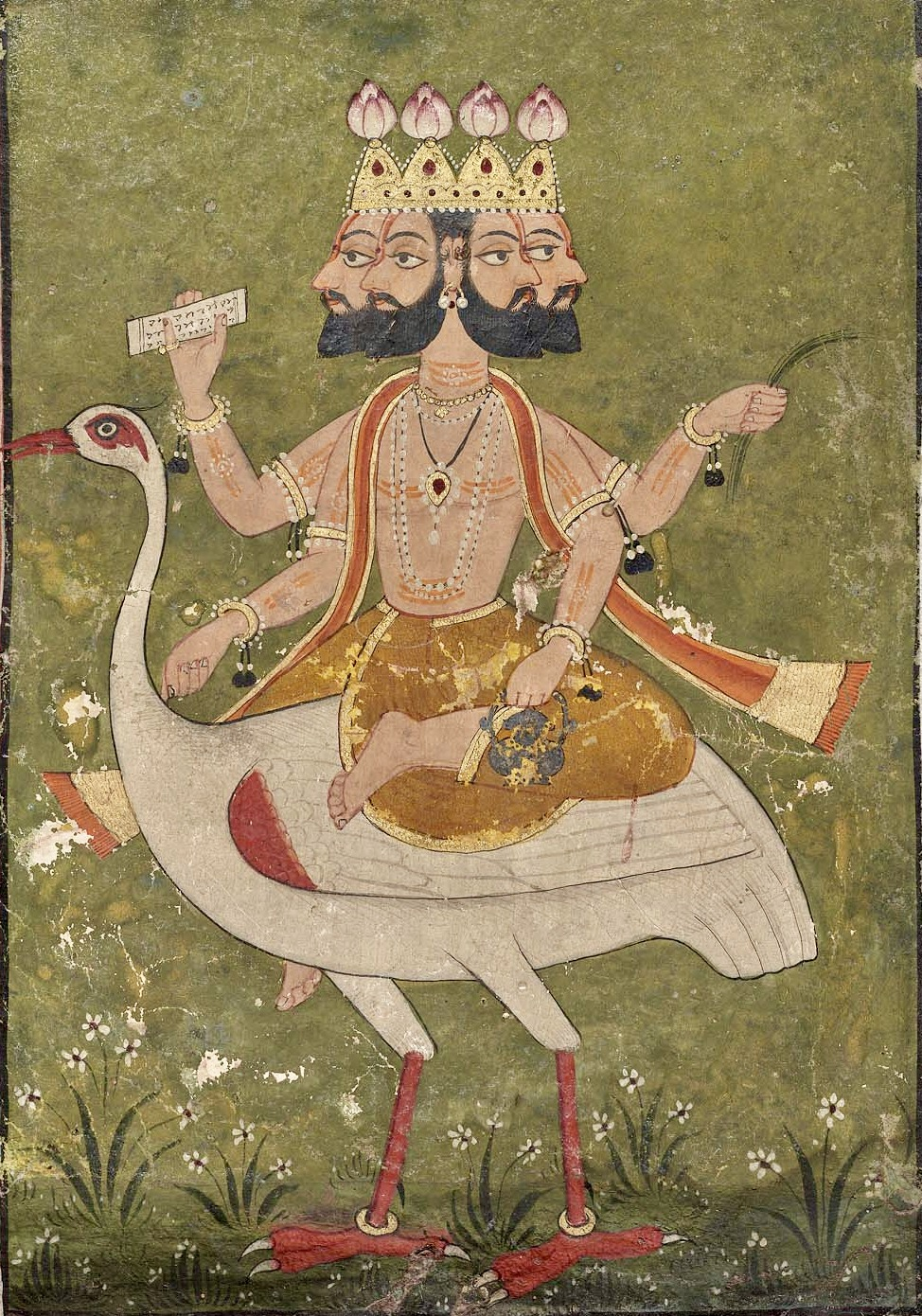
Brahma on Hamsa.

The second account of the legend of Vamana consists of an entire chapter (Gautami-Mahatmya: 4; 68 verses). Narrated by Brahma to Narada, it differs from the usual accounts insofar as the devas led by Indra are 'defeated' not in a literal battle, but rather by the good and noble qualities of the invincible Bali, under whose rule 'there were no enemies, no ailments, no anxieties in any way.. While Bali was ruling over the kingdom, none of these was seen even in dream, viz. famine, evil, denial of God, [or] wickedness'. Jealous and miserable, the devas seek refuge in Vishnu, who states Bali is a devotee, 'cannot be conquered by Devas or Asuras', but can be bound 'by means of words with miraculous power' to return the kingdom to them. Vishnu enters the womb of Aditi and is born as the dwarf, Vamana. Assuming the form of a Brahmin, Vamana then attends the sacrifice of Bali 'singing Saman verses'. The preceptor of the demons, Sukra - a descendant of Bhrgu - warns Bali and his wife about Vamana, and Bali responds 'Blessed I am because the lord of sacrifices is coming to my house so unexpectedly'.

Vamana requests three steps of land, this is granted by Bali, and Vamana grows in size, covering all of existence in two steps, as quoted above. Pleased with Bali, Vamana offers a boon but Bali does not wish for anything. The three worlds are returned to Indra, and Bali and his family are sent to the netherworld.

=== Brahmanda Purana ===
Brahmanda	References	Notes
Brahmanda	Part 1: --; Part 2: 33.25, 37.4-5; Part 3: 72.14b-16, 72.73, 72.77-78, 73.75-87, 74.26; Part 4: --; Part 5: --	

When Bali, the lord of Daityas and the son of Virocana, was performing a sacrifice, he [Vishnu] became a Brahmana, the delighter of the family of Aditi and spoke thus to Bali at an auspicious time :-

"You are the king of the three worlds. Everything is vested in you. It behoves you, O king, to give me three paces of land", so said the lord.

"I shall of course give", said the king Bali, the son of Virocana. Thinking of him to be only a dwarf he became glad and offered the same. That Vamana, O excellent Brahmanas, the lord covered the entire universe by means of three paces, viz., heaven, ether, and Earth.

— Brahmanda Purana, (translated by G.V. Tagare, 1958), Part 3, Chapter 73, Verses 75-78

A brief account of the legend of Vamana is provided in the Brahmanda Purana (Part 3: 73.75-87). It is notable as one of the few accounts where Bali is neither forewarned nor aware of the true nature of Vamana, or the consequences for gifting a three footsteps of land. In addition, while Bali and other 'Asuras along with their sons and grandsons' are driven to Sutala by Vamana, the 'cruel ones among them were [also] killed'. After the Devas, Danavas (including Bali), and human beings see the gigantic universal form of Vamana - containing the universe within it - the three worlds are bestowed back to the 'noble-souled' leader of the Devas, Indra. Other details include:

- The tip of one of Vishnu's toes, while He took the three steps to reclaim the three worlds from Bali, created the Ganges river (37.4-5)
- Of the 12 battles or wars between the Devas and Asuras, the first involved Narasimha, the second Vamana, and the third Varaha (72.73)
- Bali is described as 'noble-minded' and as a 'great Yogin' (74.26)

=== Brahmavaivarta Purana ===
Brahmavaivarta	References	Notes
Brahmavaivarta	Part 1: Prakrti-Khanda - 42 (385), Ganapati-Khanda - 6 (p. 528), 38 (667); Part 2: Krsna-Janma-Khanda - 7 (65), 9 (74), 10 (81), 12 (85), 22 (193), 40 (322; Shiva turns into a 'dwarf Brahmana boy'), 47 (378; meeting Indra), 61 (431), 82 (525), 110 (671), 115 (695), 119 (706)	The Nager translation (in two parts) does not provide verse numbers. Page numbers have been provided instead.

[Vamana said:] O Indra, definitely the universe is of various types and the kalpas are also different while the Brahmandas are innumerable. In these Brahmandas several Brahma, Vishnu, Mahesvara and Indras have emerged. Who can count their numbers but I am aware of all of them. O best of the gods, even if one is able to count the particles of dust on earth, in spite of that the number of Indras cannot be counted... The life and sovereignty of Indra is limited to four yugas. After the fall of twenty eight Indras, a day of Brahma is counted.

— Brahmavaivarta Purana (translated by R.N. Sen, 1920), Krsna-Janma-Khanda, 47 (p.379)

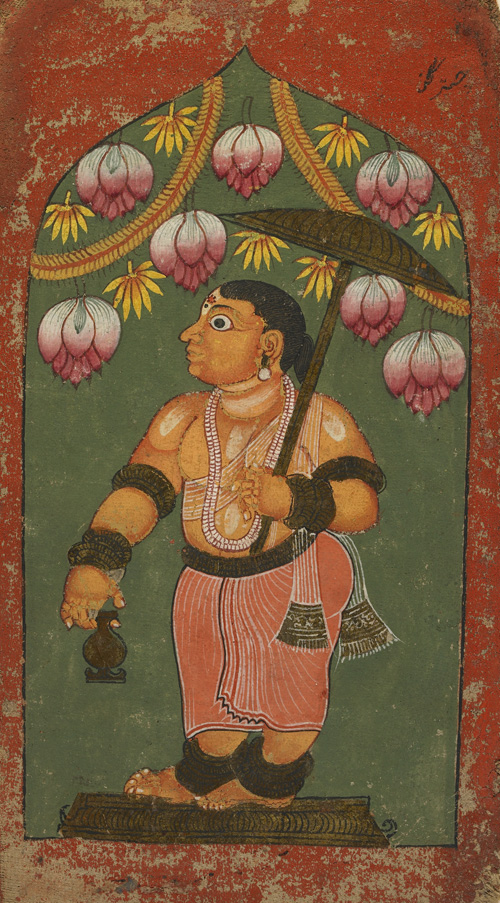
Vamana.

The legend of Vamana quoted above seems to be unique to the Brahmavaivarta Purana (Krsna-Janma-Khanda: Chapter 47). In this account, Visvakarma is employed by Indra to rebuild the city of Amaravati after it is destroyed. A year later, with Indra still not satisfied and unable to return to his abode, Visvakarma seeks the help of Brahma. Brahma in turn seeks the help of Vishnu, who incarnates in the 'form of a Brahmana boy... He wore a serene smile on his face which was quite charming'. Indra becomes arrogant and haughty after being asked about the length of time Visvakarma must be engaged, so as quoted above, Vamana points out there have been innumerable Indras in innumerable universes.

Countless thousands of ants appear, and Vamana states to Indra that every one of them was previously enthroned as an Indra. He adds that all the ants had achieved their positions - high and low - because of their Karmas, alone. A sage called Lomasa arrives later, and asked why a patch of hair was missing from his chest, states that he loses a hair every time an Indra dies. He adds that there have been innumerable Brahmas, and that yet with 'the fall [death] of [a] Brahma, Vishnu winks but once'. Vamana - who turns out to be 'Shiva in the form of Vishnu' - and Lomasa disappear. Indra, looking at 'the whole scene like a dream', is left more humbled and intelligent. Visvakarma is thus generously rewarded with riches for his work by Indra and sent back to his own abode.

A more typical account of Vamana is also provided elsewhere in the Purana. Quoted below, it is given as one of a series of examples where Indra becomes arrogant and so has his pride shattered by Vishnu (Indra's pride and humbling is also the premise of other legends such as that of Kurma, the tortoise incarnation):

In the earlier times Indra, after churning the ocean, consumed the nectar and defeated the demons. As a result of this he was inflated with pride. Thereafter lord Krsna got his pride shattered through Bali. All the gods like Indra and others had been deprived of their glory. Thereafter with the reciting of the stotra of Brhaspati and performing of the vratas by Aditi, the lord was pleased and he incarnated himself as the incarnation of Vamana from the womb of Aditi. Thereafter the compassionate lord begged from Bali for his kingdom and restored Mahendra to the gem-studded lion-throne and well established the gods.

— Brahmavaivarta Purana (translated by R.N. Sen, 1920), Krsna-Janma-Khanda, 61 (p.431)

Other details include:

- It is stated that Bali consumes the sacrifices improperly performed (also stated in other texts such as the Harivamsa and Vamana Purana; Part 1: Prakrti-Khanda - 42)
- The Supunyaka Vrata (vow) is undertaken by women ('in the bright thirteenth day of the moon in the month of Magha') to propitiate Krishna and through His favour beget a son; it is stated that Aditi performed the Supunyaka Vrata to get 'a son who happened to be the dwarf incarnation' (Part 1: Ganapati-Khanda - 6); According to the Bhagavata Puran, Aditi instead performed the payovrata (see above).
- The Prajapati Sutapa and his wife Prsni pleased Vishnu so much with their tapas (religious austerities) that he agreed to be their son, including a second time as Vamana in their incarnations as Kashyapa and Aditi, and ultimately a third time as Krishna in their incarnations as Vasudeva and Devaki (Part 2: Krsna-Janma-Khanda - 7)
- Ratnamala, the daughter of Bali, 'felt attracted towards Vamana and desired to have him as her son, she had thought in her mind that the son like him should be fed by her from her breasts'. Her wish was granted by Vishnu: incarnated as Putana, the demoness breastfed poison to baby Krishna before being killed (and therefore liberated) by Him (Part 2: 10 and 115)
- Shiva incarnated as a dwarf Brahmana - described almost identically to Vamana - when concerned for Parvati, who had grown weak due to practising austerities (Part 2: 40); this may be a reference to Vajasaneyi Samhita (White Yajurveda, Book 16, see above).

=== Garuda Purana ===
Garuda	References	Notes
Garuda	Part 1: Vamana: 1.27, 15.3, 45.5, 45.20, 86.10-11, 131.3, 131.10-16; Bali: 6.45-46, 87.36, 113.15-16; Part 2: Vamana: 194.10, 196.7, 233.3; Bali (Narayana Bali): Dharma Kanda - 4.103, 4.113-115; Part 3: Vamana: 15.20, 23.79, 26.63-66, 29.53; Bali: 27.8-9	Part 3 (Brahma Moska Kanda) 1.51-52 classifies Puranas.

Obeisance to Karma which forces Brahma to work like a potter in the bowels of [the] cosmos by which Vishnu was cast into distress of ten incarnations; by which Rudra was compelled to beg for alms with a skull in his hand and at the behest of which the sun goes round and round in the sky.

The donor was King Bali, the receiver Lord Vishnu himself, the gift consisted of the whole Earth and that too in the presence of learned brahmins. What did he get in return? Only bondage. O fate! obeisance to Thee - who workest as it pleasest thee.

— Garuda Purana, translated by 'a board of scholars' (1957), Part 1, Chapter 113, Verses 15-16

It seems that the legend of Vamana is only briefly mentioned in the Garuda Purana, such as in the example quoted above. Other details include:

- 'Vamana' is one of the 1,000 names of Vishnu (Vishnu Sahasranama), as is 'Balibandhanakrt' ('who fettered the demon bali'), Trivikrama ('having three steps'), and 'Bali' (Part 1: 15.3)
- The Salagrama stone for Vamana 'is circular and short' (Part 1: 45.20)
- Vamana is listed as fifth in Dashavatara, the ten principle incarnations of Vishnu (Part 1: 86.10-11)
- 'Vamana' is one of the names of Vishnu to repeat at a sacred rite to take place 'On the eighth day in the dark half mingled with the Rohini star' (Part 1: 131.3; 10–16)
- Bali is stated by Hari to be the son of Virocana, grandson of Prahlada, the son of Hiranyakasipu (killed by the Narasimha avatar of Vishnu), and to have had 100 sons of his own, the eldest being Bana (Part 1: 6.45-46)
- During the reign of the next (eighth) Manu called Savarni, Bali will be elected to the post of Indra (Part 1: 87.36)
- It is stated that the 'idol of dadhivamana [Vamana] should have the size of [a] barley corn. It should be round, blue in hue, slender in proportion and of pleasant aspect. It should wield a pair of wheels, five gopuras, bow and arrow. It should be straight and round and adorned with a garland of wild flowers. It should contain a thousand heads, a silvery dot on the right side of the forehead and an auspicious semicircular mark on the left and the full moon in the middle. Such auspicious gifts are attended by good fortune to the donor' (Part 2: 26.63-66)

=== Kurma Purana ===
Kurma	References	Notes
Kurma	16.46-69, 44.62, 49.33-36	

Then after some time, Bali, the son of Virocana, worshipped the omnipresent Vishnu, the lord of sacrifices, with sacrificial offerings. He adored the Brahmanas with offerings of plenty of wealth, and the Brahman-sages came thither to the sacrificial hall of the high-souled (Bali). Learning about it, lord Vishnu, urged by Bharadvaja, came to the sacrificial spot, assuming the form of a dwarf. Wearing a black-coloured deer-skin, and sacred thread and holding a Palasa rod. the Brahmana (formed Vishnu) with matted hair and besmeared with ashes, came thither reciting the Vedas. Approaching near the demon-king, the mendicant Hari begged of king Bali land, measuring three steps of his feet. Taking the golden vasel, and rinsing his mouth, the devout Bali washed the feet of Vishnu, and contemplating about the resolve 'I will give unto thee the land covered by three steps of thine, may the undecaying Hari be propitiated’, [and then] dropped cool water on the finger-tips of the lord.

Thereupon the primeval lord placed his steps on the earth, the sky and then the heaven with the object of detracting the demon-king who had sought shelter with him from the worldly attachment. Treading upon the triple world; the feet of the lord extended from the region of Prajapati to that of Brahma. The Siddhas who dwelt there bent down in obeisance to that lord who was equal to thousand suns in lustre.

— Kurma Purana (translated by A.S. Gupta, 1972), Chapter 16, Verses 46-54

In the Kurma Purana, there are two accounts of Vamana.

==== First account ====
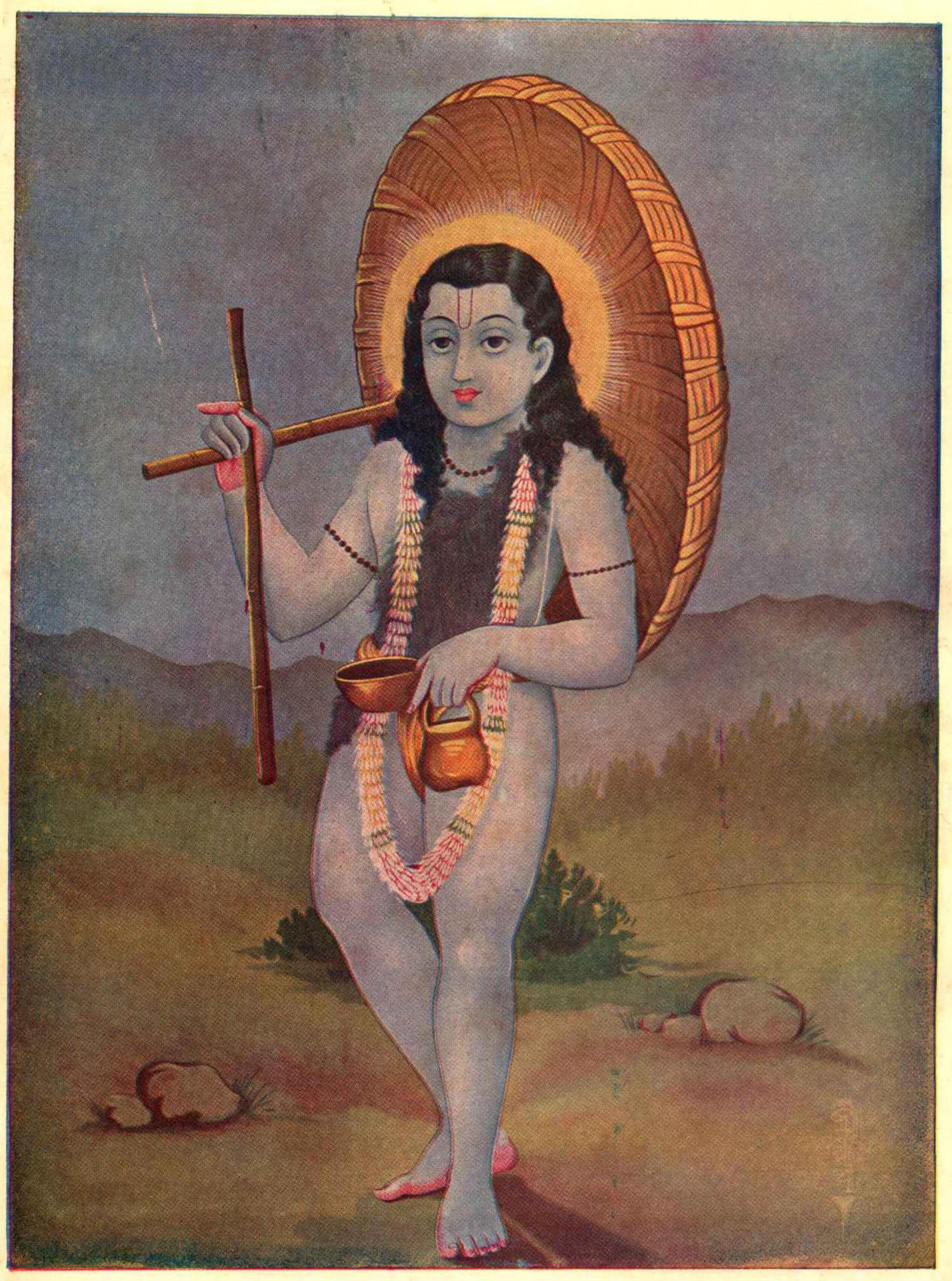
Vamana.

In the first account, following the part quoted above, Vamana covering all three worlds in three steps splits the cosmic egg, and the consequent flow of water rushing into it is 'termed by Brahma' as the Ganges. Vamana then tells Bali that he will be banished to the netherworld until merging with Him at the time of dissolution (i.e. at the end of the Kalpa, which lasts 1,000 Yugas in total). Vamana gives the three worlds back to Indra before disappearing in front of everyone's eyes. In the nether world, the devotee Bali seeks instruction from his grandfather, Prahlada, to worship and seek refuge in Vishnu (16.46-69).

Prahlada is also directly linked with the legend of Narasimha, the fourth (man-lion) incarnation of Vishnu, who killed Hiranyakashipu. Hiranyakashipu is the father of Prahlada, great-grandfather of Bali, and elder brother of Hiranyaksha. The latter was killed by Varaha, the third (boar) incarnation of Vishnu. Both Hiranyakashipu and Hiranyaksha themselves are the first of three incarnations of Jaya and Vijaya, the doorkeepers of Vishnu cursed by the Four Kumaras.

==== Second account ====
In a second and much briefer account, it is stated that in 'this Vaivasvata Manuvantra, Vishnu was born of Kashyapa and Aditi as Vamana. Winning the three worlds with his three steps, this high-souled lord gave in to Indra the triple world bereft of all obstacles... Since this entire world was entied by the high-souled Vamana, therefore he is called by all as Vishnu due to the root 'Vis' (to enter) involved herein' (49.33-36). Vaivasvata, also known as Shraddhadeva Manu, is the current and seventh of fourteen total Manus that rule the current Kalpa in succession. Vaivasvata is also directly linked with the legend of Matsya, the first (fish) incarnation of Vishnu, who rescued him from the deluge at the end of the reign of the sixth Manu, Chakshusha.

=== Linga Purana ===
Linga	References	Notes
Linga	Part 1: 45.11, 65.54b-60, 91.52, 95.46; Part 2: 96.17-22, Section II: 6.23, 48.31-32;	Part 2 continues up to chapter 108 and then starts at chapter 1 again.

You held aloft the Mandara mountain in the form of a tortoise; the earth was lifted up by the Boar. With [the] leonine form, Hiranyakasipu was killed. Again Bali was bound by you in the form of Vamana taking up three steps. You alone are the unchanging lord of all living beings.

— Linga Purana (translated by J.L.Shastri), Part 1, Chapter 96, Verse 17-22

In the Linga Purana, the legend of Vamana is only briefly mentioned, as quoted above. Other details include:

- 'Vamana' and 'Trikrama' ('one who has taken three steps') are listed as two of the 1,000 names of Shiva (Part 1: 65.54b-60)
- Matala, the netherworld or Hell, 'is occupied by Ananta, Mucukunda and king Bali who is the resident of Patala and Svarga' (Part 1: 45.11)
- It is stated that 'Omkara is identical with the three worlds, the three Vedas, the three sacrificial fires, the three steps of Vishnu, the three scriptures, viz. Rk, Samans and Yajur mantras' (Part 1: 91.52)
- Vamana is listed in the Dashavatara, or ten principle incarnations of Vishnu (Part 2: 48.31-32)

=== Markandeya Purana ===
Markandeya	References	Notes
Markandeya	V.56;	

It seems that in the Markandeya Purana, the legend of Vamana is not mentioned.

=== Matsya Purana ===
Matsya	References	Notes
Matsya	Vamana: XLVII.72-75, (47.72-75), XLVII.213-244 (47.213-244), LII.18 (52.18), CCXLIV-CCXLVI (244-246); Bali: VI.6-10 (6.6-10), XLVII.41-57 (47.41-57), CXXV.1 (135.1), CLXXXVII.38-42 (187.38-42)	

[Bali said] "Lord Vamana, you look so dear and charming. I shall be please to give you heaps of gold, gems, elephants, horses, fairest women, clothes, ornaments, villages, [and] the land of the seven oceans. Ask for out of these that you make like best. I will give that to you". When Bali uttered such words with so much feeling, Lord Vamana smiled and gravely said - "King, give Me simply land measured by My three [footsteps]. Give gems, gold, villages, etc., to those who ask for them". Bali said - "Why do you ask for three [footsteps] of land only? What purpose of yours will be served by that? You are most welcome to take [a] hundred or thousand [footsteps] of land". Vamana said - "I shall be amply satisfied with this much land. I only want this much. The rest of your gifts you may confer on other people who ask for them".

Hearing those words of Vamana, the demon king Bali gave three [footsteps] of land to the Lord. After the Lord has received the promise that Bali would make the required gift, He instantly began to grow, who is composed of all the Devas. He had the Sun and the Moon for His eyes, Heaven was His forehead, the earth became His feet...

— Matsya Purana (translated by A. Taluqdar, 1916), Chapter CCXLVI (246), Verses 45-53

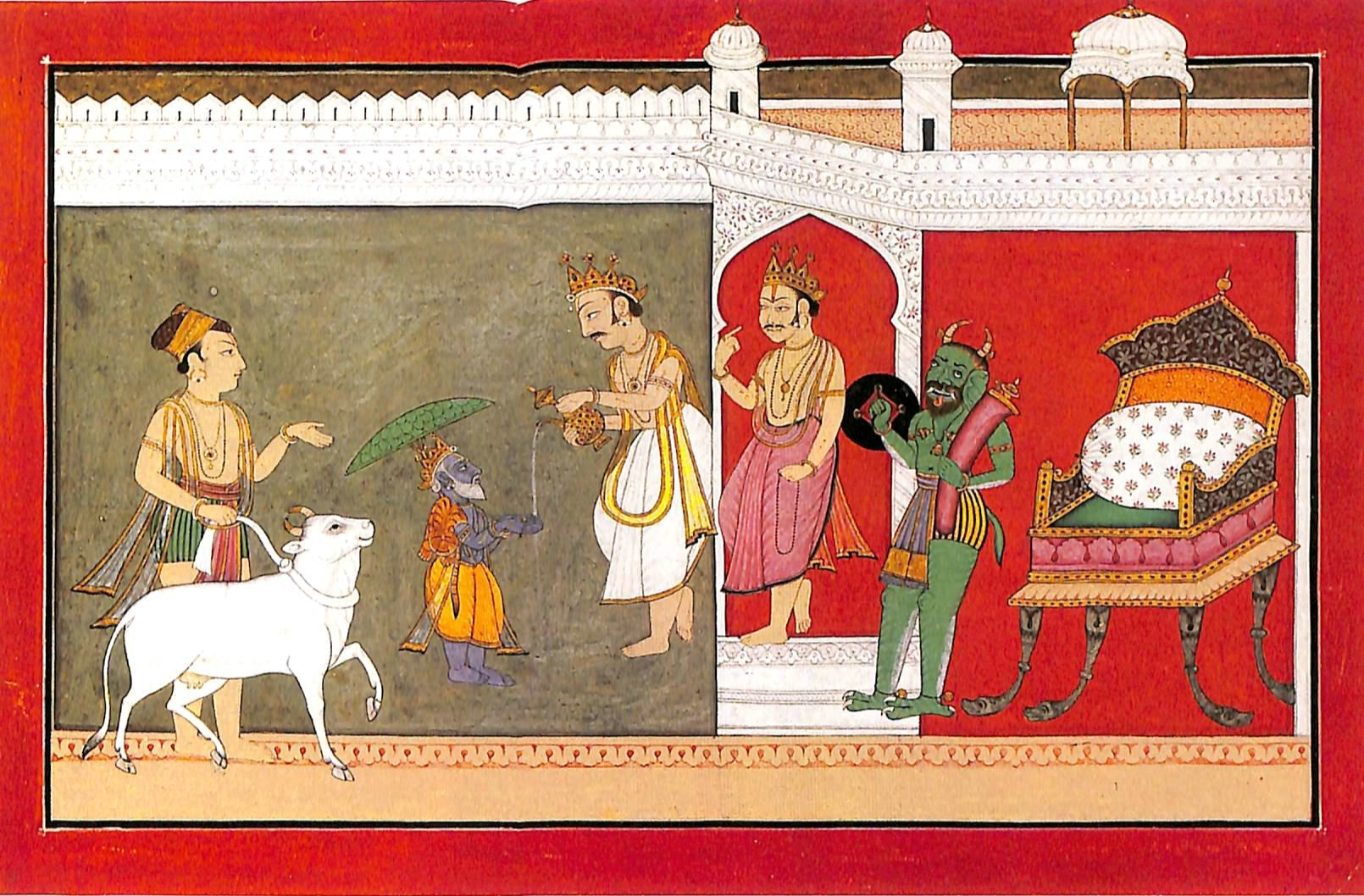
Vamana with Bali, painting by the Mahesh of Chamba (fl. c. 1730 - 1770). Rietberg Museum

In the Matsya Purana, three chapters are dedicated to the legend of Vamana. It has elements and descriptions very similar to that of the Vamana Purana in particular. In this account, Shaunaka tells Arjuna that after Indra is vanquished by the Asuras, his mother, Aditi, 'the mother of the Devas began to practise rigid austerities. For one thousand years she worshipped Lord Krishna by living on air alone, and on seeing Her children oppressed by the [Asuras] she said to Herself that Her sons were born in vain'. Vishnu, pleased with the devotion of Aditi, agrees to her request to restore Indra to power and states 'I shall therefore be born of you through Kashyapa when I shall kill all the demons' (CCXLIV / 244).

After the demons lose their lustre, Bali enquiries from his grandfather and Devotee of Vishnu, Prahlada, what the reason is. Meditating on Hari, Prahlada has a vision of Vamana and informs Bali, who initially scoffs but apologises after being cursed as 'indiscriminate, vicious and disrespectful'. Upon the birth of Vamana, 'all the Devas, even the Demons, men, earth, heaven, [and the] sky became peaceful', while Brahma prays and performs the appropriate birth ceremonies. Brahma gives Vamana a (Black) deerskin to wear, Vrihaspati the sacred thread, Marichi (Son Of Brahma) the Danda, Vasitha the Kamandala, Angira gives Kusa grass and the Vedas, Pulaha the Aksasutra (Rosary Beads), and Pulastya the white raiment. As Vamana proceeds to the sacrifice of King Bali, the 'portion of the land on which Vamana put His feet in walking sank down and a deep hole appeared there and He made the whole world with all its mountains to oceans... quiver though He walked slowly' (CCXLV / 245).

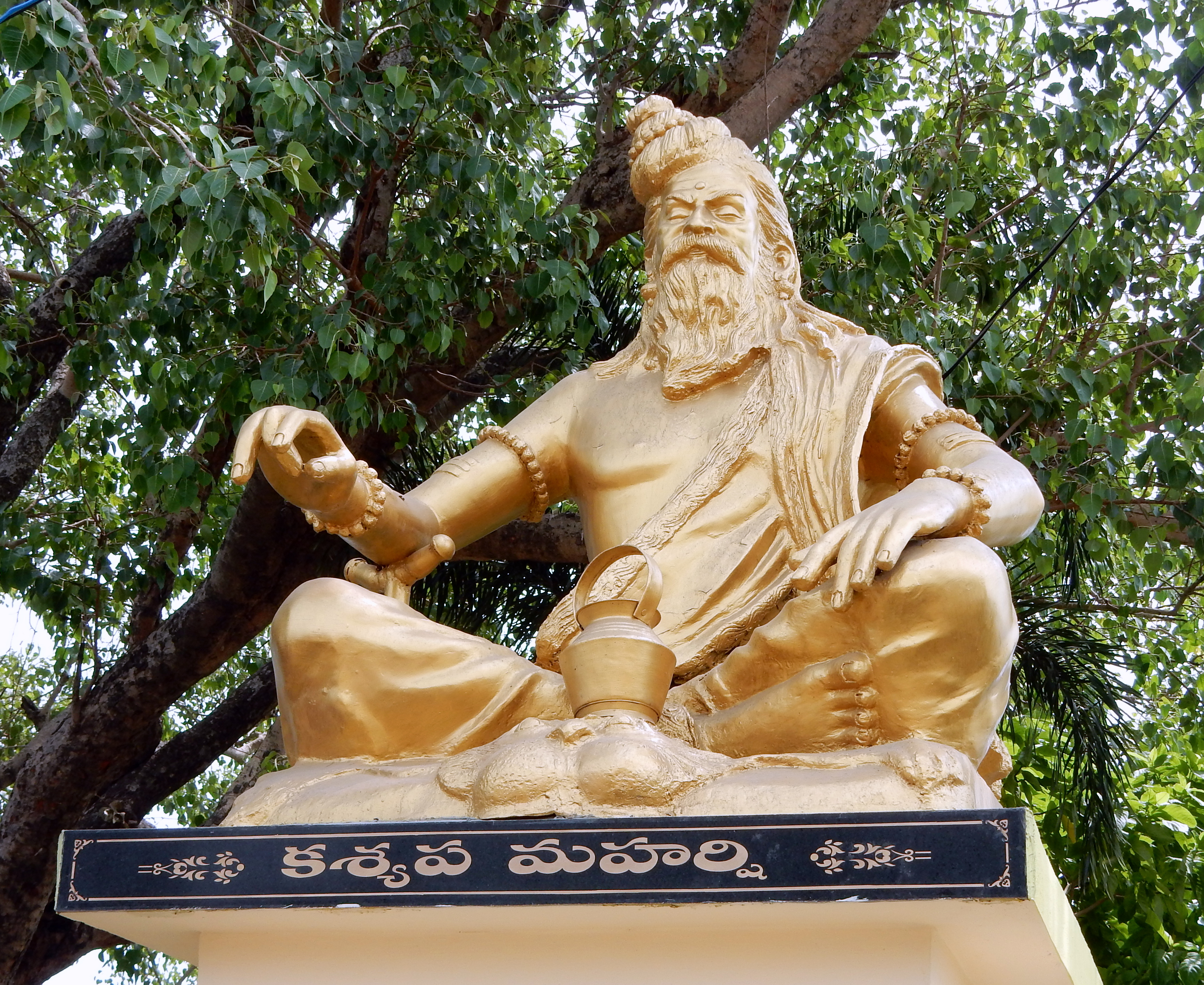
Kashyapa.

Bali enquires from his preceptor Shukra why his sacrifices are not being accepted by Agni, and is informed Vamana is coming to the sacrifice. Although realising that Vishnu cannot be refused, Bali is still considers it 'uncommon good fortune that the Lord, for whose sake various asceticism, gifts, sacrifices, etc., are performed' will accept his offering in person. Bali offers any riches or any amount of land Vamana chooses, but is requested to give only three steps.

Upon agreement, Vamana 'spread His vast Form and He measured the earth in the twinkling of an eye', and spreading over the three worlds, 'killed the great Asuras for the benefit of the Devas'. Vamana gives the three worlds to Indra and the nether regions to Bali, with the promise that after 'Vaivasvata Manu [7th and current ruling Manu] is succeeded by Savarni Manu, you will become Indra [i.e. King Of The devas]'. Vamana also mentions that as Bali in 'ancient times' had worshipped Him most devoutly, he can go to live in Patala, 'abounding in excellent gardens, palaces, luxuriant flowers, lakes, rivers' etc. Vamana then vanishes (CCXLVI / 246). Other details include:

- The oldest of Bali's 100 sons is Bana, who had 1,000 arms (VI.6-10 / 6.6-10)
- Bali reigned for 20,080,000 years (XLVII.55-57 / 47.55-57)
- The queen of Bali is Vindhyabali (CLXXXVII.38-42 / 187.38-42)
- The place where Bali performed sacrifices is called Ilavrita Varsa, 'famous as being the birthplace of all the Devas' (CXXV.1 / 135.1)
- Shuka states 'O Prahlada, your grandson, King Bali, will reign with all glory, in different realms for, even, Lord Vishnu will promise this secretly to your grandson, when He will deprive him of his kingdom in His Dwarf incarnation... Shiva, the most supreme Lord of the entire universe, has spoken to me, as a secret, that Bali will be the future King of the Devas [i.e. Indra], and therefore He, invisible to all, is awaiting that time, O Prahlada'. (XLVII.213-244 / 47.213-244)
- It is stated "Namah Karanavamanya on the fore of the teeth [is] sacred to [the] Svati asterism and [the] Vamana (Dwarf) incarnation" (LII.18 / 52.18)

=== Narada Purana ===
Narada	References	Notes
Narada	Part 1: 2.9-11, 2.40, 11, 17.59-61, 40.30; Part 2: 51.82b-83 (Bali: food offering); Part 3: 66.44-49, 66.86-100, 68.59-60 (Bali: food offering) 70.24-27, 71.154-156, Part 4: 120.36b-41a, 121.23b-24; Uttarabhaga - 29.41 Part 5: Uttarabhaga - 46.46, 56.48-50, 56.26-29, 56.48-50, 65.29b-30a, 65.91-92	The Narada Purana focuses on worship and rituals.

Thereafter, the highly blessed Aditi, who was extremely glad and was respected all over the world, in due course of time gave birth to a son whom the whole world paid obeisance. He was named Vamana. He was holding a Conch and a Discus in his hands. He was quiescent. He shone in the middle of the lunar sphere. The pot of nectar and curds mixed with cooked rice were in his hands. He was Lord Vishnu himself resembling [a] thousand suns in brilliance. He eyes were like a full blown lotus. He was adorned with all ornaments and was clad in a yellow garment.

Realising that Hari who was worthy of being eulogised and was the sole leader of all the worlds, had manifested himself accompanied by hosts of sages, Kashyapa [husband of Aditi and father of the Adityas and Asuras/Daityas] was overwhelmed with joy. With palms joined in reverence, he bowed to him and began to praise him.

— Narada Purana, unknown translator (1952), Part 1, Chapter 11, Verses 68-71

In the Narada Purana, the legend of Vamana is given in chapter eleven. The (anonymous) translator in footnote 12 to this chapter (p. 208) states that the 'gift of land has been highly praised as the most meritorious, from ancient times. Apararka quotes many verses from the Visnudharmottara Puran, the Aditya Purana and Matsya Purana... and states that there is no gift comparable to the gift of land. Verses pertaining to land-grant are common not only in Puranas or Smrti works but are recorded on inscriptions and copper-plates of such grants all over India'.

In this account, Vishnu visits and offers Aditi a boon, being pleased with her penances. Aditi requests that her sons, the Devas, be restored to power, but without 'any harm unto [the] Daityas, since they too are my sons' (i.e. via her sister and co-wife of Kashyapa, Diti). Vishnu agrees, and promises to be born as her son, Vamana. Praised by Kashyapa upon His birth before taking 'leave of his mother and father, that Brahmana bachelor Vamana, went over to the great sacrifice of the supremely affluent Daitya [Bali], that was being performed'. Sukra warns Bali and advises him not to give anything to Vamana, but Bali refuses, stating 'O preceptor, you should not tender such advice which is contrary to the path of virtue. If Visnu himself partakes of oblations or gifts, what can be better than that?' Vamana arrives, is greeted by Bali in reverence, and explains the virtues of gifting lands to Brahmanas with the story of Bhadramati before asking for 'a plot of land measuring three steps'. As Bali takes up a pitcher of water to offer the land, Sukra attempts to obstruct the flow of water to prevent the offering, but Vamana uses the tip of Kusa/Darbha grass to touch the spout of the pitcher and completes it.

'Vishnu, that Soul of the Universe began to grow in size till he reached the abode of Brahma', and taking three steps, pierces the crust of the Cosmic Egg. The water that flows in and washes His feet 'thereby became pure and sanctified the world... It was served as resorted by the seven sages (The Ursa Major). Then it fell on the top of mount Meru' to become the Ganges. The three worlds are thus returned to the Devas, Bali is given Rasatala 'along with all his Asuras', and Vamana goes to a 'forest for performing penance' (11). Other details include:

- On the Dvadasi day in the bright half of the month of Asadha, one should fast and worship Vamana, who 'is the bestower of intellect' (e.g. Part 1: 17.59-61, Part 4: 120.36b-41a)
- Chapter 10 details the defeat of the Devas by Bali, where the Asuras also attempt to convince Aditi to stop her penances to Vishnu (Part 1: 10)
- During the eighth Manvantara (i.e. reign of the 8th of 14 total Manus in this Kalpa; currently we are ruled by the seventh) thanks 'to the power of the Puja of Vishnu, Bali is remembered as their Indra [i.e. King of the devas]' (Part 1: 40.30)
- 'Bali' is mentioned as a food offering (rice ball) in sacrifices several times throughout (e.g. Part 2: 51.82b-83 and Part 3: 70.24-27)
- Vamana is stated to have been 'installed by all the Devas' at Kotitirtha (Part 5: 65.29b-30a)

=== Padma Purana ===
Padma	References	Notes
Padma	Part 1: 30; Part 2: 38 (legend of Ram and an image of Vamana), 41.33b-35, 41.178, 75.90; Part 3: 19.29, 19.60-71, 32.32-54, 66.129-151a, 75.1-6, 76.25-33, 87.10-24; Part 4: 98.52-78; Part 5: --; Part 6: 78.16b-43; Part 7: 45.49-52, 53.2-16, 66.44-54, 71.23-29a, 71.199-212, 78.16.29, 78.44; Part 8: 120.51b-73, 133.2-12, 138.1-15, 160; Part 9: 218.10-16, 228.14-18, 229.40-44, 240; Part 10: 6.175-190, 11.25-30;	

Bhishma said: Having reached the sacrificial mountain the powerful Vishnu planted his foot (-steps) there. What is the purpose of this line of the foot (-steps) which the lord of lords planted?... O great sage [Pulastya], tell me which demon he subdued after having planted his foot (-steps) there. The residence of Vishnu is in heaven, the great-souled one lives in Vaikuntha. How is it that he planted his foot (-step) in the human world?...

Tell me in detail, O Brahman, how (is it that the lord), leaving these worlds, planted his two foot-steps on the earth and (how is it that he) planted his foot steps on the sacrificial mountain in this place, viz. Pushkaram, which is sacred to Brahma.

— Padma Purana (translated by N.A. Deshpande, 1988), Part 1, Chapter 30 ('Origin of Visnu's Steps'), Verses 1-8

In the Padma Purana, two accounts of the legend of Vamana are given.

==== First Account ====
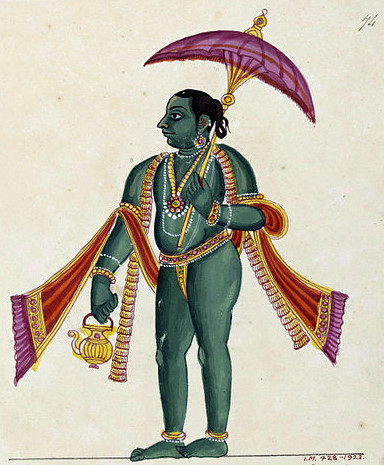
Vamana.

The first is related by the sage Pulastya to Bhishma (Part 1: chapter 30), which took place 'formerly in the Satya Yuga'. Similar to the legend of Vritra in the Bhagavata Puran, Baskali (i.e. Bali) conquers the devas led by Indra after attaining the boon of invincibility from Brahma, forcing them to ultimately seek Vishnu for refuge. Vishnu agrees to help, and Aditi (Wife Of Kashyapa) is pregnant for 1,000 divine years with the Vamana incarnation. It is noted that Aditi 'entertained a malicious design' to destroy the demons during her pregnancy.

At 'the time as ordained, the god, the lord of lords (i.e. Visnu), kind to all beings, of pure and scanty hair, having the beauty of the moon, the conch and the (sun-) rise, became (i.e. was born as) Aditi's son'. Vamana later travels with Indra to the city of Baskali to request three steps of land. To the amazement of Indra, in the city there 'was no religious merit, no lore, no architecture, no art that did not exist (i.e. that was not found)', and even the Vedas were being recited by 'virtuous demons'. Baskali himself 'was conversant with righteousness, was grateful, truth-speaking, and had his senses controlled'.

Delighted, Baskali compares seeing Indra to sacrifices like the Agnistoma and Rajasuya. Indra praises Baskali and requests three steps of land for the dwarf-brahmin to have a fire-sanctuary to make sacrifices. Baskali praises and surrenders to Vamana as Vishnu who 'has performed a hundred sacrifices endowed with excellent sacrificial fees', adding that Vishnu 'killed Vrtra Namuci' (a legend also related to the development of the Narasimha incarnation). Although advised by Sukra to gift nothing to Vamana or else face total destruction, Baskali considers himself lucky to be able to surrender to Vishnu and wants to give everything. Indra repeats that only three steps of land are requested, and 'Baskali then gave (the piece of land measured by) three (foot-) steps to the dwarf, after (pouring) water (on his hand), saying 'Let Hari himself be pleased with me'.

The first step of Vamana is on the sun, the second is on Dhruva (the polar star), and the third reaches outside the universe. Water rushing in through the crack in the edge of the universe caused by the tip of Vishnu's toe becomes the river Visnupadi (i.e. the Ganges), an auspicious and holy river. Vishnu offers Baskali a boon, and is requested only for increased devotion and a death at His hands in order to enter the realm even 'inaccessible to the ascetics'. Vishnu agrees and promises to kill Baskali when they incarnate and battle as Varaha and Hiranyaksha, respectively. Otherwise, after being deposed, 'Baskali lived happily in the netherworld [while] Indra also protected the three worlds'.

==== Second account and other details ====
Then at the end of a thousand years Aditi gave birth to Vamana, Vishnu, Acyuta, Hari, the lord, who was the great lord of all the worlds, who had Srivatsa and Kaustubha on his chest, whose lustre was like that of the full moon, who was handsome, whose eyes were like lotuses, whose body was very short... who could be known by means of the Vedas and Vedangas, who was marked with such signs as a girdle, a (piece of) deer-hide, and a staff. Seeing him of a great vigor, all deities led by Indra. along with great sages, praised and saluted him.

— Padma Purana (translated by N.A. Deshpande, 1988), Part 9, Chapter 240 ('Visnu incarnates as Vamana'), Verses 1-5a

The second account, narrated by Mahadeva (i.e. Shiva), is much shorter and more typical in nature. In this, Vamana is implored by the devas to visit the sacrifice of Bali to request the three worlds from him. Vamana, this time alone without Indra, is greeted and worshipped by Bali, explains the merit of donating land, and requests three steps, which is granted despite the protests of Sukra. Vamana then 'abandoned his dwarfish form... extending up to fifty crores (of yojanas) he seized the earth along with the seas and mountains, along with the oceans, islands, devas, demons and human beings'. As Vishnu places his second and third steps, creating the sacred Ganges in the process, Bali is granted the ability to see his universal 'Janardana-form' (similar to that witnessed by Arjun in the Bhagavad Gita). Other details include:

- The 'three objects' (Trivarga) of worldly existence specified by Baskali (i.e. Bali) are Dharma, Artha, and Kama (Part 1: 30.94)
- 'Vamana' is listed as one of the hundred names of Vishnu (Part 3: 87.10-24)
- Vamana 'removed, with the auspicious glances, the sin of Bali... lord Vamana, shining in the group of Brahmanas at the head of the sacrifice, adorned with Brahmanic glory (Part 4: 98.52-78)
- Vamana should be worshipped - amongst other devas - during Amalaki Ekadasi (Part 7: 45.49-52)
- In the Hymn called 'Apamarjana', Vamana is assigned to 'the roots of the ears' (Part 7: 78.16.29)
- The 'round and small' salagrama stone is called 'Vamana' (Part 8: 120.51b-73)
- Vishnu as Vamana is stated to dwell in Holy places called Kanyakubja and Vamanatirtha (Part 8: 133.2-12 and 160)
- Reference is made to a sage called Vamana who, amongst others, served Shiva due to the grace of Ganesha (Part 8: 138.1-15)
- Vamana is listed in the Dashavatara, the ten principle incarnations of Vishnu (Part 7: 66.44-54, 71.23-29, and Part 9: 229.40-44)

=== Shiva Purana ===
Shiva	References	Notes
Shiva	Part 1: 51.14-15 (Bana, son of Bali); Part 2: Kumara-Khanda: 9.18; Yuddha-khanda: 16.7, 35.31, 51.14-15; Part 3: Satarudra-Samhita: 11.20; Uma-Samhita: 10.35-40, 10.45-46 (Bali as an offering or tribute); Part 4: Uma-Samhita: 48.44; Vayaviya-Samhita: 30.56-58, 31.134-136	

Formerly, multitudes of creatures moving about in the one vast ocean have been split by your lordship in the form of a Fish [Matsya] by binding them with your tail. You support the earth in the form of a Tortoise [Kurma]. You lifted it up in the form of a Boar [Varaha]. In the form of a Man-Lion [Narasimha] Hiranyaksipu has been killed [by you]. Again in the form of a Dwarf [Vamana], you had bound Bali. You are the origin of all living beings. You are the eternal lord.

— Shiva Purana (translated by J.L.Shastri, 1950), Part 3 (Satarudra Samhita), Chapter 11, Verses 18-20

It seems that the legend of Vamana is only briefly mentioned in the Shiva Purana. The translator, J.L.Shastri, notes in the fourth part (page 1659, footnote 93) that 'Patala is called Balisadman - the abode of Bali. According to a legend God Vishnu in the form of a Brahman dwarf craved from Bali the boon of three steps of ground and having obtained it stepped over heaven and earth in two strides but then out of respect to Bali's devotion and his grandson Prahlada's virtues, he stopped short and left to him Patala, the nether region'. However, Prahlada is actually the grandfather of Bali (being the son of Hiranyakashipu), not his grandson as incorrectly stated by Shastri. Other details include:

- Bali conquering the devas led by Indra is a prelude to the legend of the Kurma incarnation, where the Devas and Asuras form a pact to churn of the ocean of milk (Part 2: 15). Bali is present at the churning where a 'great battle for the possession of Amrta ensued between the devas and the Asuras', and after gaining possession of it, where Vishnu incarnates as Mohini to give the Amrita to the devas (Part 3: 22)
- Aniruddha (incarnation / grandson of Krishna) sneaks into the residence of Bana (son of Bali) to form an alliance with Usa (daughter of Bana; Part 2: 51–53). This legend is repeated in other Puranas such as the Srimad Bhagavatam.
- The eldest son of Bali, Bana 'became a devotee of Shiva. He was highly respected and intelligent' (Part 1: Rudra-Samhita: 51.14-15)
- There is a mountain called Vamana (Part 3: Uma Samhita: 18.47)
- Hiranyaksipu, Hiranyaksa, Virocana (Bali's father) 'and Bali worship Shiva every day' (Part 4: Kotirudra-Samhita 37.18); the exception is Prahlada (son of Hiranyaksipu, father of Virocana, and grandfather of Bali) who does not worship Shiva but instead worships Vishnu
- Vamana is listed in the Dashavatara, the ten principle incarnations of Vishnu (Part 4: Vayaviya-Samhita: 30.56-58 and 31.134-136)

=== Skanda Purana ===
Skanda	References	Notes
Skanda	Part 1: 8.90, 18–19; Part 2: 62.53; Part 3: Purvardha - 6.51b-53, 11.14; Part 4: Venkatacala Mahatmya - 20.77-82; Part 5: Purusottama-Ksetra Mahatmya - 37.12-17 (Bali as offering), 44.12; Part 6: Karttikamasa-Mahatmya - 9.49b-60; Part 7: Vaisakhamasa Mahatmya - 4.16, 18.21-23, 27.25-26; Part 8: Setu Mahatmya - 3.81-82, 10.50-51 (Bali as offering), 37.20, 46.36; Part 9: --; Part 10: Purvardha - 5.44, 21.12; Part 11: Uttarardha - 58.53, 58.158-164, 61.220, 82.111, 84.20; Part 12: Avantiksetra Mahatmya - 48.42-50, 63.1-8, 63.86, 63.238-270, 70.54-56; Part 13: Caturasiti-Linga Mahatmya - 26.40-44; Part 14: Reva Khanda - 48.15-24; Part 15: Reva Khanda - 149.7-15, 151.1-7, 230.31-40; Part 16: Nagara Khanda - 24.5-17, 51.44; Part 17: --; Part 18: Nagara Khanda - 244.7, 273.4-6; Part 19: Prabhasa-Kestra-Mahatmya - 19.96-97, 81.18, 81.25, 83.54-56 (Bali as oblation), 114; Part 20: Prabhasa Khanda - 167.66-68	Bali is mentioned as offerings / oblations throughout part 9 (e.g. 6.17-19 and 6.44).

When he obstructed the flow of water at the time of the gift of the earth by Bali (to Vamana), Bhargava (i.e. Sukra) lost his eye on being pricked with the tip of the Darbha grass held in his hand by Vishnu (i.e. Vamana). He went to Sonacala and performed a very difficult penance. With his soul purified, he regained his eye.

— Skanda Purana (Unknown translator, 1951), Part 3 (Purvardha), Chapter 6, Verses 51b-53

Notably, this above-quoted incident is not mentioned in either of the two legends of Vamana given in the Skanda Purana.

==== First account ====
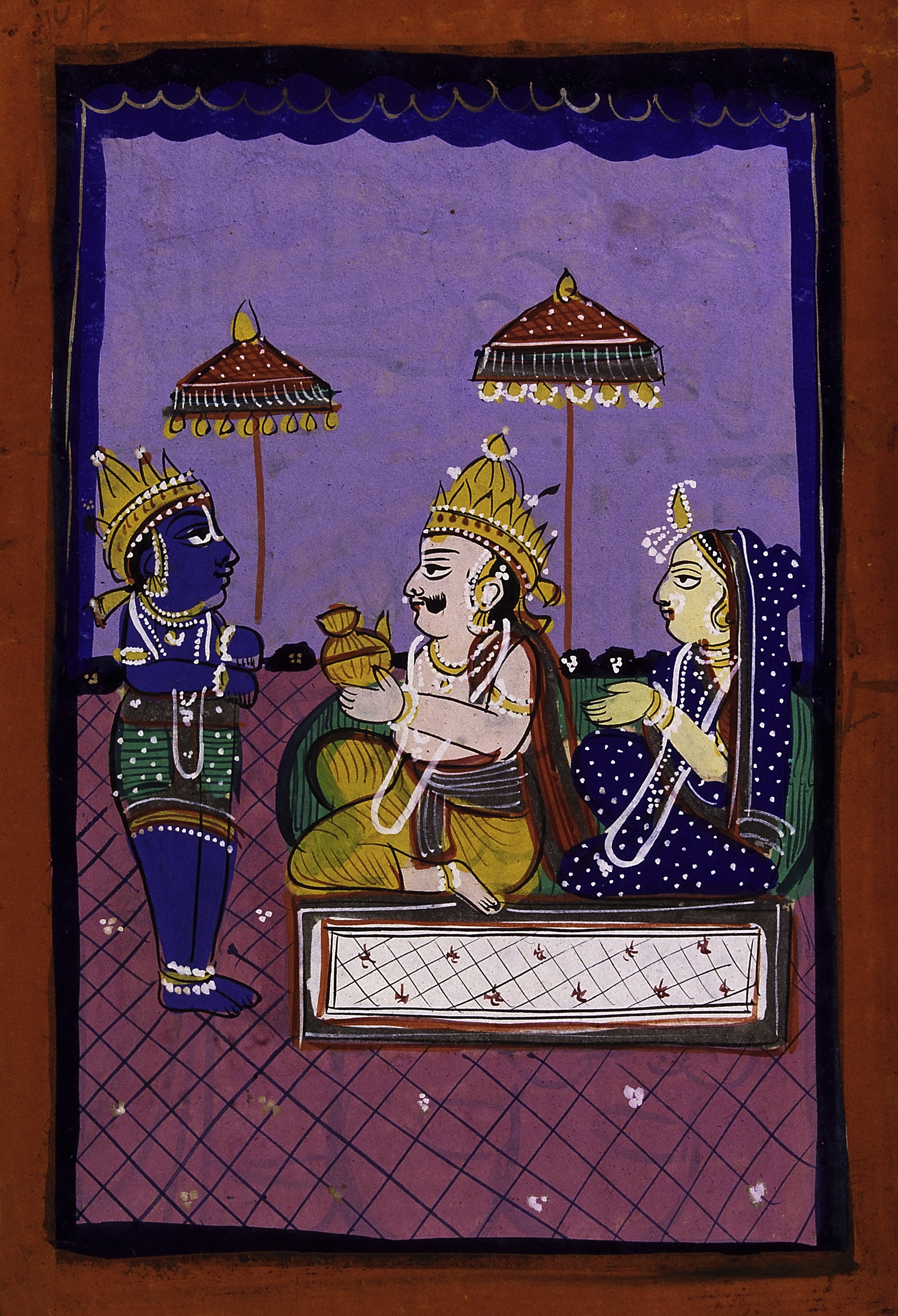
Vamana, Bali, and Vindhyabali.

In the first account (part 1, chapters 18–19), after being defeated by the Daityas (led by Bali), the shamed Suras (led by Indra) disguise themselves as different animals and go to the hermitage of Kashyapa and Aditi for refuge. Aditi wishes to help the Suras, so on the advice of Kashyapa, she performs the Ekabhakta rite for Vishnu for a year (details and instructions are provided, including the most auspicious timings and star constellations). Pleased with Aditi's holy penance, Janardana (Vishnu), on 'the Dvadasi day which coincided with [the] Sravana constellation [appeared in] the form of a Brahmacarin (religious student). He was two-armed and had lotus-like eyes. He had the colour of the flower of Atasi (Hemp). He was adorned with a garland of sylvan flowers'.

Pondering how to defeat the Daityas, Vamana first orders his gada (mace) to kill Bali, but it replies that this is impossible as Bali is 'a great Brahmanya (well-versed in the Vedas, friendly and hospitable to Brahmanas)'. His discus and Sarnga bow give the same reply when ordered to kill Bali, too: 'Just as you are Brahmanya, O Vishnu, so is this great Daitya [called Bali] also'. Meanwhile, the Daityas conquer heaven (abandoned by the Suras) and install Bali on Indra's throne. Bali's previous life as a sinful gambler is recounted, before it is revealed Aditi completed her Vrata (vow) - upon which Vamana, 'Aditi's son in the form of a great religious student' appeared - just before Bali's 100th horse-sacrifice.

At the sacred thread ceremony performed by Kashyapa for Vamana, Brahma gives the sacred thread, Soma gives the staff, the Earth gives two sandals, and Bhavani gives alms. Also given a girdle and deer-hide by unknown parties, Vamana proceeds to Bali's next sacrifice. Although Bali is willing to give the Brahmin the whole earth, Vamana requests only three steps of land, before Sukra warns Bali that the religious student ('Batu') is Vishnu in disguise, and in relation to the Kurma incarnation, that Vishnu had previously incarnated as Mohini to take the Amrita away from the Daityas to give to the Suras (Chapter 18).

In the next chapter, Bali states that he intends to give whatever is asked as 'Lord Hari, the soul of everyone has come here out of sympathy for me, in order to redeem me'. Sukra curses Bali for ignoring his advice and retreats to a Hermitage. There is no mention of Sukra attempting to block the offering or losing his eye. Vamana takes two steps, the first covering the earth and the second all existence; the water used by Brahma to wash the foot of Vishnu that took the second step produces the Ganges. Vamana returns to His original size, and through Garuda, admonishes and binds Bali for only gifting two steps, not three as promised (since all existence had been covered in only two). Vindhyavali, Bali's wife, sees through this ruse and offers the heads of Bali, her son Bana, and herself for Vishnu to step on. Delighted, Vishnu releases Bali from his bonds, instructs Bali to rule in Sutala, and offers a boon. Bali states 'I do not wish for anything except your lotus-like feet, O Lord'. Vishnu promises to be Bali's gatekeeper forever, and all 'the beggars and mendicants of the three worlds went to Bali. Visnu who stood at the entrance to his abode, granted to them whatever they desired to get'. The account then ends with a eulogy to Shiva, by whose favour 'that Bali became thus' (i.e. happy and blessed; Chapter 19).

==== Second account and other details ====
In the second account (part 12, chapter 63, verse 237 onward), after the request of the devas granted a boon by Vishnu, Vamana is born 'as the delighter of Aditi' some time later. At this time Bali was performing 'a hundred horse sacrifices with a desire to take away the kingdom of Indra'. Vamana, singing 'the Mantras of all the four Vedas', arrives at Bali's sacrifice officiated by figures such as Kashyapa and Bhrgu. Announced by the doorkeepers, Vamana is taken by Bali to the centre of the hall, and asked His reason for coming as well as whatever He may desire.

Vamana requests three steps of land. Bali offers much more, but Vamana repeats he wishes for three steps of land. Against the advice of Bhrgu (Sukra in the first account), this is granted by Bali, and 'Hari immediately occupied the cosmos. The entire region of [the] earth including mountains, forests and jungles was covered by two and a half [footsteps]'. Having conquered the Asuras, Vamana gives the three worlds back to Satakratu (Indra) and returns to earth. The remainder of the chapter concerns the merits of the Vamana Tirtha (holy site) related to this legend. Other details include:

- The city of Bali in Patala (i.e. the netherworld) is called Bhogavati (Part 3: Purvardha: 11.14)
- The 12-month Jyesthapancaka Vrata to Vishnu is described in detail, including mention of Vamana (Part 5: 44.12)
- Bali requests from Vamana that if 'people offer lamps to Naraka [Hell] on the fourteenth day [of Dipavali, the festival of lights], all their forefathers shall cease to be in Naraka' (Part 6: Karttikamasa-Mahatmya - 9.49b-60)
- In the procedure for Puja Mandala Construction for Vishnu worship, Vamana, along with the Gautama Buddha, should be installed at 'the front of the eastern filament... both of them dark as a cloud (in complexion), compassionate, quiescent, celibate, wearing sacred thread and white garments, holding a full bloomed lotus in the right hand, [and] the left hand indicating Abhaya (protection from fear) by its position' (Part 7: Vaisakhamasa Mahatmya: 27.25-26)
- When the murti of Vamana is installed in the house 'he makes people prosperous' (Part 11: Uttarardha: 61.220)
- Vamana is listed in the Dashavatara, the ten principle incarnations of Vishnu (Part 15: Reva Khanda: 151.1-7)
- Bali is to take the position of Indra during the reign of the eighth Manu (Part 18: Nagara Khanda: 273.4-6)

=== Vamana Purana ===
Vamana	References	Notes
Vamana	Saromabatmya - 2-10; 48-52 and 62-66	

'O King, give me three strides for a fire sanctuary. Let gold, villages, jewels and such other things be given to those who desire them'. Bali said 'O Most exalted one, what shall you do with three steps? Please ask for a hundred or a thousand steps'. Sri Vamana said 'O Chief of demons, as far as soliciting is concerned, I shall be satisfied with this much. To other seekers you give valuable things according to their choice'.

— The Vamana Purana, (translated by A.S. Gupta, 1968), Saromabatmya, Chapter 10, Verses 44-45

There are two main accounts of the legend of Vamana in the Vamana Purana. At least 18 chapters relate directly to Vamana and events or characters relating to the legend. H.H. Wilson summarises the legend of Vamana in this Purana as 'the birth of Krishna as a dwarf, for the purpose of humiliating Bali by fraud, as he was invincible by force. The story is told as usual; but the scene is laid at Kurukshetra'. This somewhat curt summation is fundamentally inaccurate and misleading since Bali is neither humiliated nor defrauded. As a general rule, Bali is a noble-souled and religious character fully aware of exactly who Vamana is and who knowingly grants three footsteps of land in spite of being warned of the consequences. This is the case in both accounts contained in the Vamana Purana, where far from being 'humiliated', Bali is installed as ruler of the netherworlds and is promised the post of Indra (i.e. King of the devas).

==== First account ====
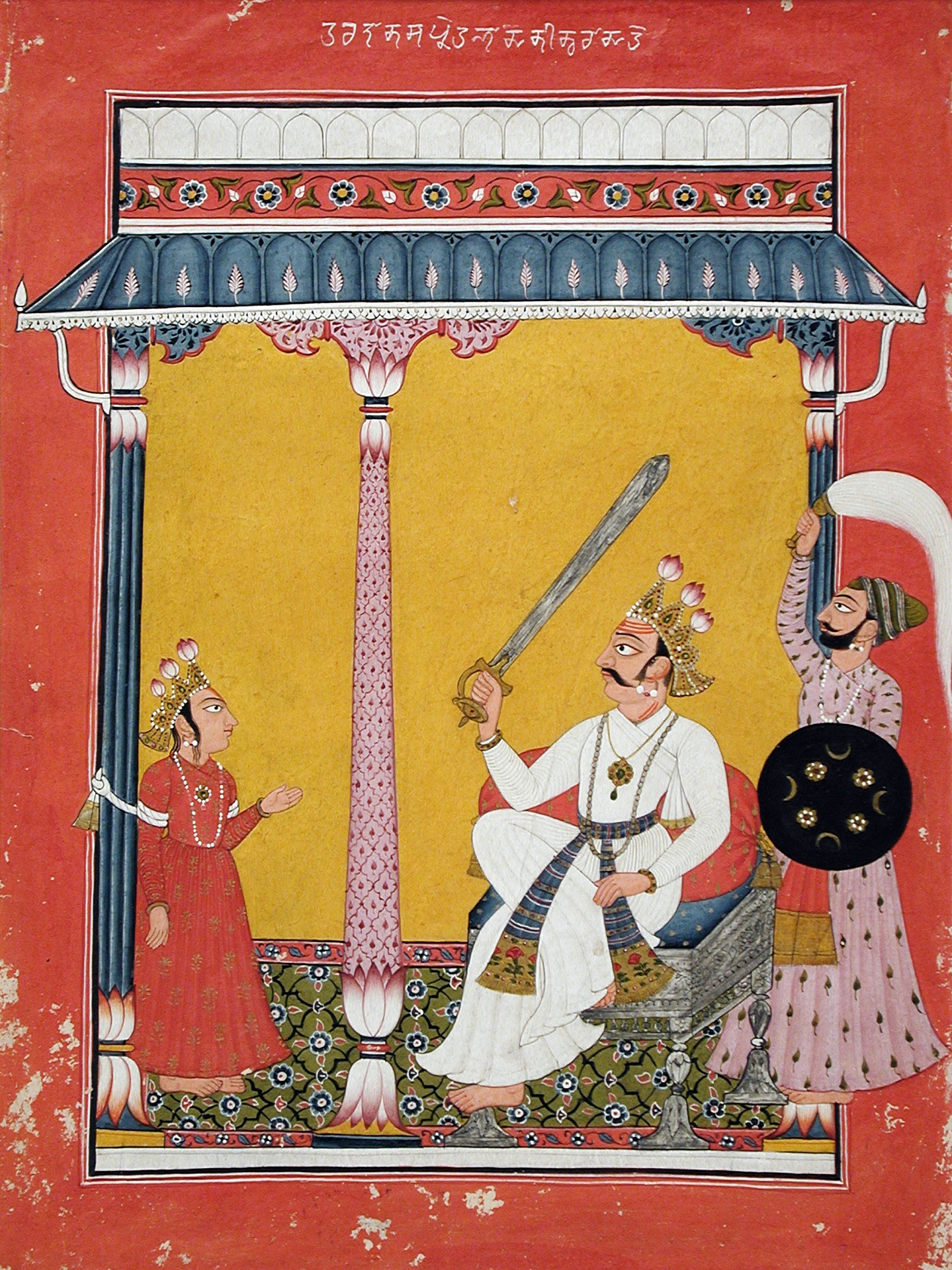
Prahlada and his father, Hiranyakasipu.

The first account is remarkably similar to that of the Matsya Purana (see above), and consists of 9 chapters (Saromabatmya: 2-10). It begins with the coronation of Bali as the King after defeating Indra. Noble and religious, Bali is congratulated for his victory and blessed by Sri (2). Meanwhile, Indra returns to his mother, Aditi, who states Bali can only be defeated by Vishnu. Aditi and the devas go to Kashyapa, 'the creator of beings, the Supreme Master of the entire progeny' who then takes them to Brahmaloka, the celestial abode of Brahma (3).

Brahma informs the devas that the three worlds will be delivered by 'Him who is the Lord of all the worlds, the eternal master of the universe, and the First born they call the Primordial First Deity. Even the devas do not know who the Great One is'. From there the devas travel to 'the northern bank of the Ksiroda Ocean, in the northern direction, where the Creator of the universe is present... the region known as Amrta'. There, knowing 'Lord Narayana, the thousand-eyed god' could only be realised through spiritual union, practiced holy vows and recited the Vedas for 1,000 years (4). Kashyapa also eulogises Vishnu by reciting many of His names, including 'Devadeva' ('God of devas') and 'Prasitara' ('the Eater of the oblation at the sacrifice') and states the importance of sacrifice (5).

Narayana agrees to the request of Kashyapa to 'be born as the younger brother of Indra, the promoter of the happiness of the relatives, and the dear son of Aditi'. Returning to the Hermitage of Kashyapa, Aditi then performs penances for 10,000 years (6). Pleased with her penance Vishnu appears, agrees to Aditi's wish to restore her son Indra to power, and becomes conceived in the womb (7). After the demons lose their lustre, Bali enquiries from his grandfather and Devotee of Vishnu, Prahlada, what the reason is. Meditating on Hari, Prahlada has a vision of Vamana and informs Bali, who scoffs and is consequently cursed as for his disrespect towards 'the all-pervasive, supreme spirit' (8). Bali apologises, is forgiven by Prahlada, and accepts he will lose his kingdom as a result of the curse. Meanwhile, Vamana is born to Aditi after 10 months of pregnancy. Brahma performs the Jatakarma ceremony and other rites before gifting a black deer skin, Brhaspati the sacred thread, Marici the Asadha staff, Vasistha a Kamandalu, Angiras a silken cloth, and so on. The dwarf then proceeds slowly to the sacrifice of Bali, His footsteps leaving hollows in the earth (9).

Bali is warned by Sukra about the arrival of Vamana, and advised to refuse any request made. Bali responds that he could not refuse the Lord of Sacrifices even if he wanted to, and considers himself very fortunate the Lord is arriving to his Yajna personally. Bali offers Vamana 'a gift of anything that belongs to me' and Vishnu requests 'three strides for a Fire Sanctuary [Altar]'. Bali agrees and as 'soon as water fell in his palm the Dwarf assumed non-dwarfish dimensions and showed instantly his form, comprehending all devas'. In three steps Vamana regains the three worlds which are returned to Indra, while Bali is promised to become Indra on 'the expiry of the Vaivasvata period' (i.e. end of the rule of the seventh Manu); until then, he is to rule in Sutala, 'crowded with hundreds of palaces and provided with comforts necessary for devas'. The remainder of the chapter concerns the importance of sacrifices, and the merits achieved by Bali though improper practices of others, such as 'sacrifices performed without faith' (10).

==== Second account ====
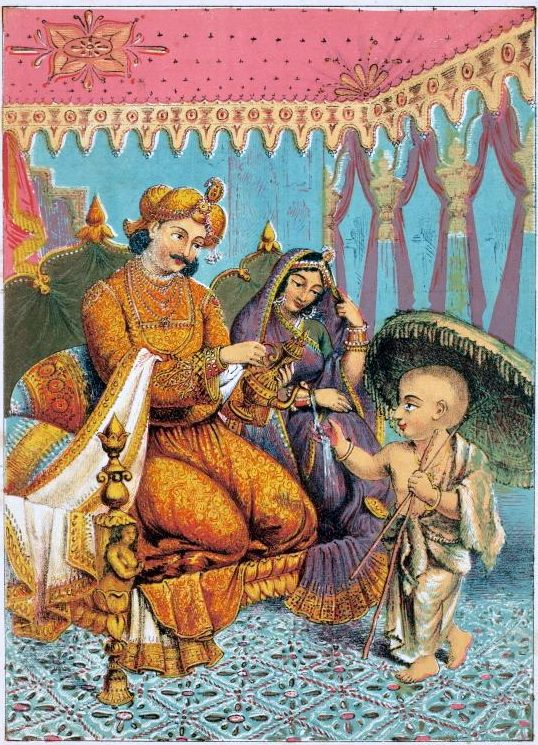
Vamana with Bali.

The second account - excluding chapters not directly related to the legend, such as Bali conquering the devas beforehand and the pilgrimage of Prahlada after cursing Bali - consists of at least 5 chapters (Saromabatmya: 50–51, 62, and 64–65). In this, Indra travels to Brahmaloka to confer with Brahma and Kashyapa, where he is told that he lost his Kingdom due to his sin of attempting to destroy the fetus of Diti (saved by Vishnu), another wife of Kashyapa and mother of the Daityas. Indra performs penances, of which he tells his mother, Aditi. Aditi in turn performs penances, and pleased, Vishnu agrees to be born as her son (i.e. Vamana) to restore Indra to power (50). Similar the first account, Bali is warned about the birth of Vamana and cursed after failing to take the threat seriously, albeit this time by his grandfather Prahlada (not Sukra), who then goes on a pilgrimage (51).

Vamana is born, and eulogised by Brahma who performs the Upanayana and Jatakarma ceremonies and others. Pulaha gives the sacred thread to Vamana, Pulastya two white garments, Agastya a deer skin, Bharadvaja a girdle, Marici a staff, Vasistha (son of Varuna) rosary beads, Angiras a broom of Kusa grass, King Raghu an umbrella, Nrga a pair of shoes, Brhaspati a water-jar, and so on. Vamana states 'I will go to Kuruksetra which confers great prosperity. There the sacred Asvamedha Sacrifice of the king of demons [Bali] is going on' (62).

Sukra advises Bali not to give anything to Vamana. This advice is rejected by Bali, who relates the story of Nisakara 'the son of Kosakara, which took place on the Malaya Mountain in olden days'. It is similar to the legend of Bharat, insofar as it concerns a person that having remembered their previous births, pretended to be mentally-handicapped, and suffered mistreatment by others as a result, in order to 'no longer commit terrible sins with my mind, actions and speech' (64). Vamana arrives at the sacrifice of Bali and requests three steps of land. Bali offers much more but Vamana again repeats 'Give me three steps; I do ask for this much only'. Bali agrees, and just 'as the water (of the pitcher) fell on the hand (of Vishnu) he assumed a divine, multifarious, world-embracing form for the purpose of pervading the three worlds'. In two steps, Vamana covers all existence and creates the Ganges. Vamana then tells Bali he must 'supply my (remaining) step or accept captivity'. Bali's son, Bana, sees through the ruse and points out Vishnu could traverse all of existence in a single step despite being in the small form of a dwarf.

Vishnu responds that His three steps were also for the benefit of Bali, and to the King directly, says, 'O King, till my honorarium is paid, you go and live free from diseases in the subterranean region called Sutala (good-surfaced) which is highly beneficial'. As in the first account, Vishnu also states that improper sacrifices will also benefit Bali while resident in the netherworld, in addition to other sacred rituals such as Dvara-pratipada. Then, 'having restored heaven to Indra, and enabling the devas to enjoy their shares in sacrifices, the omnipotent Lord of the universe disappeared' (65).

=== Varaha Purana ===
Varaha	References	Notes
Varaha	Part 1: 1.11, 4.2-3, 7.32, 8.43, 15.14, 43.2-7, 48.18-22, 55.37, 113.25, 113.42; Part 2: 160.40, 166.25, 174.53-54, 174.63, 174.76-83, 210.64, 211.69	

May the short Brahmacarin with staff and deer-skin who changed into a measureless huge body with yogic power, transcended the earth and made the sacrifice of Bali ineffective, purify us.

— Varaha Purana (Unknown translator, 1960), Part 1, Chapter 15, Verse 14

In the Varaha Purana, it seems that the legend of Vamana is only briefly mentioned, as quoted above. Other details include:

- Vamana is one of the 10 primary incarnations (Dashavatar) of Vishnu (Part 1: 4.2-3, 113.42 and Part 2: 211.69)
- In 'the month of Caitra (Mesa), Visnu should be worshipped on Dvadasi day after due fasting. The feet should be worshipped as Vamana' (Part 1: 43.1-2)
- Worship of Vamana removes 'all stupefaction' (Part 1: 48.18)
- It is said that the 'only means for redemption for those who are ignorant and indifferent to dharma and do not have compassion or give gifts, is to perform worship and sacrifice to Lord Vamana at the confluence at Mathura when the star Sravana is in combination with Dvadasi in the month of Bhadrapada' (Part 2: 174.53-54)

=== Vayu Purana ===
Vayu	References	Notes
Vayu	Part 1: 50.41 (city of Bali), 55.3, 55.7; Part 2: 5.133, 35.73, 35.77, 36.74-85, 37.26-32, 38.21-22, 46.29 (Bali as oblation);	

The third incarnation, that of Vamana, took place in the seventh Treta Yuga when all the three worlds had been overrun by Daityas and were ruled over by Bali... Assuming the form of a Brahmana on an auspicious occasion, he requested Bali: "O King, you are the lord of the three worlds. Everything is in you. It behoves you to grant me (the space covered by) three paces".

"I will give", promised the king Bali, the son of Virocana. On knowing that he was a Vamana (Dwarf), he was delighted mich. But, O excellent Brahmanas, that lord Vamana measured the entire universe, the Earth, the Heaven, and the Sky by means of three paces.

— Vayu Purana (Unknown translator, 1960), Part 2, Chapter 36, Verses 74-76

In the Vayu Purana, the legend of Vamana is briefly recounted in the second part (36.74-85), an excerpt of which is quoted above. A simplified version of the legend (in comparison to many others), after Vamana takes back the three worlds from the Asuras, 'he forced them to retreat to the bottom of the nether-world along with their sons and grandsons. Namuci, Sambara and Prahlada (were among them). The cruel Danavas were killed'. Bali is also stated to have been 'bound with great nooses along with his kinsmen, friends, and followers'.

The previous two incarnations of Vishnu prior to Vamana are stated to be Varaha and Narasimha. Notably, deviating from incarnations typically listed, the fourth listed (occurring in the tenth Treta Yuga) is Dattatreya, the fifth (fifteenth Treta Yuga) is Mandhatr, the sixth (nineteenth Treta Yuga) is Parashurama, and the seventh (twenty-fourth Treta Yuga) is Ram. Other incarnations following Rama have not been listed here. Other details include:

- The sons of Bali 'established the disciplines of four castes on this earth' (Part 2: 37.26-32)
- There are two different Balis. The first is Mahabali, the rival of Indra conquered by Vishnu/Vamana in three steps. The second is 'another East Indian King who being childless requested [progeny] thus to Dirghatamas' (Part 2: 37, footnote 1, page 796). The anonymous translator notes that the Vayu Puran seems to mix-up or confuse these two Balis in chapter 37 (i.e. Mahabali was not childless)
- It is stated that 'He who was formerly Bali, the son of Virocana, will become their [the devas] Indra' (Part 2: 38.21-22)
- It is stated that a son of Bali, Cakravarma, will be incarnated as Karn, one of the main villains of the Mahabharata (Part 2: 7.32)

=== Vishnu Purana ===
Vishnu	References	Notes
Vishnu	Book 1: 9; Book 2: --; Book 3: 1; Book 4: --; Book 5: 5; Book 6: --;	

For in like manner as the lord of the world, the god of gods, Janardana, descends amongst mankind (in various shapes), so does his coadjutrix Shri. Thus when Hari was born as a dwarf, the son of Aditi, Lakshmi appeared from a lotus (as Padma, or Kamala); when he was born as Ram, of the race of Bhrigu (or Parashuram), she was Dharani; when he was Raghava (Ramachandra), she was Sita; and when he was Krishna, she became Rukmini. In the other descents of Vishnu, she is his associate. If he takes a celestial form, she appears as divine; if a mortal, she becomes a mortal too, transforming her own person agreeably to whatever character it pleases Vishnu to put on.

— Vishnu Purana, (translated by H.H. Wilson, 1840), Book 3, Chapter 1

It seems that the legend of Vamana is only briefly mentioned in the Vishnu Purana. According to the notes of the translator, H.H. Wilson, 'Fuller details occur in the Bhagavata Purana, Kurma, Matsya, and Vamana Purana'. However, it is stated in the above quotation that Vamana had a wife called Padma or Kamala, an incarnation of His eternal consort Lakshmi. The only other mention of a wife is made in the Bhagavata Purana, whose name was Kirti (meaning 'Fame', see above).

== Sangam Literature ==
Several texts of the Tamil Sangam literature such as Mullaippāṭṭu and Perumpāṇāṟṟuppaṭai mention Vishnu's incarnation of Vamana, addressed as Trivikrama, referring to his act of spanning the Earth.

== Festivals ==
=== BaliPāḍyami ===
Balipaadyami or Balipratipada is an ancient festival observed during the five days of Diwali that amongst other things commemorates the Bali-Vamana legend. The legend signifies devotion, goodwill and generosity.

=== Onam ===
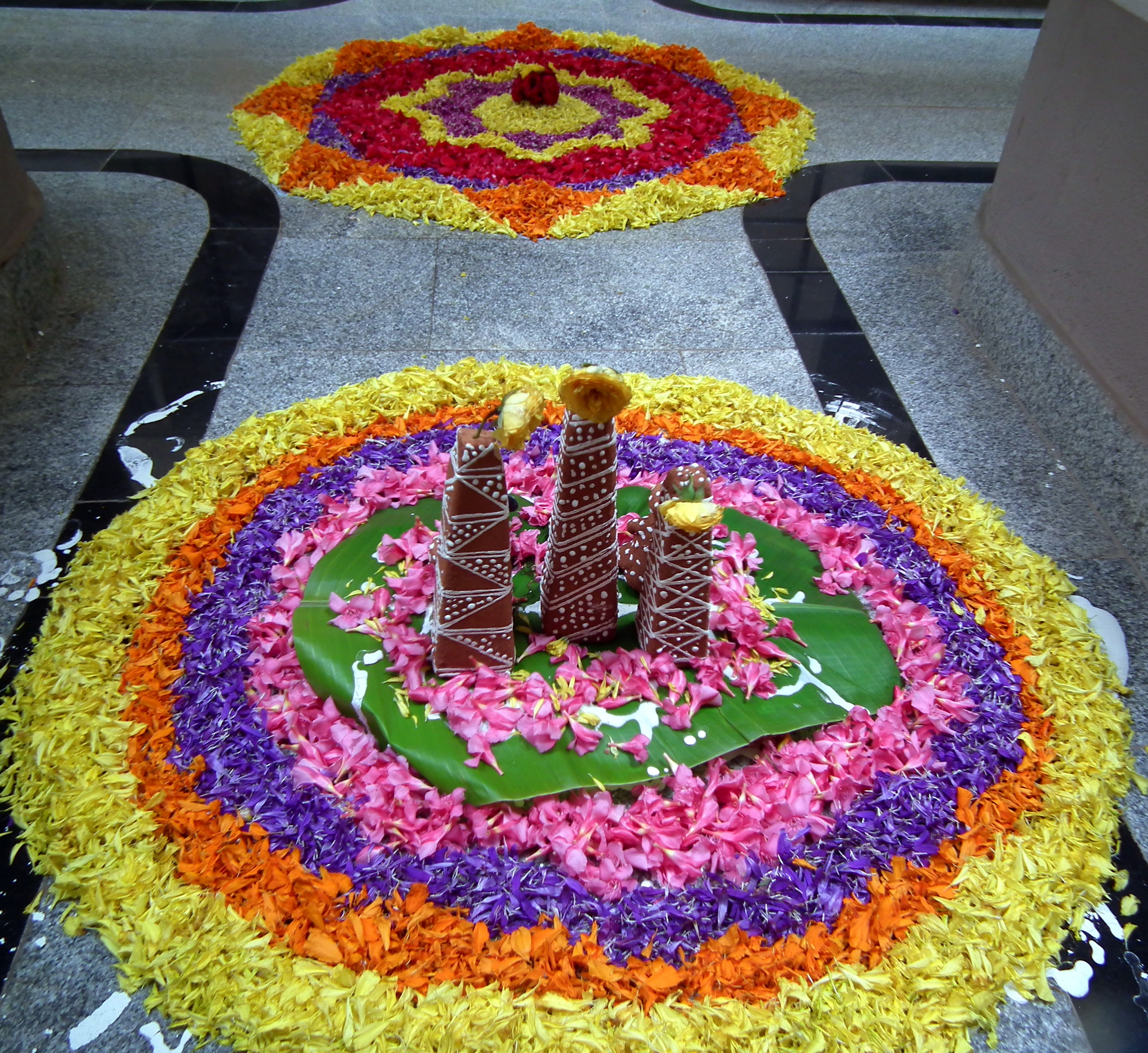
Thrikkakara Appan Onathappan idol (anicon of Vamana incarnation) inside Pookalam during Onam

In one version of the Vamana legend, when Mahabali offered himself for Vishnu's third step, it was an act of Mahabali's devotion. Vishnu granted him a boon. Mahabali chose to revisit earth, once every year, the lands and people he previously ruled. This revisit marks the festival of Onam, as reminder of the virtuous rule and his humility in keeping his promise before Vishnu.

A simpler form of this legend, one without Mahabali, is found in the Rigveda and the Vedic text Shatapatha Brahmana where a solar deity is described with powers of Vishnu. This story likely grew over time, and is in part allegorical, where Bali is a metaphor for thanksgiving offering after a bounty of rice harvest during monsoon, and Vishnu is the metaphor of the Kerala Sun and summer that precedes the Onam. The story of Mahabali is important to Onam in Kerala, but similar Mahabali legends are significant in the region of Balia in Uttar Pradesh, Bawan also in the same state, Bharuch in Gujarat, and Mahabaleshwar in Maharashtra. The story is significant not because Mahabali's rule ended, but it emphasizes the Hindu belief in cyclical nature of events, that no individual, no ruler and nothing lasts forever, except the virtues and self understanding that overcomes all sorrow.

== Iconography ==
Vamana iconography varies by region. Three icons are common, one shows his left foot raised above his knee, the second shows his foot above his navel, and the third shows it raised above the forehead. These icons respectively symbolize the three worlds – netherworld, earth and heaven – Vamana covered as Trivikrama.

== Temples ==
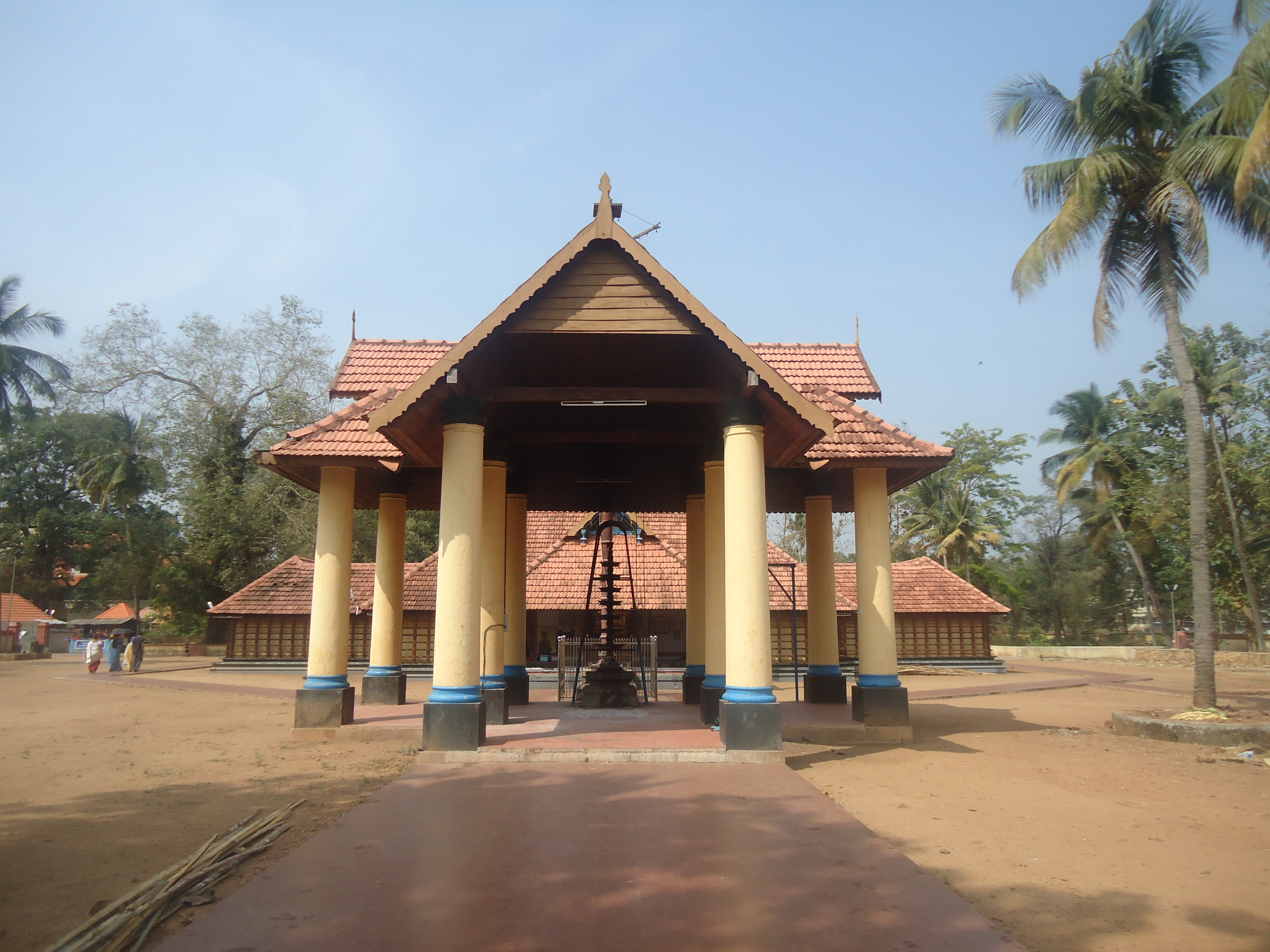
Thrikkakara Temple in Kerala

The Vamana iconography and images are found in many Vaishnava temples. Some Vamana temples include:

- Vamana temple at Marhia, Jabalpur (dated to 5th-century, Gupta Empire era)
- Vamana temple in Nagpur complex of Ramagiri Temples, Maharashtra (5th-century CE)
- Vamana along with other avatars of Vishnu, at the Dashavatara Temple, Deogarh, Jhansi (Uttar Pradesh, dated 500-500 CE)
- Thrikkakara Temple, Thrikkakkara, Cochin, Kerala
- Velloor Sree Vamana Swamy Temple, Kottayam, Kerala
- Mithranandapuram Vamanamoorthy Temple, Thrissur, Kerala
- Mathampilly Vamana Murthy Temple, Chelamattom, Ernakulam, Kerala
- Thrivikramamangalam Mahavishnu (Vamana) Temple, Thirumala, Thiruvananthapuram (Protected monument)
- Ulagalantha Perumal Temple, Kanchipuram in Kanchipuram
- Vamana Temple, Eastern Group of Temples, Khajuraho, Madhya Pradesh
- Ulagalantha Perumal Temple, Tirukoyilur in Tirukoilur, Viluppuram District, Tamil Nadu
- Kazheesirama Vinnagaram in Sirkazhi, Tamil Nadu
- In Jagannath Puri Temple the tower of the main sanctuary has three subsidiary shrines, Varaha on south, Narasingha on west and Vamana on north. The high relief Vamana Dev intricately describes the incident of Bali.
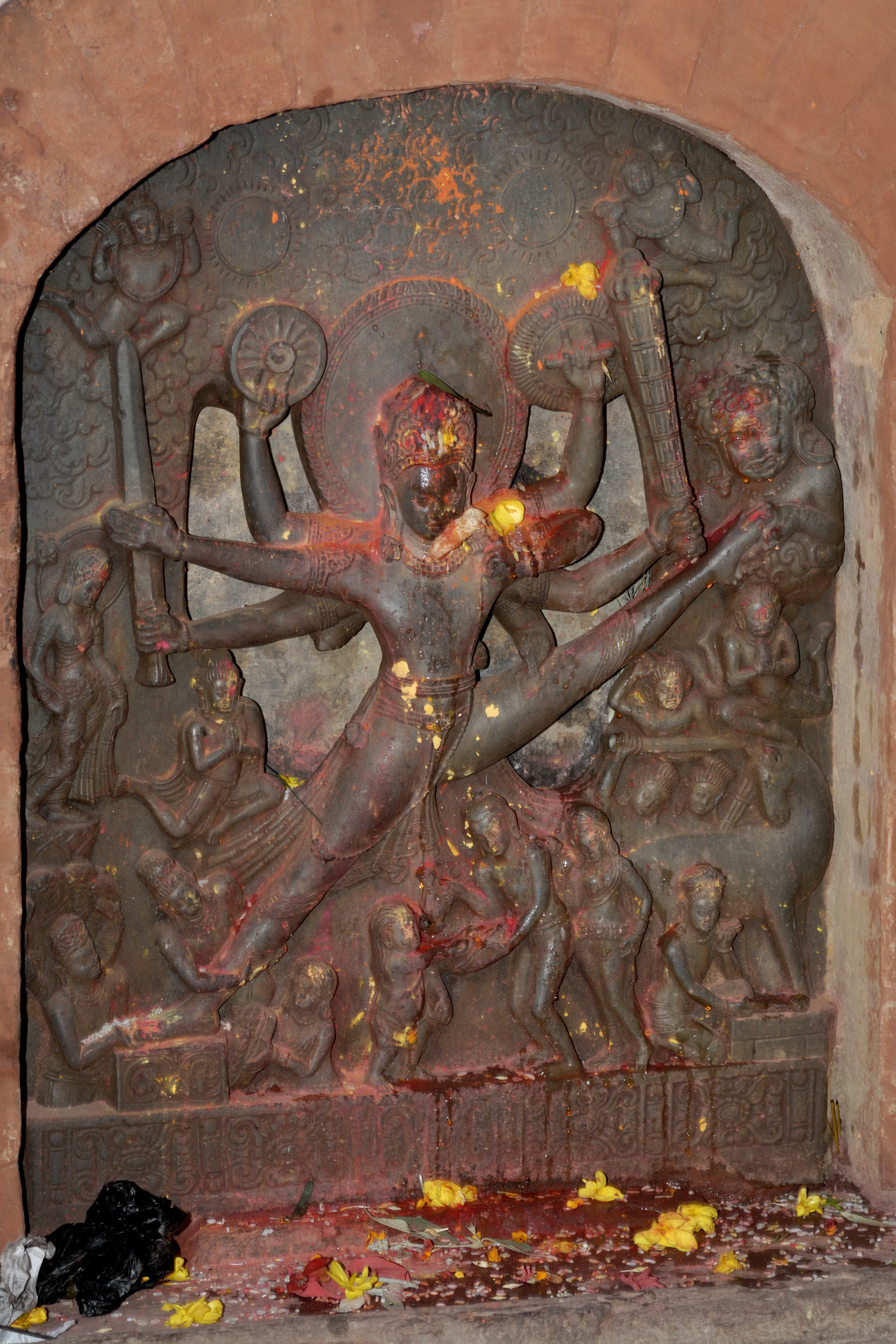
Vamana taking a giant step, Nepal

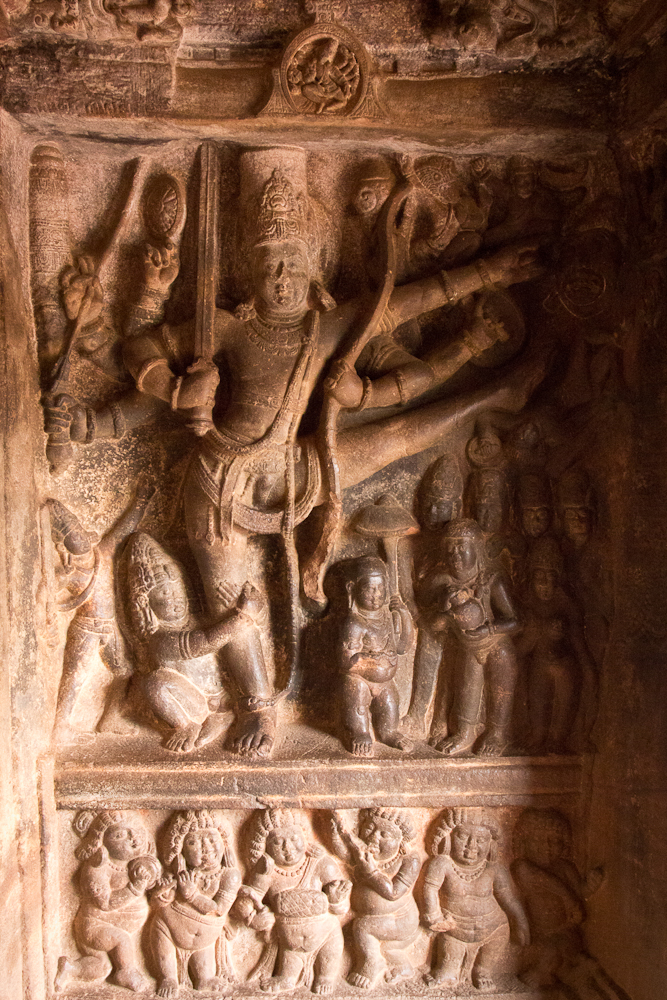
Vamana at the Badami cave temples, Karnataka

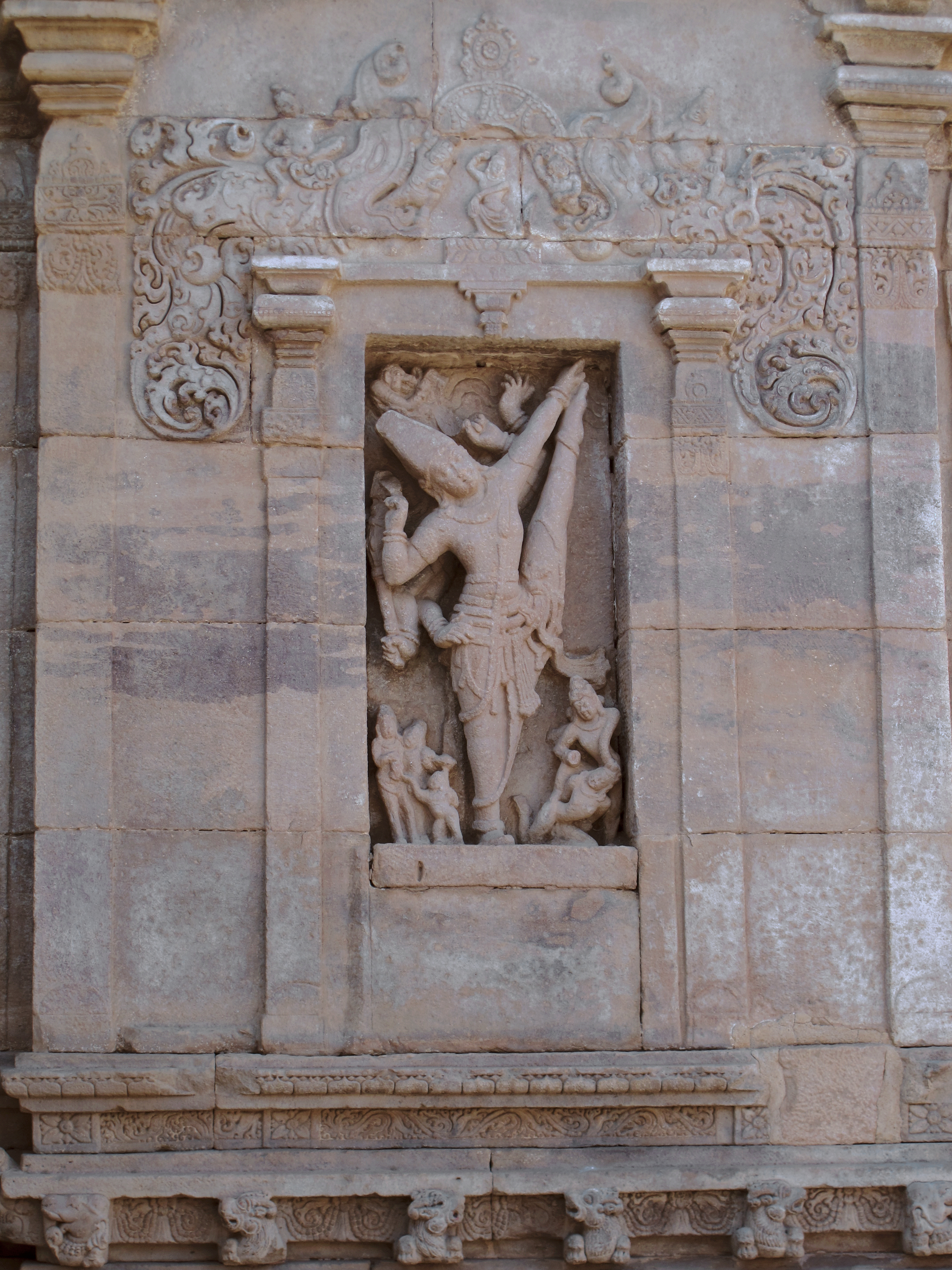
Vamana striding the heavens, Karnataka

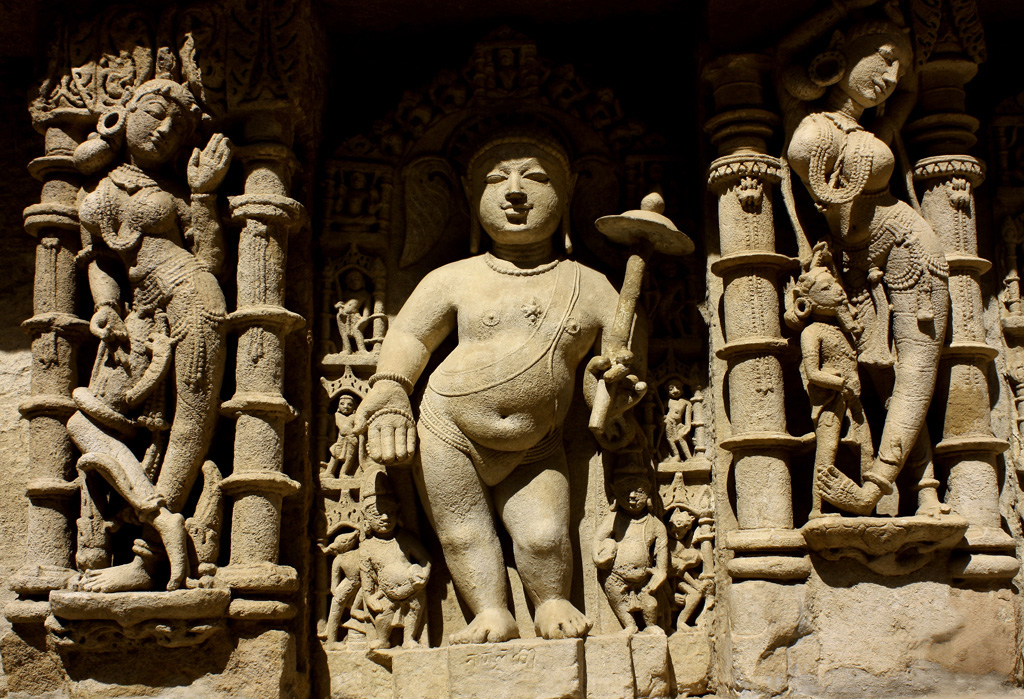
Dwarf Vamana avatar at Rani ki vav, Patan, Gujarat

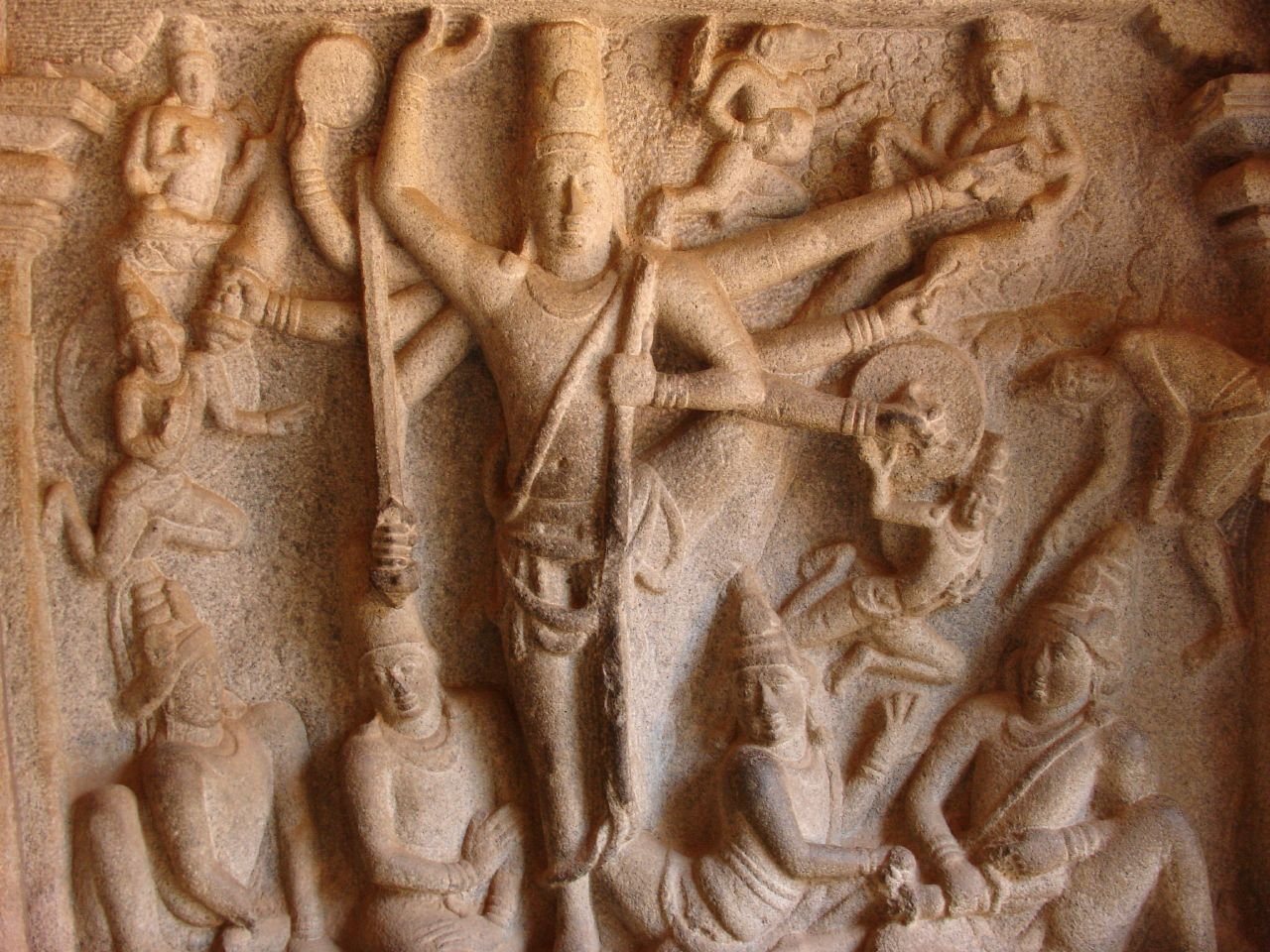
Vishnu as Trivikrama, Mamallapuram, Tamil Nadu

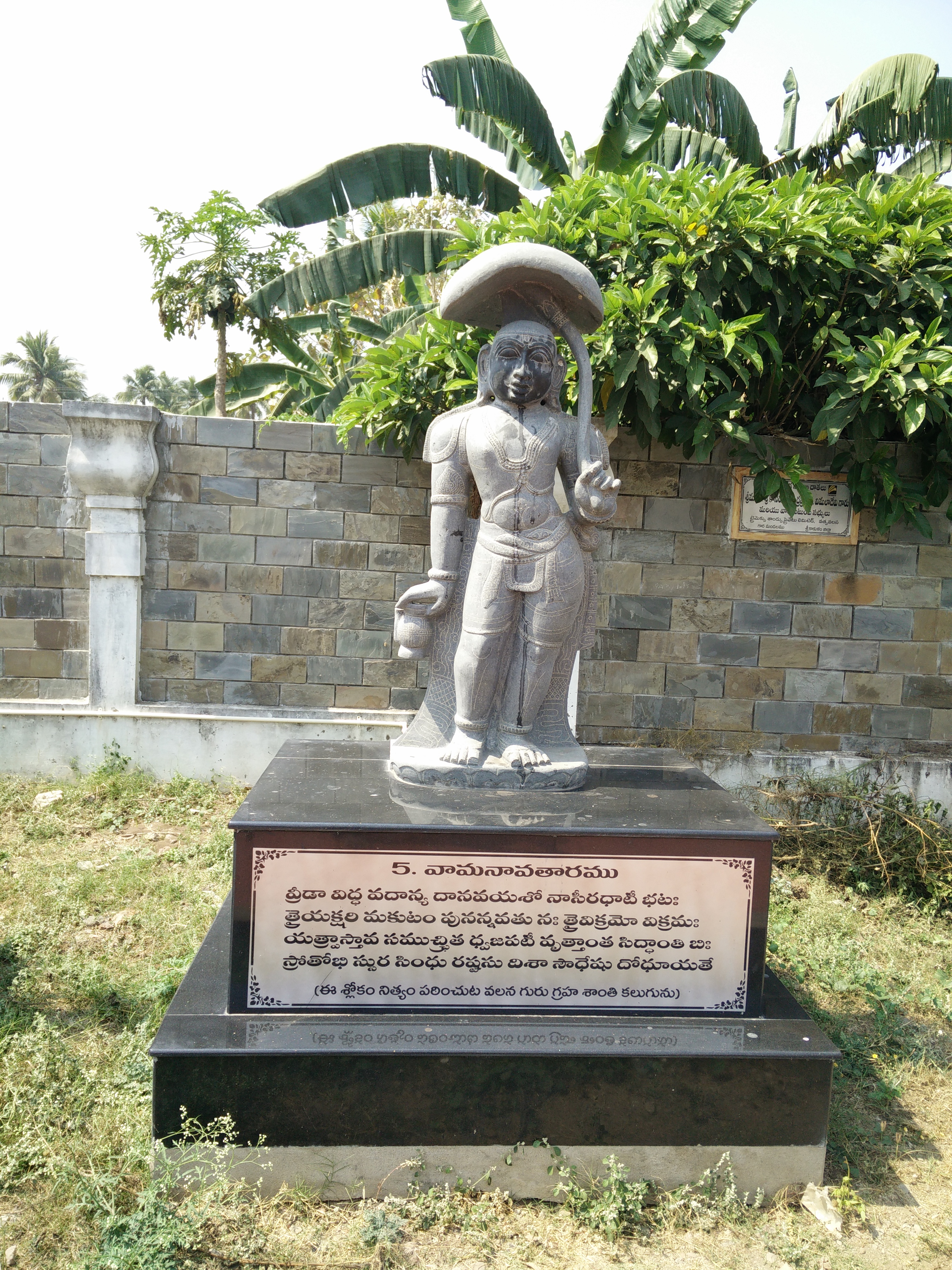
Dwarf Vamana at Srikurmam, Andhra Pradesh

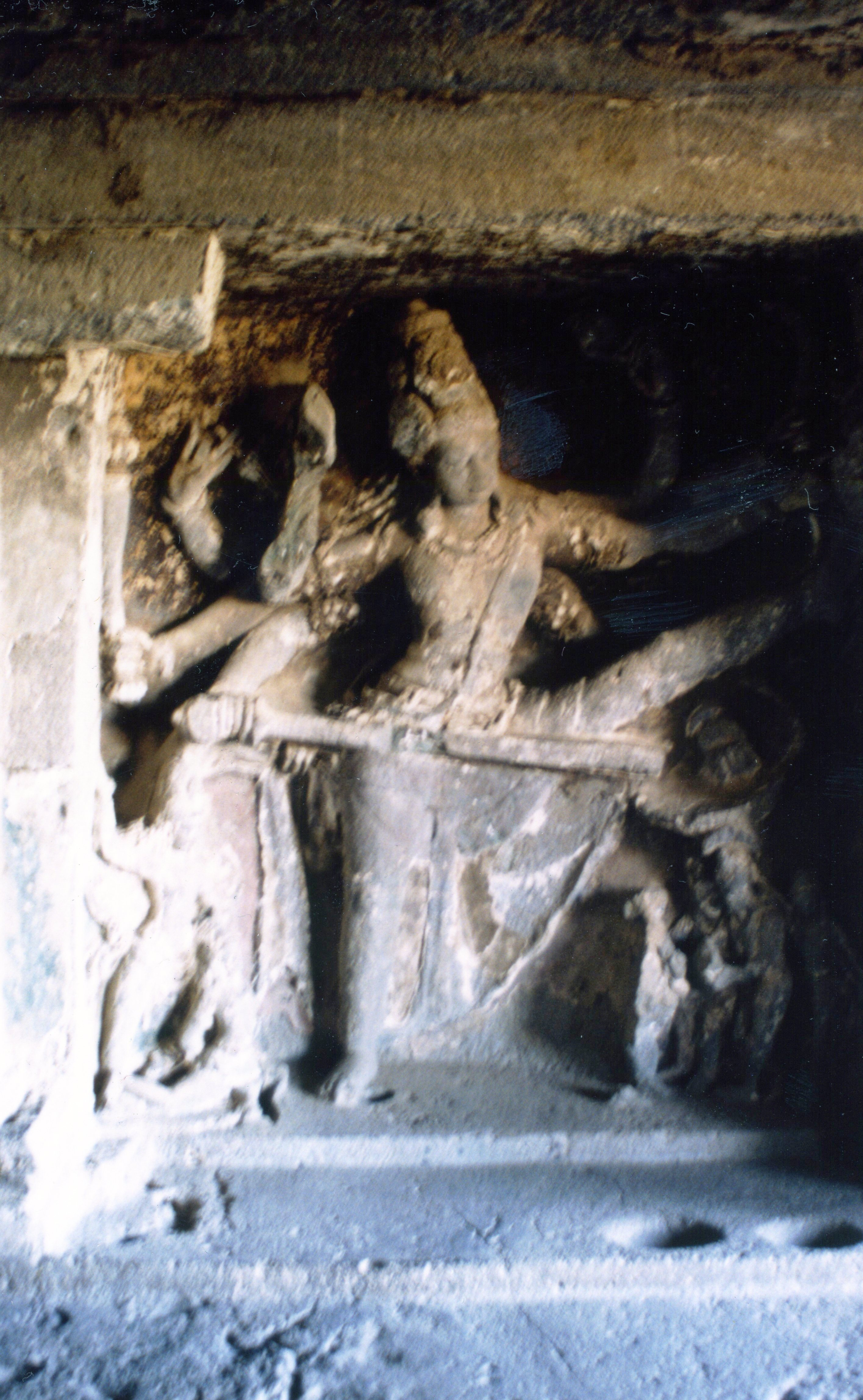
Vamana at Ellora Caves, Maharashtra

== See also ==
- Buddha
- Kalki
- Rama
- Vamadeva
- Varaha
- Vishnu
- Vishnu Purana

Regnal titles
Preceded by Narasimha	Dashavatara; Treta Yuga	Succeeded by Parashurama
