= Lineage of Mahabali =

Ancestral line in Hindu mythology

The lineage of Raja Bali (also known as Mahabali) represents one of the most significant ancestral lines in Hindu mythology, tracing the descent of the Daitya clan from the sage Kashyapa.

- Kashyapa + Diti
  - Hiranyakashipu (son)
    - Prahlada (grandson)
      - Virochana (great-grandson)
        - Mahabali (great-great-grandson)

== Descendants ==
According to the Bhagavata Purana and the Vishnu Purana, Mahabali had one hundred sons born to his wife, Vindhyavali. The eldest and most prominent among them was Banasura he was the successor of raja bali, a thousand-armed devotee of Shiva who ruled from the city of Sonitpur. The Puranic texts describe the other ninety-nine sons as being equally valiant, though they are often mentioned collectively rather than individually in major narratives. In the Narada Purana, this lineage is highlighted to illustrate the expansion of the Daitya influence across various realms.

== Lineage ==
According to Hindu mythology, Raja bali had one hundred sons born to his wife, specifically "The Bhagavata Purana (Canto 10, Chapter 62) explicitly records that Mahabali fathered one hundred sons, with the eldest being the thousand-armed Bana.

Despite the numerical specificity, the Puranic narrative does not provide an exhaustive list of names. following Banasura, prominent children of Mahabali are Kumbha, Nikumbha, Narakasura, Kuparna, Drishadva, Nila, Bhaskara, Balayogi/Balay and Dhanurdhara.

However, there no mention of his direct daughter in Hindu texts but his lineage continued through his granddaughter Usha, the daughter of Banasura, whose marriage to Aniruddha is a significant episode in the Bhagavata Purana.

== Community and lineage claims ==
In addition to the scriptural accounts, several historical dynasties and contemporary social groups in South Asia identify with the lineage of Mahabali. These claims often connect mythological ancestry with social identity and historical sovereignty.

=== Social and caste groups ===
- Northern communities: In Northern India, several communities—including sections of the Saini, Mali, and various agrarian groups Balay/balai (from mahabali son Balayogi/Balay) identify themselves as Balivanshi (meaning "of the line of Bali").
- Communities of Kerala: In the state of Kerala, where Mahabali is the central figure of the Onam festival, several communities (such as the Nairs and Ezhavas) historically viewed him as their ancient sovereign. While not always a claim of biological descent, the cultural identification is a core part of their social history.
- Assamese identity: Some traditions in Assam link the ancient rulers of Sonitpur (modern-day Tezpur) to the line of Banasura, thereby connecting the regional history to the broader lineage of Mahabali.
