= Mahabali (film) =

- Directed by: J. Sasikumar
- Produced by: E. K. Thyagarajan
- Starring: Prem Nazir; Jayabharathi; Adoor Bhasi; Unnimary
- Music by: M. K. Arjunan
- Production company: Sree Murugalaya Films
- Release date: 19 August 1983
- Country: India
- Language: Malayalam

Mahabali is a 1983 Indian Malayalam-language film, directed by J. Sasikumar and produced by E. K. Thyagarajan. The film stars Prem Nazir, Jayabharathi, Adoor Bhasi and Unnimary in the lead roles. The film has musical score by M. K. Arjunan.

== Cast ==
- Prem Nazir as Mahabali
- Jayabharathi as Vindhyavali
- Adoor Bhasi as Prahladan
- Unnimary as Nandini
- Ravi Menon as Paramashivan
- M. G. Soman as Naradan
- T. G. Ravi as Shukracharyan
- Meena as Aditi
- Rajkumar Sethupathi as Banan
- C. I. Paul as Devendran
- Sankaradi as Shilpi
- Alummoodan

== Soundtrack ==
The music was composed by M. K. Arjunan and the lyrics were written by Pappanamkodu Lakshmanan.

No.	Song	Singers	Lyrics	Length (m:ss)
1	"Aashritha Valsalane"	Seerkazhi Govindarajan	Pappanamkodu Lakshmanan	
2	"Maveli Naadu Vaaneedum Kaalam"	P. Madhuri, Chorus		
3	"Sougandhikangal Vidarnnu"	Vani Jairam, Krishnachandran	Pappanamkodu Lakshmanan	
4	"Sudarsanayaagam"	K. P. Brahmanandan, Chorus	Pappanamkodu Lakshmanan	
5	"Swarangal Paadasarangalil"	Vani Jairam, Lathika	Pappanamkodu Lakshmanan	
