= Namasu (Hinduism) =

Hindu mythological figure

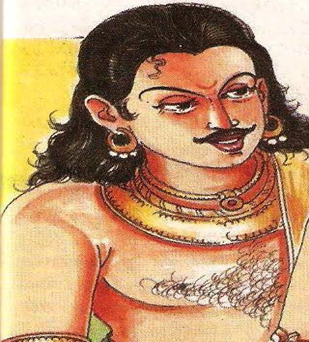
- Abode: Patala
- Gender: Male

Genealogy
- Parents: Mahabali (father); Vindhyavali (mother)
- Siblings: Banasura

Namuchi (Sanskrit: नमुचि, romanized: Namuchi), also known as Namasu is the son of the asura king Mahabali and the great-grandson of Prahlada in Hindu mythology. Among the 100 children of Mahabali, he is recognized as an exemplary devotee of Vishnu. Namasu was known as Upendra and Atheendhra.

== Legend ==
Namasu's elder brother, Banasura, is known for his unwavering devotion to Shiva, serving as a divine attendant in his celestial abode of Kailash. Namasu is described to have played a role during Vishnu's incarnation of Vamana, accompanying his father to Patala (netherworld).

Through the boon granted to Prahlada, allowing for 27 generations of his line to bear Chiranjeevi (immortal) status, Namasu is described as residing in Patala alongside Mahabali. It is believed that his descendants, with the blessings of Vishnu, are under the divine protection of a guardian stationed outside the realm.

According to the boon from Vamana, King Mahabali is destined to become the next Indra in the upcoming Krita Yuga after the end of the current Kali Yuga, estimated to conclude after approximately 4,26,000 years. In that future era, Prince Namasu is prophesied to hold a prominent position in Swarga, receiving divine blessings from his ancestor Prahlada.
