= Seven Immortals =

Seven Immortals can refer to:

- Seven Immortals (Chinese mythology)
- Seven Immortals (gang)
- Seven Immortals / Chiranjivi (Hindu Mythology)
