= Prahlad Ghat =

Ghat of the Ganges, in Varanasi, Uttar Pradesh, India

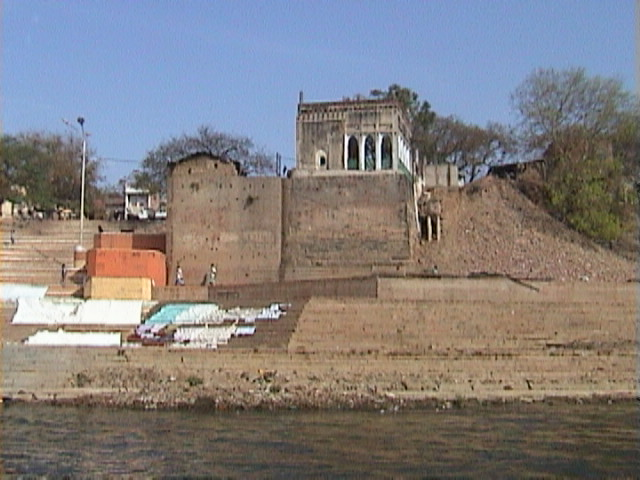
Prahlad Ghat (2002)

The Prahlad Ghat is a Hindu pilgrimage site dedicated to Prahlad, son of Hiranyakashipu and it is located in Hardoi district of the state of Uttar Pradesh, northern India. The ghat is located along with Narsimha temple.

== Architecture and history ==
In the past, Hardoi was the city of Hiranyakashipu and he was a traitor of Hari (God), so he named his city as Haridrohi. His son Prahlad was a devotee of Lord Hari and in order to kill him, Hiranyakashipu had set up his sister Holika in the fire. Holika had a boon that she would not burn by fire. Holika had to pay the price of her sinister desire by her life. Holika was not aware that the boon worked only when she entered the fire alone. Prahlad, who kept chanting the name of Lord Naarayana all this while, came out unharmed, as the lord blessed him for his extreme devotion. As an evidence there is a prahlad ghat in Hardoi.

== Festivals ==
Holi is the biggest festival celebrated at and near the ghat. People gather and remember the legendary historic story of bhakt Prahlad and Holika and start Holi celebration from here.
