= Vijayavalli =

Vijayavalli is a given name of these characters from the Hindu scriptures:

- Vindhyavalli, the spouse of Mahabali
- Vijayavalli, the spouse of Sudarshana or Chakrapani
