= Mahajanas =

Designation in Hinduism

A Mahajana (Sanskrit: महाजन, romanized: Mahājana, lit. 'great person') refers to one the twelve beings of spiritual authority affiliated with the Hindu deity Vishnu, who are described to teach religious ideal, and who, by his conduct, sets an example for others to follow.

== Literature ==
The Bhagavata Purana (6.3.20-21) lists twelve Mahajanas, regarded to be the greatest devotees of Vishnu:

- Brahma,
- Narada,
- Shiva,
- Four Kumaras,
- Kapila,
- Svayambhuva Manu,
- Prahlada,
- Janaka,
- Bhishma,
- Bali,
- Śuka, and
- Yama.
