= Vindhyavali =

Wife of Mahabali in Hinduism

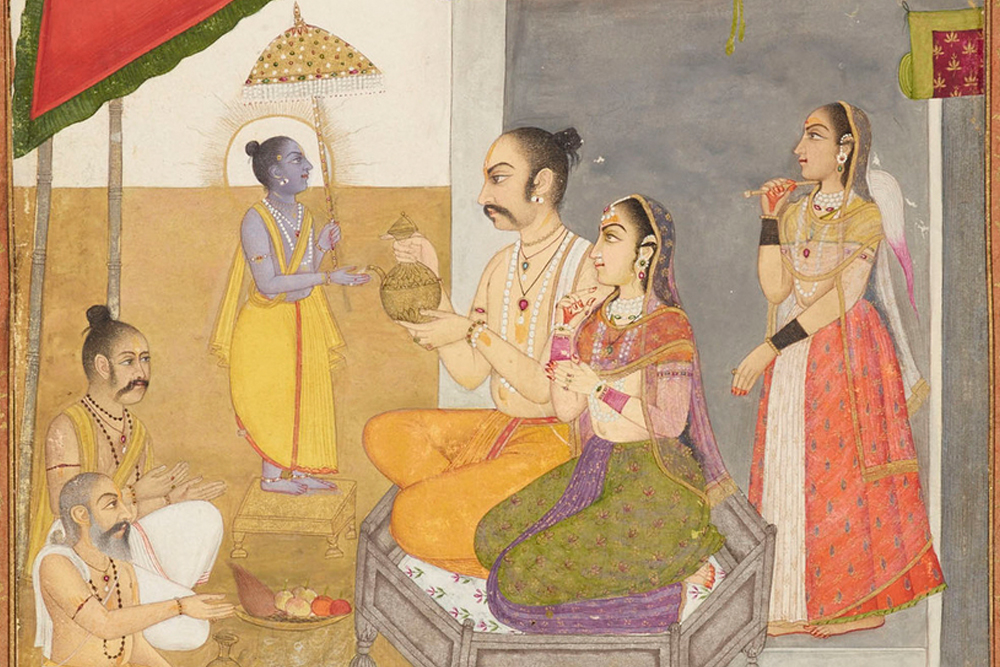
- Painting of Mahabali and Vindhyavali serving Vishnu in his dwarf form Vamana, while a suspicious Shukra tries to stop him.
- Mantra: "OM MATHA VINDHYAVALLIYE NAMAHA"

Genealogy
- Spouse: Mahabali
- Children: Banasura, Namasu (Hinduism), Ratnamala

Vindhyavali (Sanskrit: विन्ध्यावलि, romanized: Vindhyāvalī), also known as Ashrama or Balika is the wife of the asura king Mahabali in Hindu mythology, with whom, according to Hindu texts, she had a progeny of one hundred children, including his two sons Banasura and Namasu, as well as a daughter named Ratnamala.

== Legend ==
In Hindu tradition, Mahabali, the son of Virochana and the grandson of Prahlada, was an asura king. Vindhyavali, Mahabali's wife, is identified as the daughter of Himavan. It is noted in certain accounts that Vindhyavalli exemplified the qualities of a virtuous and supportive family woman towards Mahabali.

Vindhyavali is a somewhat less frequently mentioned figure in Hindu scriptures. Descriptions depict Vindhyavali as both beautiful and compassionate, exhibiting a caring disposition towards all living beings. Some narratives further maintain that the Mahabali-Vindhyavalli couple resulted in the birth of one hundred sons, including the renowned Banasura and Namasu. As an exemplary wife to Mahabali, Vindhyavali is said to have evenly distributed her affection amongst all her one hundred sons. According to the Puranas, Vindhyavali demonstrated great respect towards Mahabali's grandfather, Prahlada. It is also believed that Vindhyavali once saved Banasura from the wrath of Krishna by appearing in the battlefield in her nude form.

== See also ==
- Vamana
- Mahabali
- Banasura
- Ratnamala
- Vishnu
- Prahlada
- Himavan
