= Hiranyaksha =

Asura in Hindu scriptures

- King of the Asuras
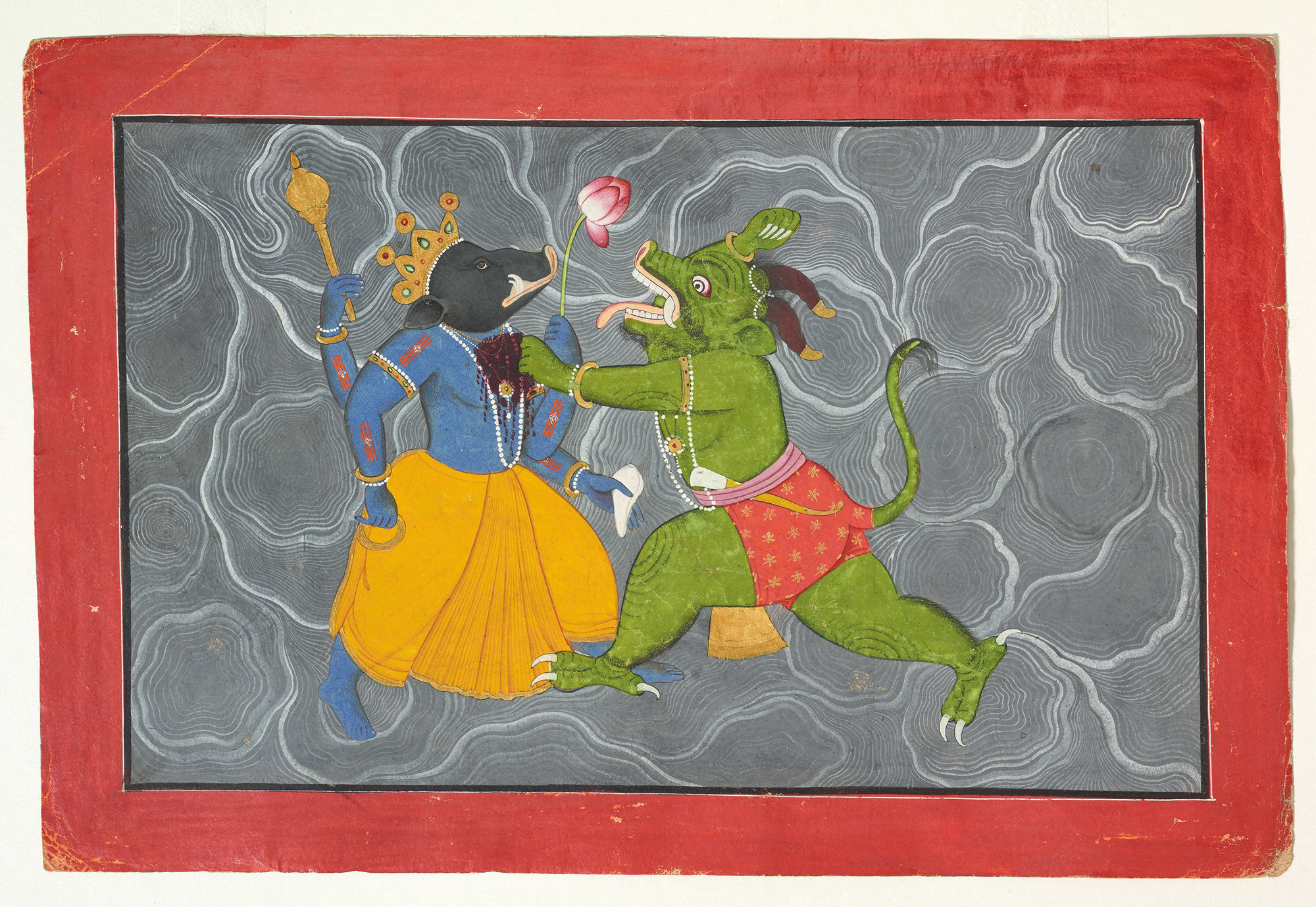
- Varaha battles the Hiranyaksha, Scene from the Bhagavata Purana by Manaku of Guler (c. 1740)
- Affiliation: Asura
- Predecessor: Kashyapa
- Successor: Hiranyakashipu
- Abode: Patala
- Weapon: Mace

Genealogy
- Parents: Kashyapa (father); Diti (mother)
- Siblings: Hiranyakashipu (Older brother); Holika (younger sister)
- Consort: Rushabhanu
- Children: Andhaka

Daitya Sequence
- Predecessor: Kashyapa
- Successor: Hiranyakashipu

Hiranyaksha (Sanskrit: हिरण्याक्ष, lit. 'golden-eyed', IAST: Hiraṇyākṣa), also known as Hiranyanetra (Sanskrit: हिरण्यनेत्र) was an asura king as per Hindu mythology. He is described to have submerged the earth and terrorised the three worlds. He was slain by the Varaha (wild boar) avatar of Vishnu, who rescued the earth goddess Bhumi and restored order to the earth.

== Legend ==
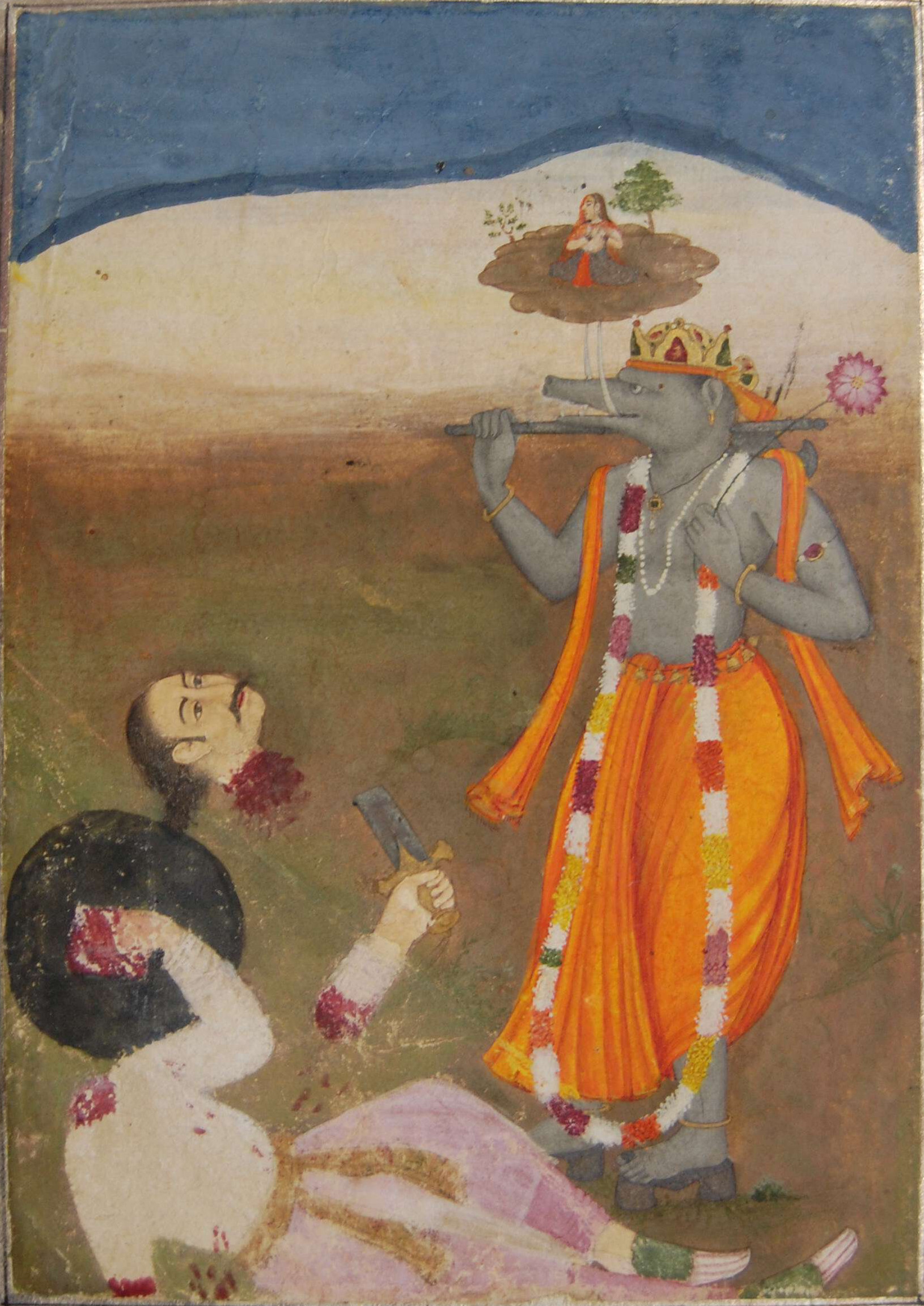
The boar avatar Varaha, the third incarnation of Vishnu, stands in front of the decapitated body of the asura Hiranyaksha

Some of the Puranas present Hiranyaksha as the son of Diti and Kashyapa. Having performed austerities to propitiate Brahma, Hiranyaksha received the boon of invulnerability of meeting his death by neither any god, man, nor beast.

Having received this boon, Hiranyaksha assaulted the defenceless Bhumi and pulled her deep beneath the cosmic ocean. The other deities appealed to Vishnu to save the earth goddess and creation. Answering their plea, Vishnu assumed the avatar of a wild boar (Varaha) to rescue the goddess. Hiranyaksha attempted to obstruct him, after which he was slain by Vishnu.

Hiranyaksha had an elder brother named Hiranyakashipu, who similarly achieved a boon of invulnerability and conquered the three worlds, seeking vengeance for his brother's death. He tried to persecute and abuse his son Prahlada for being a faithful devotee of Vishnu. While Hiranyaksha was slain by Varaha (the boar avatar of Vishnu), Hiranyakashipu was killed by Narasimha (the man-lion avatar of Vishnu). Their younger sister was Holika, who tried to kill her nephew by attempting to immolate him but got burnt herself and killed.

In some texts including the Bhagavata Purana, Hiranyaksha is an incarnation of one of the dvarapalas (gatekeepers) of Vishnu named Vijaya. Vishnu's guardians Jaya-Vijaya, were cursed by the Four Kumaras (Brahma's sons) to incarnate on earth either three times as enemies of Vishnu, or seven times as his devotees. They chose to take birth on earth thrice. During their first births (during the Satya Yuga), they were born as Hiranyakashipu and Hiranyaksha. During their second births, (during the Treta Yuga), they were born as Ravana and Kumbhakarna. During their third births (during the Dvapara Yuga), they were born as Shishupala and Dantavakra.

== Origins and significance ==
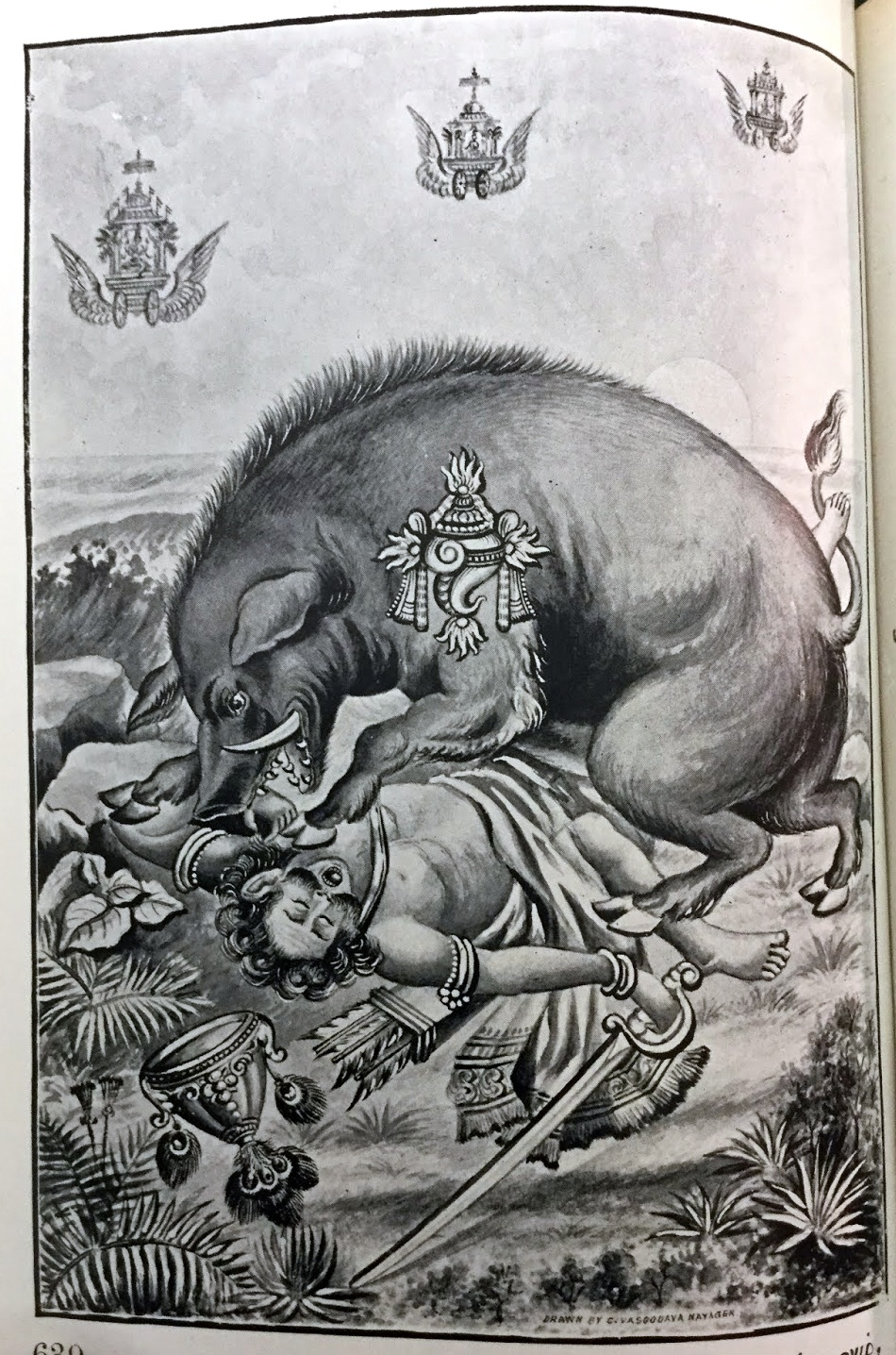
Varaha slays Hiranyaksha, and the devas shower flowers from heaven

This Hindu legend has roots in the Vedic literature such as Taittariya Samhita and Shatapatha Brahmana, and is found in many post-Vedic texts. These legends depict the earth goddess (Bhumi or Prithvi) in an existential crisis, where neither she nor the life she supports can survive. She is drowning and overwhelmed in the cosmic ocean. Vishnu emerges in the form of a man-boar avatar. He, as the protagonist of the legend, descends into the ocean and finds her. She hangs onto his tusk, and he lifts her out to safety. Good wins, the crisis ends, and Vishnu once again fulfills his cosmic duty. The Varaha legend has been one of many archetypal legends in the Hindu text embedded with the theme of right versus wrong, good versus evil symbolism, and of someone willing to go to the depths and do what is necessary to rescue the righteous and uphold dharma.

== See also ==
- Eran
- Udayagiri Caves

Preceded by Started	Daityas -	Succeeded by Hiranyakashipu
Preceded by Kashyapa	King of the Asuras; Satya Yuga	Succeeded by Hiranyakashipu
