= Upendra =

Upendra (Devanagari: उपेन्द्र) is an Indian masculine given name. The meaning of the Sanskrit word upendra is "younger brother of Indra" along with "superior to Indra" and refers to either Krishna or Vishnu, who as a son of Aditi (in the Vamana avatar) was born subsequently after Indra.

== Persons with the name ==
- Upendra (actor), an Indian Kannada actor, director, producer, screenwriter, lyricist and singer
- Upendra Bhanja, 17th century poet of Odia literature
- Upendra Bhat, singer of Hindustani classical music
- Upendra Kumar (1941–2002), Indian music director mainly in Kannada and Oriya films
- Upendra Kushwaha (born 1960), Indian politician and minister
- Upendra Limaye (born 1969), Indian Marathi film actor
- Upendra Sidhaye (born 1980), Indian screenplay and story writer
- Upendra Tiwari, Indian politician
- Upendra Yadav, (born 1960), Nepali politician
- P. Upendra or Parvathaneni Upendra (1936–2009), Indian politician and minister
- Priyanka Upendra, Indian actress in Hindi, Telugu, Kannada, Tamil and Bengali films
