= Daitya =

Race in Hindu mythology

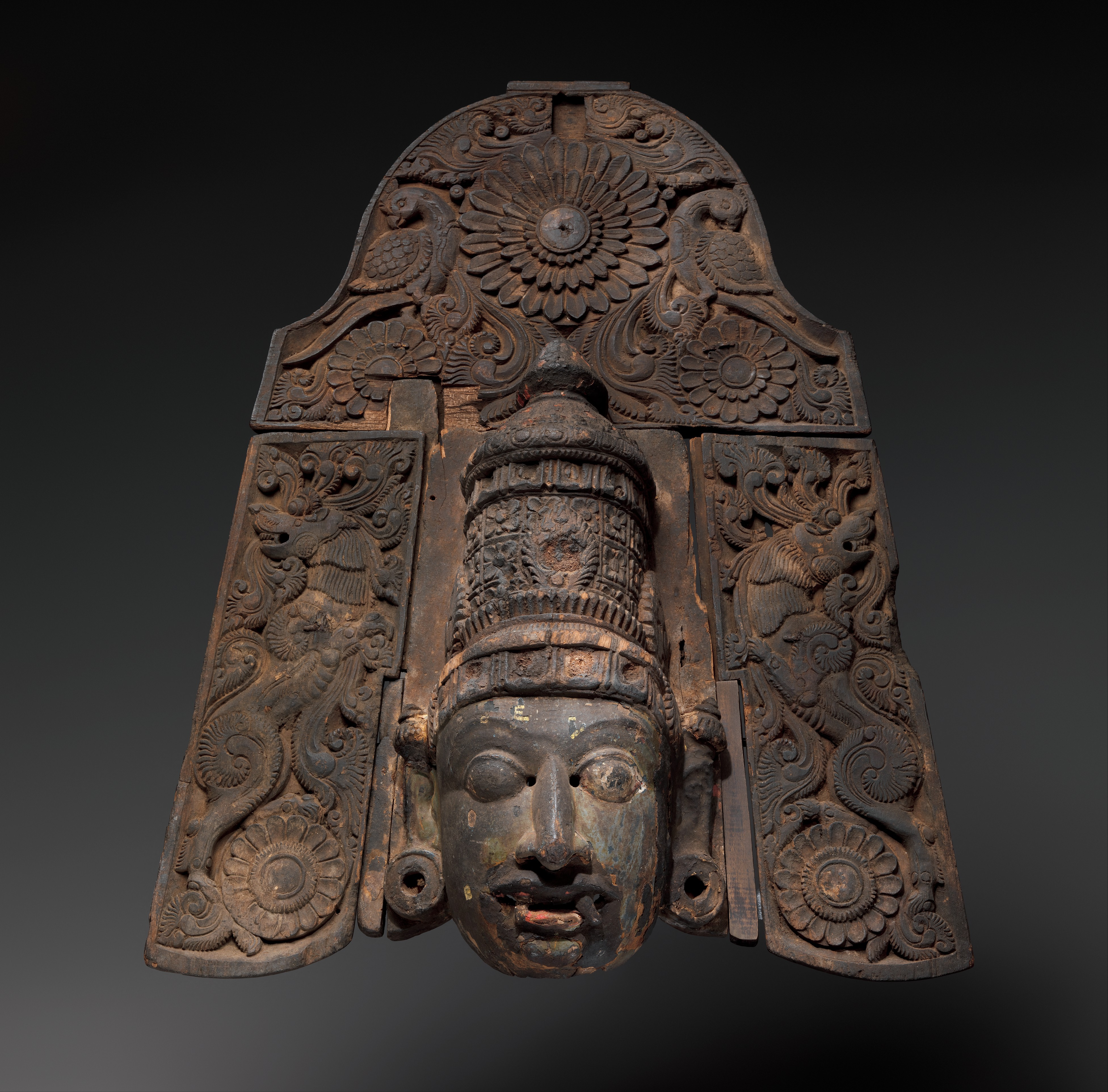
- Sculpture of the daitya king Hiranyakashipu
- Affiliation: Asuras
- Texts: Puranas
- Parents: Kashyapa and Diti

The daityas (Sanskrit: दैत्याः) are a race of asuras in Hinduism, descended from Kashyapa and his wife, Diti. Prominent members of this race include Hiranyaksha, Hiranyakashipu, and Mahabali, all of whom overran the earth, and required three of Vishnu's avataras to be vanquished.

== Etymology and symbolism ==
According to the interpretation of the Rig Veda by the Indian philosopher Sri Aurobindo, the name "Daitya" is derived from Diti, the mother of the Daityas, who represents "divided consciousness" or "separative consciousness." Sri Aurobindo writes: "Aditi the infinite, the undivided, is the mother of the Gods, Diti or Danu, the division, the separative consciousness the mother of the Titans; therefore the gods in man move towards light, infinity and unity, the Titans dwell in their cave of the darkness and issue forth into the divided worlds.

According to Nolini Kanta Gupta, a disciple of Sri Aurobindo, the Indian philosophical tradition did not consider the Daityas or Asuras as essentially evil or irrevocably condemned. Instead, "Diti and Aditi are sisters, twin aspects of the same Supreme Being." The Daityas are viewed as a formation of the Divine himself, and their hostility ultimately culminates in submission to the Divine Will and merging into it.

== Literature ==
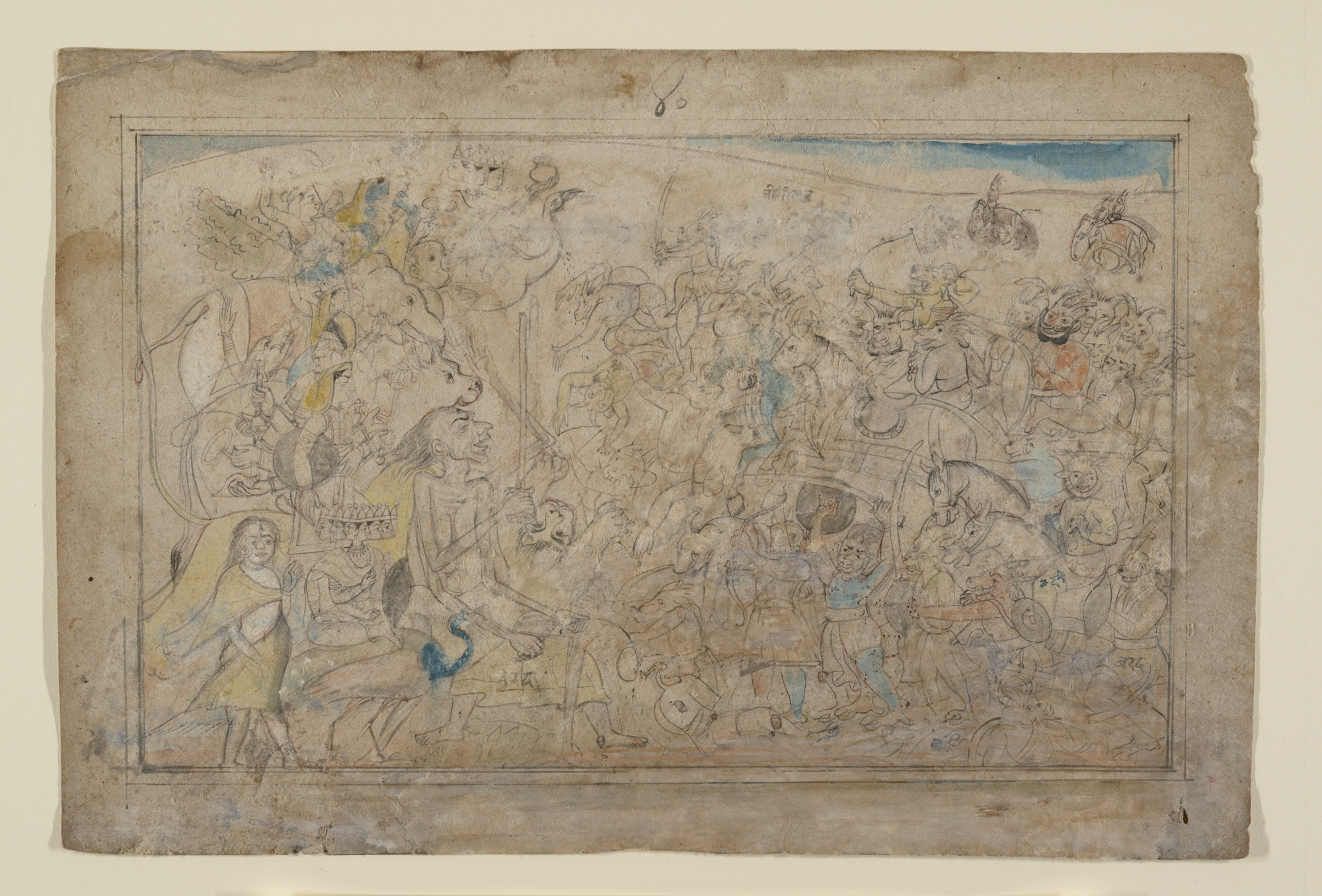
Image of the daitya army

The Manusmṛiti classifies the daityas as good, while placing them at a lower level than the devas:

Tāpasā yatayo viprā ye ca vaimānikā gaṇāḥ
Nakṣatrāṇi ca daityāśca prathamā sāttvikī gatiḥ

Ascetics and hermits, Brāhmaṇas, celestial beings, (Note: "Vaimānikā gaṇa" literally refers to those who ride in Vimanas, generally referring to the gods.) lunar asterisms, and Daityas represent the first state partaking of 'Sattva.'

— Manusmṛti 12.48

The origin and noteworthy members of this race are specified in the Harivamsha Purana:

Kashyapa, the well-dressed son of Marichi, espoused two sisters of Prajapati, Diti and Aditi. The great Kashyapa begat on Aditi the twelve classes of the celestials, Dhata, Aryama, Mitra, Varuna, Amsha, Bhaga, Indra, Vivashvan, Pusha, Parjanya, Twastha and Vishnu. He began on Diti the powerful Hiranyakashipu. The Daitya-chief Hiranyaksha was his younger brother. Hiranyakashipu had five highly powerful sons, namely Pralhada, Hlada, Sangrada, Jambha and Anuhrada. Pralhada's son was Virocana whose son was Bali. Their sons and grand-sons were all very powerful. Thousands of the descendants of these highly powerful daityas are seen all over the land. Having seen Hiranyakashipu slain by the Man-lion the Daityas made Bali their chief for the destruction of the gods. He was heroic, powerful, pious and self-controlled like Hiranyakashipu and therefore was installed as their king by the Daityas.

— Harivamsha, Chapter 40

== List of daityas ==
Some of the notable daityas mentioned in Hindu mythology include:

- Hiranyaksha – Second son of Kashyapa and Diti
- Hiranyakashipu – First son of Kashyapa and Diti
- Holikā – First daughter of Kashyapa and Diti
- Andhakāsura – Son of Hiraṇyākṣa (Born from the sweat of Śiva)
- Prahlāda – Son of Hiraṇyakaśipu
- Virocana – Son of Prahlāda, father of Mahābalī
- Devamba – Mother of Mahābalī
- Mahābalī – Son of Virocana
- Bāṇāsura – Son of Mahābalī
- Uṣā – Daughter of Bāṇāsura
- Rāhu and Ketu – Head and Body of Svarbhānu, sons of Holikā
- Vajrāṅga – Son of Kashyapa and Diti
- Tārakāsura – Son of Vajrāṅga
- Tripurasura – Son of Tārakāsura
- Shambasura
- Kalanemi – Son of Virocana

== See also ==
- Asura
- Danavas
- Devas
- Kalakeyas
- List of Asuras
- Nivatakavacha
