= Chiranjivi =

Group of immortals in Hinduism

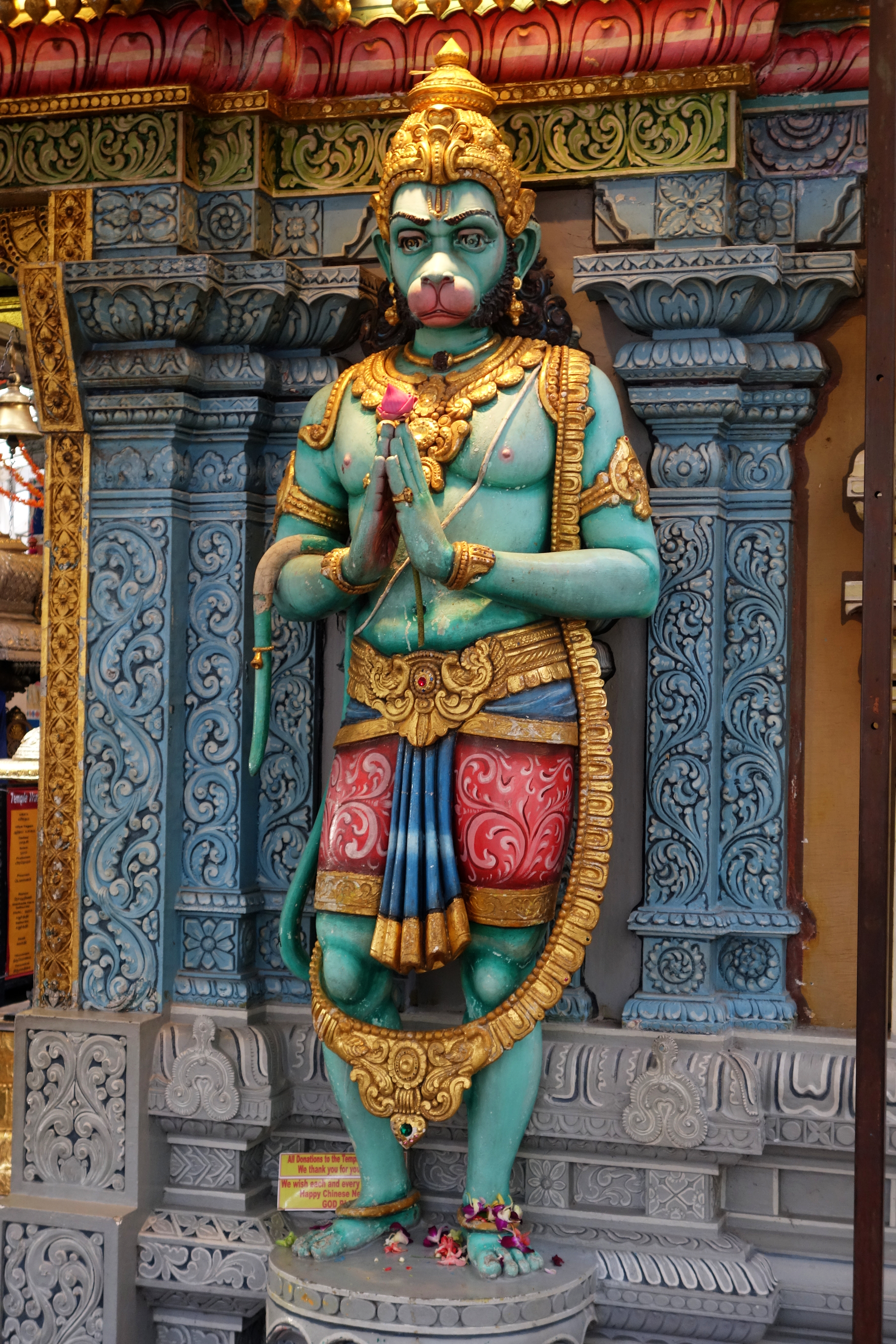
Mūrti of Hanumān, a popularly recognised chiranjivi.

In Hinduism, the Chiranjivi (Sanskrit: चिरञ्जीवी SG.NOM, romanized cirañjīvī, pronounced [t͡ɕi.ɾɐɲ.d͡ʑiː.ʋiː]; चिरञ्जीविनः PL.NOM, romanized cirañjīvinaḥ, pronounced [t͡ɕi.ɾɐɲ.d͡ʑiː.ʋi.n̪ɐh], lit. 'long-living, immortal') are a group of immortals set to remain alive on Earth until the end of the current epoch, the Kali Yuga.

== Etymology and scriptural context ==
The Sanskrit nominal stem चिरञ्जीविन् (cirañjīvin) 'long-living; one who lives for a long time' is a tatpuruṣa compound composed of the adjective चिर (cira)—here in its adverbial form चिरम् (ciram) 'for a long time'—and the noun जीविन् (jīvin) 'one who lives', itself derived from the verbal root √जीव् (√jīv) 'to live'. The specific forms चिरञ्जीवी (cirañjīvī) and चिरञ्जीविनः (cirañjīvinaḥ) are, respectively, the masculine nominative singular and nominative plural inflections of this stem.

The term cirañjīvin denotes a being with a lifespan of an entire kalpa (aeon), distinct from the concept of amaratva, which signifies absolute immortality. The distinction is illustrated in mythological narratives: at the end of the last manvantara (age of Manu), the asura Hayagrīva attempted to attain immortality by swallowing the Vedas as they escaped from the mouth of Brahmā, but the scriptures were retrieved by Viṣṇu in his Matsya incarnation. Likewise, other avatars of Viṣṇu—Narasiṃha and Rāma—slew Hiraṇyakaśipu and Rāvaṇa, respectively, both of whom had sought immortality through devotion to Brahmā and Śiva. In this context, "immortal" can signify not absolute eternity but rather survival until the cosmic dissolution, when all embodied beings, including Brahmā himself, are destined to lose their material form with the destruction of the universe.

== List ==
The extant Purāṇas, the Rāmāyaṇa, and the Mahābhārata generally describe seven immortal personalities in the Hindu pantheon. Some scholars opine the count to be eight. Each chiranjivi embodies a distinct attribute of humankind; that attribute persists among humankind for as long as the chiranjivi lives.

Name	Description
Ashvatthama	The son of Droṇa. Droṇa undertook prolonged and austere penance in order to propitiate Śiva, seeking thereby a son endowed with the valour of the deity himself. He is regarded to be an avatar of one of the eleven Rudras. He was cursed to be immortal by Kṛṣṇa for the attempted murder of Parīkṣit, suffering from incurable painful sores and ulcers.
Mahābalī	The king of the asuras, he was regarded to be a benevolent ruler. He had conquered the Bhu, Svarga and ruled the three worlds. He was sent to the realm of Sutalaloka by Vāmana, an avatar of Viṣṇu, to restore cosmic order, and was blessed with immortality.
Vyāsa	The sage and author of the Mahābhārata and compiler of Vedas. He represents erudition and wisdom. He is the son of sage Parāśara and Satyavatī, a fisherwoman. He was born towards the end of the Treta Yuga.
Hanumān	A great vānara devotee of Rāma. A brahmacārin, he stands for selflessness, courage, devotion, intelligence, strength, and righteous conduct.
Vibhīṣaṇa	A brother of Rāvaṇa. A rākṣasa, Vibhīṣaṇa defected to Rāma's side before the Laṅkā War owing to his devotion to dharma. He was later crowned the King of Laṅkā after Rāvaṇa's death. He stands for righteousness.
Kṛpa	The royal guru of the princes in the Mahābhārata. Along with his nephew Aśvatthāmā, he was among the lone survivors of the Kaurava warriors who fought in the Kurukṣetra War.
Paraśurāma	The sixth avatar of Viṣṇu. He is knowledgeable in the use of all the divine weapons (astra) and the treatises (śāstra). The Kalkipurāṇa states that he will reemerge at the end of time to be the martial guru of Kalki. He is stated to instruct the final avatar to undertake penance to receive celestial weaponry, required to save mankind during the Pralay.

Other individuals who are sometimes additionally included to the list are the following:

Name	Description
Mārkaṇḍeya	A sage and the author of the Mārkaṇḍeyapurāṇa. Although fated to be an exemplary child who would die at the age of sixteen, he was rescued from an early death at the hands of Yama, the god of death, by his devotion to Śiva. The deity blessed him with immortality for his ardent faith.
Kākabhuśuṇḍi	A devotee of Rāma, he narrates the story of the Rāmāyaṇa to Garuḍa in the form of a crow.
Jāmbavān	The king of the bears. He was born from the yawn of Brahmā and was already six manvantaras old during the period of the Rāmāyaṇa. He assisted Rāma in his quest to rescue his abducted wife, Sītā, in the epic.
Agastya	A great sage. He is the composer of many hymns in the Ṛgveda and is regarded the father of Siddha medicine.
Nārada	A mind-born son of Brahmā and sage-divinity. He travels to different worlds and delivers tidings carrying his vīṇā.

== Cirañjīviśloka ==
The Cirañjīviśloka (चिरञ्जीविश्लोक) is a hymn that names the Chiranjivi and states the effects of their meditation:

Original Sanskrit:

अश्वत्थामा बलिर्व्यासो हनुमांश्च विभीषणः।
कृपः परशुरामश्च सप्तैतै चिरञ्जीविनः॥
सप्तैतान् संस्मरेन्नित्यं मार्कण्डेयमथाष्टमम्।
जीवेद्वर्षशतं सोऽपि सर्वव्याधिविवर्जितः॥

Transliteration:

aśvatthāmā balirvyāso hanumāṃśca vibhīṣaṇaḥ.
kṛpaḥ paraśurāmaśca saptaitai cirañjīvinaḥ.
saptaitān saṃsmarennityaṃ mārkaṇḍeyamathāṣṭamam.
jīvedvarṣaśataṃ soʼpi sarvavyādhivivarjitaḥ.

English translation:

Aśvatthāmā, Mahābalī, Vyāsa, Hanumān, Vibhīṣaṇa,
Kṛpa, and Paraśurāma are the seven chiranjivi.
One who remembers these seven daily, along with Mārkaṇḍeya as the eighth,
Will live for a hundred years, free from all ailments.

The mantra states that the remembrance of the eight immortals (Aśvatthāmā, Mahābalī, Vyāsa, Hanumān, Vibhīṣaṇa, Kṛpa, Paraśurāma, and Mārkaṇḍeya) offers one freedom from ailments and longevity.
