= Virochana =

Asura in Hinduism

- King of the Asuras
- Affiliation: Daitya, Asura
- Predecessor: Prahlada
- Successor: Mahabali
- Texts: Puranas, Mahabharata

Genealogy
- Parents: Prahlada (father), Dhriti (mother)
- Siblings: Kumbha, Nikumbha, Ayushman, Shibi (brothers), Virochanā (sister)
- Spouse: Vishalakshi and Devi
- Children: Mahabali

Virochana (Sanskrit: विरोचन, romanized: Virocana) is an asura king in Hinduism. He is the son of Prahlada, the grandson of Hiranyakashipu (according to the Atharvaveda (VIII.10.22), and the father of Bali.

== Legend ==
Being the son of Prahlada, a staunch devotee of Vishnu, Virochana is raised to be religious, performing rites and rituals with care. He is stated to be kind towards Brahmins.

In the Mahabharata, Vidura recounts the tale of Virochana and Sudhanva, the son of Sage Angiras. During the svayamvara of a beautiful princess called Kesini, the asura prince was asked to state if Brahmins were superior to the daityas. Being a daitya himself, Virochana replied that the daityas were superior, due to the worlds being under their suzerainty. Kesini invites Sudhanva to join them the following morning, washing his feet according to custom. Virochana offered to share his own golden seat with the Brahmin, but the latter turned down this offer, stating that Prahlada always chose to seat himself beneath him. The daitya and the Brahmin staked their lives on their answers to Kesini's question, and went to Prahlada for arbitration. Prahlada stated that as Angiras was superior to him, Sudhanva was superior to Virochana. Moved by the fact that the asura monarch had not been dishonest, even for the sake of protecting his son, Sudhanva does not claim Virochana's life, merely having him wash his feet in the presence of the princess.

In the Shatapatha Brahmana, Indra lost his regal aura to Virochana, and had to flee Amaravati. Seeking to obtain his aura once more, he assumed the form of a poor priest and joined the service of the asura king. He learnt that Virochana had earned the favour of Shri due to his virtue. Pleased with Indra's service, Virochana offered his servant a boon of his choice, and the latter asked for Virochana's virtue. Without guile, Virochana granted him what he asked, and hence lost the favour of the goddess, whereas Indra was able to once again assume his throne.

According to an Upapurana called the Ganesha Purana, Surya was once pleased with Virochana, granting him a crown. The sun god told Virochana that he would only die if the crown was removed from his head. As a result, the asura king grew arrogant. To punish him, Vishnu assumed the form of a beautiful damsel and enticed him into giving away the crown, after which the asura was slain.

According to the Chandogya Upanishad (VIII.7.2-8.5), Indra and he went to Prajapati to learn about the Atman (Self) and lived there, practising a brahmacharya lifestyle for thirty-two years. The two form different interpretations of the philosophy they had learnt, and hence spread these variations among their races. Virochana is stated to later be killed by Indra during the Tarakamaya War between the devas and the asuras.

Preceded by Prahlada	Daityas unknown	Succeeded by Mahabali
