= Banasura =

Hindu mythological character

- King of the Asuras
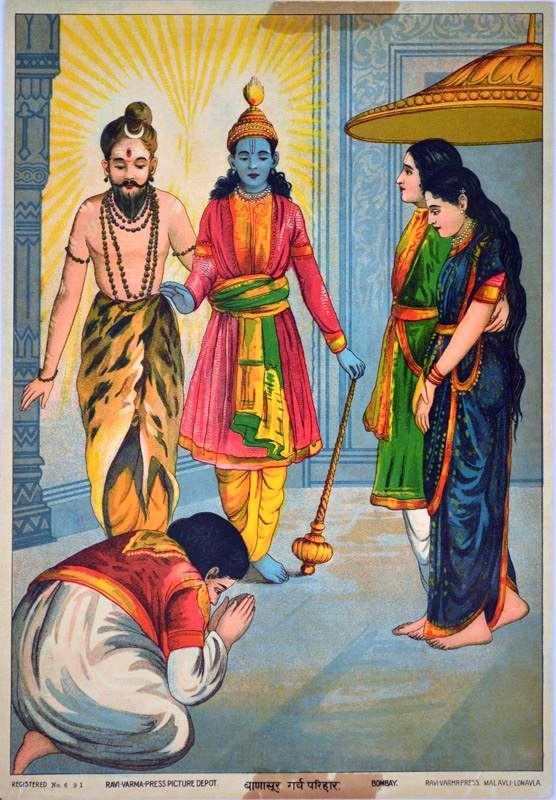
- Banasura begs mercy from Krishna
- Affiliation: Asura, Shaivism
- Predecessor: Mahabali
- Texts: Bhagavata Purana

Genealogy
- Parents: Mahabali (father)
- Consort: Ambavati also known as Vrinda
- Children: Usha

Bana, also referred to as Banasura (Sanskrit: बाणासुर, romanized: Bāṇāsura), is an asura king in Hindu mythology, ruling from the city of Śoṇitapura. He is described to be the son of Mahabali. His tale of battling Krishna is described in the Bhagavata Purana.

== Legend ==
A mighty asura, Bana once ruled over a large kingdom, Śoṇitapura. His influence was so strong and fierce that all the kings – and even some of the devas – shuddered in front of him. Banasura used to worship a rasalingam given to him by Vishvakarman, on instruction from Vishnu. As an ardent devotee of Shiva, he used his thousand arms to play the mridangam when Shiva was performing the tandavam dance. When Shiva offered Banasura a boon, the latter requested Shiva to be his city's guardian: therefore, Banasura became invincible. As time passed, he became even more cruel and arrogant. One day, Banasura's daughter, Usha, saw a young man in her dream, had sex with him, and fell in love with him. Chitralekha, a friend of Usha and a talented artist, helped Usha to identify the young man seen in her dream by sketching various portraits of the Vrishnis. Usha realised that she had dreamt of Aniruddha, the grandson of Krishna. Chitralekha, through her yogic powers, abducted Aniruddha from the palace of Krishna and brought him to Śoṇitapura.

Usha worshipped her lover and furnished him with priceless garments, garlands, fragrances, lamps, and with beverages, dishes, and words. Breaking her vow of chastity with him, she kept him hidden in her maiden quarters, and the lovers lost track of the days. Catching wind of his daughter's activities, Banasura rushed to her chambers to find her playing dice with Aniruddha. Even as the prince fended off the guards, Banasura subdued him with the mystical ropes of Varuna. Usha was overwhelmed with sorrow due to this incident. Aniruddha was held captive by Banasura for a month, until Narada informed the Yadus in Dvaraka, who were searching for Aniruddha.

The Yadus' army attacked Banasura in a great battle. The Yadu princes and their army besieged his kingdom with 12 akshauhinis, surrounding it completely. Banasura staged a fierce counterattack. During the war, Shiva appeared on the battlefield, riding on Nandi, to protect his devotee, Banasura. Balarama fought against Banasura's commander, while Samba fought against Banasura's son. To bear witness, the leaders of the godly souls headed by Brahma came in their celestial vehicles, as also did the sages, the perfected souls, and the venerable personalities, the singers and apsaras of heaven, and the yakshinis. Krishna and Shiva faced each other. Krishna used a brahmastra against Shiva's brahmastra, a mountain weapon against a wind weapon, a rain weapon against a fire weapon, and his narayanastra against Shiva's pashupatastra. Kartikeya, assaulted by Pradyumna's arrows, fled the battlefield on his peacock. After duelling with Satyaki, Bana took up arms against Krishna. However, Krishna blew his conch and instantly, Banasura's charioteer was killed and his chariot broken and shattered. When Shiva's forces had been defeated, Jvara, the embodiment of Shiva's fever, bearing three heads and three feet, attacked Krishna with scorching heat. Krishna produced his own Jvara of frigid coldness, and the two fought each other. Overwhelmed by Vishnu's fever, Shiva's Jvara offered its surrender and obeisance to Krishna and departed. Krishna then put Shiva to sleep using 'Jrmbhunastra'.

Meanwhile, Balarama defeated Banasura's commander. Bana rode forth upon his chariot to fight with Krishna, and the latter fought back with his Sudarshana Chakra. When Krishna started chopping Banasura's arms, Shiva returned to his senses and extolled the glories of Krishna, requested him not to kill Banasura, whom he had bestowed with fearlessness. Obliging, Krishna replied that he had never intended to kill Banasura, since he was the son of Bali and the great-grandson of the devout Prahlada. Vishnu had promised Bali not to kill any member of his family, and therefore would not slay him. However, Krishna severed Banasura's extra arms to destroy the latter's pride, leaving Banasura with only four arms.

Banasura realised his mistake and bowed his head before Krishna, arranging for a chariot to seat Aniruddha and Usha for their wedding in Dvaraka.

== Family ==
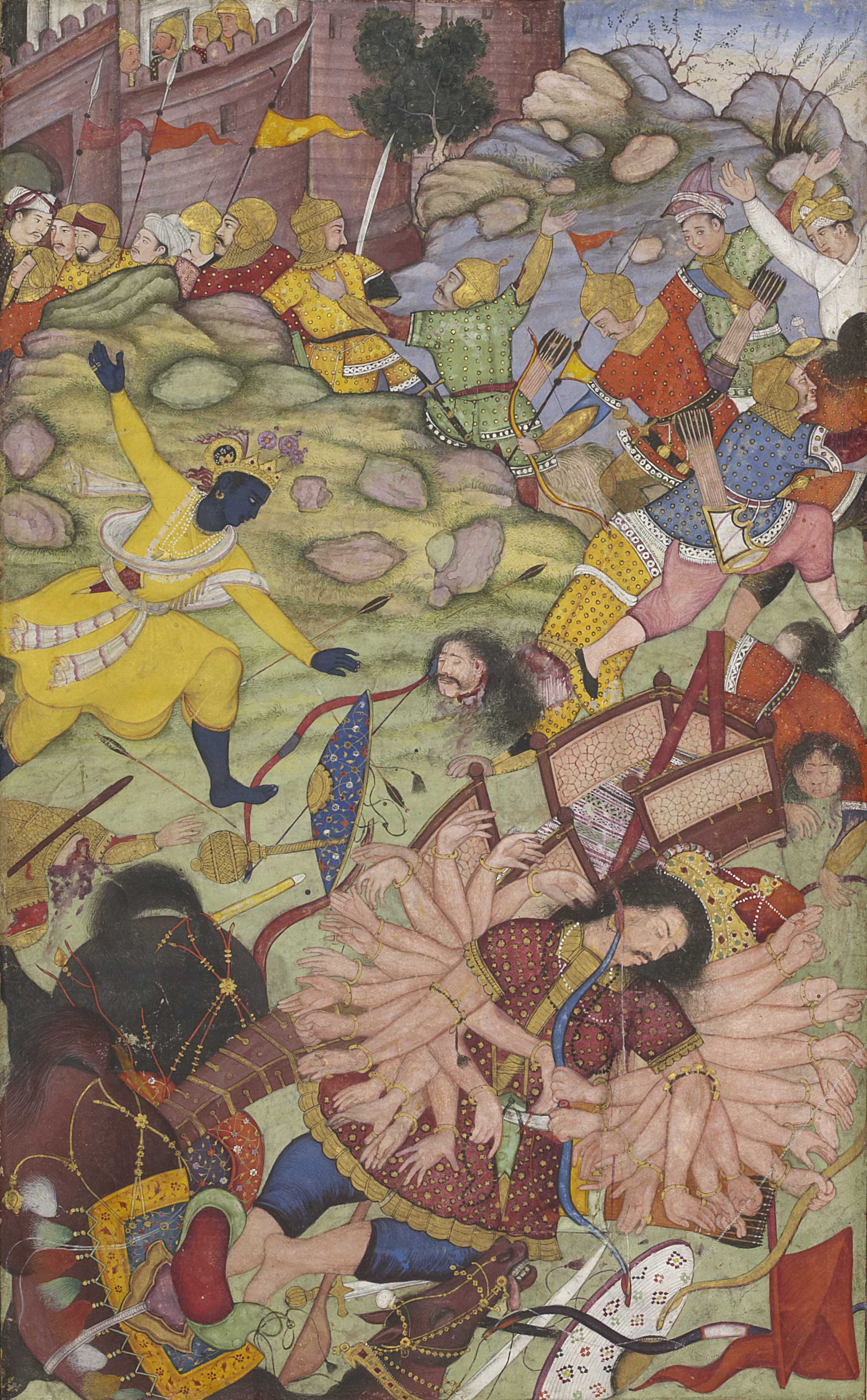
Krishna defeats Banasura.

The genealogy of Banasura is as follows:

- Brahma's son was Marichi
- Marichi's son was Kashyapa,
- Kashyapa's sons were Hiranyakashipu and Hiranyaksha,
- Hiranyakashipu's son was Prahlada,
- Prahlada's son was Virochana,
- Virochana's son was Bali,
- Bali's eldest son was Banasura

Banasura's story has been narrated in Indian epic Mahabharata and Bhagavata Purana.

Banasura' story as the rejected suitor for goddess Shakti is present in Tamil Sangam literary works Manimekalai and Puranaanooru; Bhattavataar's Banasura Katha.

== In popular culture ==
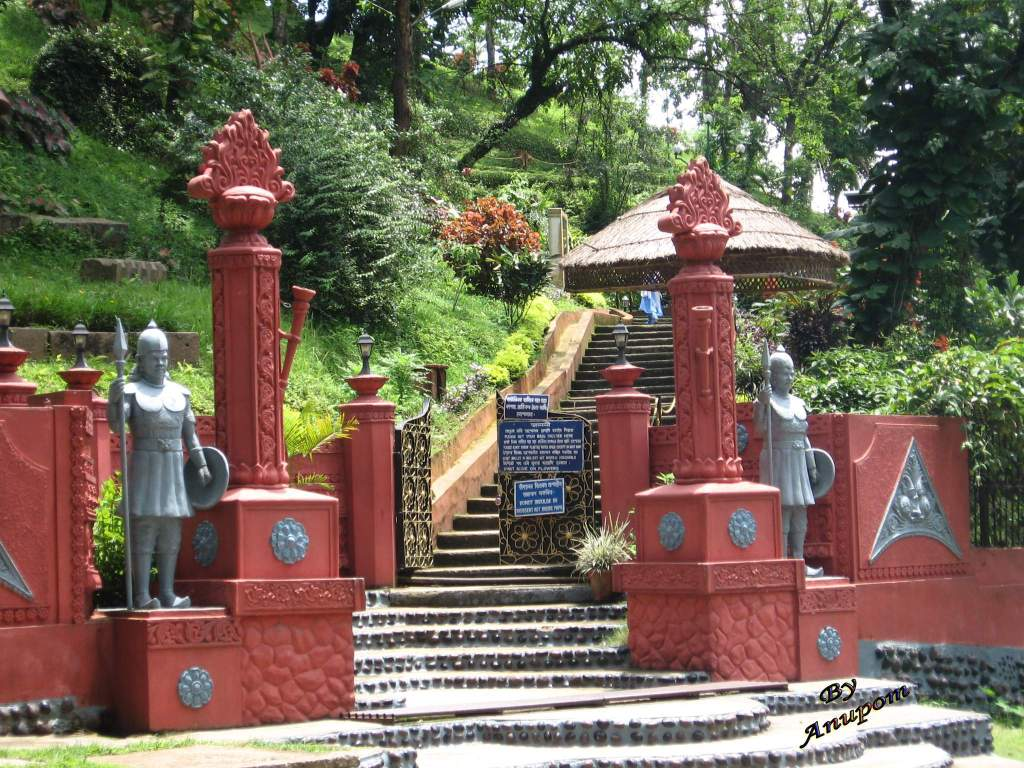
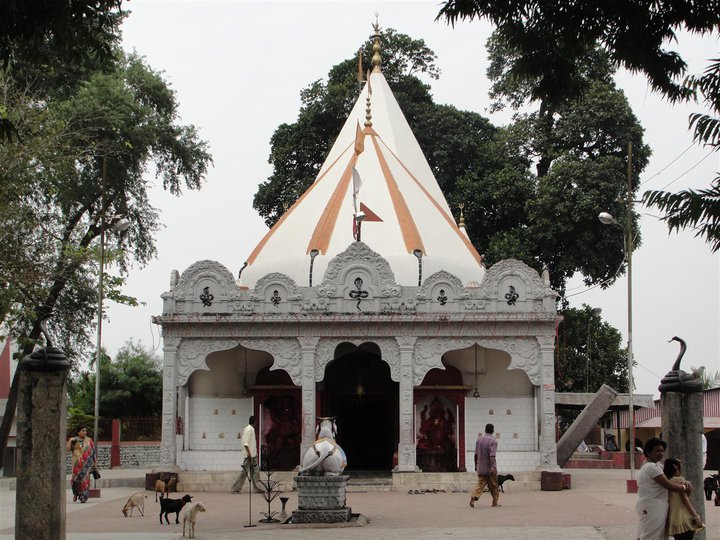
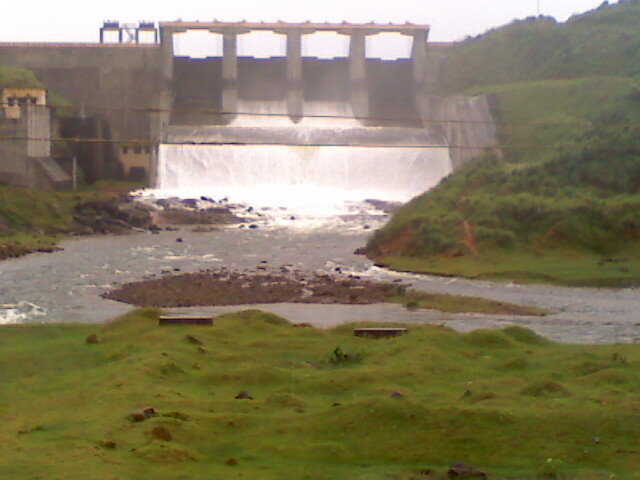
Agnigarh Hill (top) Mahabhairav Temple (middle) Banasura Sagar Dam (bottom)
- According to Assamese belief, the Agnigarh hillock was built by Banasura to keep his daughter Usha in isolation.
- Mahabhairav Temple is believed to have been established by king Bana with a Siva lingam. Formerly, this temple was built of stone but the present one is built of concrete. During the later years, the Ahom kings donated devottar land for the Temple and Pujaris and Paiks were appointed to look after the temple.
- To the east of Tezpur, on the bank of the river Brahmaputra, a temple called Rudrapada is situated. It is believed that Rudra (Shiva) had left the print of his left foot (pada) on a stone found in the temple. It is believed that Mahadeva showed his real self to king Bana there.
- Banasura Sagar Dam, Kerala is named after Banasura because he was the son of Mahabali and as per local belief, Mahabali is a very respected king in Kerala.

== Sources ==
- Boruah, Nirode (2005). "'Early State' Formation in the Brahmaputra Valley of Assam". Proceedings of the Indian Historical Congress. 66: 1464–1465. JSTOR 44145968.
- Dictionary of Hindu Lore and Legend (ISBN 0-500-51088-1) by Anna Dhallapiccola
- Sircar, D C (1990), Barpujari, H K (ed.), The Comprehensive History of Assam, vol. I, Guwahati: Publication Board, Assam, pp. 79–93
- Acharya Chandra Shekhar Shastri: Puranon ki Anmol Kahanian, 2006 ISBN 81-902258-6-3
