= Hiranyakashipu =

Asura in Hindu mythology

- King of the Asuras
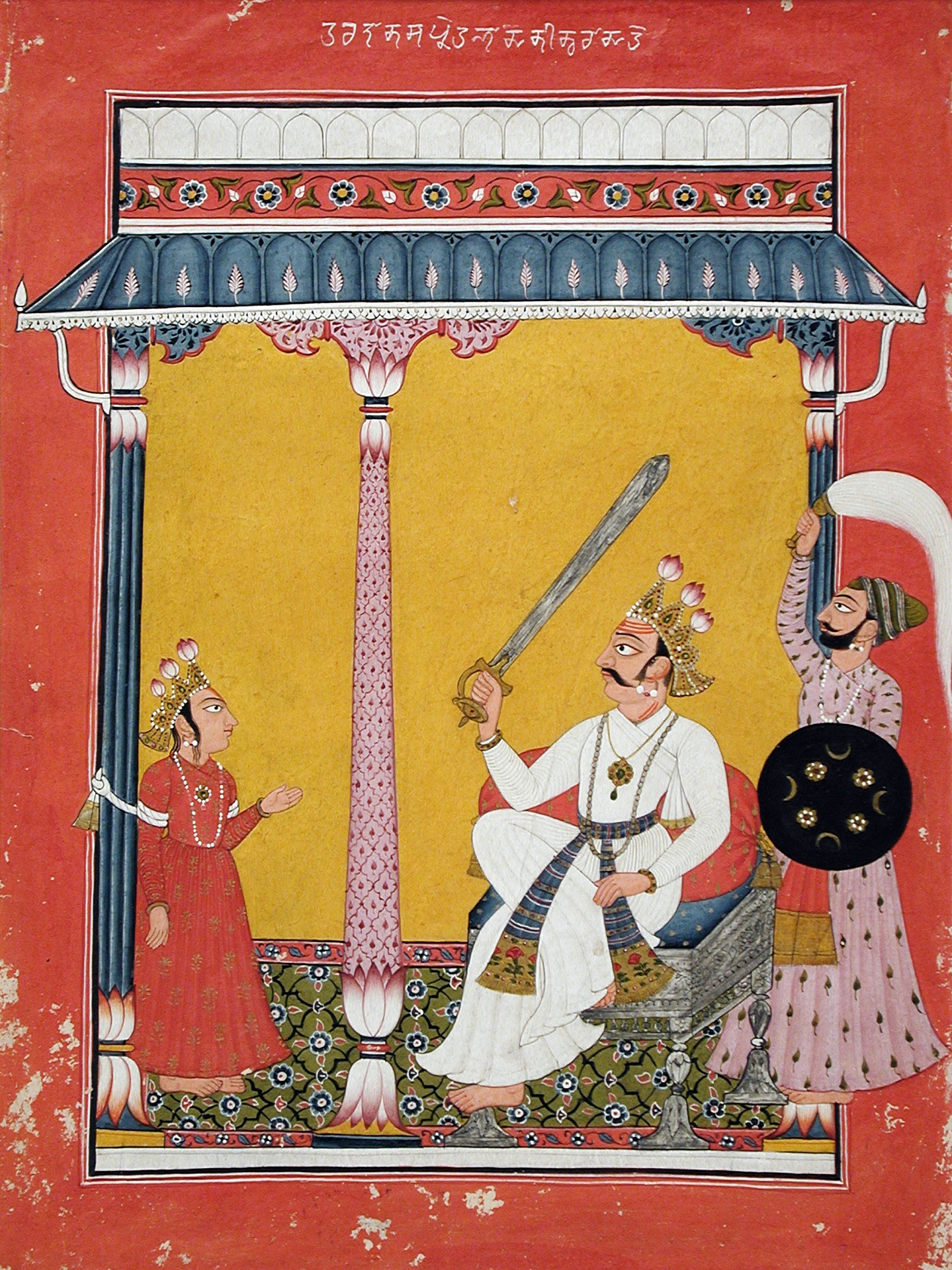
- 18th century painting depicting Hiranyakashipu seated on a throne, trying to kill his son, Prahlada (left).
- Affiliation: Asura, Daitya
- Predecessor: Hiranyaksha
- Successor: Prahlada
- Weapon: Mace

Genealogy
- Parents: Kashyapa (father); Diti (mother)
- Siblings: Hiranyaksha (younger brother), Holika (younger sister)
- Consort: Kayadhu/Kamala
- Children: Son: Prahlada, Saṃhrāda, Anuhlada, Hlada, Shibi, and Bashkala from Kayadhu; Daughters: Divyadevi and Paulami (wives of sage Bhrigu) and Simhika from Kayadhu

Daitya Sequence
- Predecessor: Hiranyaksha
- Successor: Prahlada

Hiranyakashipu (Sanskrit: हिरण्यकशिपु, IAST: Hiraṇyakaśipu), was a daitya king of the asuras in the Puranas.

In Hinduism, Hiranyakashipu's younger brother, Hiranyaksha, was slain by the Varaha (boar) avatar of Vishnu. Angered by this, Hiranyakashipu decided to gain a boon of invulnerability by performing tapas to propitiate Brahma. After his subjugation of the three worlds, he was slain by the Narasimha (man-lion) avatar of Vishnu.

== Etymology ==
Hiranyakashipu literally translates to "person desiring wealth and material comforts" (hiranya "gold" kashipu "soft bed"), and is often interpreted as depicting one who is fond of wealth and sensual comforts. In the Puranas, however, it is also stated the name was derived from a golden throne called 'Hiranyakashipu' the asura sat in or nearby during the atiratra (soma) sacrifice.

== Legend ==
=== Birth ===
According to the Bhagavata Purana, Hiranyakashipu and Hiranyaksha are Vishnu's gatekeepers Jaya and Vijaya, born on earth as the result of a curse from the Four Kumaras. In the Satya Yuga, Hiranyakashipu and Hiranyaksha – together called the Hiranyas – were born to Diti (a daughter of Daksha) and sage Kashyapa. It is said that asuras were born to them as a result of their union at the time of dusk, which was said to be an inauspicious time for such a deed.

=== Austerities and Boons ===
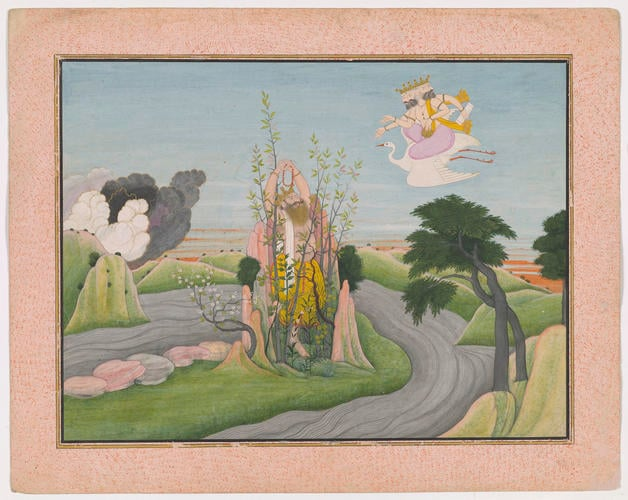
Illustration based on Canto 7, Chapter 3 of the Bhagvata Purana, showing Hiranyakashipu performing severe penance to please Brahma. His penance has started a fire, seen on the left.

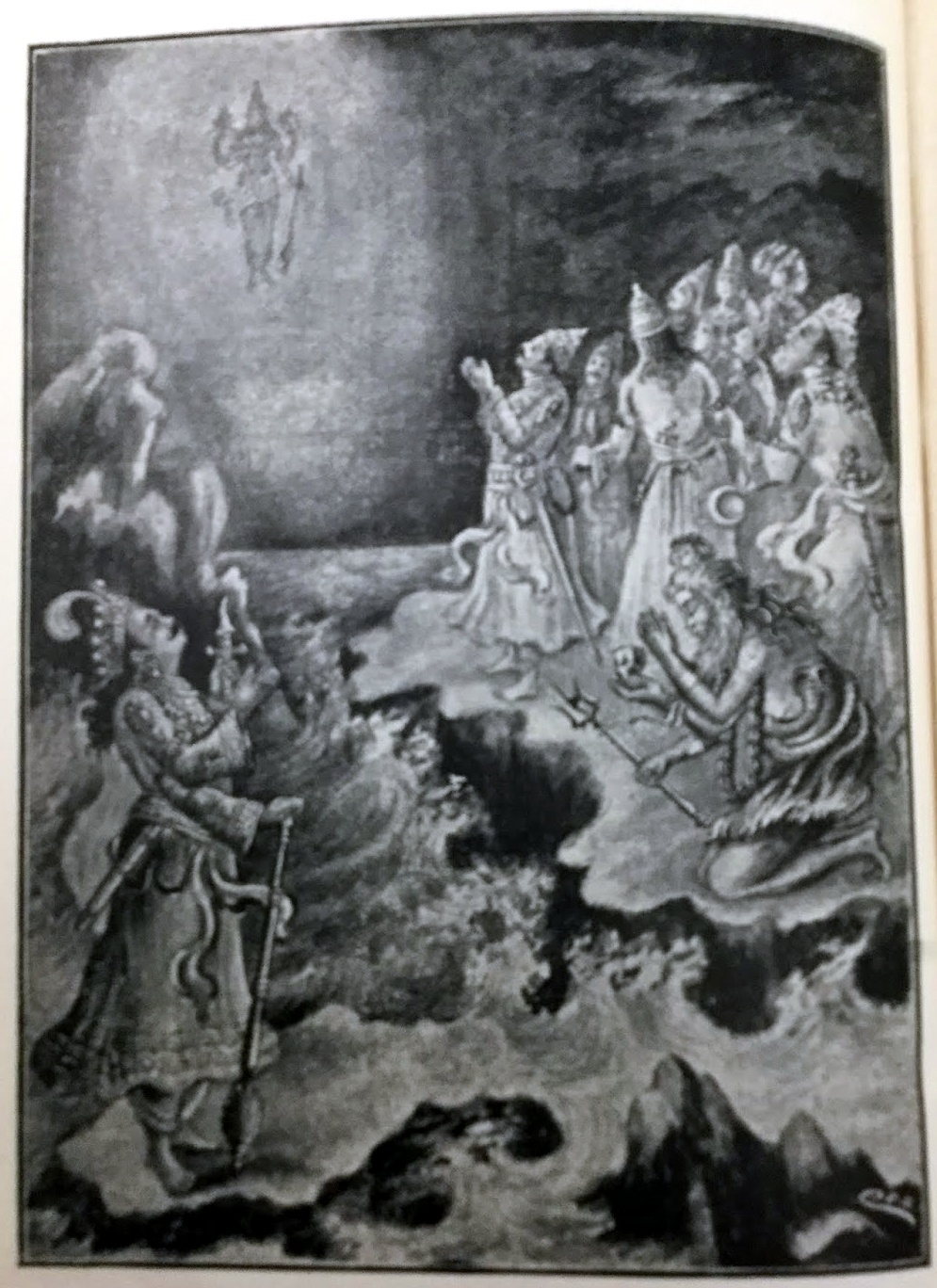
Devas approach Vishnu requesting Him to control Hiranyakashipu

After Hiranyakashipu's younger brother, Hiranyaksha, was slain by the hands of the Varaha avatar of Vishnu, Hiranyakashipu came to hate Vishnu. He decided to kill him by gaining a boon of invulnerability from Brahma. Hiranyakashipu traveled to the valley of the Mandara Mountain, where he began an extreme form of penance. He stood motionless with his arms raised upward and his gaze fixed toward the sky. The Harivamsha Purana states that Hiranyakashyipu did severe austerities for 11,500 years while observing the vow of silence in water. As Hiranyakashipu remained immobile for so long, his body became enveloped by grass, bamboo, and an anthill. Ants and other insects consumed his skin, flesh, fat, and blood, leaving only his skeleton. Despite this, his life force continued to circulate within his bones. Over time, his austerities became so intense that a blazing fire emanated from his head. This heat spread throughout the three worlds, causing the abode of the devas to tremble. This forced the devas to abandon their abodes and seek help from Brahma.

Hiranyakashipu's plan seemed to work initially, with Brahma becoming pleased by Hiranyakashipu's austerities. Brahma appeared before Hiranyakashipu and offered him a boon of his choice. But when Hiranyakashipu asked for immortality, Brahma refused. Hiranyakashipu then made the following request:

O my lord, O best of the givers of benediction, if you will kindly grant me the benediction I desire, please let me not meet death from any of the living entities created by you.

Grant me that I not die within any residence or outside any residence, during the daytime or at night, nor on the ground or in the sky. Grant me that my death not be brought by any being created by you, nor by any weapon, nor by any human being or animal.

Grant me that I not meet the death from any entity, living or nonliving. Grant me, further, that I not be killed by any demigod or demon, or by any great snake from the lower planets. Since no one can kill you in the battlefield, you have no competitor. Therefore, grant me the benediction that I too may have no rival. Give me sole lordship over all the living entities and presiding deities, and give me all the glories obtained by that position. Furthermore, give me all the mystic powers attained by long austerities and the practice of yoga, for these cannot be lost at any time.

The Shiva Purana mentions the boon with a slight variation, where Hiranyakashipu asked Brahma that he would be invulnerable to weapons, thunderbolts, mountains, trees, missiles, water, fire, or any creature created by him.

After receiving the boons, Hiranyakashipu felt invincible and conquered the three worlds, assuming the throne of Indra. According to the Skanda Purana, Hiranyakashipu ruled the universe for 107.28 million years, or 24.8 yugas.

=== Death ===
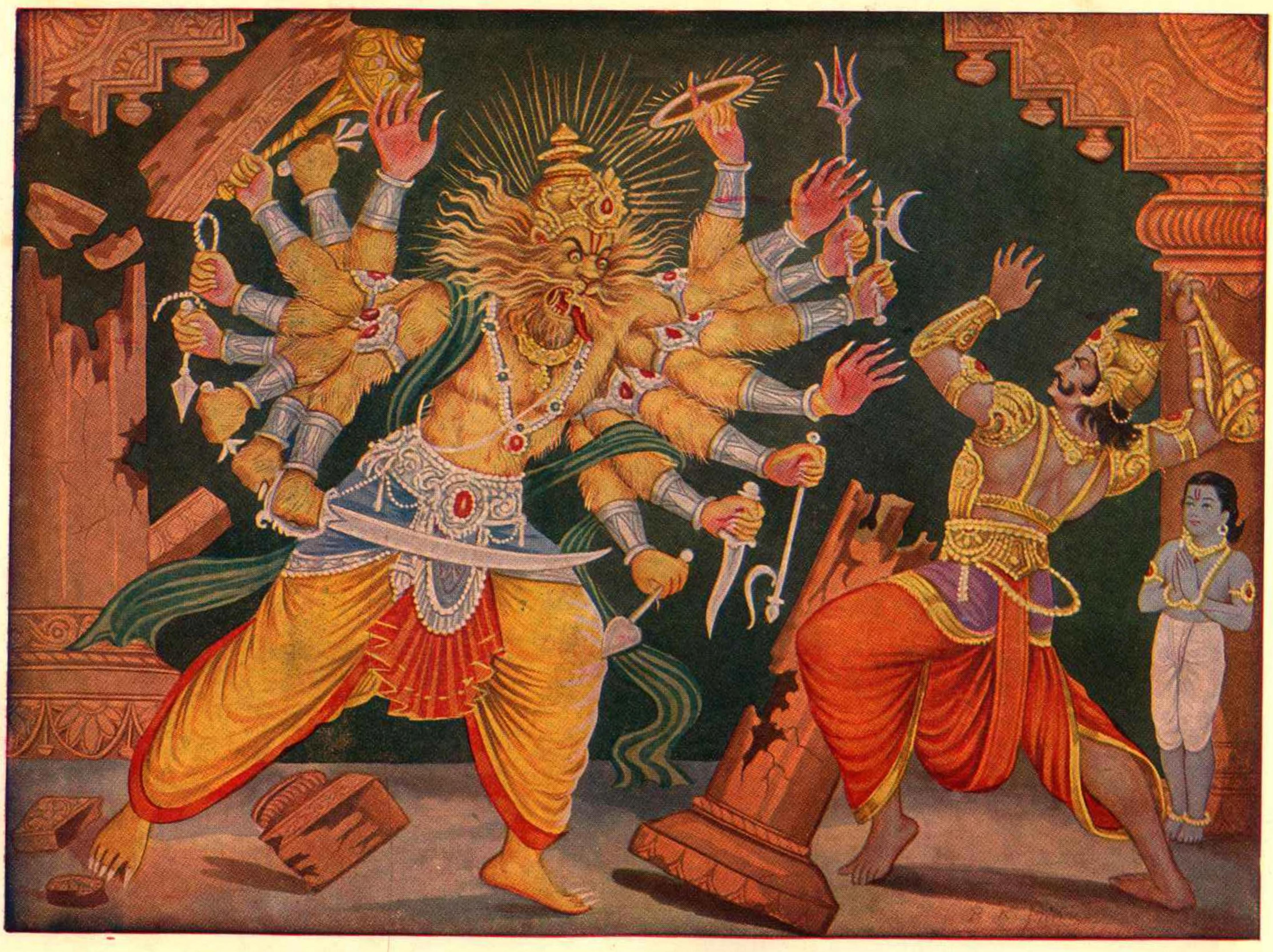
Hiranyakashipu wielding a mace against Narasimha

While Hiranyakashipu was performing tapas to be granted these boons, Indra and other devas attacked his home, seizing the opportunity in his absence. In response the divine sage Narada intervened to protect Hiranyakashipu's wife Kayadhu, whom he described as 'sinless'. Narada took responsibility of her in his hermitage, and while she was under his guidance, her unborn child (Hiranyakashipu's son) Prahlada became influenced by the spiritual instructions of the sage while still in his mother's womb. Later, growing as a child, Prahlada began to reap the harvest of Narada's prenatal training and gradually became recognised as a devout follower of Vishnu, much to his father's anguish.

Hiranyakashipu eventually became so angry and upset at his son's devotion to Vishnu (whom he saw as his mortal enemy) that he decided that he must kill him, but each time he attempted to kill the boy, Prahlada was protected by Vishnu's mystical power. When asked, Prahlada refused to acknowledge his father as the supreme lord of the universe, and claimed that Vishnu was all-pervading and omnipresent. To which Hiranyakashipu points to a nearby pillar and asked if 'his Vishnu' is in it:

"O most unfortunate Prahlada, you have always described a supreme being other than me, a supreme being who is above everything, who is the controller of everyone, and who is all-pervading. But where is He? If He is everywhere, then why is He not present before me in this pillar?"

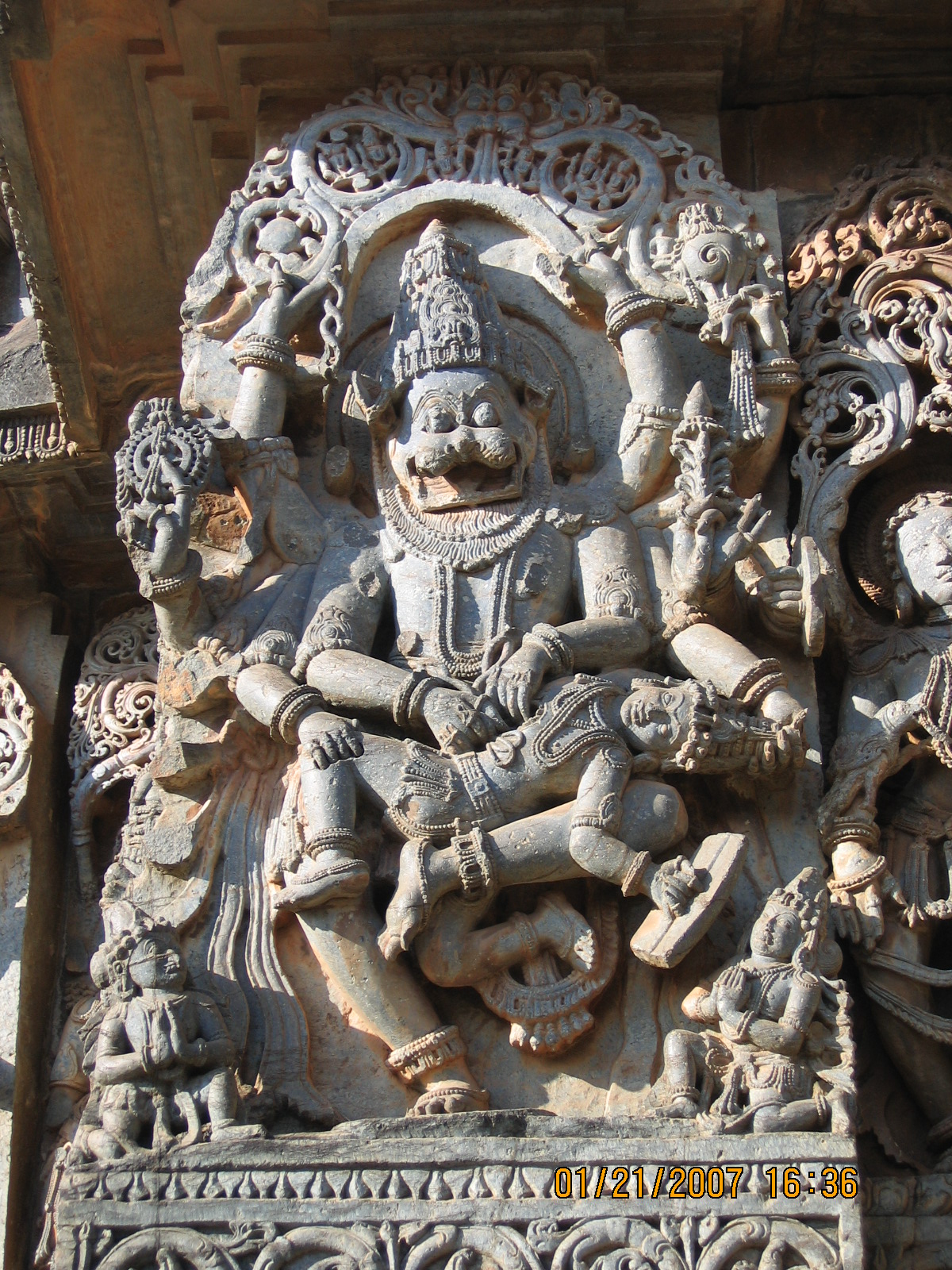
Vishnu as Narasimha kills Hiranyakashipu, stone sculpture from Halebidu, Karnataka

Prahlada then answered, "He is in the pillar, just as he is in the slightest dust." Hiranyakashipu, unable to control his anger, smashed the pillar with his mace. A tumultuous sound was heard, and Vishnu in the form of Narasimha appeared from the broken pillar and moved to attack Hiranyakashipu in defence of Prahlada.

Narasimha had appeared in circumstances that would allow him to slay the asura king. Hiranyakashipu could not be killed by human, deva, or animal, but Narasimha was none of these, as he was an incarnate that was part human and part animal. He attacked Hiranyakashipu at twilight (when it is neither day nor night) on the threshold of a courtyard (neither indoors nor outdoors), and placed the asura on his thighs (neither earth nor in the air). Using his claws (neither living nor non-living things), he disemboweled and killed the asura.

Alternative Puranic accounts, like the Harivamsha, describe Narasimha arriving to slay Hiranyakashipu accompanied by an attendant named Omkara. In these versions, Narasimha does not emerge from a pillar but instead enters Hiranyakashipu's assembly hall alongside Omkara. Despite Prahlad's attempts to persuade his father that Narasimha is none other than Vishnu, Hiranyakashipu dismisses the warning, leading to a violent battle between Narasimha and the demon king. The Kurma Purana has a related variant in which Prahlada initially confronts Narasimha upon his father's command but later learns and accepts his divinity. In both versions. Prahlada's efforts to convince Hiranyakashipu fail, and Hiranyakashipu is slain in battle by Narasimha.

Even after Hiranyakashipu's death, none of the gods and the demigods present were able to placate Narasimha's fury. So, all the gods and goddesses called his consort, the goddess Lakshmi, but she was also unable to do so. Then, at the request of Brahma, Prahlada was presented before Narasimha, who was finally calmed by the prayers of his devotee.

=== Redemption ===
According to the Bhagavata Purana, after the death of Hiranyakashipu, Narasimha expresses affection toward Prahlada and offers him boons, which Prahlada declines for himself. Instead, Prahlada requests a benediction for his slain father, asking that Hiranyakashipu be freed from the consequences of his faults and transgressions. Narasimha assures Prahlada that Hiranyakashipu has already been purified, both through his kinship with Prahlada, described as a model devotee, and through contact with Narasimha’s own divine body at the moment of his death. Gupta and Valpey identify this episode as answering the primary interlocutor of the Bhagavata Purana, King Parikṣit’s question about why God appears partial to devotees while acting with hostility toward the asuras. The text resolves the tension by asserting that divine hostility functions as a mode of purification: through direct contact with God, even his enemies are sanctified and admitted into Vaikuntha.

== Hiranyakashipu in the Uttara Ramayana ==
In the Uttara Kanda of the Ramayana, Hiranyakashipu is referenced through an episode involving his great-grandson Mahabali. While touring the netherworlds (Patalalokas), Ravana meets Mahabali, who resides in Sutalaloka following his surrender to Vishnu's Vamana avatar. During their discussion, Mahabali draws Ravana's attention to a massive jeweled earring (kundala) lying nearby, identifying it as an ornament once worn by his ancestor Hiranyakashipu. Mahabali asks Ravana to lift the earring. Ravana is unable to move it and collapses under its weight. Mahabali explains that the earring fell to the ground when Hiranyakashipu was killed by Vishnu's Narasimha avatar and implies that if Ravana cannot even move the earrings of Hiranyakashipu, he cannot hope to win against the deity (Vishnu) who destroyed him.

== Location identification ==
Narsimha Temple at Sikligarh Dharhara in Purnia district of Bihar state of India has the 1411 long Manikya stambha (pillar), from which the Lord Vishnu manifested Narsimha (half lion and half man) avatara. This temple complex has ruins which is said to be the fort of Hiranyakashipu and a cave where Lord Shiva is said to have meditated. The temple has a unique tradition, after Holika Dahan (Holi bonfire) at the temple the ashes are sprayed in the air as the sign of victory of good over evil, and people play Holi with the Holika Dahan bonfire ashes and this tradition is locally called the dhurkhel (hindi: धुरखेल).

== Holi ==
One of Hiranyakashipu's attempts to kill his son Prahlada was to have him sit on a burning pyre with his aunt Holika. Holika had a special boon that prevented her from being harmed by fire. Prahlada chanted Vishnu's name and in the battle of good against evil, Holika was burnt down but nothing happened to Prahlada. The survival of Prahlada is celebrated in Hinduism as the festival of Holi.

== See also ==
- Bhagavata Purana
- Narasimha
- Prahlada
- Vishnu Purana

== Footnotes ==
| Preceded by Hiranyaksha | Daityas - | Succeeded by Prahlad |
