= Mahabali =

King in Hindu scriptures

- King of the Asuras
- Member of Chiranjivi
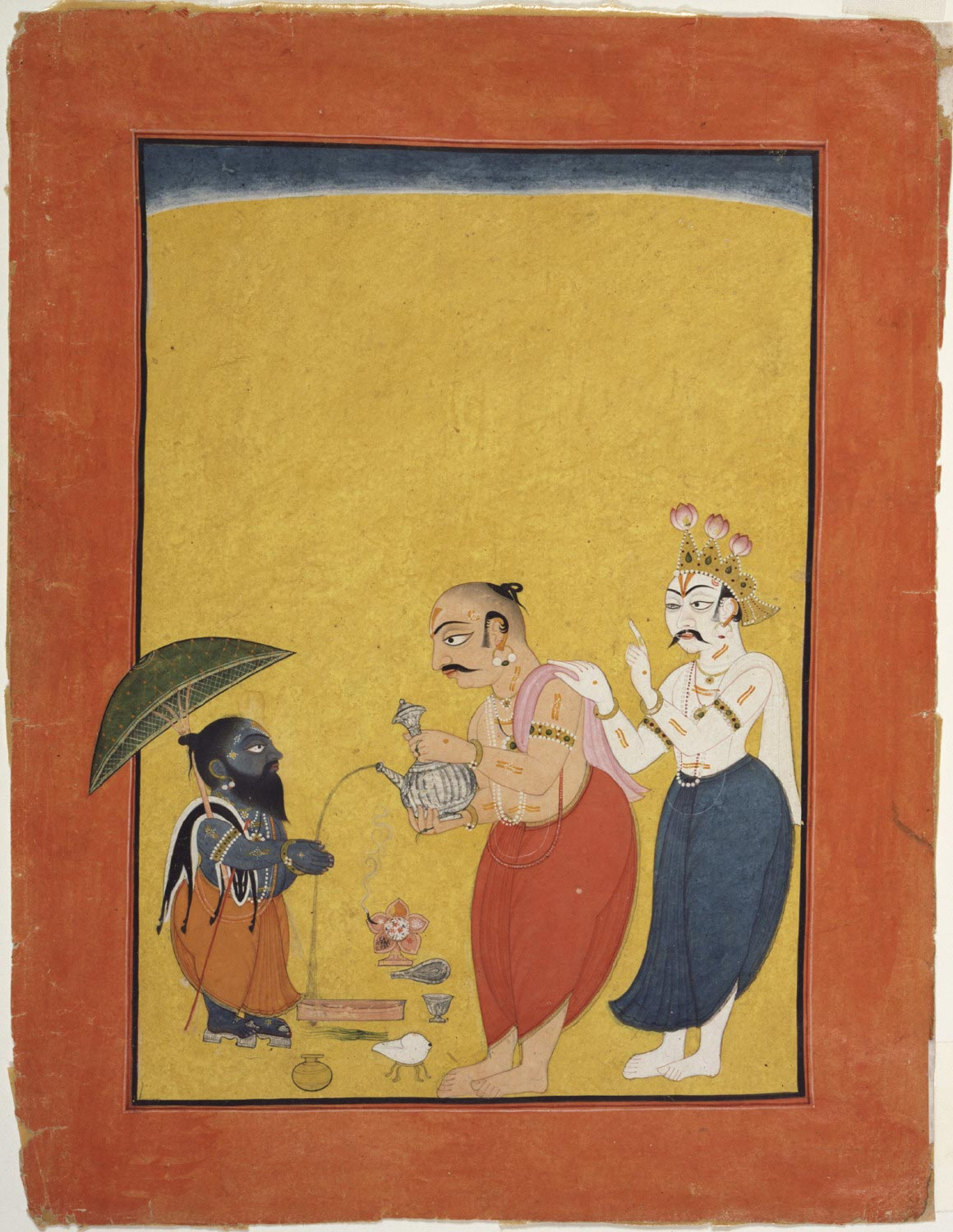
- Mahabali serves Vamana, while a suspicious Shukra tries to stop him. Painting from Mankot, Jammu and Kashmir, c. 1700–1725.
- Affiliation: Daitya, Asura, Mahajanas; Devotee of Vishnu
- Predecessor: Virochana
- Successor: Banasura
- Abode: Sutala loka

Genealogy
- Parents: Virochana (father), Devi Vishalakshi (mother)
- Spouse: Vindhyavali (Note: also known as Ashrama)
- Children: 100 sons including Banasura, Namasu, Sahasika, and Shakuni; 2 daughters Ratnamala/Yagyamala and Vajrajvala (wife of Kumbhakarna)

Mahabali (IAST: Mahābalī), also known as Bali, Indrasenan, or Māveli, is a daitya king featured in Hinduism. He is the grandson of Prahlada, and a descendant of the sage Kashyapa. There are many versions of his legend in ancient texts such as the Ramayana, Mahabharata, Shatapatha Brahmana, and many Puranas. According to Hindu literature, he was blessed to be one of the Chiranjivi, a group of seven immortals, by Vamana, an avatar of Vishnu and reigns in Sutala loka.

It is believed that Mahabali will become the King of Svarga (heaven) in the next Manvantara. In Kerala, Mahabali is considered to be the noblest and most prosperous ruler, who transformed his kingdom into a heavenly place. His legend is a major part of the annual festival Onam in the state of Kerala, and it is also celebrated in Tamilnadu, Maharashtra, Karnataka, Gujarat, Telangana, and Andhra as Balipratipada, Balipādyami, or Bali pādva (the third day of Deepavali and first day of Kartika month).

== Hinduism ==
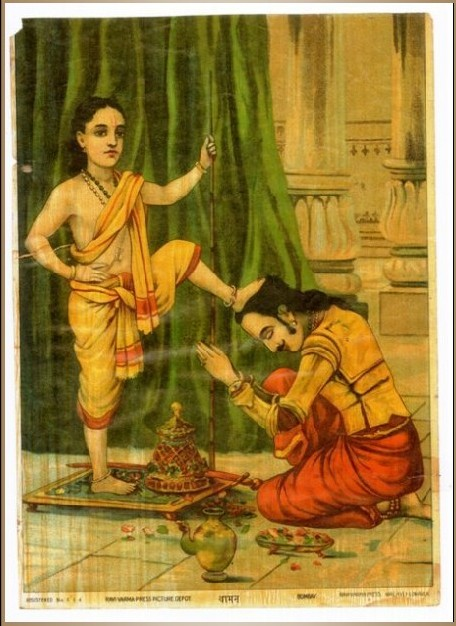
Vamana avatar of Vishnu stomps on Bali's head, and sends him to Patala

Mahabali is described in early Hindu texts as a benevolent and generous king. He ruled without discrimination, and his people were honest, healthy, and happy under his rule. Mahabali also temporarily possessed the amrita (nectar of eternal life) obtained by the asuras. The amrita allowed his subjects to bring him back to life after his death in one of the wars between suras (devas) and asuras. Mahabali was, thus, immune from death. After many wars, the invincible Bali had conquered heaven and earth. The suras (devas) approached Vishnu to save them from complete obliteration. Vishnu refused to join the devas in violence against Mahabali, because Mahabali is a benevolent king and his own devotee. To restore the natural order, he incarnated as the dwarf Brahmin avatar, Vamana. While Mahabali was performing the ashvamedha sacrifice to celebrate his victories and giving away gifts to everyone, Vamana approached him and requested "three steps of land". Mahabali granted him this gift, despite warnings from Shukra, who had realised Vamana's true identity. Vamana then metamorphosed into Vishnu's colossal trivikrama form, the first foot encompassing all of heaven in one step and the earth with the second foot. When rhetorically asked where he might take his promised third step, Mahabali accepted his fate and offered his own head. In the Bhagavata Purana, King Bali is considered an exemplary devotee (Bhagvata), due to his sacrifice of offering his kingdom and his own self to Vishnu. Some Hindu texts state that Mahabali was banished to patala (netherworld), some state he was dragged there by Garuda, in others he entered heaven with the touch of Vishnu, while another version states he became Chiranjivi (immortal). Others even have Bali admitted into Vaikuntha, which was an even higher place than the realm of the devas.

In other versions of the story, when Vamana asks where to place his next step, Mahabali offers his own head to him because he realizes that he is an avatar of god Vishnu. Vishnu then sends the king to sutala, but seeing Mahabali's gesture, he is pleased and wants Mahabali to ask for a boon. Mahabali wishes for Vishnu to stay with him in his palace in sutala loka and give him the privilege of serving him. However, when Goddess Lakshmi finds out, she does not approve. She goes to sutala loka, makes Mahabali her brother, and requests him to let her husband come back to her in Vaikuntha. In response to this situation, Vishnu decides that he will visit Mahabali's palace every year and rest/sleep there for four months. To ensure that the world continues to function while he is resting in Sutala loka, Vishnu gave his responsibility of running the world to Shiva. Those four months, during which Vishnu rests and Shiva runs the world, are known as Chaturmas. In this way, Mahabali played an important part in the start of Chaturmas.

According to one story, Vishnu granted Bali a boon whereby he could return to his homeland once every year. The harvest festivals of Balipratipada and Onam are celebrated to mark his yearly homecoming. Literature and inscriptions in Hindu temples suggest that these festivals, featuring colourful decorations, lighted lamps, gift giving, feasts and community events, have been popular in India for more than a millennium. Bali is also featured in the Ramayana where Ravana tries to free him from Patala, but is unable to.

Mahabhali had a wife named Vindhyavalli, who was also referred to as Ashrama. With her he had many sons, including the Shiva devotee Bana (Banasura) and Namasu (Prince Namuchi). It is believed that Vindhyavalli once saved Bana from the wrath of Krishna.

== Jainism ==
King Mahabali is also found in the mythologies of Jainism. He is the sixth of nine Prativasudevas (Prati-narayanas, anti-heroes). He is depicted as an evil king who schemed and attempted to rob Purusha's wife. He is defeated and killed by Purusha. In Jain mythology, the antagonists to Mahabali are the two sons born to King Mahasiva (Mahasiras): Ananda (the sixth Baladeva) and Purusapundarika (the sixth Vasudeva).

Mahabali is also mentioned in Jain inscriptions, where the patron compares the defeated evil opponents of the current king to Mahabali. For example, in the Girnar inscriptions of Gujarat dated to about 1231 CE (1288 Vikrama era), minister Vastupala of the Chaulukya dynasty is praised as a great king by Jains, and the inscriptions connect him to Mahabali because Vastupala gave much charity. Some excerpts from the inscriptions are:

In olden times Mahabali was pressed down by the foot of Vishnu, the enemy of the demons, from the earth; now the same is done by the hand of Vastupala,...
O Vastupala, Mahabali has sent thee a message that he has been much pleased by hearing from Narada, who visits the three worlds, that though frequently solicited thou dost not extend thy anger to the needy,...
By the famous minister Vastupala watering the earth with nectarial charities, the pride of Mahabali and Kalpataru has been greatly lowered...
Let there be continuous salutation to holy Mahabali and Karna, whose charity though unseen has been the object of so much fame; consequently the people are worthy of worship, and the great minister Vastupala's charity which the people see with their eyes so great that even the world itself can scarcely contain it.

Mahabali is a common name and found in other contexts. For example, in Jain history, Mahabali is the name of the son of Bahubali, who was given Bahubali's kingdom before Bahubali became a monk.

== Buddhism ==
Bali appears in several Buddhist sutras, such as the Dānapāramitā Sūtra, the Ratnamegha Sūtra, and the Lotus Sutra; where he is seen among the audience who listens to the Buddha's discourses.

The Kāraṇḍavyūha Sūtra features an extensive dialogue between Bali and the bodhisattva Avalokiteśvara that occurred during the life of the Buddha Viśvabhū. Bali relates his story of being imprisoned in the underworld by Nārāyaṇa. The asura king repents for his misdeeds and praises the qualities of Avalokiteśvara and the pure land Sukhāvatī. Avalokiteśvara bestows a prediction that Bali will someday become a fully awakended buddha named Śrī who will lead the asuras in the Dharma.

Bali offers Avalokiteśvara "strings of pearls worth a hundred thousand silver coins and diadems adorned with various jewels." Before leaving his abode, Avalokiteśvara gives a teaching about how humans must leave Jambudvīpa upon death and are subject to the punishments of King Yama in hell. He then tells Bali of the importance of cultivating merit in this life.

== Veneration ==
For people in Kerala, Mahabali is remembered fondly as a great and benevolent king. Keralites celebrate the festival Onam to commemorate the glorious days of Mahabali. They believe that Mahabali, once ruled Kerala. During Onam, the asura king is believed to return to see his people.

In Karnataka, Tamilnadu, Maharashtra, Gujarat, Andhra Pradesh, and Telangana, several people believe that Mahabali was an ancient king. Special puja is offered during the third day of Deepavali and first day of Kartika month, which they call, 'Bali padwa', ' Bali pratipada', and 'Bali Padyami'. In coastal Karnataka, people offer a special dish to the being on a plate prepared with bamboo tree sticks, along with a lamp, and through the medium of a Tulu folklore song, request him to accept their offerings. People believe that on the third day of the festival, the king comes out of Patala for a day to see his kingdom.

The town of Mahabalipuram in Tamil Nadu is also associated with him.

In Hinduism in Thailand and Tai folk religion call him is Chao Krung Bhali (เจ้ากรุงพาลี). He is regarded as chief of deity serve as guardians of the earth. (พระภูมิเจ้าที่) deity guardians of the trees (รุกขเทวดา) and Tutelary deity. (เทพารักษ์) which deity these types same match with Grāmadevatā and Kuladevata in Hinduism., statue of his most important located in Ho kaew sal Phra bhum (หอแก้วศาลพระภูมิ) which is Spirit house for deity guardian of Grand Palace which is on the side of Phra Thinang Chai Chumpol but located in the area of the Inner royal Court (accommodation of Consort, concubine with daughter unmarried and woman attendant)., Him will receive special worship during the old Thai new year festival (เทศกาลตรุษไทย) according Lunar calendar (around the end of the month March to early April) before the Songkran festival., by inviting statue of his with statue other in Spirit house for deity guardian Grand Palace., Come to worship with Siam Devadhiraj which was regarded as the chairman of chief deity guardian of Grand Palace., which accompanying ceremony in Phra Thinang Phaisan Thaksin annually by Monarchy of Thailand or agent of Monarchy of Thailand. As for the Tai folk religion He was generally worshiped together with deity serve as guardians of the earth., deity guardians of the trees and Tutelary deity. by his famous statue and Spirit house of him located in San Chao Krung Bhali (ศาลเจ้ากรุงพาลี) in Noen Phra sud district in Mueang Rayong district Rayong province which has been praised by indigenous people to be Tutelary deity guardian of community.

== Literature ==
The Sapta Chiranjivi Stotram is a mantra that is featured in Hindu literature:

अश्वत्थामा बलिर्व्यासो हनुमांश्च विभीषण:।
कृप: परशुरामश्च सप्तैतै चिरञ्जीविन:॥
सप्तैतान् संस्मरेन्नित्यं मार्कण्डेयमथाष्टमम्।
जीवेद्वर्षशतं सोपि सर्वव्याधिविवर्जितः॥ aśvatthāmā balirvyāsō hanumāṁśca vibhīṣaṇaḥ।
kṛpaḥ paraśurāmaśca saptaitai cirañjīvinaḥ॥
saptaitān saṁsmarēnnityaṁ mārkaṇḍēyamathāṣṭamam।
jīvēdvarṣaśataṁ sopi sarvavyādhivivarjitaḥ॥

— Sapta Chiranjivi Stotram

The mantra states that the remembrance of the eight immortals (Ashwatthama, Mahabali, Vyasa, Hanuman, Vibhishana, Kripa, Parashurama, and Markandeya) offers one freedom from ailments and longevity.

Sudheer Maurya: Bali Ka Raaj Aaye (2019) Hindi Novel, Aman Prkashan, ISBN 9388260341

== See also ==
- Vamana
- Onam
- Rakshasa
- Chiranjivi
- Balipratipada
- Prahalada
- Virochana
- Belus (Assyrian)
- Beli Mawr
- Vindhyavalli
- *Deh₂nu

== Notes ==
=== Citations ===
Preceded by Virochana	Daityas unknown	Succeeded by Banasura
