= Prahlada =

Legendary devotee of the Hindu god Vishnu

- King of the Asuras
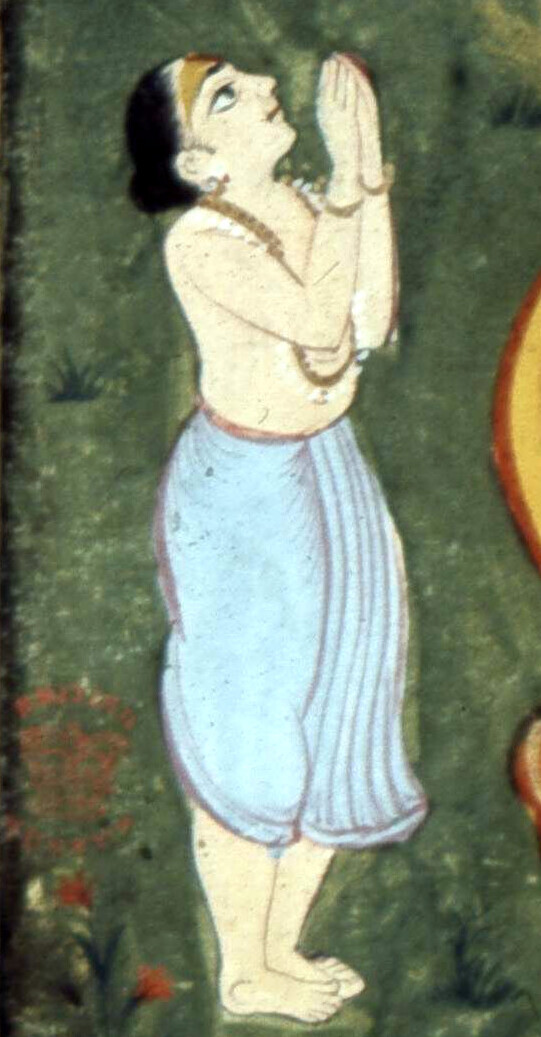
- 17th-century painting of Prahlada
- Devanagari: प्रह्लाद
- Affiliation: Vaishnavism; Asura; Devotee of Vishnu
- Predecessor: Hiranyakashipu and Hiranyaksha
- Successor: Virochana
- Texts: Bhagavata Purana, Vishnu Purana; Yoga Vasistha; Kurma Purana; Vamana Purana; Narasimha Purana
- Gender: Male

Genealogy
- Parents: Hiranyakashipu (father); Kayadhu (mother)
- Siblings: Saṃhlāda, Anuhlāda, Śibi, and Bāṣkala (step brothers)
- Spouse: Dhriti
- Children: Virochana (son), Virochanā or Rechana (daughter)

Prahlada (Sanskrit: प्रह्लाद, romanized: Prahlāda) is an asura prince in Hindu scriptures. He is known for his staunch devotion to Vishnu. He was rescued from his father, the asura king Hiranyakashipu by Narasimha, the half-man and half-lion avatar of Vishnu.

Prahlada is described as a pious boy, known for his innocence and bhakti towards Vishnu. Despite the abusive nature of his father, Hiranyakashipu, and his uncle and aunt, Hiranyaksha and Holika, he continued to worship Vishnu. Thus, in order to protect Prahlada, Vishnu took the form of Varaha to kill his paternal uncle Hiranyaksha by piercing and crushing him. Thereafter, Vishnu saved Prahlad from his paternal aunt Holika, by burning her to ashes. Following this, Vishnu took the form of Narasimha and disembowelled Hiranyakashipu to save Prahlada and the universe from destruction and chaos.

== Legend ==
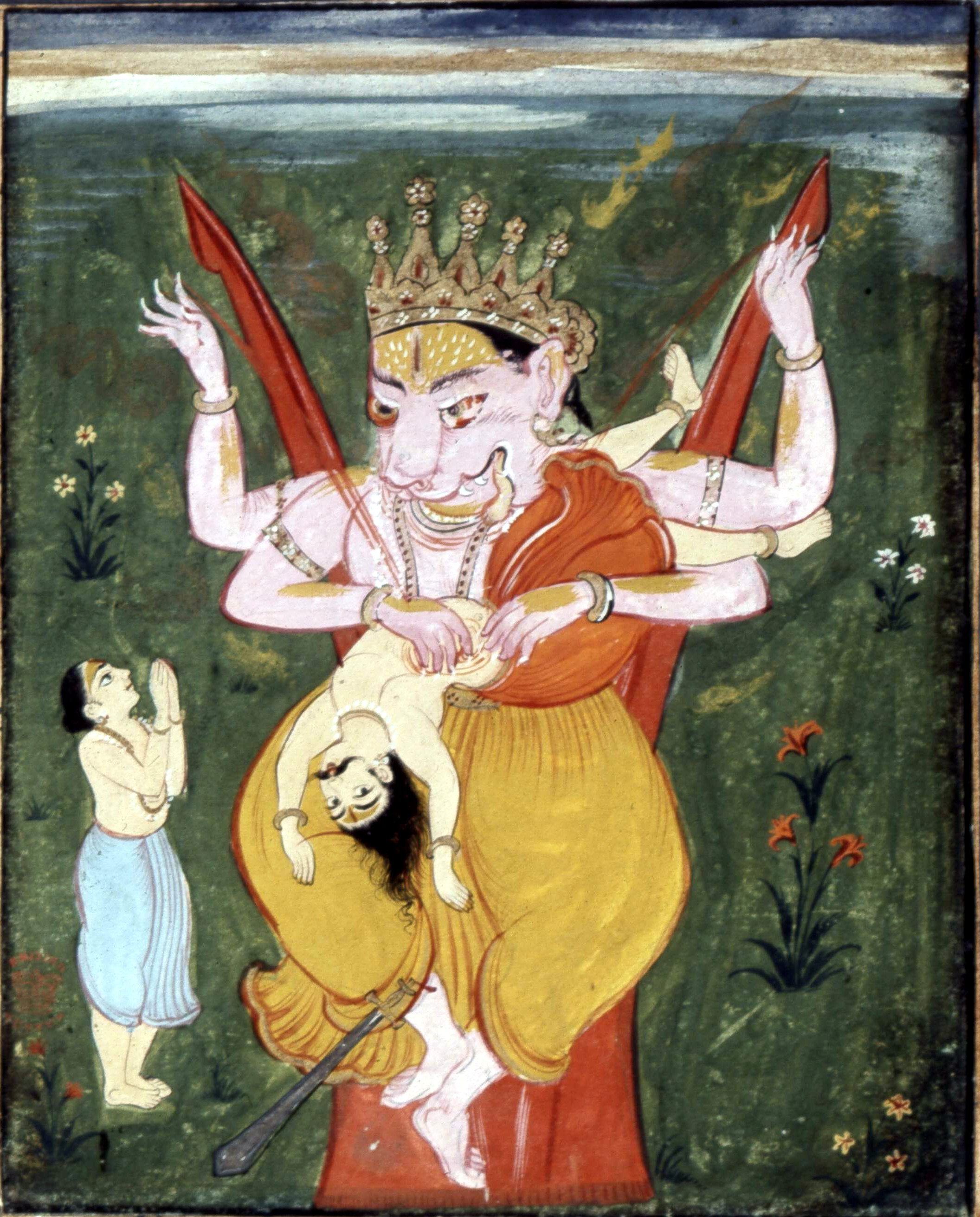
Prahlada prays to Narasimha as Narasimha disembowels and kills Hiranyakashipu.

Prahlada was born to Kayadhu and Hiranyakashipu, the ruler of the asuras, who had been granted a boon from Brahma that he could not be slain by anything born from a womb, neither by a man nor an animal, neither during the day nor at night, neither indoors nor outdoors, neither on land nor in the air nor in water, and with no man-made weapon. After Prahlada is persecuted by Hiranyakashipu for his bhakti, he is finally saved by Narasimha, the fourth avatar of Vishnu. The word "Narasimha" is derived from the Sanskrit words "Nara", meaning man, and "Simha", meaning lion. Thus, Vishnu took the form of a part-human, part-lion and killed Hiranyakashipu.

After the death of his father, Prahlada ascended the throne and ruled peacefully and virtuously.

His father despised Prahlada's spiritual inclination and tried to warn him against offending him, as he had a vendetta against Vishnu. Despite several warnings from his father, Prahlada continued to worship Vishnu instead. The child was successful in converting other students of the asura clan into Vaishnavism by teaching them the Narayana mantra.

An actress in Kochi, Kerala performs the story of Prahlada

His father then decided to poison Prahlada, but he survived. Thereafter, when the daitya soldiers attacked their prince with weapons, Prahlada informed them that their efforts were futile since Vishnu resided within them. Hiranyakashipu then had Prahlada trampled by the aṣṭadiggajas, the eight elephants who bear the weight of the earth, but their tusks were broken to bits upon contact with him, and so, they retreated. Following this, Prahlada was placed in a room with venomous, dark snakes, but they made a bed for him with their bodies.

Prahalada was then thrown from a valley into a river but was saved by Bhumi, the companion of Vishnu and Lakshmi. Holika, the sister of Hiranyakashipu, was blessed with a boon of being invulnerable to fire. Hiranyakashipu put Prahlada on the lap of Holika as she sat on a pyre. Prahlada prayed to Vishnu to keep him safe. Holika was burned to ashes and killed, whilst Prahlada remained untouched. This event is celebrated as the Hindu festival of Holi.

The asuras Shambara and Vayu were then tasked with slaying the prince, but both of them were driven away and were killed by Vishnu. The boy was entrusted to Shukra, who educated him regarding his duties, the sciences, and justice, and was returned to his father after he was deemed to have become humble. The asura king once again broached the topic of deities with his son, only to discover that the latter had never wavered in his faith. Finally, the wicked daitya commanded all the daityas and the danavas to collect all the mountains of the earth to construct a barrier over the boy in the ocean, so that his son would be submerged for a year. Even though they spread over him for a thousand kilometres, Prahlada, with bound hands and feet, prayed to Vishnu. Thus, Vishnu granted him a number of boons and moved all the mountains of the earth to their places from the seas. He then moved the asuras away and had Prahlada returned to prostrate before his father, who was left bewildered.

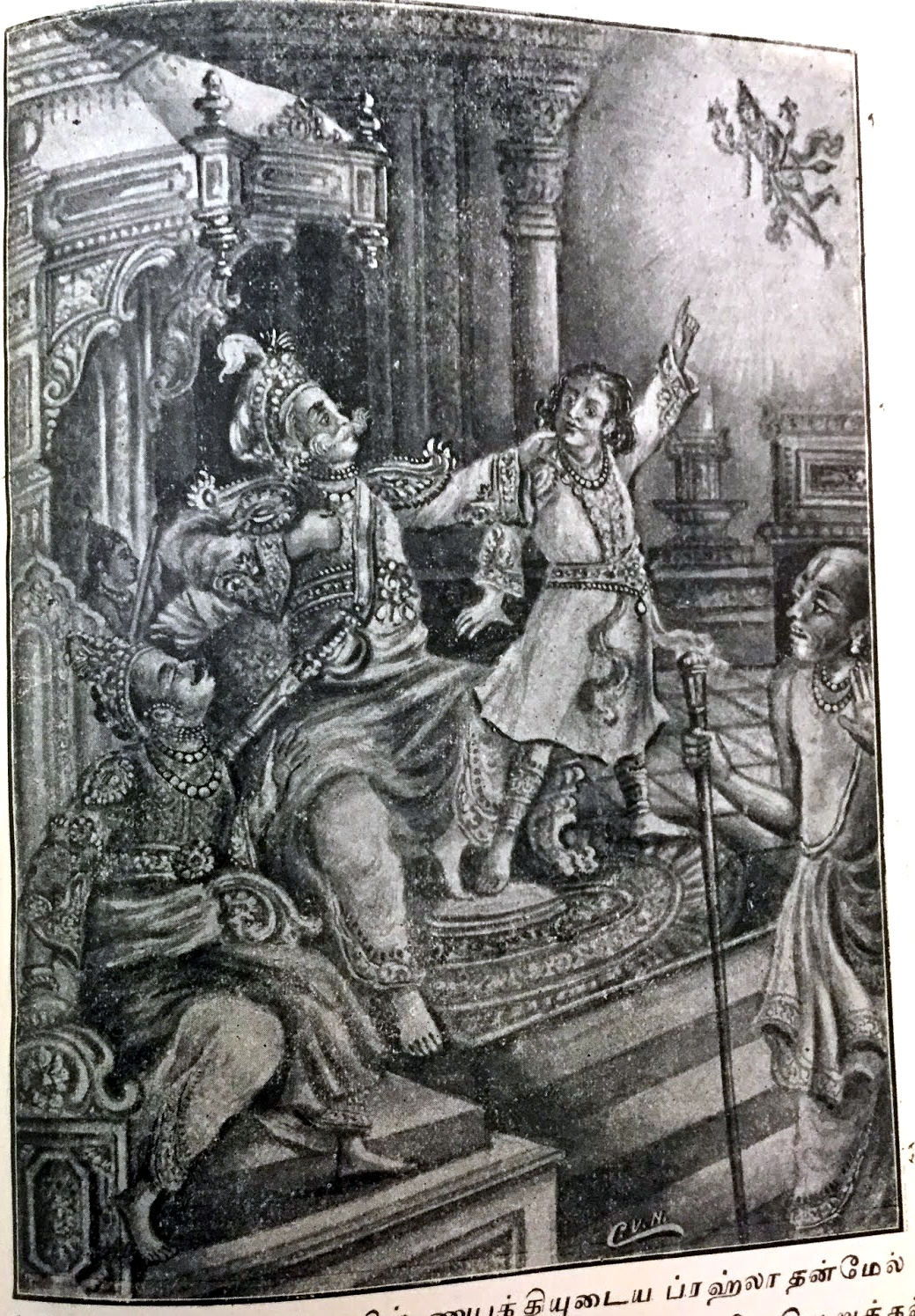
Prahlada shows his father that Vishnu exists everywhere

After tolerating repeated abuse from Hiranyakashipu, Prahlada was eventually saved by Narasimha, who emerged from within a stone pillar in the palace. He then caught and placed Hiranyakashipu on his thighs, to then disembowel and kill him with his sharp nails. Notably, the death scene unfolded at the threshold to his home at dusk, where Hiranyakashipu was slain by the nails of a half man, half animal thus, nullifying all of Hiranyakashipu's boons of virtual immortality.

Prahlada then became the king of the asuras and attains a place in the abode of Vishnu and Lakshmi (Vaikuntha) after his death.

== Literature ==
In the Bhagavad Gita (10.30) Krishna makes the following statement in regard to Prahlada, showing his favour towards him:

prahlādaścāsmi daityānāṁ kālaḥ kalayatāmaham .
mr̥gāṇāṁ ca mr̥gēndrō’haṁ vainatēyaśca pakṣiṇām .. 10-30..

— Bhagavad Gita, Chapter 10, Verse 30

Translation: "Among the Daityas, I am the great devotee Prahlada and of calculators, I am Time; among quadrupeds, I am the lion; and among birds, I am Garuda."

In the Vishnu Purana, the sage Parasara ends narrating the tale of Prahlada to Maitreya with the following proclamation:

Such, Maitreya, was Prahlada, the wise and faithful worshipper of Vishnu, of whom you wished to hear; and such was his miraculous power. Whoever listens to the history of Prahlada is immediately cleansed from their sins: the iniquities that they commit, by night or by day, shall be expiated by once hearing, or once reading, the history of Prahlada. The perusal of this history on the day of full moon, of new moon, or on the eighth or twelfth day of the lunation, shall yield fruit equal to the donation of cattle. As Vishnu protected Prahlada in all the calamities to which he was exposed, so shall Vishnu protects them who listens constantly to the tale.

— Vishnu Purana, Book 1, Chapter 20

In Book 7 of the Bhagavata Purana, Prahlada describes bhakti as the only way to please God.

== Later life ==
=== Conquest of the three worlds ===
As the king of the asuras and asuris, Prahlada was even more powerful than his father Hiranyakashipu, because of his steadfast devotion to Vishnu, as well as the teachings of Shukra. He also enjoyed the love and respect of his subjects. Without lifting a single weapon and by virtue of his good behaviour, Prahlada conquered the three worlds easily, and Indra ran away from Svarga. In the disguise of a brahmin, Indra sought an audience with Prahlada and asked him to teach him his shila (good conduct and character) as a boon. Pleased with this, Prahalada offered Indra this boon but this meant that Prahlada was then robbed of his dharma.

=== Duel against Nara-Narayana ===
Prahlada once commanded the asuras to accompany him to the holy tirtha of Naimiṣa, where he hoped to see a vision of Vishnu. They went hunting along the banks of the Sarasvati River. Prahlada observed two ascetics with matted hair, bearing the bows of Sharanga and Ajagava. The asura king asked them why they held weapons while performing a penance, and the two ascetics responded that all those who held power were righteous in their conduct. One of the rishis assured the king that none of the three worlds could conquer them in a duel. Prahlada rose to the challenge. Nara fired arrows at the king with his Ajagava, but the latter was able to defeat him with his own gold-plated arrows. Prahlada employed the divine Brahmastra against Nara's Narayanastra. Seeing them neutralised in a mid-air collision, Prahlada wielded his mace against Narayana. His mace broke, and Prahlada found himself growing helpless and sought Vishnu's assistance. Vishnu told his devotee that the Nara-Narayana brothers were invincible as they were the sons of Yama and could only be conquered by devotion rather than combat. The king left the regency to Andhaka and erected an ashrama to propitiate Nara-Narayana and apologise for his folly.

=== War against Vishnu ===
According to the Kurma Purana, Prahlada always served thousands of brahmins daily. One day, Prahlada forgot to serve one brahmin. The latter cursed the asura, saying that he would forget Vishnu and become unrighteous. The curse soon came to fruition and Prahlada began ignoring the Vedas and the brahmins and deviated from the path of dharma. Determined to avenge his father's death, he waged war against Vishnu. When he was defeated, he realised his folly and ruled on the throne along with Andhaka as king.

=== Other conflicts and family ===
According to the Devi Bhagavata Purana, Prahlada was compelled to wage war against Indra and the devas by the daityas. In the fierce devasura war that ensued, Prahlada emerged as the victor. Fearing that the asura king would destroy the devas, Indra prayed to Parvati, and Prahlada responded in kind. Pleased, the goddess pacified both of them, and they returned to their abodes.

Prahlada was a direct descendant of Brahma through his father. Prahlada's son was Virochana, who was the father of Bali. The devas had Virochana killed by taking advantage of his generosity. Prahlada's daughter, Virochanā or Rechana, was married to the craftsman god Tvashta.

After a long life, Prahlada attained Vaikuntha. Prahlada's great-grandson was the thousand-armed Banasura, who was defeated in battle by Krishna in Mahabharata. Banasura’s daughter, Uṣā married Aniruddha, the grandson of Krishna.

== Pilgrimage sites ==
- India

The following sites are associated with Prahlāda and Narasiṁha as places of pilgrimage:

  - Andhra Pradesh
    - Ahobilam in Nandyal district
    - Kadiri in Sri Sathya Sai district
    - Lakshmi Narasimha swamy temple, Penna Ahobilam in Anantapur district
    - Malakonda in Nellore district
    - Simhachalam in Visakhapatnam
  - Bihar
    - Narsimha Temple at Sikligarh Dharhara in Purnia district state of India has the 1411 long Manikya stambha (pillar) also known as Prahlad Stambh, from which the Lord Vishnu manifested Narsimha (half lion and half man) avatara. This temple complex has ruins which are said to be the fort of Hiranyakashipu and a cave where Lord Shiva is said to have meditated. The temple has a unique tradition, after Holika Dahan (Holi bonfire) at the temple the ashes are sprayed in the air as the sign of victory of good over evil, and people play Holi with the Holika Dahan bonfire ashes and this tradition is locally called the dhurkhel (hindi: धुरखेल).
  - Maharashtra
    - Shri Laxmi Narsimha Temple, Narsingpur in Pune district
  - Telangana
    - Yadagirigutta Temple
  - Uttar Pradesh
    - Prahlad Ghat at Hardoi
  - West Bengal
    - Narasimha Temple wing at ISKON Temple of Vedic Planetarium at Mayapur in Nadia district
- Pakistan:
  - Prahladpuri Temple, Multan

== In dance ==
Prahallada Nataka is a traditional play from Odisha based on a text by Raja Ramakrusna Chhotaraya, King of Jalantara, a small kingdom in former southern Odisha.

== In popular culture ==
The story of Prahlada has been the theme of various films.

Year	Title	Language	Ref.
1917	Bhakta Pralhad	Silent	
1932	Bhakta Prahlada	Telugu	
1939	Prahalada	Tamil	
1941	Prahlada	Malayalam	
1942	Bhaktha Prahlada	Telugu	
1942	Bhakta Prahlada	Kannada	
1946	Bhakta Prahlad	Hindi	
1958	Bhakta Prahlad	Assamese	
1958	Bhakta Prahlada	Kannada	
1967	Bhakta Prahlada	Telugu	
1972	Hari Darshan	Hindi	
1983	Bhakta Prahlada	Kannada	
2025	Mahavatar Narsimha	Hindi	

== See also ==
- Kapila
- Narada
- Bhakti Yoga
- Jaya-Vijaya
- Narasimha
- Hiranykashipu

Preceded by Hiranyakashipu	Daityas unknown	Succeeded by Virochana
