= Nandi (Hinduism) =

Divine animal in Hinduism

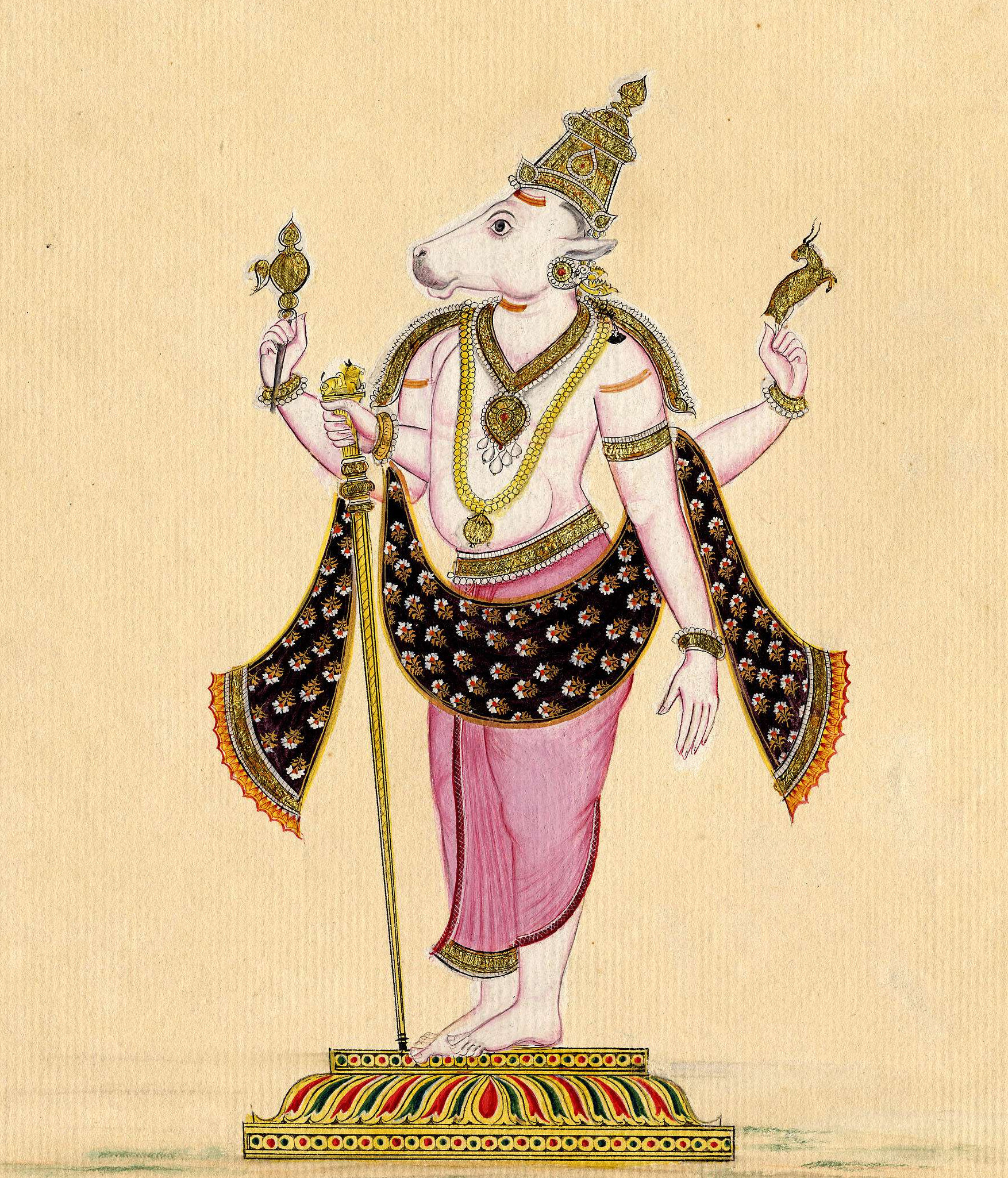
- Nandi in a zoo-anthropomorphic form
- Affiliation: Mount of Shiva
- Abode: Mount Kailash

Genealogy
- Parents: Shilada (father)
- Consort: Suyasha

Nandi (Sanskrit: नन्दि), also known as Nandikeshvara or Nandideva, is the bull vahana (mount) of the Hindu god Shiva. He is also the guardian deity of Kailash, the abode of Shiva. Almost all Shiva temples display stone images of a seated Nandi, generally facing the main shrine.

== Etymology ==
The Sanskrit word nandi (Sanskrit: नन्दि) means happy, joy, and satisfaction, which are the properties of Nandi, the divine guardian of Shiva.

The application of the name Nandi to the bull (Sanskrit: Vṛṣabha) is a development of recent syncretism of different regional beliefs within Shaivism. The name Nandi was widely used instead for an anthropomorphic door-keeper of Kailash, rather than his mount in the oldest Shaivite texts in Sanskrit, Tamil, and other Indian languages. Siddhanta texts distinguish between Nandi and Vṛṣabha.

== Legend ==
Nandi is described as the son of the sage Shilada. Shilada underwent severe penance to have a boon– a child with immortality and blessings of Shiva, and received Nandi as his son. Shiva Purana says that Nandi was born from a yajna performed by Shilada at Place of Anthanarkuruchi. Nandi grew up as an ardent devotee of Shiva and he performed severe penance to become his gate-keeper, as well as his mount, on the banks of river Narmada. According to regional legend, this site is identified with the Tripur Tirth Kshetra in present-day Nandikeshwar Temple, in Jabalpur, Madhya Pradesh.

According to Shaiva Siddhanta, Nandi is considered to be chief among the Siddhars, initiated by Parvati and Shiva. He is regarded to have passed on what he had learned to his eight disciples, namely, the Four Kumaras, Tirumular, Vyagrapada (also known as Pullipani), Patanjali, and Sivayoga Muni. They were sent out in eight different directions to spread his wisdom. His teachings are held by the Nandinatha Sampradaya, a line of gurus who claim descent from Nandi.

Many Puranic legends are available about Nandi. One describes his conflict with Ravana, the antagonist of the Ramayana. Nandi cursed Ravana, the rakshasa king of Lanka, that his kingdom would be burnt by a forest-dweller monkey (vanara), since he behaved in a restless manner, just like a monkey, while waiting to meet Shiva. Later, Hanuman burned Lanka when he went in search of Sita, who was imprisoned by Ravana in the grove called the Ashoka Vatika.

The ancient Tamil text Tiruvilaiyadal Puranam mentions another story in which Nandi is incarnated as a whale. According to this legend, Parvati, Shiva's wife, lost her concentration while Shiva was explaining the meaning of the Vedas to her. Parvati, then incarnated as a fisher-woman to atone for her lack of concentration. To unite his master and his beloved-wife, Nandi took the form of a whale and started to trouble the people. Parvati's father declared that the man who would kill the whale would marry his daughter. Later, Shiva took the form of a fisherman and killed the whale, and received Parvati in her previous form. In the Tirumantiram, Tirumular describes a Shaiva guru lineage in which Shiva transmits sacred teachings to 66 sages, and Nandi is included as an important guru within this chain who receives the teachings and passes them on to other rishis. In this account, Nandi functions as a mediator in the transmission of the Agamas.

== Historical development ==
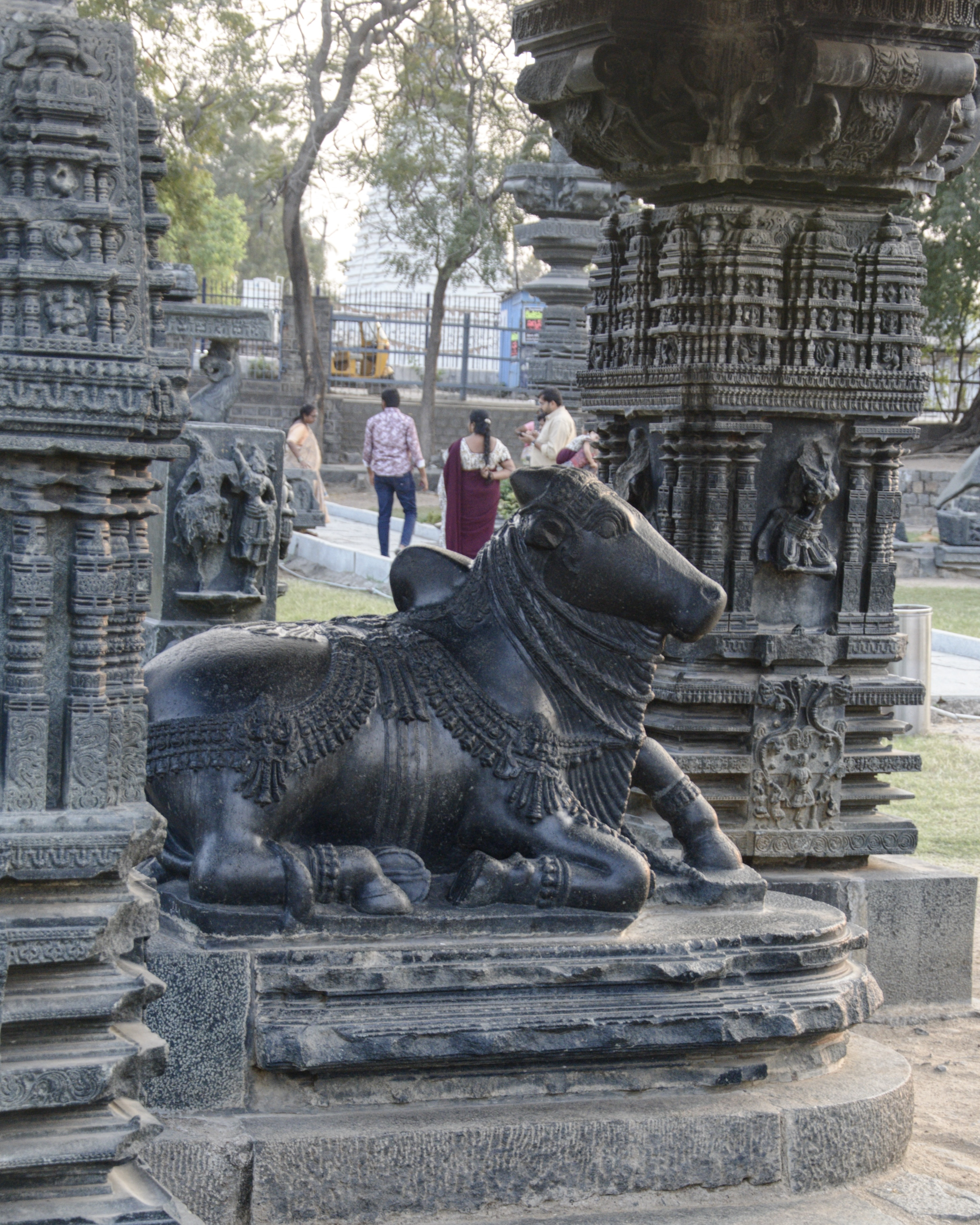
Kakatiya-era (12th century CE) Nandi at Swayambhu Temple, Warangal Fort

The earliest detailed prescriptions concerning Nandi are found in the Shaiva Agamas, a corpus of Sanskrit scriptures composed and compiled between approximately the 5th and 12th centuries CE. These texts treat Nandi not only as Shiva's mount (vahana), but as a permanent ritual and architectural component of Shaiva temples. The Kamikagama (c. 6th-8th century CE), one of the earliest and most influential Shaiva Siddhanta Agamas, prescribes that Nandi be installed directly on the central axis facing the linga. The text specifies the relative positioning of the sanctum (garbhagriha), bali-pitha (offering altar), and Nandi pavilion, establishing the arrangement that became standard in South Indian Shaiva temples. The Karanagama and Suprabhedagama (c. 8th-10th centuries CE) provide detailed iconographic instructions for sculpting Nandi. These texts describe him as a recumbent bull with well-proportioned limbs, prominent hump, dewlap, and tail, adorned with necklaces, bells, garlands, and decorative cloth. The Agamas prescribe measurements for the image and its pedestal.

By the Chola period (9th-13th centuries), large monolithic sculptures of Nandi became prominent features of temple architecture. Epigraphic evidence from South India also indicates that offerings of livestock, land, and lamps were occasionally engraved on Nandi pillars situated before Shaiva temples.

== Iconography ==
The Agamas describe Nandi in a zoo-anthropomorphic form, with the head of bull and four hands, with antelope, axe, mace, and abhayamudra. In his mount form, Nandi is depicted as a seated bull in all Shiva temples, all over the world. This form has been found even in Southeast Asian countries including Cambodia.

A common popular practice in some Shiva temples involves devotees whispering personal wishes or prayers into Nandi's ear, usually the right ear. This act is based on the belief that Nandi, being Shiva's primary guard, carries the message directly to Shiva.

Symbolically, the seated Nandi faces the sanctum in Shiva temples and represents an individual jiva (soul) and the message that the jiva should always be focused on the Parameshvara. From the yogic perspective, Nandi is the mind dedicated to Shiva, the absolute. In other words, to understand and absorb light, the experience, and the wisdom is Nandi, who is the guru within. Some Puranic accounts also describe anthropomorphic depictions of Nandi. In the Linga Purana, Nandi is portrayed with a jatamakuta (matted hair crown), three eyes, and four arms carrying a trident (sula), axe (tanka), mace (gada), and thunderbolt (vajra).

=== Nandi Flag ===
Nandi Flag, the official flag of Hindu Shaivas all over the world.

Nandi flag or Vrshabha flag, a flag with the emblem of seated bull is recognized as the flag of Shaivism, particularly among Tamil community all over the world. Nandi was the emblem of historical Tamil Shaiva monarchs, such as Pallava dynasty and Jaffna Kingdom. Several campaigns to inform the Shaivas about their Nandi flag are carried out continuously during the Shivaratri session, particularly among Tamil community of Sri Lanka, Tamil Nadu, and diaspora.

The Nandi flag used nowadays was designed by Ravindra Sastri of Madurai, Tamil Nadu, according to the request and guidance of S. Danapala, a Sri Lankan Shaiva personage, in the 1990s. The first Nandi flag was hoisted in 1998, at Colombo Hindu College at Ratmalana, Sri Lanka. It was declared as the official Shaiva flag in fourth International Saiva Siddhanta Conference, held in Zurich in 2008. Nowadays, Tamil Shaivas, especially in Sri Lanka, Canada, Australia, UK, South Africa, and Switzerland, hoist the flag in all religious and cultural festivals. Nandi flag was declared as the official Hindu flag of Sri Lanka.

== Gallery ==
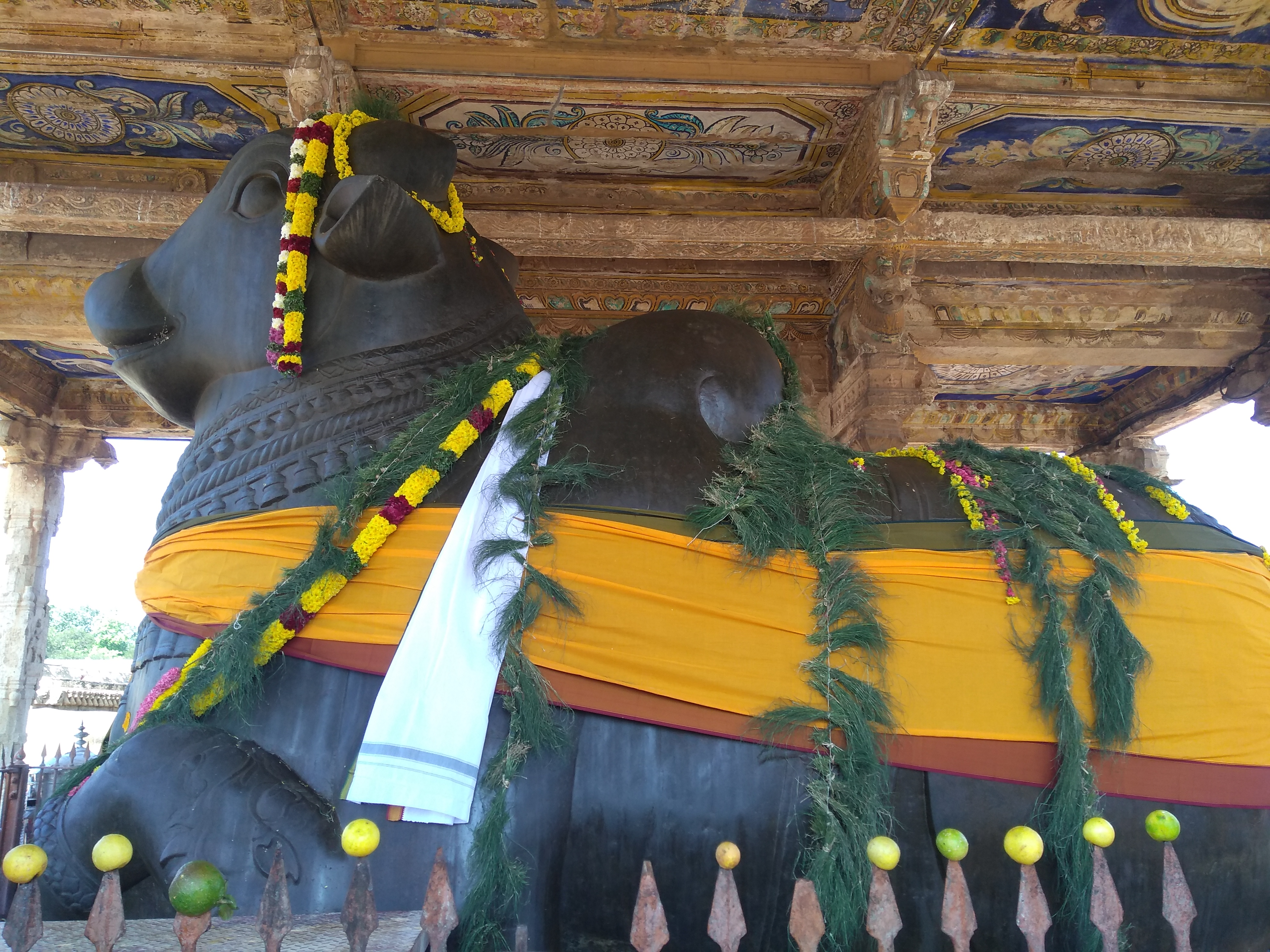
The tallest statue of Nandi at the Brihadisvara Temple in Thanjavur, Tamil Nadu, India

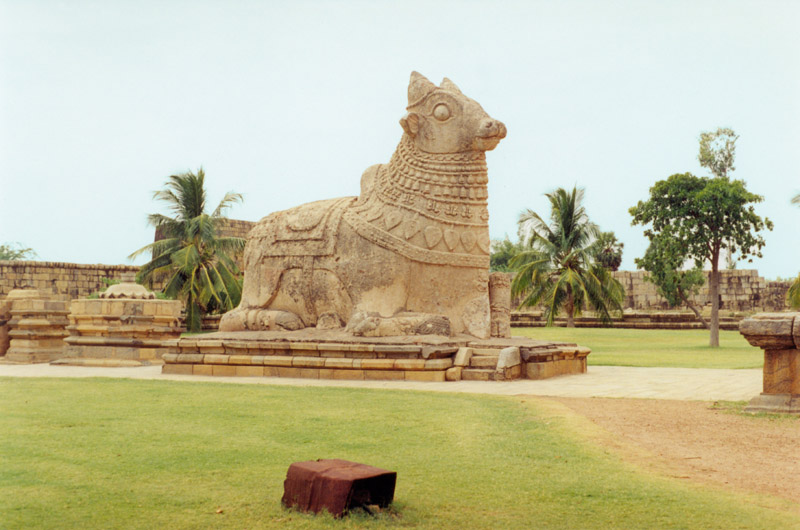
Nandi at the Brihadeeshwara Temple in Gangaikonda Cholapuram, Tamil Nadu, India

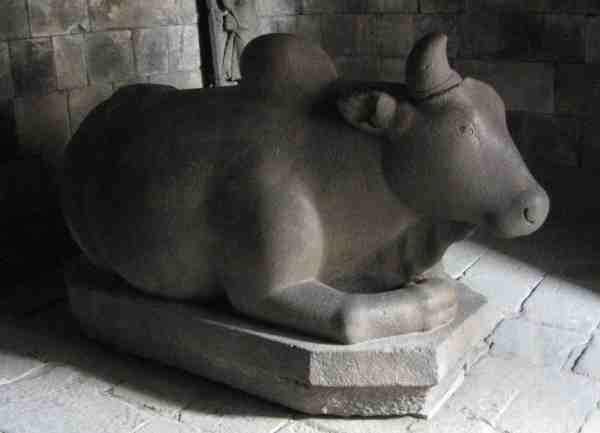
Nandi at Prambanan, Java, Indonesia

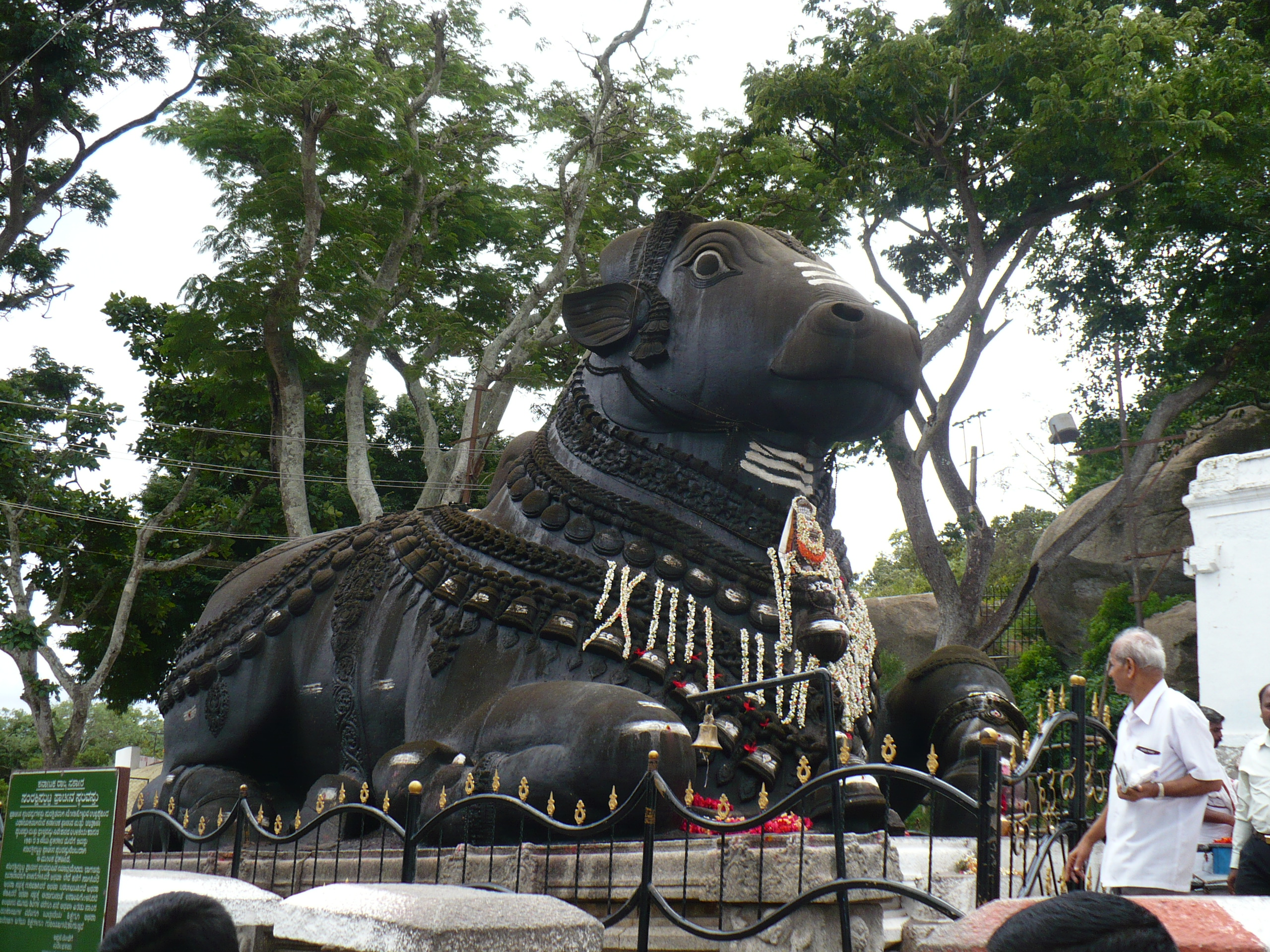
A 2nd-century CE sculpture of Nandi at the Chamundi Hills

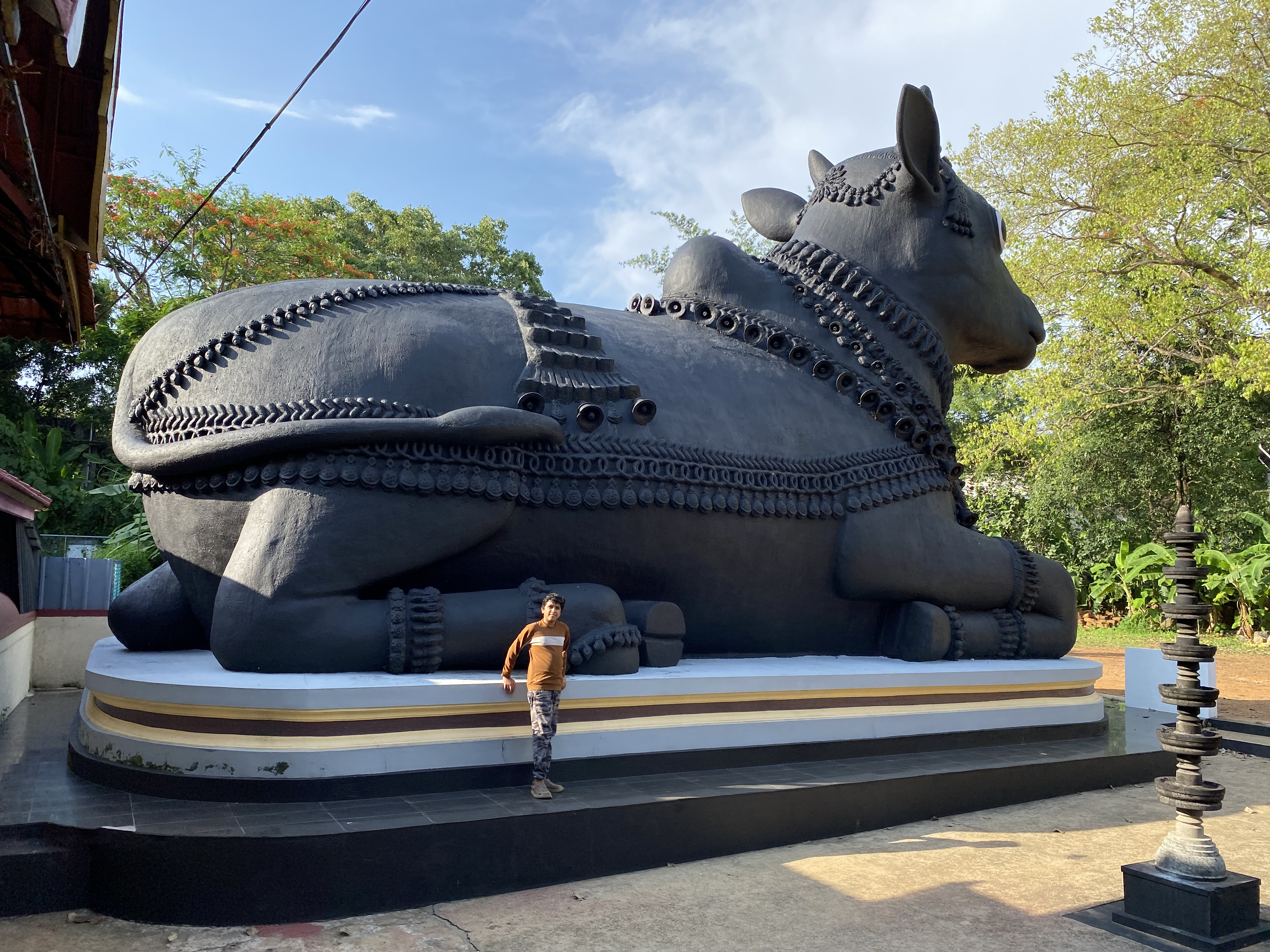
at Aimury Sri Mahadeva Temple, Koovappady

Nandi Pond, a sacred pond dedicated to Nandi

A Nandi temple near a waterbody

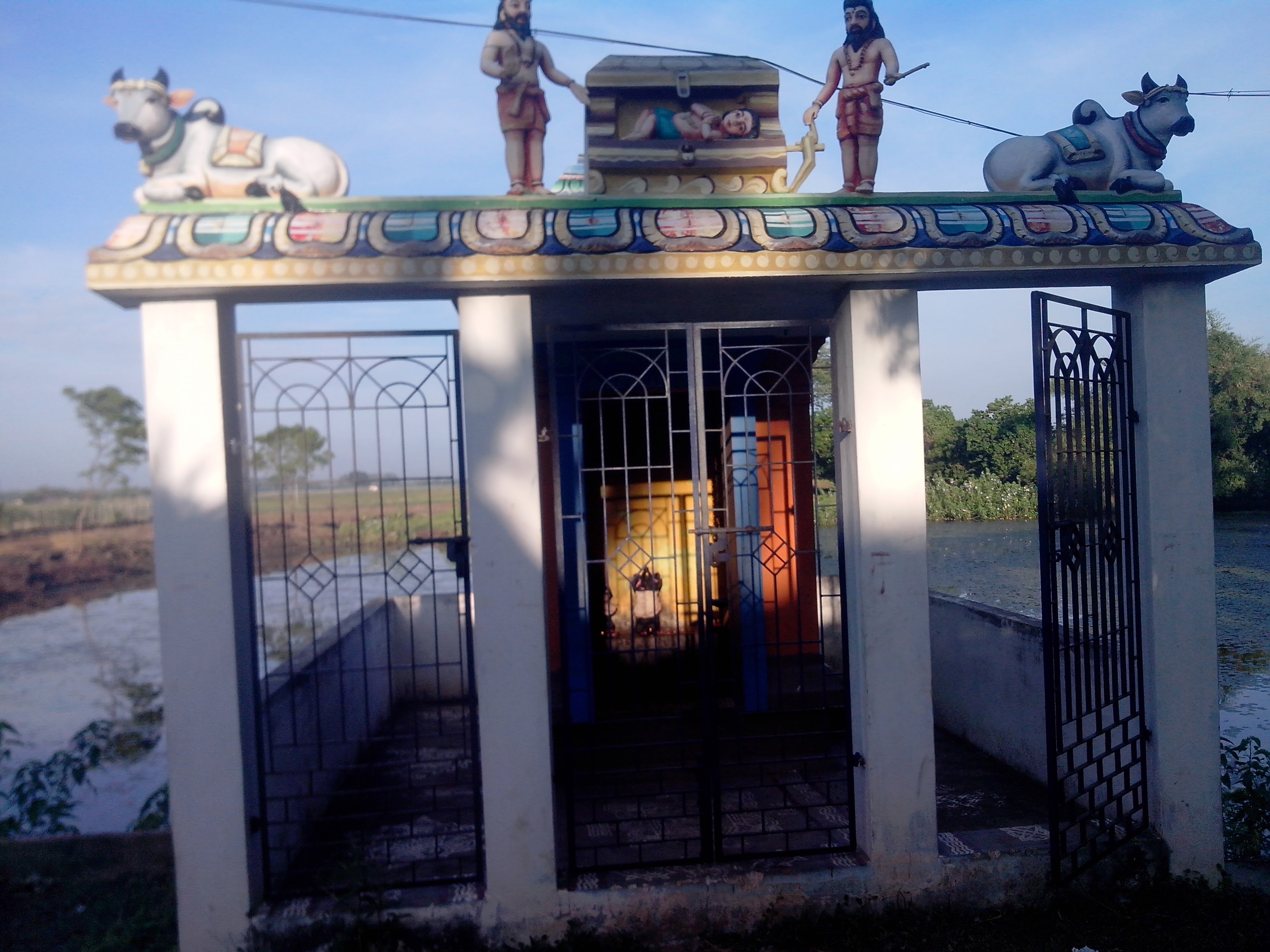
A Nandi temple near a waterbody

== See also ==
- Yaganti temple, the Nandi statue that has been growing in size
- Kamadhenu
- Cattle in religion
- Gavaevodata, the primordial cow in Zoroastrianism
- Kao (bull)
