= Four Kumaras =

Four sages from the Puranic texts of Hinduism

The Four Kumaras
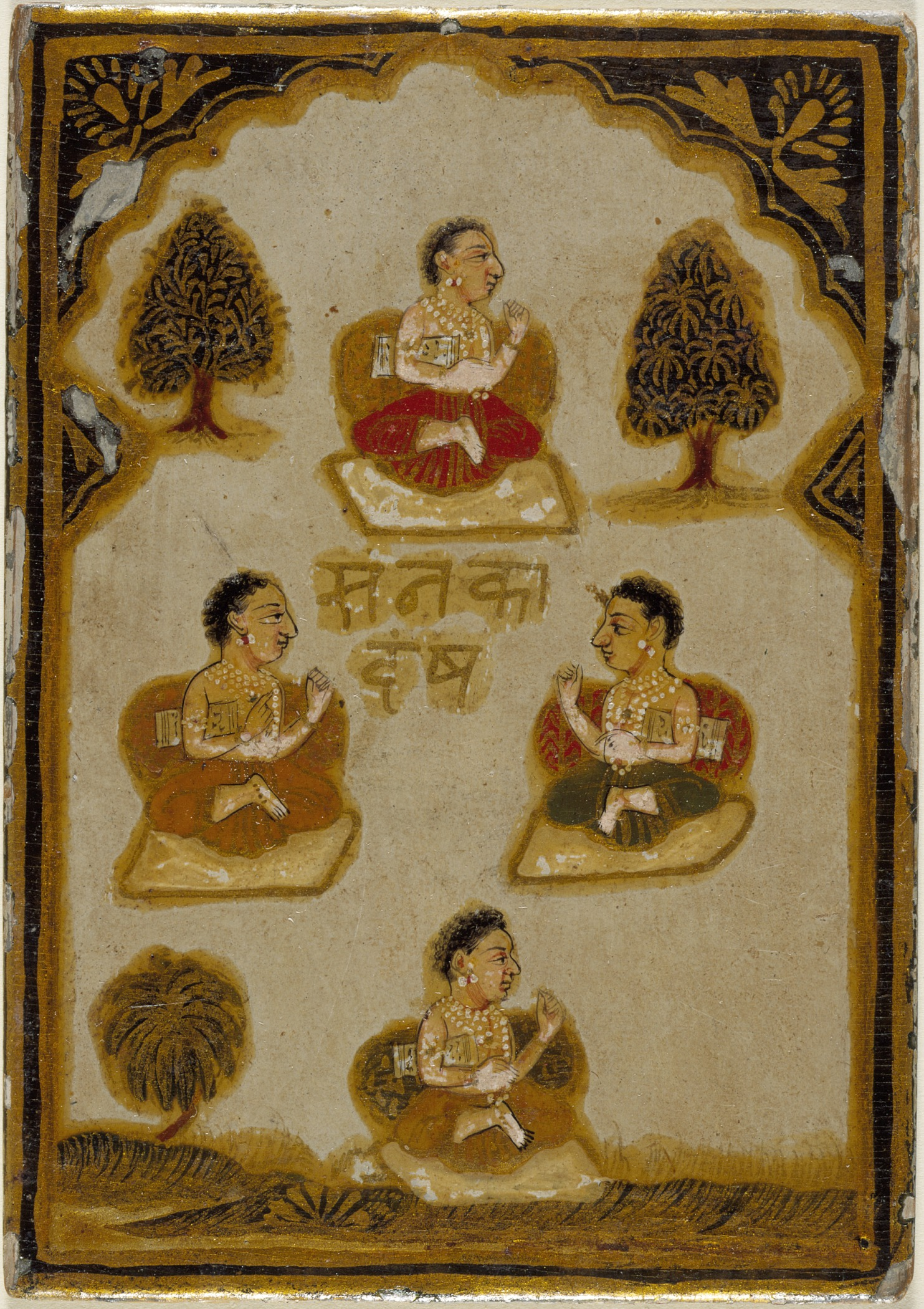
- Four Kumaras from a Dashavatara Ganjifa set, c. 1800
- Other names: Sanakadika Rishis
- Affiliation: Children of Brahma; Devotees of Vishnu
- Abode: Janaloka

Genealogy
- Parents: Brahma
- Siblings: Chitragupta, Narada and Daksha

The Kumaras are four sages (rishis) from the Puranic texts of Hinduism who roam the universe as children, generally named Sanaka, Sanandana, Sanatana, and Sanatkumara. They are described as the first mind-born creations and sons of the creator-god Brahma. Born from Brahma's mind, the four Kumaras undertook lifelong vows of celibacy (brahmacharya) against the wishes of their father. They are said to wander throughout the materialistic and spiritualistic universe without any desire but with the purpose of teaching. All four brothers studied Vedas from their childhood, and always travelled together.

The Bhagavata Purana lists the Kumaras among the twelve mahajanas (great devotees or bhaktas) who although being eternally liberated souls from birth, still became attracted to the devotional service of Vishnu from their already enlightened state. They play a significant role in a number of Hindu spiritual traditions, especially those associated with the worship of Vishnu and his avatar Krishna, sometimes even in traditions related to Shiva.

== Names ==
The group is known by various names: "Kumaras" (young man or youth), "Chatursana" or "Chatuh Sana" (the four with names starting with Sana) and "Sanakadi" (Sanaka and the others). Individual names usually include Sanaka (ancient), Sanatana (eternal), Sanandana (ever-joyful) and Sanatkumara (ever-young). Sometimes, Sanatana is replaced by Sanatsujata. A fifth Kumara named Ribhu is sometimes added. Sometimes, the Kumaras are enumerated as six with Sana and Ribhu or Sanatsujata added.

Though in Mahabharata, a total of seven sons are mentioned, namely: 1) Aniruddha, 2) Sana, 3) Sanatsujata, 4) Sanaka, 5) Sanandana, 6) Sanatkumara and 7) Sanatana and further mentions that, "Knowledge comes to these seven rishis, of itself (without being dependent on study or exertion). These seven are wedded to the religion of Nivritti (inward contemplation).

=== Sanatkumara ===
Sanatkumara in Sanskrit means "eternal youth". He is the author of the Sanatkumara Samhita, which is part of the Shiva Purana, and has 59 chapters. It is also taken as a part of the Pañcaratra, Vaishnavite devotional texts. He taught Bhishma the mental and spiritual sciences.

In the Bhagavata Purana, Sanatkumara is the first to receive divine knowledge from Sankarshana and passes it through a lineage of sages including Samkhyayana, Pulastya, and Maitreya until it reaches Vidura, a chain that establishes the purana as a bridge between ancient revelation (Shruti) and recorded tradition (Smriti).

The Chandogya Upanishad, Chapter seven, is about Sanatkumara's Instructions on Bhuma-Vidya to celestial sage Narada, Sanatkumara finds mention across Mahabharata, as a great sage, who dispels doubts and the preceptor in all matters affecting Yoga.

Also mentioned is the Tirtha of Kanakhala near Gangadwara or Haridwar, where through extensive tapas, he attained great ascetic powers.

== Legend ==
=== Origin ===
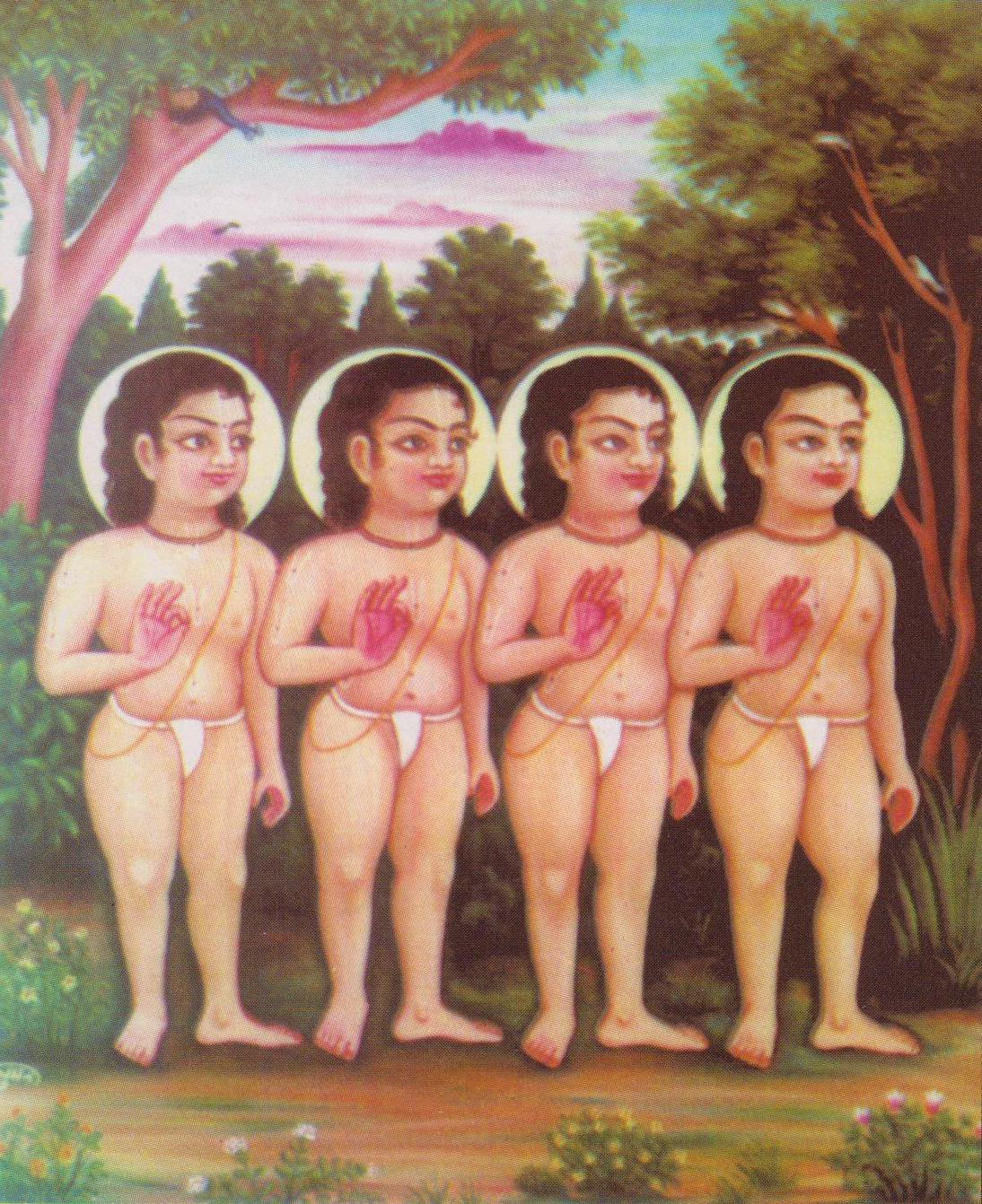
Four Kumaras

The four Kumaras are the eldest sons of the creator-god Brahma. When Brahma undertook the task of creating the universe, he first created some beings from different parts of his body to aid him. The Kumaras were the first such beings. They were created from his mind and appeared as infants. Brahma ordered them to aid in the creation, but as manifestations of sattva (purity), and uninterested in worldly life, they refused and instead devoted themselves to God and celibacy, against the wishes of their father. The Bhagavata Purana narrates further that their refusal made Brahma angry and his wrath manifested the deity Shiva. As per a variant, Brahma practised tapas (austerities) and pleased Vishnu, and so the later he appeared in the form of the four infant Kumaras as Brahma's sons. Some texts like the Devi Bhagavata Purana and the Bhavishya Purana narrates the four Kumaras appeared even before the Brahma of the present age (In a cycle of time, some texts say that a Brahma dies and is reborn.)

The four Kumaras learnt the Vedas at the age of four or five. They thus became great jnanis (learned beings), yogis, and Siddhas (the perfect enlightened ones). The Kumaras remained in the form of children due to their spiritual virtues. The age of the sages varies in sacred texts. While five is the most popular, they are also mentioned as being five-year-old boys. They practised the vow of renunciation (sannyasa) and celibacy (brahmacharya) and remained naked. They wander together throughout the materialistic and spiritualistic universe without any desire but with a purpose to teach. They are sometimes included in the list of Siddhars (Tamil practitioners of Siddha).

The four Kumaras are said to reside in Janaloka or Janarloka (loka or world of the intellectuals in the present parlance) or in Vishnu's abode of Vaikuntha. They constantly recite the mantra Hari Sharanam (Refuge in Vishnu) or sing Vishnu's praises. These hymns and glories of Vishnu serve as their only food. Another son of Brahma, the sage Narada, who is described as their disciple, extolls their virtues in the Padma Purana. Narada says though they appear as five-year-old children, they are the great ancestors of the world.

They are possessed also of deep knowledge of the Samkhya philosophy. They are preceptors of the scriptures on duty and it is they that introduce the duties of the religion of Nivritti (inward contemplation), and cause them to "flow in the worlds".

=== Discourses ===
The discourses of the four Kumaras are found in the Hindu epic Mahabharata as well as the Bhagavata Purana.

The Shanti Parva book of the Mahabharata describes the discourse given by the four Kumaras to the demon king Vritra and his guru – the sage Shukra. The king and his guru worship the Kumaras and then Shukra asks them to describe the greatness of Vishnu. Sanatkumara starts by describing Vishnu as the creator and destroyer of all beings. He equates Vishnu's body parts with parts of the universe and the elements, for example, the earth is Vishnu's feet and water is his tongue. All gods are described as being Vishnu. Then Sanatkumara categorizes all beings into six colours depending upon the proportion of the three gunas: sattva (pure), rajas (dim) and tamas (dark). From the lowest to the foremost beings, the colours are dark (tamas is high, rajas is mid, sattva is low), tawny (tamas is high, sattva is mid, rajas is low), blue (rajas is high, tamas is mid, sattva is low), red (rajas is high, sattva is mid, tamas is low), yellow (sattva is high, tamas is mid, rajas is low) and white (sattva is high, rajas is mid, tamas is low). The Vishnu Purana mentions non-living things, lower animals and birds, humans, Prajapatis, gods and the Kumaras are respective examples of the above colours. Sanatkumara elaborates further how a Jiva (living entity) journeys from dark to white in his various births, ultimately gaining moksha if he does good deeds, devotion and yoga.

The Bhagavata Purana narrates the visit of the four Kumaras to the court of King Prithu, the first sovereign in Hindu mythology and an avatar of Vishnu. The king worships the sages and asked them about the way of emancipation (moksha) that can be followed by all people who are caught in the web of worldly things. Sanatkumara tells the king that Vishnu is the refuge to all and grants liberation of the cycle of births and rebirths. His worship frees one from material desires and lust. One should be freed from material objects, live a simple life of non-violence and devotion of Vishnu and follow the teachings of a good guru and undergo self-realisation. One should realize that all living things are forms of God. Without devotion and knowledge, humans are incomplete. Out of four purusharthas ("goals of life"), only moksha is eternal, while religious duty, wealth and pleasure decay with this life. While all beings are subject to destruction, the soul and God in our bodies are eternal. So it is paramount that one surrenders to God (as Vishnu or Krishna), said Sanatkumara ending his counsel. Prithu worships the Kumaras again, who blessed him.

The first section or Purvabhaga of Naradiya Purana, an upapurana has 4 padas or sections, each told by the four Kumaras respectively to Narada. Brahma, who had received the knowledge of the Puranas from Vishnu, imbibed this to his Four Kumaras, who then taught the Puranas to Narada. Narada transmitted it to Vyasa, who scripted them into the Puranic texts. The Vishnu Purana is recorded in two parts, the Vishnu Purana and Naradiya Purana. The teachings of Sanaka of the Kumara brothers are contained in the Naradiya Purana which is also divided into two parts, the first part containing the teachings of Sanaka and others.

=== Visit to Vaikuntha ===
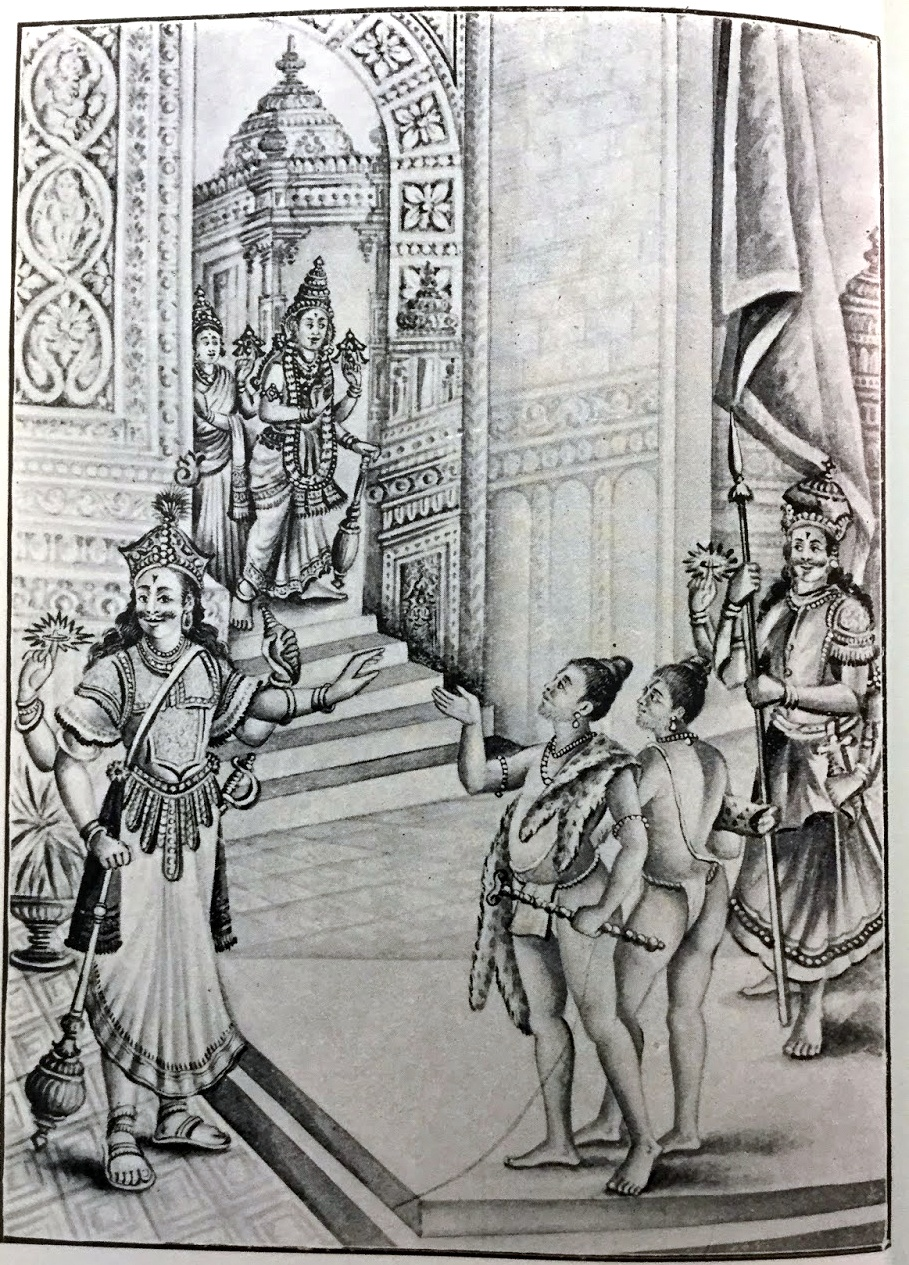
Jaya and Vijaya obstruct the Kumaras from entering Vaikuntha as Vishnu rushes to the spot.

The four Kumaras roamed around at their free will with their cosmic powers all over the universe. During one of their sojourns, they arrived at Vaikuntha, the abode of Vishnu. The city, with the residence of Vishnu located at the center of seven circular walls, is considered as a place of bliss and purity. It has seven gates of entry. The four Kumaras passed through the first six gates without any hindrance. The seventh gate was guarded by Jaya and Vijaya, the two dvarapalas (door-guards) of Vishnu's palace. The angry guardians stopped the four Kumaras and laughed at them since they looked like children and were also naked, and did not permit them to enter through the seventh gate. The four Kumaras were perplexed by the behaviour of the gatekeepers as they had not faced such a situation and ridicule anywhere else. They expected Jaya and Vijaya to be like their master Vishnu, who does not differentiate among beings. Enraged, the Kumaras cursed them to be born on earth thrice, as three villains with characteristics of "lust, anger and greed". The gatekeepers accept the curse and bow to the Kumaras and beg for their forgiveness. Vishnu who learnt of the incident, appeared before the Kumaras in all his glory with his retinue. The four Kumaras, who were on their first visit to Vaikuntha, took in by the sight and the glittering divine figure of Vishnu. With deep devotion, they appealed to him to accept them as his devotees and allow them to offer worship at his feet for all time to come and let his feet be their final emancipation. Vishnu complied with their request and also assured Jaya and Vijaya that they will born as demons on earth but will be released from all births (killed) by an avatar of Vishnu. The two guards were dismissed by Vishnu to go and suffer the curse of the Kumaras on earth and then only return to his abode, after the end of the curse. The two banished guards were then born on earth in the Satya Yuga at an inauspicious hour, to the sage Kashyapa and his wife Diti (daughter of Daksha) as asuras. They were named Hiranyakashipu and Hiranyaksha. Vishnu undertook the Varaha Avatar to kill Hiranyaksha, and the Narasimha avatar to kill Hiranyakasipu.

In the second life, during the Treta Yuga, they were born as Ravana and Kumbhakarna and defeated and killed by Rama avatar as mentioned in the epic Ramayana. Finally, in their third and final life in Dvapara Yuga, they were born as Shishupala and Dantavakra during the time of Krishna avatar and got killed by him, which is also mentioned in epic Mahabharata.

=== In Shaiva tradition ===
Shaivas believe that Shiva assumed the form of Dakshinamurti, the great teacher and meditating facing South observing a vow of silence. The four Kumaras approached Shiva for self-realisation. He taught them about the Supreme Reality, Brahman, by making the chin mudra gesture with his hand. The index finger is touched to the thumb, indicating the union of Brahman and jiva. Thus, Shiva made the Kumaras as his disciples.

The Linga Purana describes that Shiva, or his aspect Vamadeva, will be born as a Kumara and then multiply into the four Kumaras in each kalpa (eon) as sons of Brahma of that kalpa. In the 29th kalpa, Shveta Lohita is the main Kumara; where they are named as Sananda, Nandana, Vishvananda, and Upananadana of white colour; then in the 30th kalpa, they are named as Virajas, Vivahu, Visoka and Vishvabhavana, all of the red colour; and in the 31st kalpa in yellow colour; and in the 32nd kalpa, as of black colour.

== Other legends ==
An incident about the meeting of the four Kumaras with Vishnu's avatar Rama is narrated in the Uttarakanda of the Ramcharitmanas. The Kumaras once stayed in the hermitage of the sage Agastya, who told them about the glory of Rama. So to meet Rama, they went to a forest grove where Rama with his brothers and disciple Hanuman had come. Rama and his brothers were so delighted in meeting the four enlightened sages that they paid obeisance to them. The sages were wonderstruck looking at the divinity of Rama that they prostrated before him and out of great ecstasy started shedding tears of happiness. Rama looking at the sages was deeply impressed and asked them to be seated and praised them for their great achievements and their erudite knowledge of the Vedas and Puranas. The four Kumaras were also delighted to hear the words of praise showered on them by Rama. They in turn extolled his great virtues in a hymn.

== In Kumara Sampradaya ==
Vaishnavism (the devotees that worships Vishnu as the Supreme) is divided into four sampradayas or traditions. Each of them traces its lineage to a heavenly being. The Kumara Sampradaya, also known as the Nimbarka Sampradaya, Catuḥ Sana Sampradaya and Sanakadi Sampradaya, and its philosophy Dvaitadvaita ("duality in unity") is believed to be propagated in humanity by the four Kumaras. The swan avatar of Vishnu Hamsa was the origin of this philosophy and taught it to the four Kumaras, who in turn taught Narada, who finally passed it to the earthy Nimbarka, the main exponent of the sampradaya.

== Sources ==
- Dalal, Roshen (9 October 2023). Hinduism an Alphabetical Guide. Penguin. ISBN 978-0143414216.
- Deshpande, Aruna (2005). India: A Divine Destination. Crest Publishing House. pp. 66–69. ISBN 81-242-0556-6.
