= Shilada =

Hindu sage and father of Nandi

- Penance and Devotion
- Affiliation: Shiva, Shaivism
- Abode: Hermitage (Ashrama)
- Texts: Vayu Purana, Skanda Purana
- Offspring: Nandi

Shilada (Sanskrit: शिलाद, Śilāda) is a Vedic sage in Hindu mythology, primarily recognized as the father of Nandi, the sacred bull and the primary gana (attendant) of Shiva. His narrative is central to the mythology of Nandi's birth and his eventual transformation into a divine deity.

== Legend ==
According to the Vayu Purana and the Skanda Purana (specifically the Kashi Khanda), Shilada was a devout sage who practiced intense penance (tapas) to obtain a boon from Lord Shiva. His primary motivation was to have an immortal son, as he wished to maintain his lineage without the suffering associated with the cycle of life and death.

Shiva, pleased by Shilada’s devotion, appeared before him and granted the boon, promising that he himself would be born as Shilada's son. Following this, while Shilada was preparing the sacrificial ground for a yajna (ritual fire sacrifice), he discovered a male child emerging from the earth. The child possessed the radiance of fire and was adorned with divine ornaments. Shilada adopted the boy and named him Nandi.

== Legacy ==
Shilada is often depicted in Shaivite traditions as a symbol of asceticism and total surrender to the divine. His hermitage is traditionally believed to have been located near the site of his penance, and he is revered by those who seek the grace of Shiva through the path of devotion.

== See also ==
- Nandi (bull)
- Vayu Purana
- Shaivism
