= Jaya-Vijaya =

Gatekeepers of Vaikuntha in Hinduism

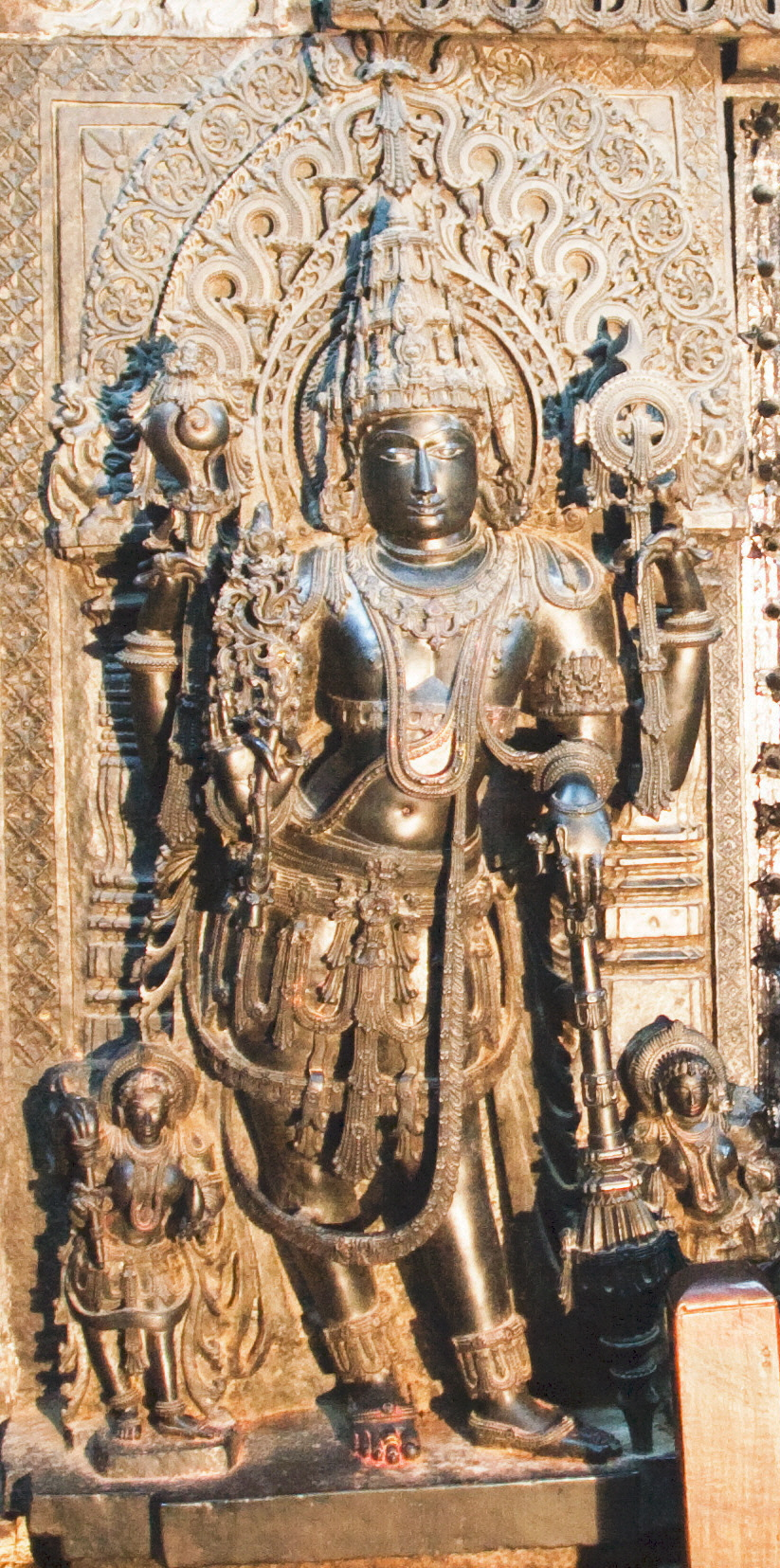
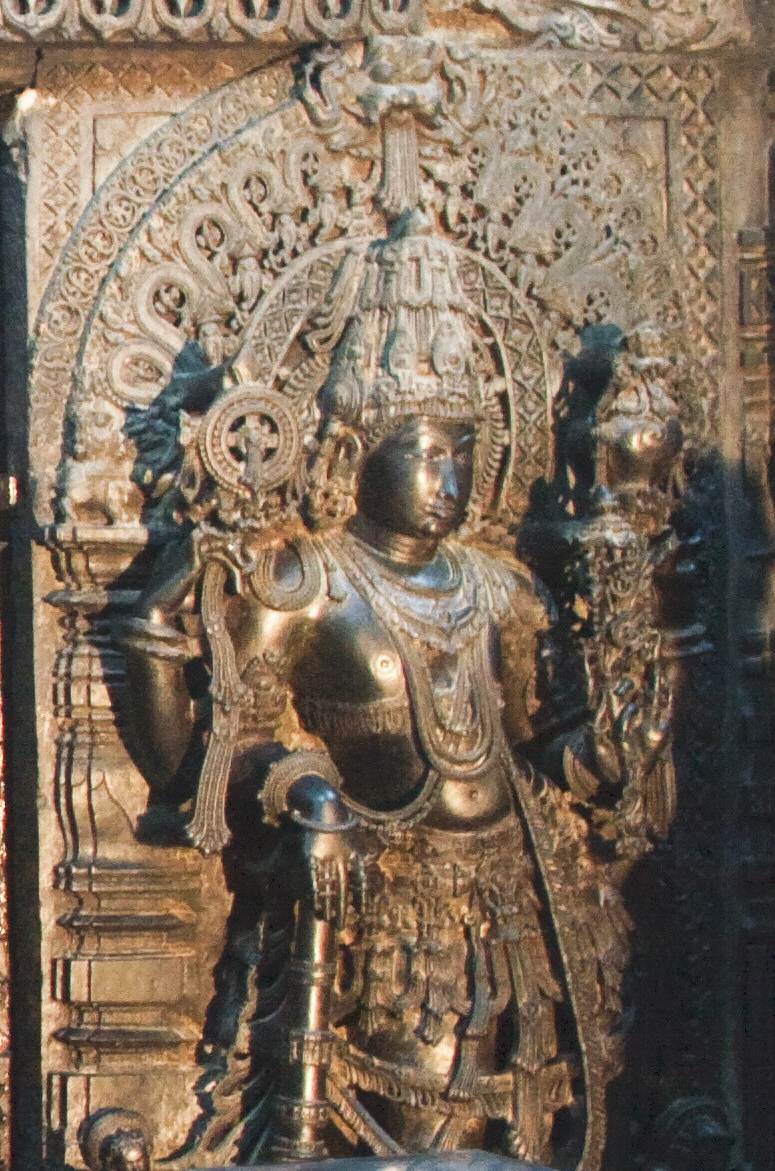
Jaya-Vijaya guarding the sanctum of the Vishnu temple, Chennakesava Temple.

In Hinduism, Jaya and Vijaya are the two dvarapalakas (gatekeepers) of Vaikuntha, the abode of the god Vishnu. Due to a curse by the four Kumaras, they were forced to undergo multiple births as mortals who would be subsequently killed by various avatars of Vishnu. They were incarnated as Hiranyakashipu and Hiranyaksha in the Satya Yuga, Ravana and Kumbhakarna in the Treta Yuga, and finally Shishupala and Dantavakra in the Dvapara Yuga.

== Origin ==
According to the Brahmanda Purana, Jaya and Vijaya were the sons of Kali (not to be confused with the asura) and Kali, in turn, was one of the sons of Varuna and his wife, Stuta (Sanskrit स्तुत, meaning 'praise'). The brother of Kali (and uncle of Jaya and Vijaya) was Vaidya.

According to the Padma Purana, Jaya and Vijaya are stated to be the sons of Kardama and Devahuti. Due to their devotion towards Vishnu, they later became the doorkeepers of Vaikuntha.

== Iconography ==
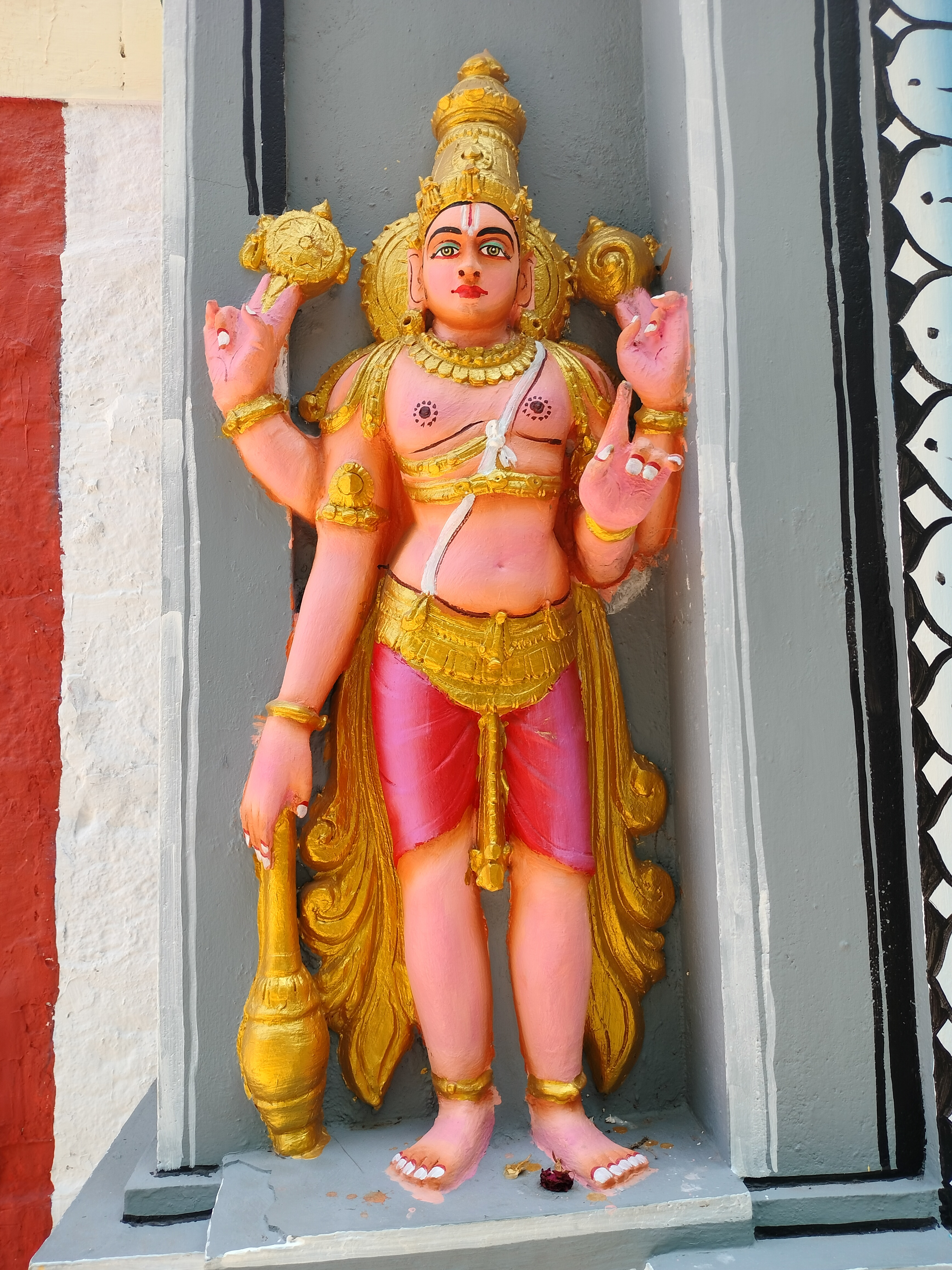
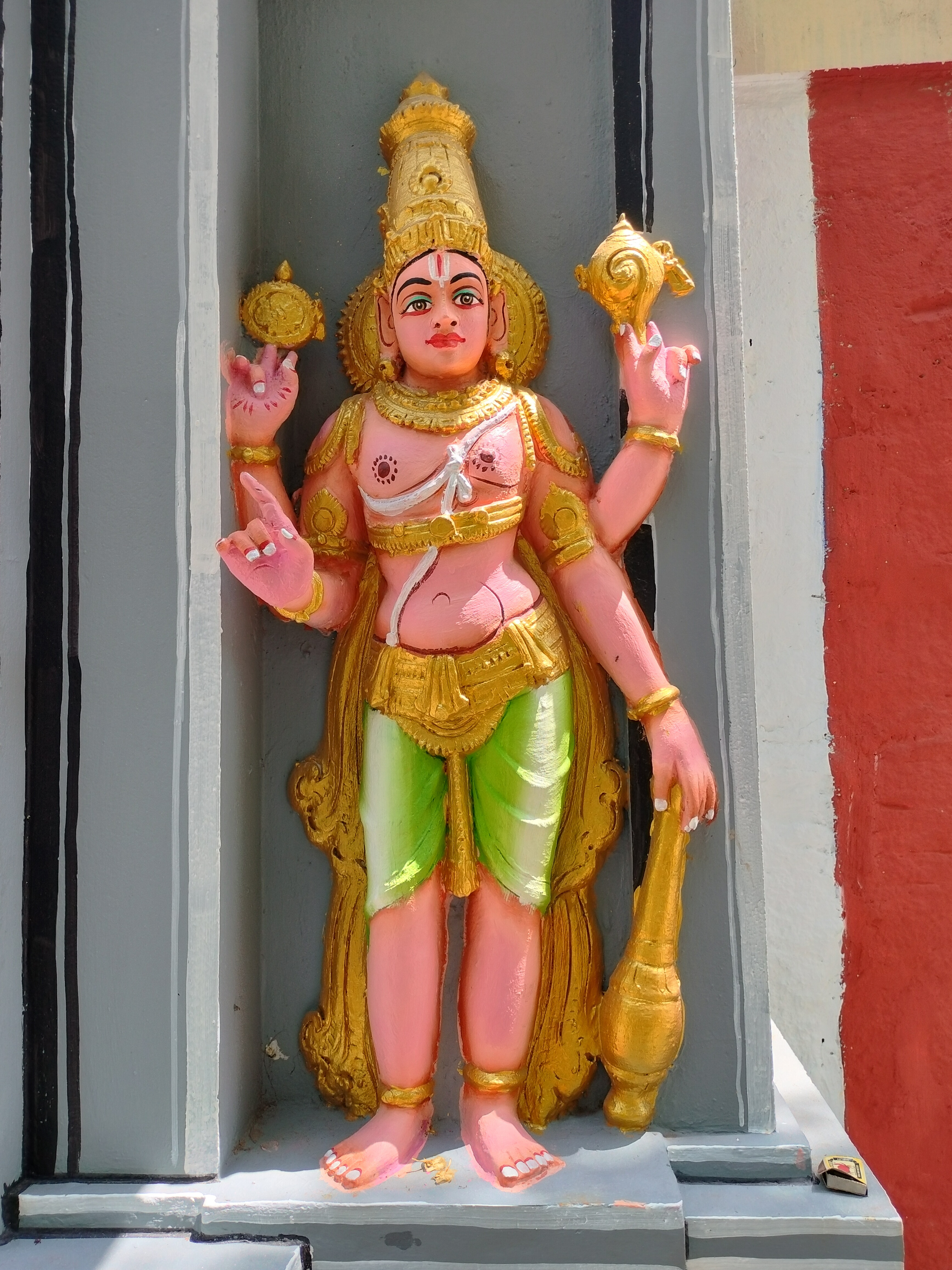
Statues of Jaya (left) and Vijaya (right) outside the sanctum sanctorum of the Koodal Azhagar Temple, Madurai

Jaya is depicted as a four-armed god with the chakra in his upper left hand, a shankha in his upper right hand, a mace in his lower left hand, and a sword in his lower right hand. Vijaya is depicted in the same manner except that he holds a chakra in his upper right hand, a shankha in his upper left hand, a gada in his lower right hand, and a sword in his lower left hand. They hold three weapons that Vishnu holds: the chakra, the shankha, and the mace, but have a sword in their fourth hands, whereas Vishnu holds a lotus.

== Curse of the four Kumaras ==
According to a story from Bhagavata Purana, the Four Kumaras, Sanaka, Sanandana, Sanatana, and Sanatkumara, who are the manasaputras (mind-born children) of Brahma, visit Vaikuntha, the abode of Vishnu, to see him.

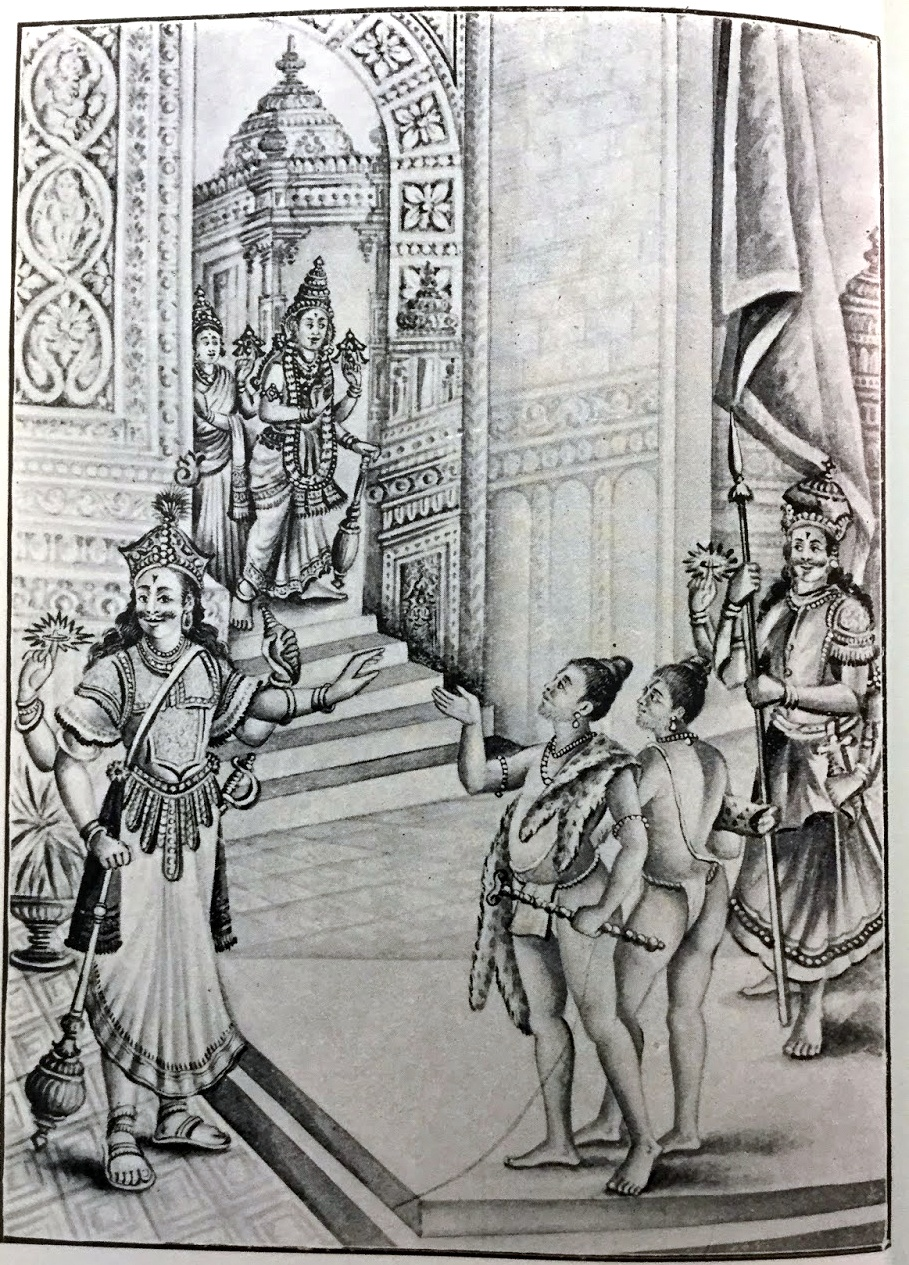
Jaya and Vijaya prevent the Kumaras from entering Vaikuntha.

Due to the strength of their tapas, the four Kumaras appear to be mere children, though they are of advanced age. Jaya and Vijaya interrupt the Kumaras at the gate, thinking them to be children. They also tell the Kumaras that Vishnu is resting and that they cannot see him now. The Kumaras deduce that these beings must possess some kind of fault and sentence them to be born on earth, where they would have to overcome the flaws of lust, anger, and greed, and then be purified. When Vishnu appears before them, and the gatekeepers request Vishnu to lift the curse of the Kumaras, Vishnu says that the curse of the Kumaras cannot be reversed. Instead, he gives Jaya and Vijaya two options. The first option is to take seven births on earth as devotees of Vishnu, while the second is to take three births as his staunch enemies. After serving either of these sentences, they can reattain their stature at Vaikuntha and be with him permanently. Jaya and Vijaya cannot bear the thought of staying away from Vishnu for seven lives. As his enemies, the deity would have to incarnate on earth 3 times to vanquish them. Thus, they would meet him in each of their births. As a result, they choose to be born three times on earth, even though it would have to be as enemies of Vishnu.

In their first life during Satya Yuga, they were born as Hiranyakashipu (Jaya) and Hiranyaksha (Vijaya) to Diti (daughter of Daksha Prajapati) and sage Kashyapa. Hiranyaksha was killed by Varaha (boar avatar) and Hiranyakashipu was killed by Narasimha (man-lion avatar). In their second life during the Treta Yuga, they were born as Ravana (Jaya) and Kumbhakarna (Vijaya), and both were killed by Rama. In their third life during Dvapara Yuga, they were born as Shishupala (Jaya) and Dantavakra (Vijaya) and both were killed by Krishna. In their first two births, they were brothers, and in their final birth, they were cousins.

It has been noted by many that the strengths of Jaya and Vijaya gradually declined with each subsequent birth due to the yuga effect. In their first birth, they are born as asuras who captured and ruled the earth individually. In their second birth, they are born as rakshasas ruling merely a region on earth. In the third birth, they are born as humans in Krishna's extended family itself. Moreover, Vishnu incarnated as two avatars to kill Hiranyaksha (Varaha) and Hiranyakashipu (Narasimha) in the Satya Yuga. Born as Rama in the Treta Yuga, he was able to vanquish both Ravana and Kumbhakarna. In the Krishna avatar during the Dvapara Yuga, the killing of Dantavakra and Shishupala are not even the purpose of the avatar, but rather they are slain to reduce the "bhubhara" (the burden on Bhumi due to too many sinners and non-truthful people).

== Doorkeepers of Vishnu temples ==
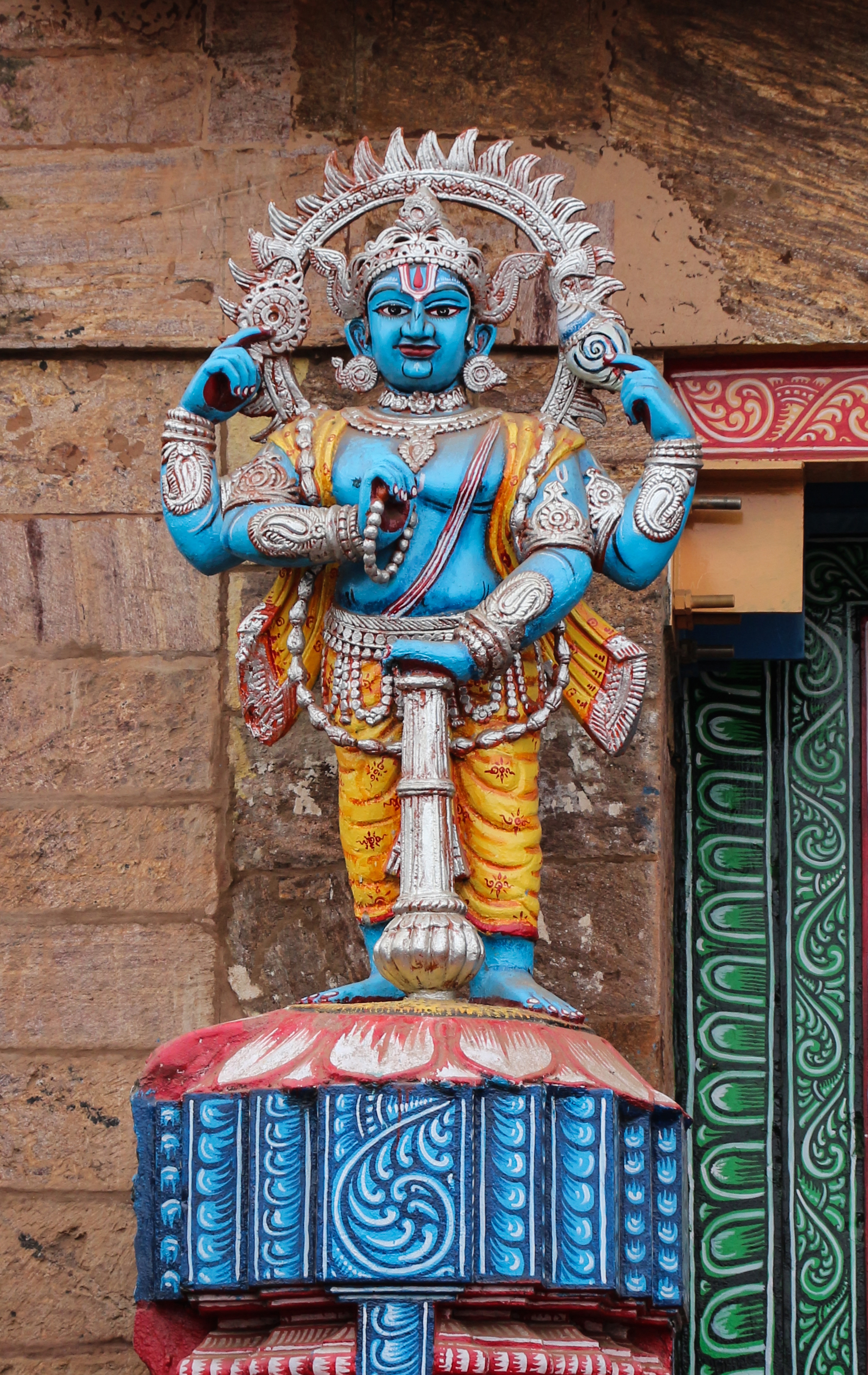
Statue of Vijaya at the entrance of the Jagannath Temple, Puri

In the modern era, known in Sanskrit and held in Hindu tradition as the Kali Yuga, Jaya and Vijaya are free from their curse, and they can be seen as gatekeepers in Vishnu temples affiliated with Vaishnavism. Statues of Jaya-Vijaya stand prominently in the temple of Venkateshvara in Tirumala, the temple of Jagannath in Puri, and the temple of Ranganatha in Srirangam.
