= Kamika Agama =

The Kamika Agama is a Shaiva Agama text. It is the first and most prestigious of the 28 principal Śaiva Tantras, and it is authoritative in ritual performances in the Shiva temples of Tamil Nadu. It played a role in the administration of the Chola Empire.

According to Richard Davis, the text is important in the Saiva Siddhanta tradition, and it addresses not only temple ritual but also personal worship. It also includes prescriptions for iconography of Shiva and descriptions of iconographic symbols, including the trishula.

The Kamika Agama has been existed since the 5th century, and the current published versions were compiled in the 19th century.

The Kamika Agama has two main parts, the Purvabhāga (75 chapters) and the Uttarabhāga (98 chapters), comprising 12,000 verses written in the anuṣṭubh meter.
