= Dantavakra =

King in Hinduism

- Texts: Mahabharata, Puranas
- Region: Karusha

Dantavakra (Sanskrit: दन्तवक्र, lit. 'crooked-teeth') is the king of Karusha in Hinduism. Dantavakra is the third and last birth of Vishnu's gatekeeper, Vijaya, while his brother Jaya is Shishupala.

== Legend ==
=== Puranas ===
According to the Padma Purana (VI.274.16-7), he is of Chaidya lineage.

According to the Vishnu Purana (IV.XIV.40), and some editions of Bhagavata Purana (X.78.5-6) he is a son of Vriddhasharman and Shrutadeva (or Shrutadevi), who is Kunti's and Vasudeva's sister. He is named "Dantavakra" as his teeth were crooked after his birth. Viduratha is his brother. He is an ally of Jarasandha, Kamsa, Shishupala, and Paundraka, and an enemy of Vasudeva Krishna.

The Harivamsha Purana depicts Dantavakra in a more sympathetic light. After learning of Krishna's intention of eloping with Princess Rukmini during her svayamvara, he confers with his allies in the city of Kundina, and expresses the desire to contract a friendship with the deity, realising that he is God himself.

=== Mahabharata ===
In the epic Mahabharata 2:30, he is mentioned as the king of the Adhirajas. After the Pandava general Sahadeva defeats him, making him pay tribute, he is reinstalled on his throne. He attacks Krishna, who is on his way to Dvaraka, after the Rajasuya sacrifice (which Dantavakra had not attended, to protest the killing of Jarasandha) to avenge Shishupala, and his friend Shalva. After announcing his intentions, he strikes his cousin on the head with his mace. Unfazed, Krishna strikes his chest with the Kaumodaki, causing him to spit out blood and perish in the mace-duel. His brother, Viduratha also dies in the same battle.
