= Dvarapala =

Door guardian statue

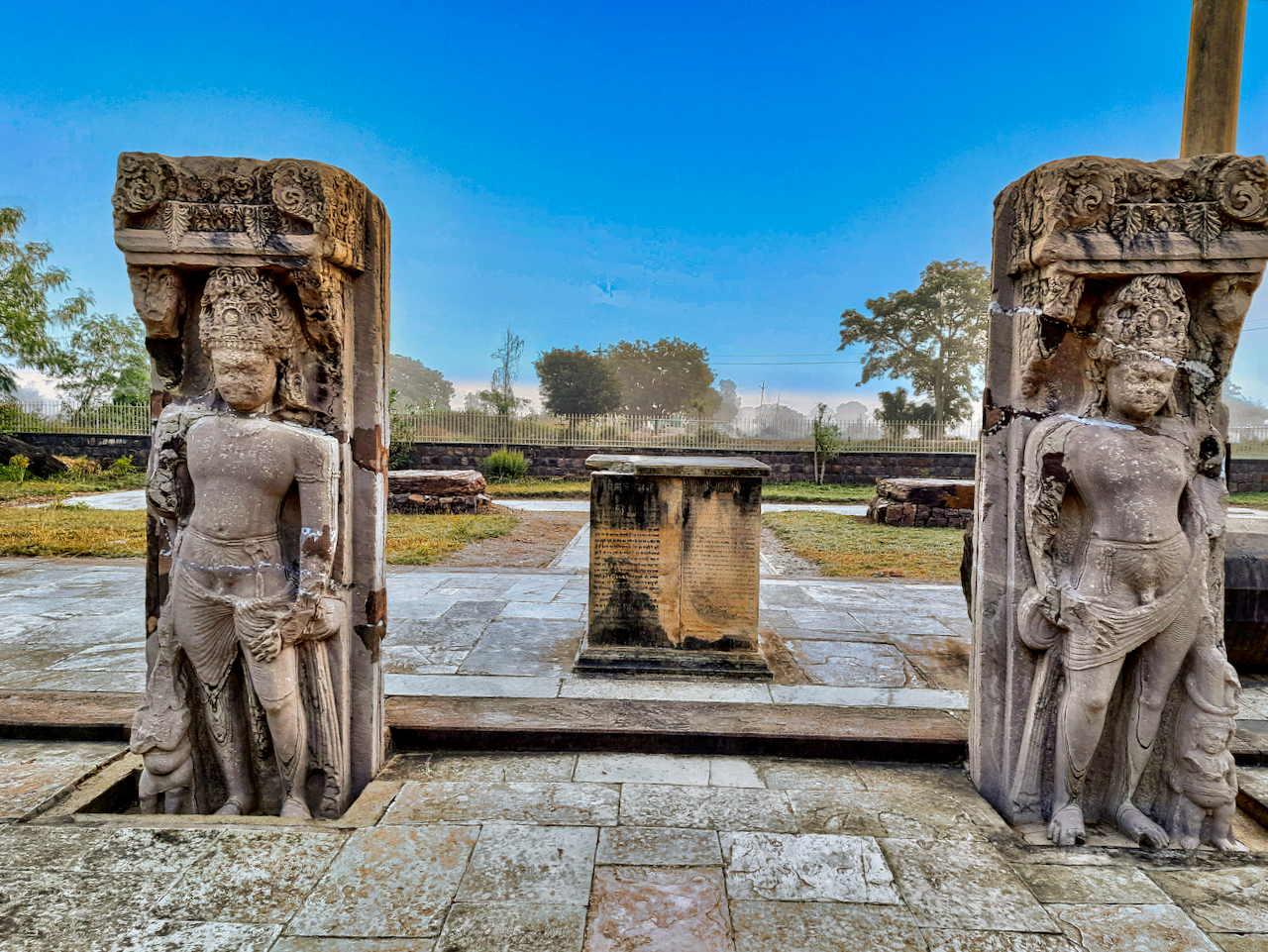
Sondani, two Dvarapalas, circa 525 CE.

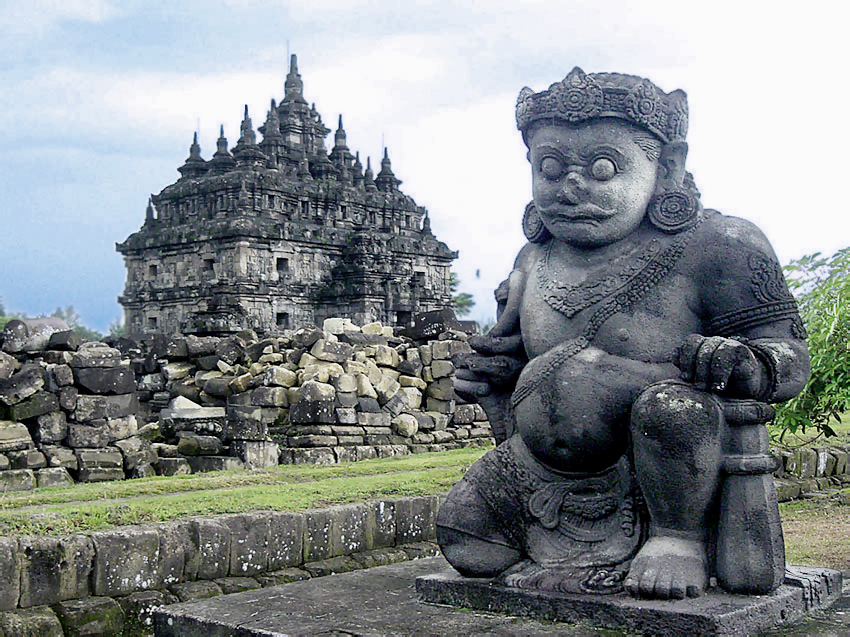
One of two pairs of dvarapala, 9th century Buddhist temple of Plaosan, Java, Indonesia.

A Dvarapala or Dvarapalaka (Sanskrit, "door guard"; IAST: Dvārapāla Sanskrit pronunciation: [dʋaːɽɐpaːlɐ]) is a door or gate guardian often portrayed as a warrior or fearsome giant, usually armed with a weapon - the most common being the gada (mace). The dvarapala statue is a widespread architectural element throughout Hindu, Buddhist, and Jain cultures, as well as in areas influenced by them like Java.

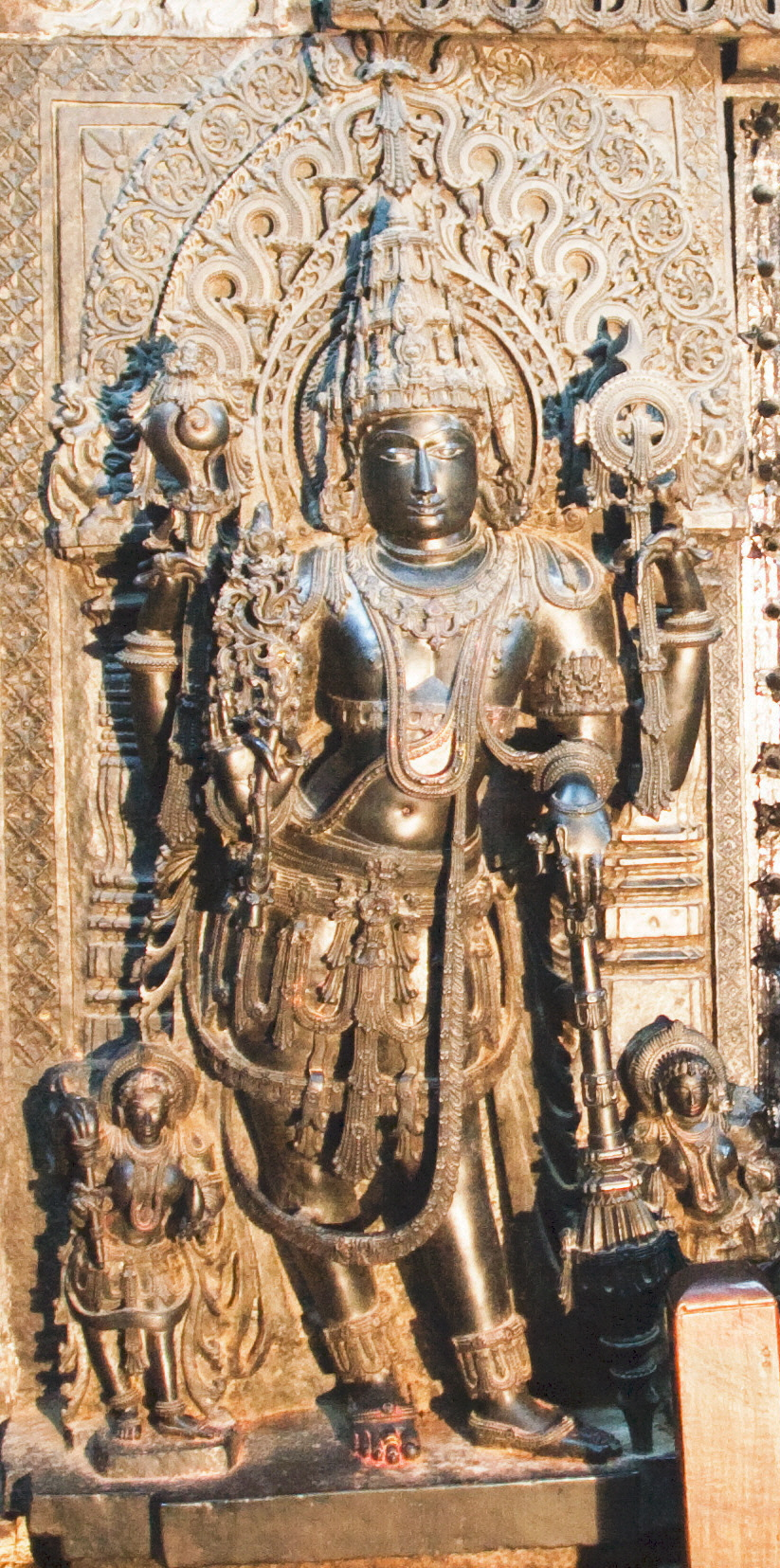
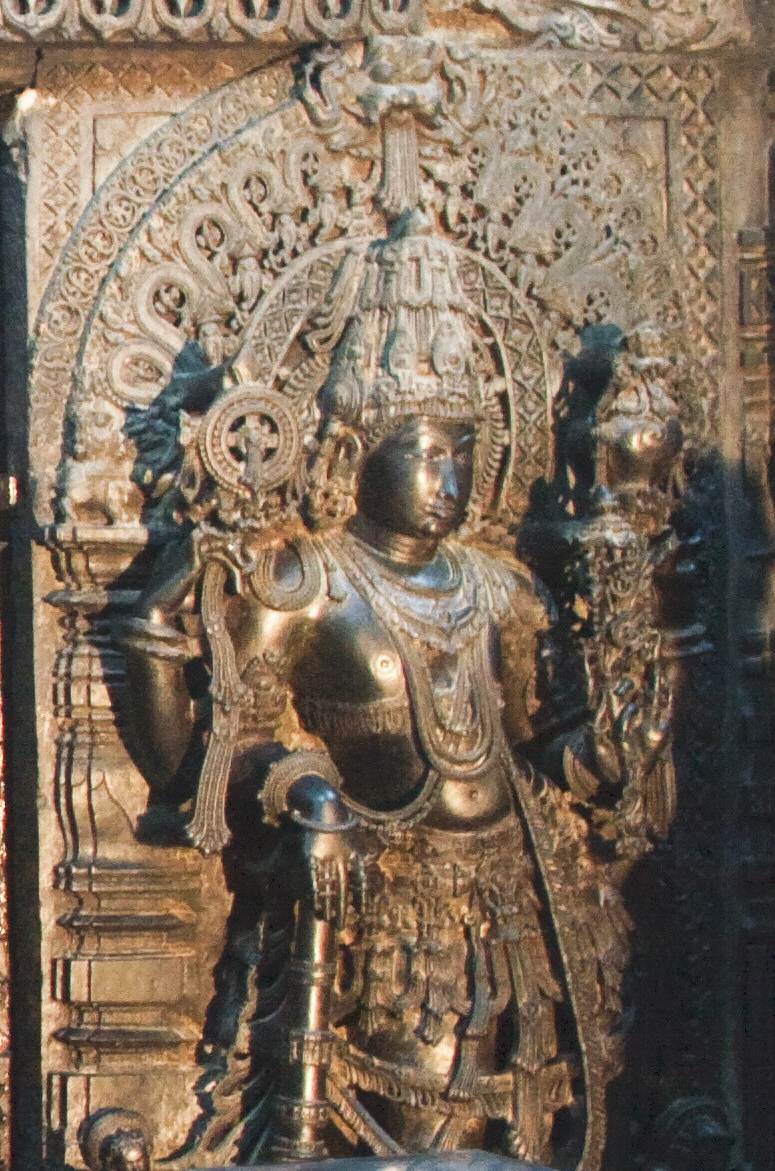
Jaya-Vijaya - the dvarapalas of Vishnu's abode of Vaikuntha are often depicted in his temples, guarding the doors. Here they are depicted guarding the sanctum of a famous Vishnu temple known as Chennakesava Temple.

== Origin and forms ==
Dvarapalas as an architectural feature have their origin in tutelary deities, like Yaksha, and warrior figures, such as Acala, of the local popular religion.

These statues were traditionally placed outside Hindu temples or Buddhist temples, as well as other structures like royal palaces, to protect the holy places inside. A dvarapala is usually portrayed as an armed fearsome guardian looking like a demon, but at the gates of Buddhist temples in Sri Lanka, dvarapalas often display average human features. In other instances, a fierce-looking nāga snake figure may perform the same function. Dvarapalas are present in almost all Hindu temples, Dvarapalas are highly important in Vaishnavism and are called Jaya-Vijaya they are the guardians or (gatekeepers) of the abode of Vishnu, known as Vaikuntha (meaning place of eternal bliss). They are present in almost all Vaishnavite temples and they are mentioned in several Hindu scriptures like Brahmanda Purana and Srimad Bagavatham. According to the Brahmanda Purana, Jaya and Vijaya were the sons of Kali, an Asura, and Kali, in turn, was one of the sons of Varuna and his wife, Stuta (Sanskrit (स्तुत, meaning 'praise').

The ancient sculpture of dvarapala in Thailand is made of high-fired stoneware clay covered with a pale, almost milky celadon glaze. Ceramic sculptures of this type were produced in Thailand, during the Sukhothai and Ayutthaya periods, between the 14th and 16th centuries, at several kiln complexes located in northern Thailand.

Depending on the size and wealth of the temple, the guardians could be placed singly, in pairs, or in larger groups. Smaller structures may have had only one dvarapala. Often there was a pair placed on either side of the threshold to the shrine. Some larger sites may have had four (lokapālas, guardians of the four cardinal directions), eight, or 12. In some cases only the fierce face or head of the guardian is represented, a figure very common in the kratons in Java.

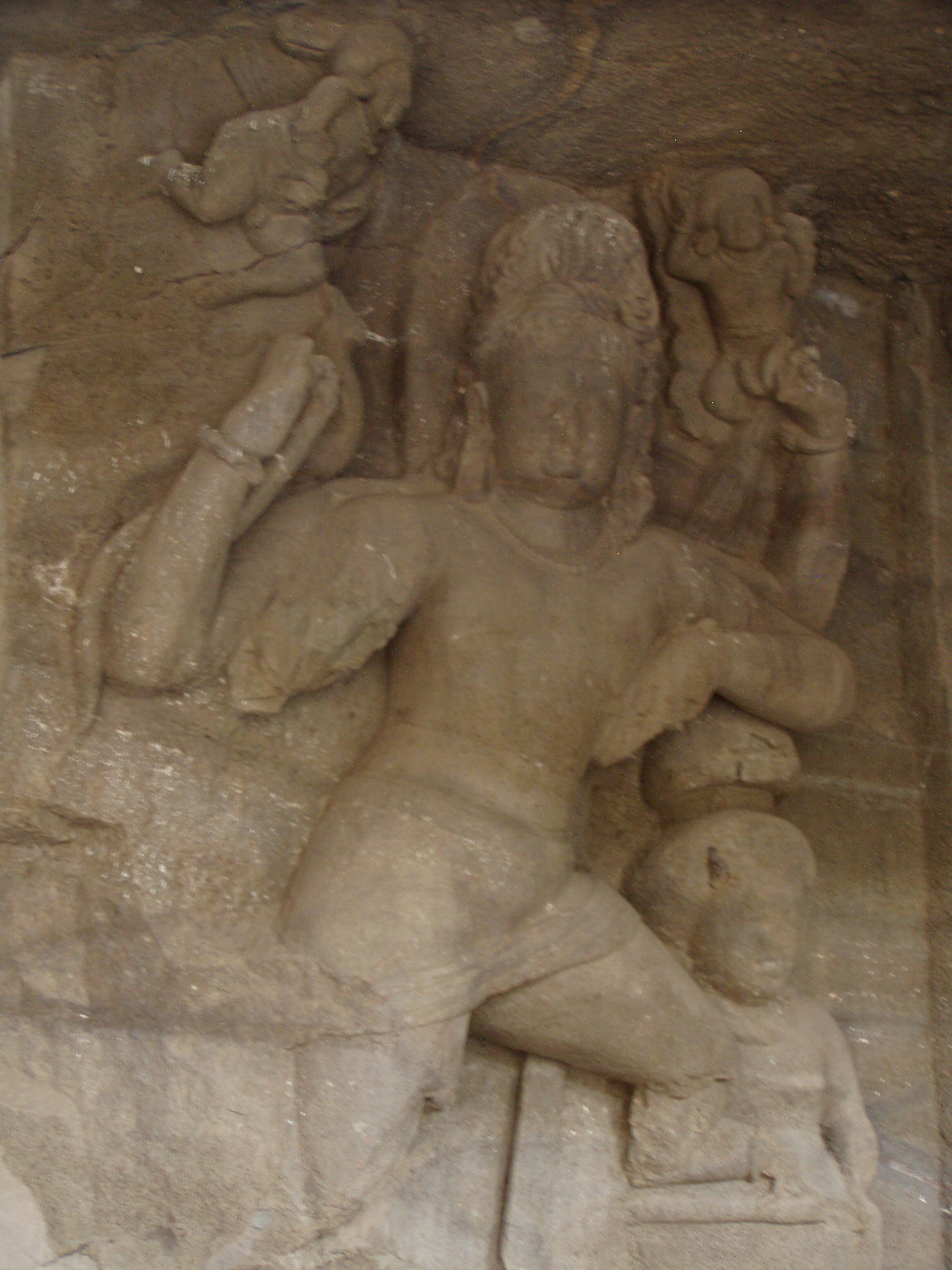
Dvarapala in Elephanta India.

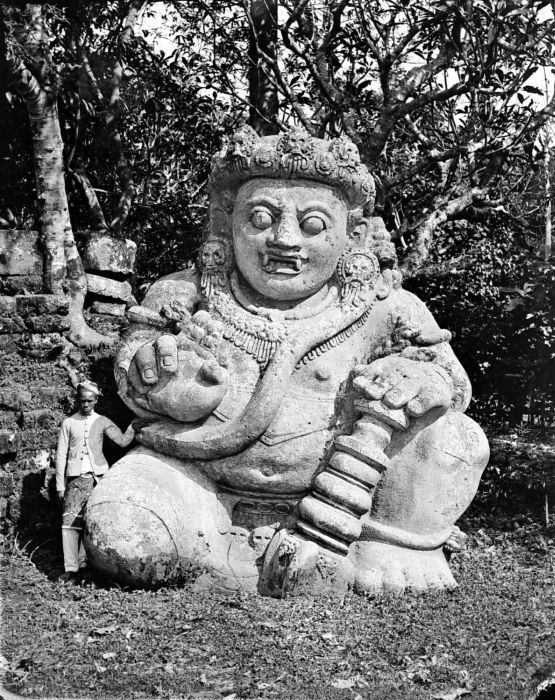
The largest dvarapala stone statue of Java, Singhasari period.

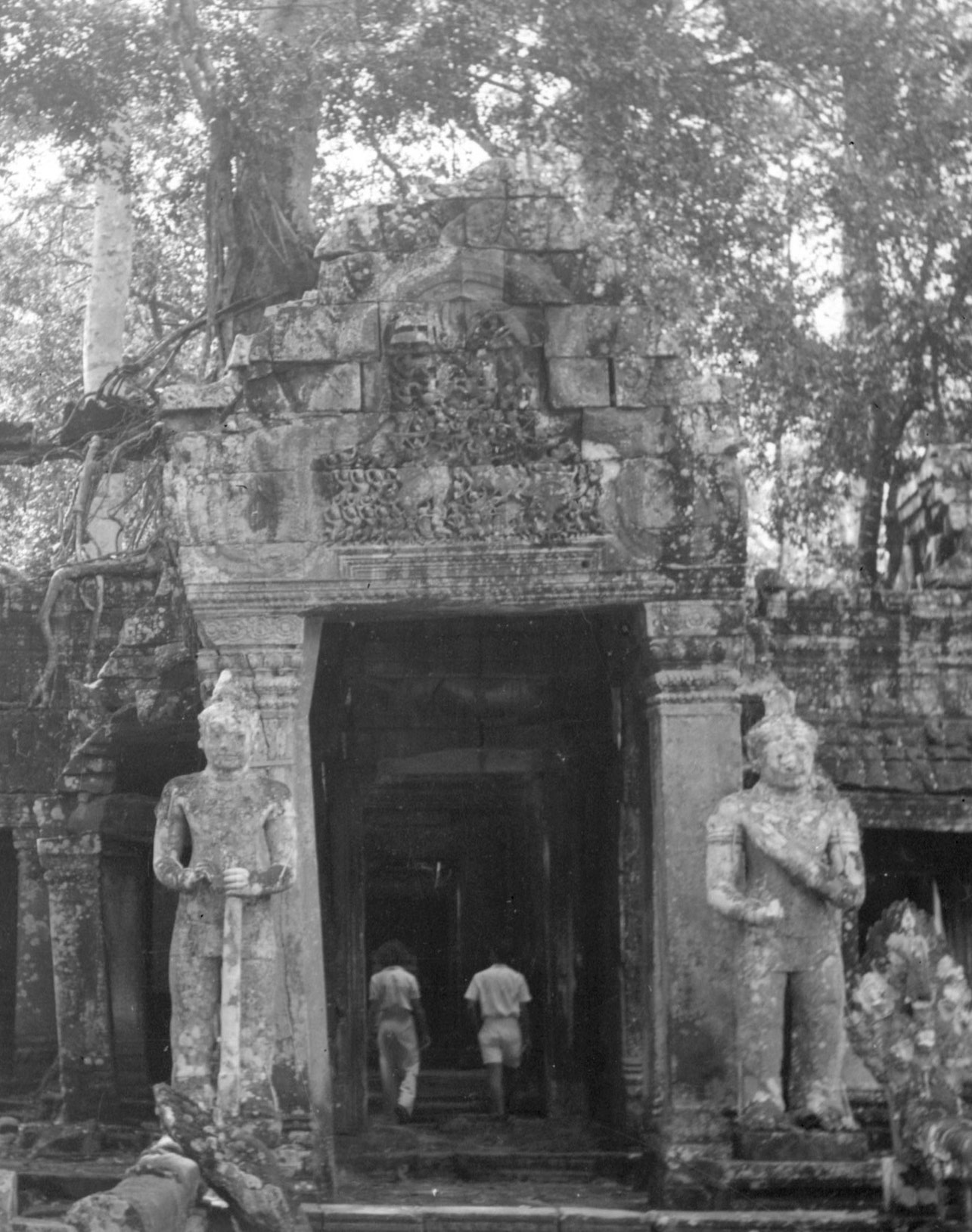
Two Gigantic Guardian Dvarapalas at 12th Century Preah Khan in Angkor, Cambodia

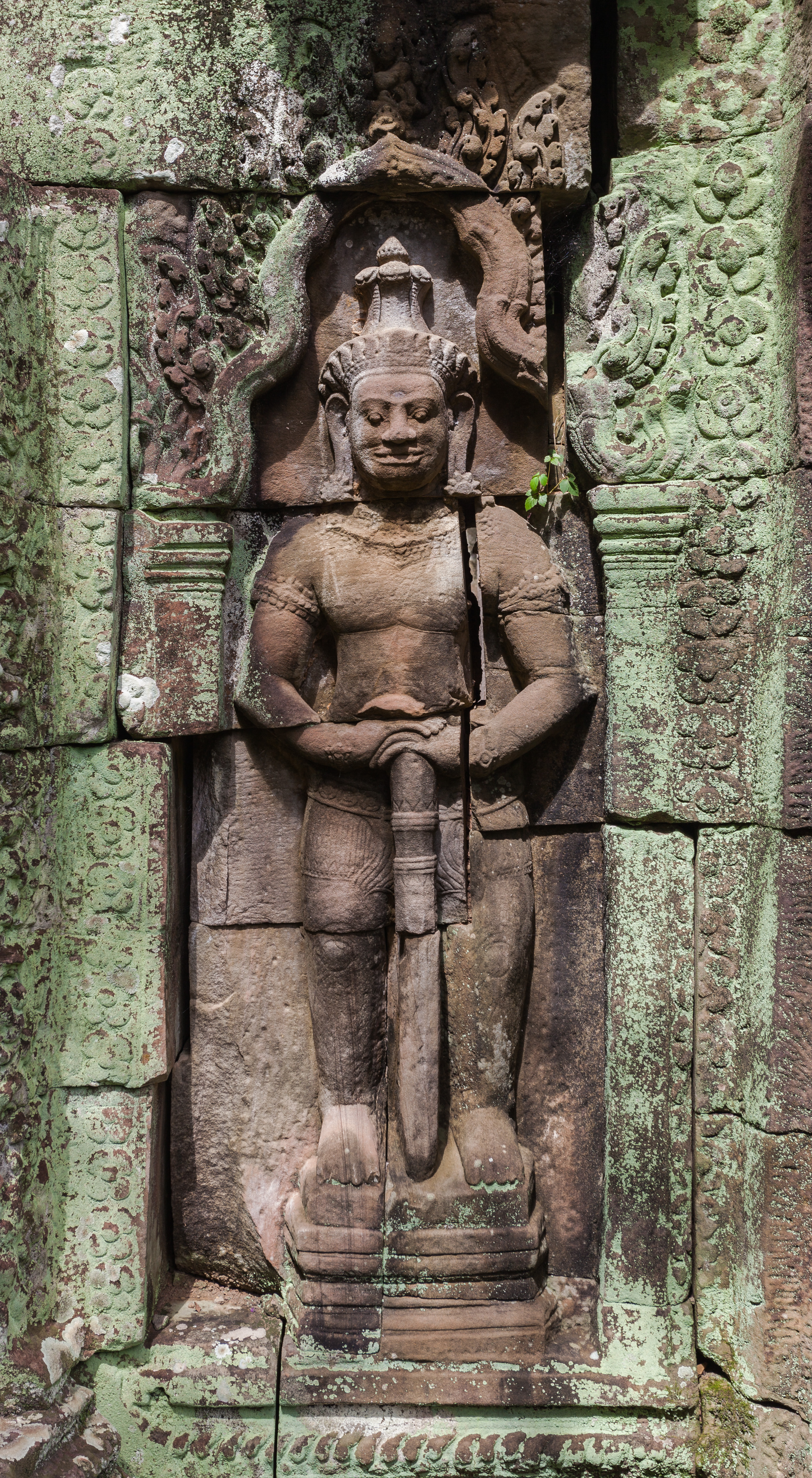
Dvarapala at Banteay Kdei in Angkor, Cambodia

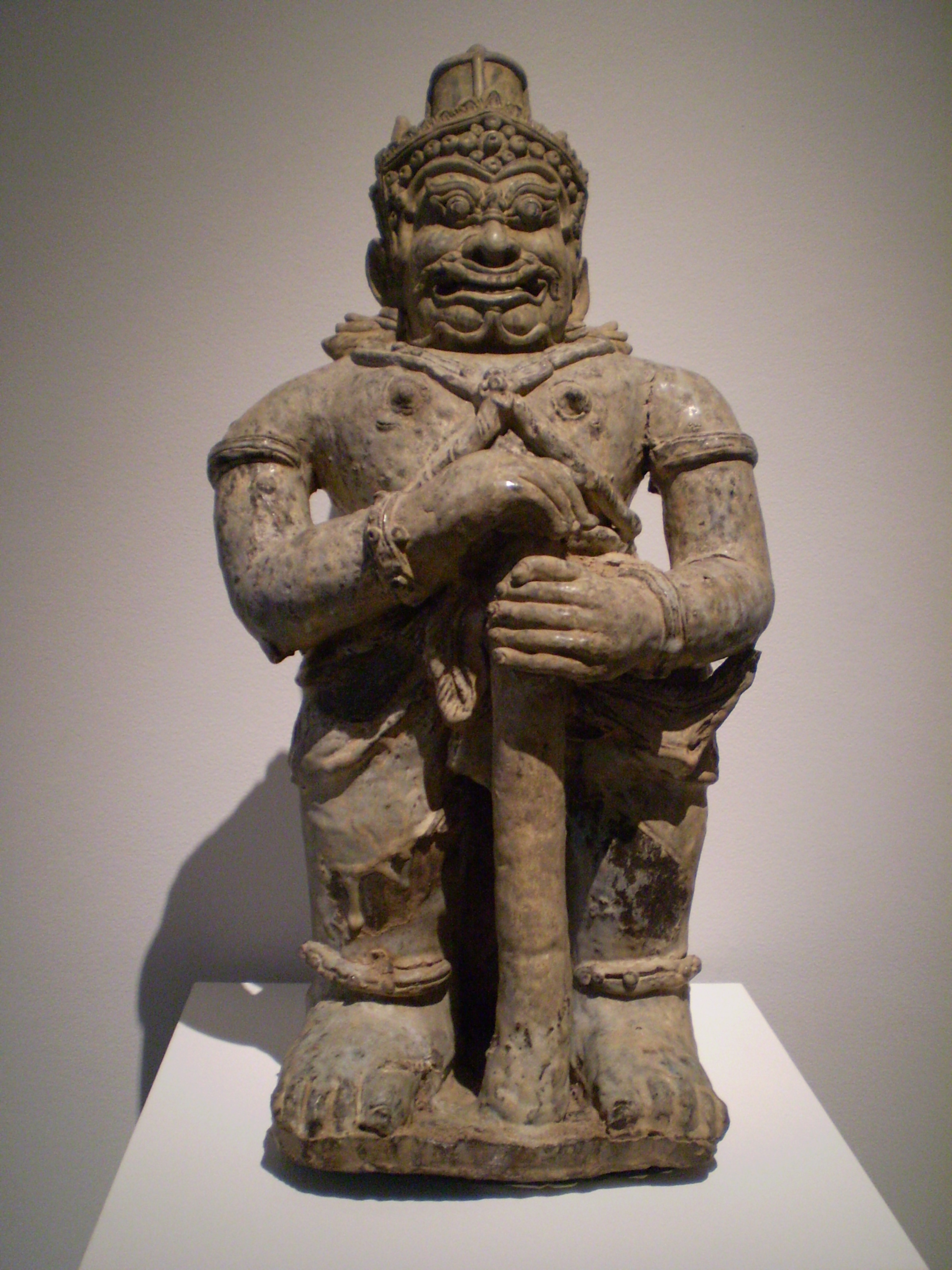
Dvarapala Sukhothai and Ayutthaya, 14th and 16th centuries Thailand.

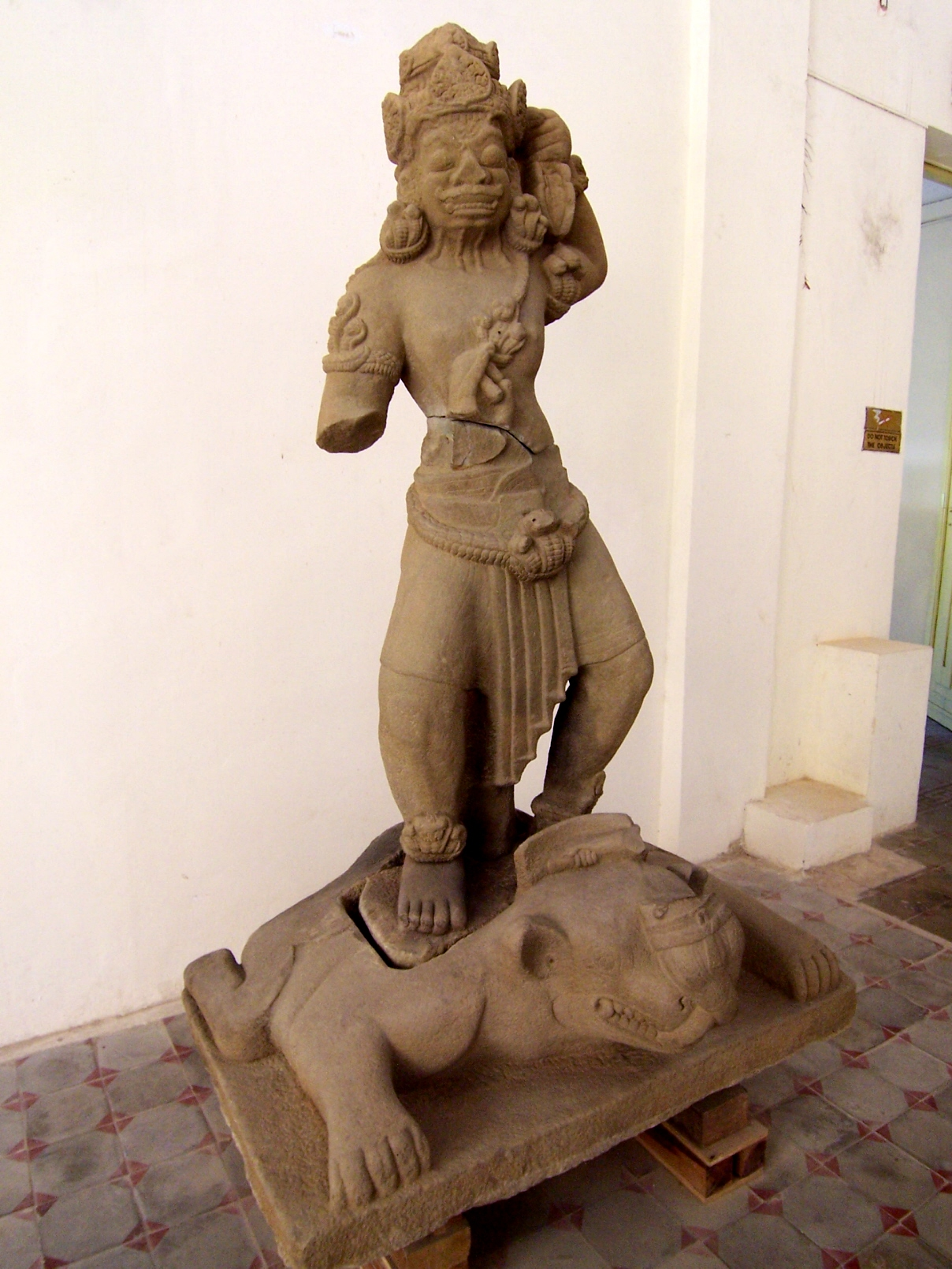
Late 9th or early 10th century dvarapala from Indrapura (Dong Duong), Champa, Vietnam.

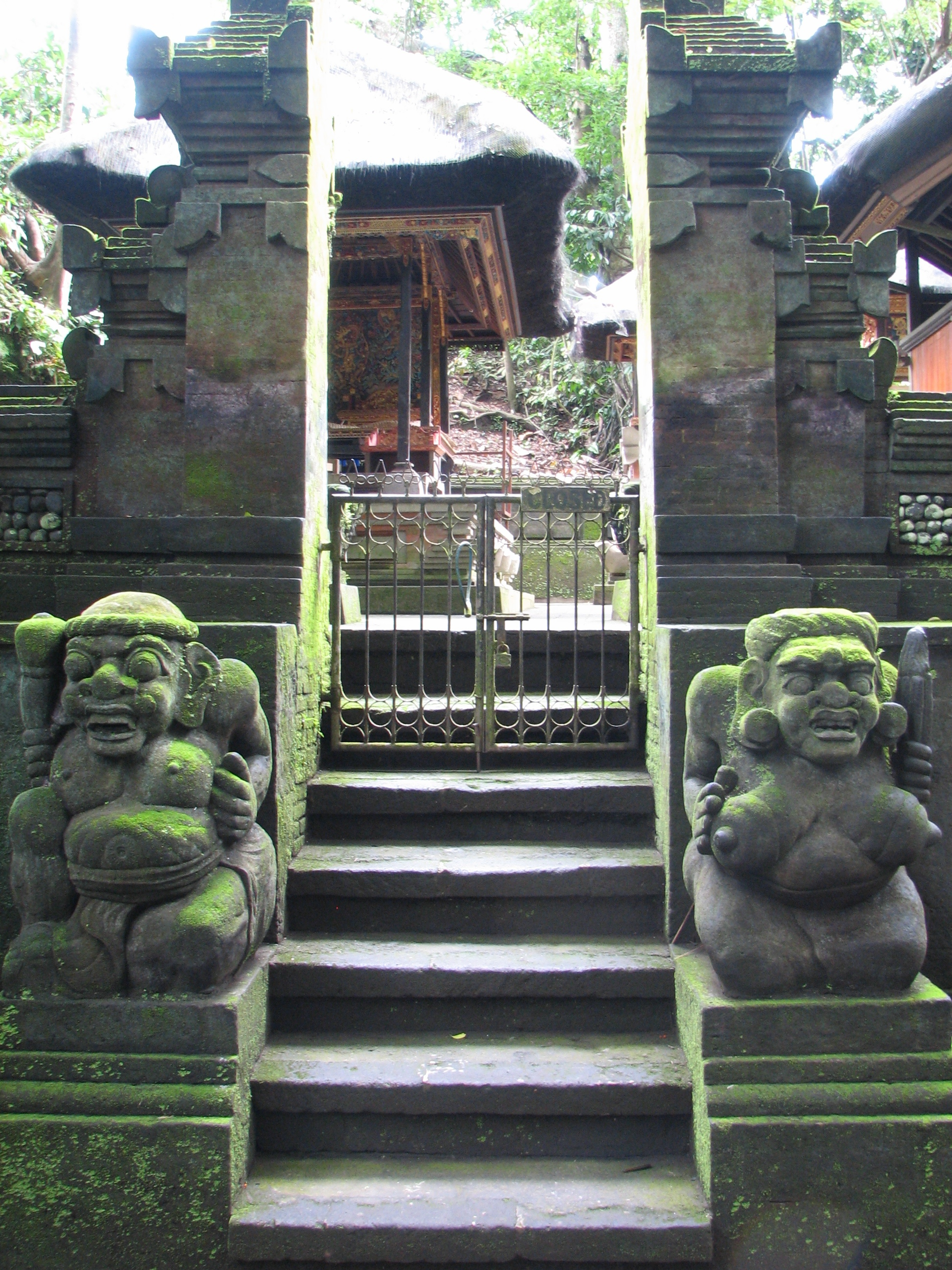
A pair of male and female dvarapalas guarding gate of a Hindu temple in Bali, Indonesia.

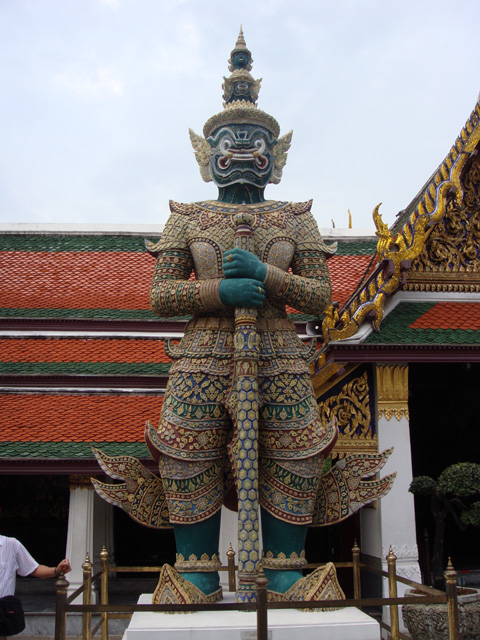
Dvarapala Yaksha (Thai: ยักษ์) of the Grand Palace, Bangkok, Thailand

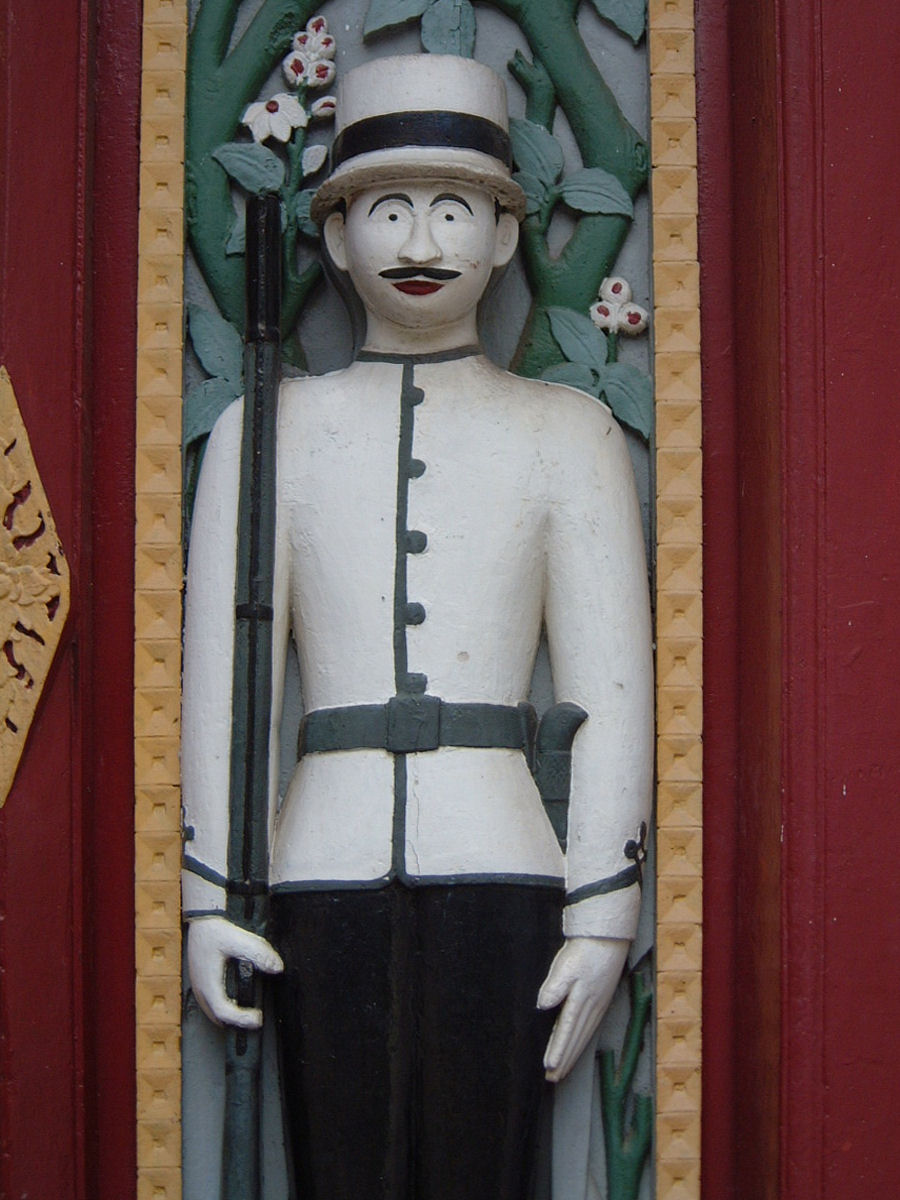
Contemporary soldier dvarapala as doorkeeper at Wat Ratchabophit, Bangkok

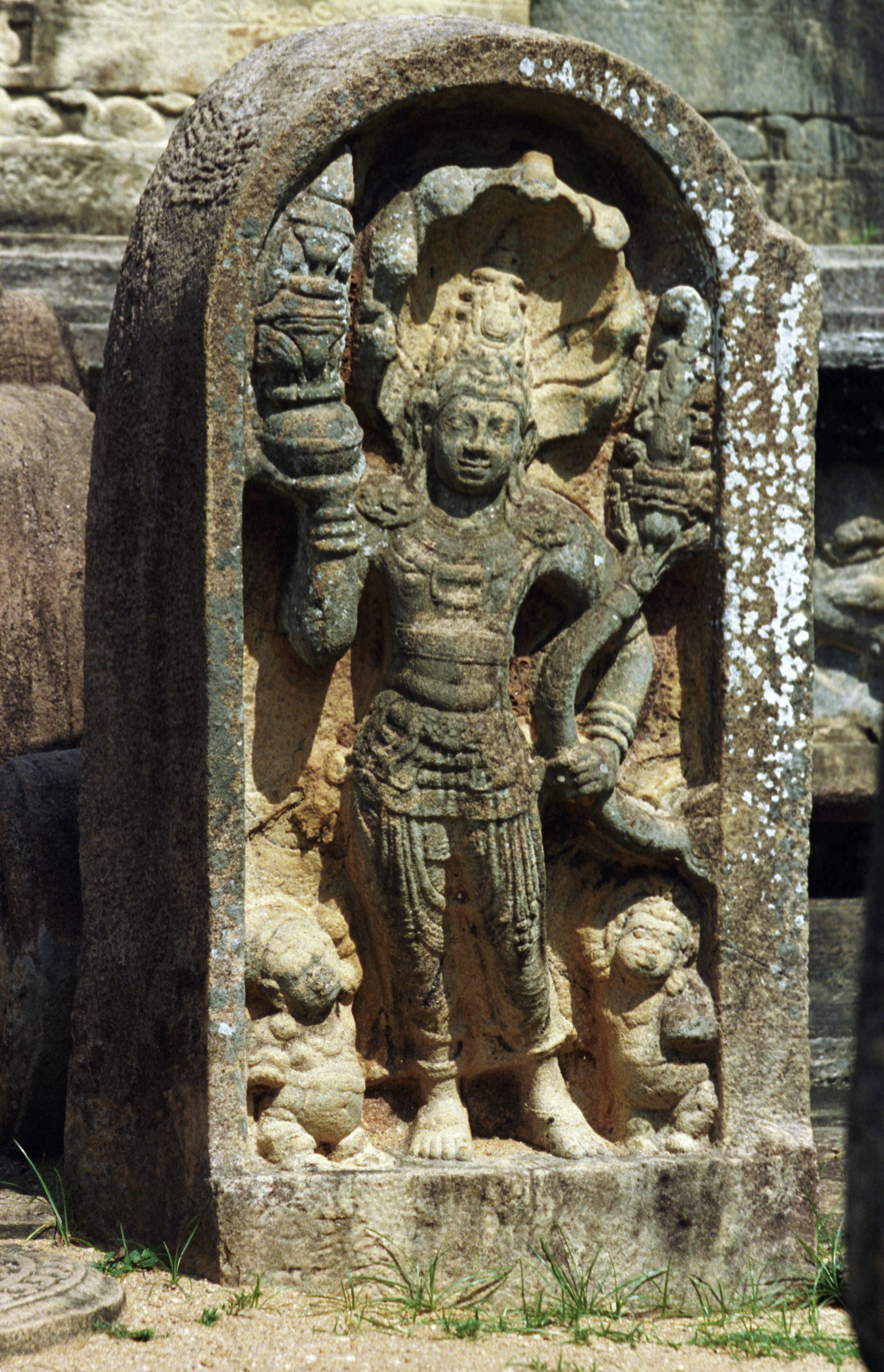
Dvarapala at the entrance of Hatadage, Polonnaruwa, Sri Lanka

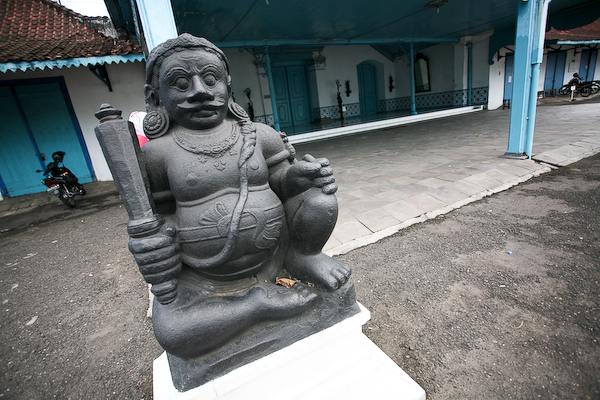
Dvarapala at the Kraton of Surakarta, Indonesia

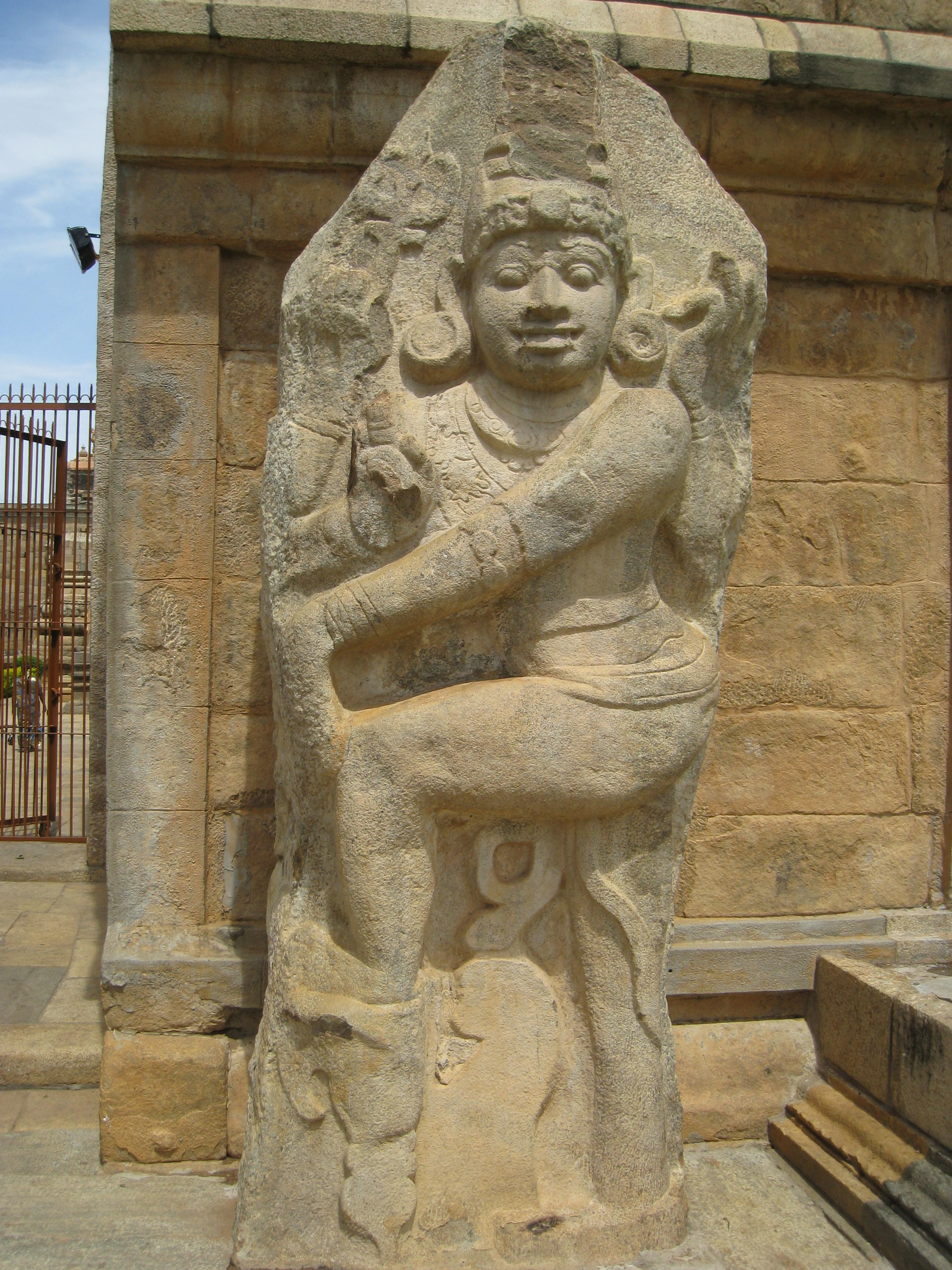
Dvarapalaka, 11th century (Chola dynasty), Tamil Nadu, India

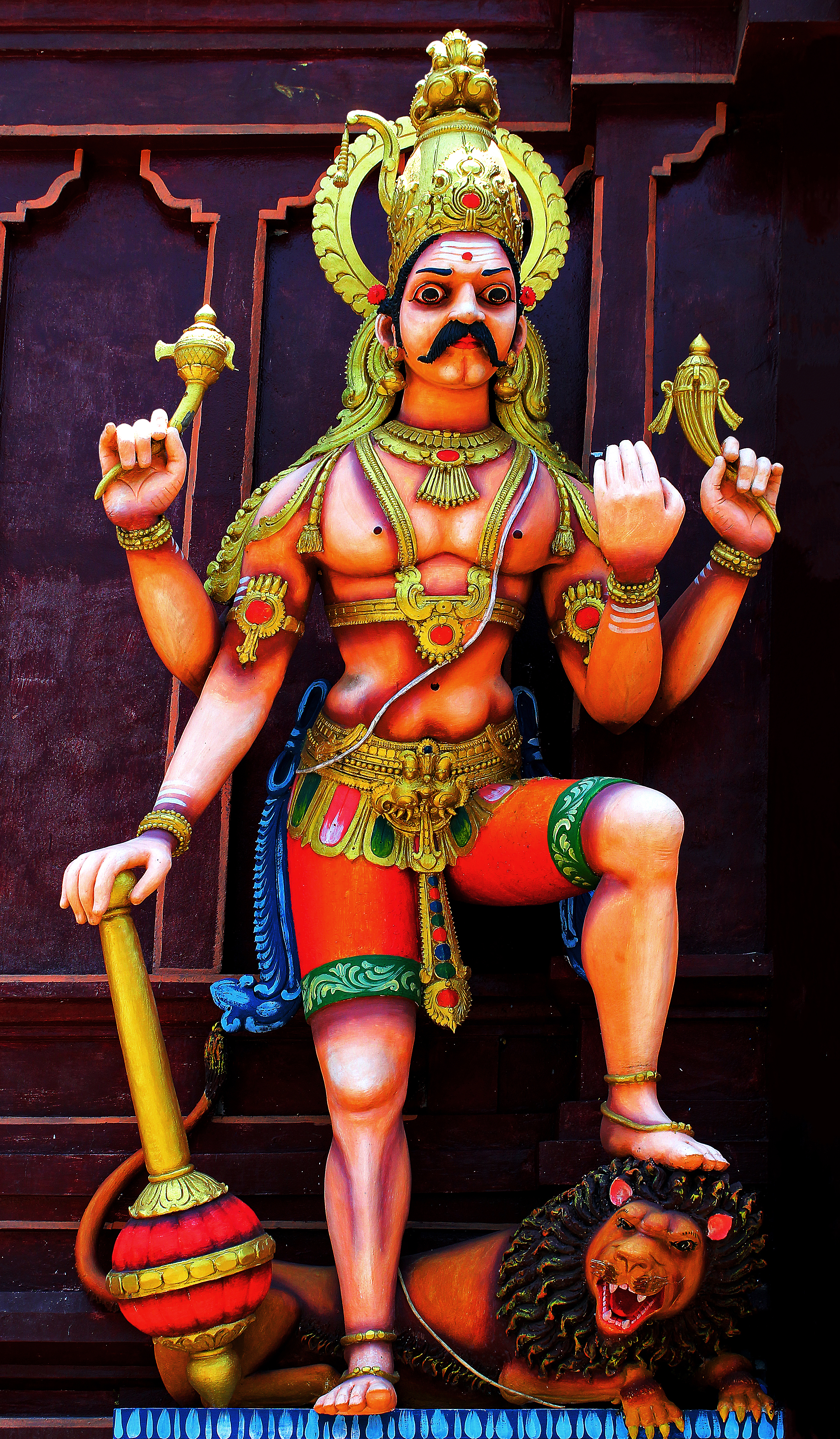
Guardian statue at a Hindu temple in Sri Lanka.

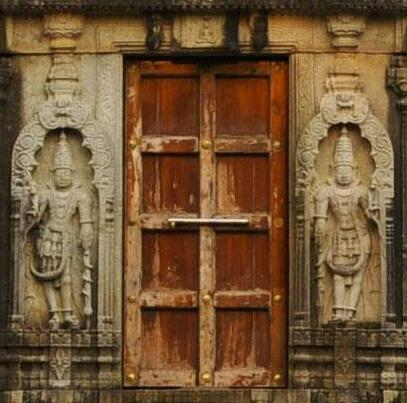
Pair of Dvarapala at Chaturmukha Basadi, India

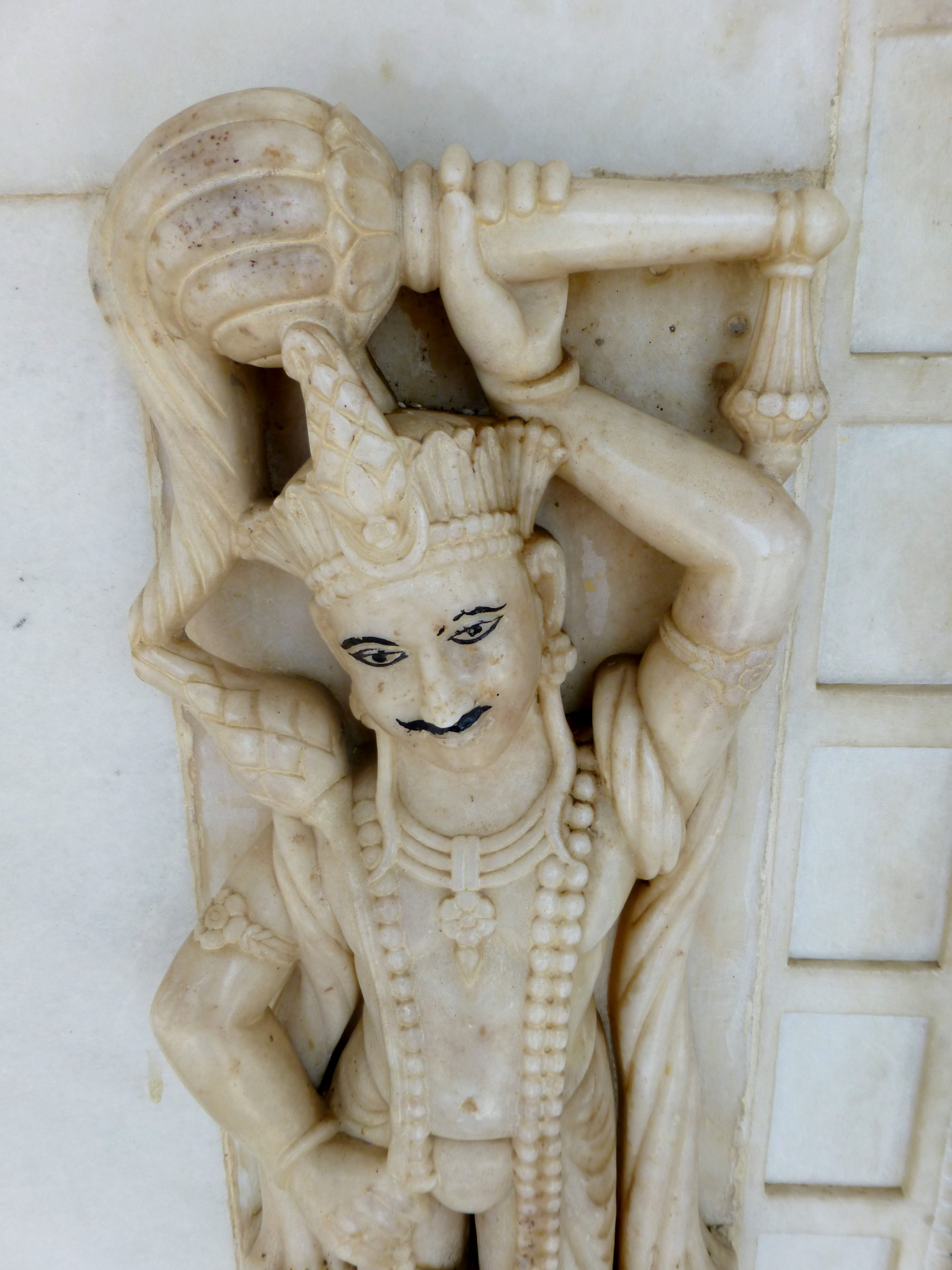
Dwaarpalas at a Jain temple

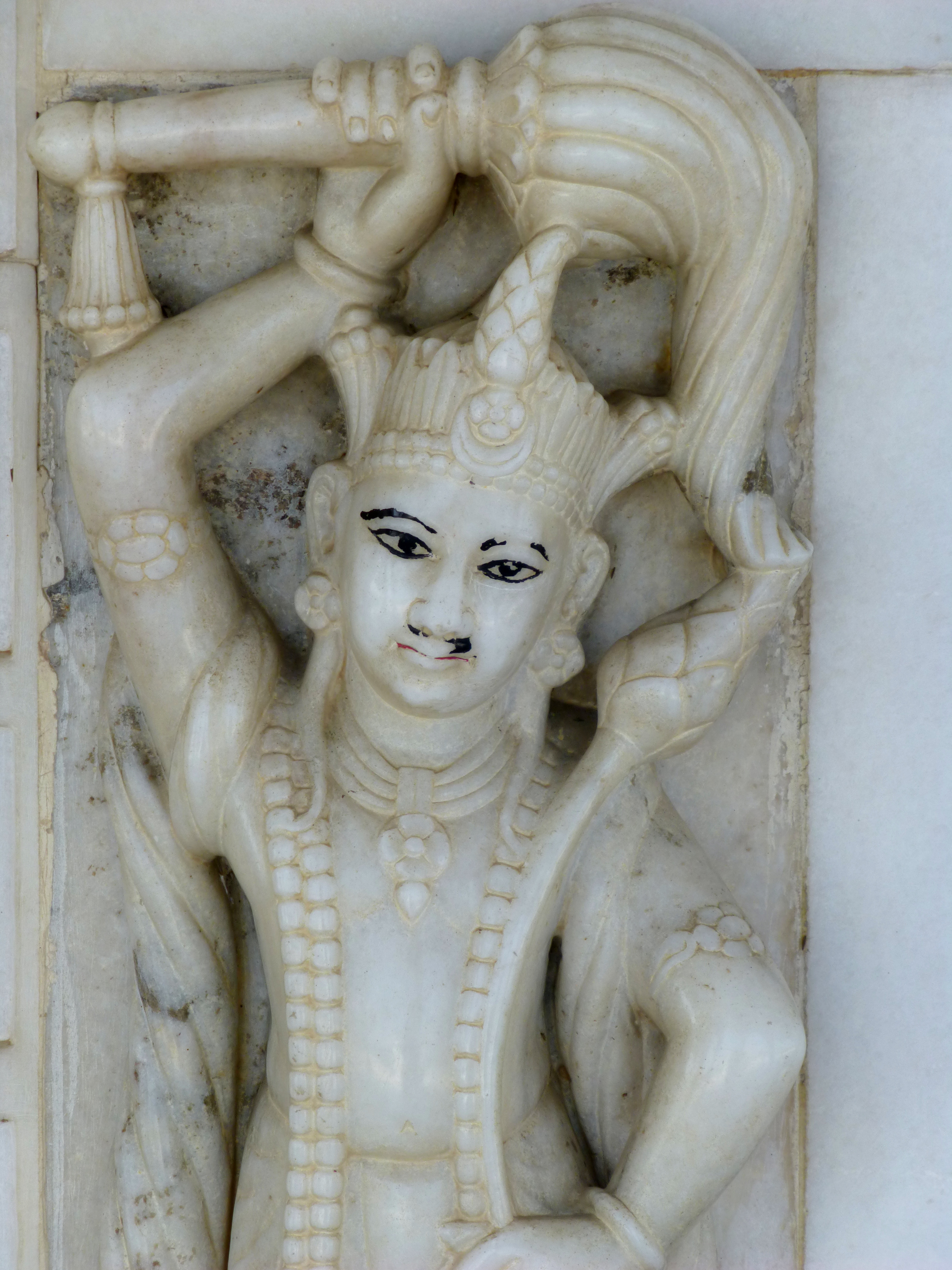
Dwaarpalas at a Jain temple

== See also ==
- Buddhist architecture
- Dharmapala
- Hindu architecture
- Lokapālas
- Nio
- Tutelary deity
- Yaksha
