= Kalakeyas =

Sect of danavas in Hinduism

The kalakeyas (Sanskrit: कालकेय, romanized: Kālakeya) or kalakhanjas (Sanskrit: कालखञ्ज, romanized: kālakhañjā) are a sect of danavas in Hinduism, referring to the children of Kashyapa and Kala. Sixty-thousand kalakeyas are said to exist, and they are described to fight under the asura banner, under Vritra, as well as other rulers.

== Hinduism ==
=== Mahabharata ===
In the Tirtha-yatra Parva of the Mahabharata, the devas requested Sage Agastya to drink the ocean where the kalakeyas resided, so that they may be defeated in battle. After the sage had completed this extraordinary feat, the devas assailed their foes, and were able to vanquish them in battle. The survivors of the sect sought refuge in Patala, the netherworld.

In the Vana Parva, the kalakeyas, allied with the nivatakavachas, waged war on the devas, attacking Devaloka. They were able to inflict a defeat on their enemies. In retaliation, Indra tasked his son, Arjuna, with the mission of destroying the nivatakavachas, accompanied by his own charioteer, Matali. After fulfilling this task, while returning to Devaloka, Arjuna came across a splendid city. Matali told him that the city was called Hiranyapura, the golden city, and had been created by Brahma as a result of a boon. The boon had been sought by two asura women named Puloma and Kala, who wished that their sons, the paulomas and the kalakeyas, would be invincible against the devas, the nagas, and the rakshasas. However, they had sought no protection against the human beings. Matali urged Arjuna to destroy them, as they were the enemies of Indra as well. Arjuna attacked Hiranyapura, and the danavas within mounted a powerful defence, boasting skilled warriors and numerous chariots that manouvered artfully against him. Arjuna employed the astra of Shiva against them, which gave rise to various monstrous, multiple-headed beasts that finally devoured the male inhabitants of the city, and the survivors were slain by the prince's barrage of arrows.

== Buddhism ==
In Pali they are called the Kālakañjakas. Referred to as "terrible-faced", these beings are considered to be a class of Asuras. They were present at the preaching of the Mahāsamaya Sutta and are spoken of as being of a fearsome shape (D.ii.259; also DA.iii.789.820).

They are the very lowest of those beings in the Asura realm.

Bodhisattvas are never born among the Kālakañjakas (J.i.44; BuA.224). Sometimes (E.g., J.v.187; PvA.272), when Asuras are mentioned, the Commentaries explain the word as referring to the Kālakañjakas.

Beings born into this state suffer from excessive thirst, which they are unable to quench even by immersing themselves in the Ganges. (For a story of one of them see VibhA.5). The Kājakañjakas resemble the pretas in shape, sex-life, diet and length of life, and they intermarry with them (Kvu.360).

== See also ==
- Asura
- Daityas
- Danavas
- List of Asuras
- Nivatakavacha
