= Hindu cosmology =

Description of the universe in Hindu texts

Hindu cosmology is the description of the universe and its states of matter, cycles within time, physical structure, and effects on living entities according to Hindu texts. Hindu cosmology is also intertwined with the idea of a creator who allows the world to exist and take shape.

== Substance ==
All matter is based on three inert gunas (qualities or tendencies):

- sattva (goodness)
- rajas (passion)
- tamas (darkness)

There are three states of the gunas that make up all matter in the universe:

- pradhana (root matter): gunas in an unmixed and unmanifested state (equilibrium).
- prakriti (primal matter): gunas in a mixed and unmanifested state (agitated).
- mahat-tattva (matter or universal womb): gunas in a mixed and manifested state.

Pradhana, which has no consciousness or will to act on its own, is initially agitated by a primal desire to create from Purusha. The different schools of thought differ in understanding about the ultimate source of that desire and what the gunas are mixed with (eternal elements, time, jiva-atmas).

The manifest material elements (matter) range from the most subtle to the most physical (gross). These material elements cover the individual, spiritual jiva-atmas (embodied souls), allowing them to interact with the material sense objects, such as their temporary material bodies, other conscious bodies, and unconscious objects.

Manifested subtle elements (a.k.a. antahkarana, the inner functions): (Note: In Bhagavad Gita 7.4, Krishna says "Air, water, earth, fire, sky, mind, intelligence and ahankaar (ego) together constitute the nature created by me.")

- ahamkara (ego)
- buddhi (intelligence)
- manas (mind)

Manifested physical (gross) elements (a.k.a. Pancha Bhuta, the five elements) and their associated senses and sense organs that manifest:

- akasha (aether) > sound > ear
- vayu (air) > touch > skin
- agni (fire) > sight/form > eye
- apas (water) > taste > tongue
- prithvi (earth) > smell > nose

== Time ==
Time is infinite with a cyclic universe, where the current universe was preceded and will be followed by an infinite number of universes. The different states of matter are guided by eternal kala (time), which repeats general events ranging from a moment to the lifespan of the universe, which is cyclically created and destroyed.

The earliest mentions of cosmic cycles in Sanskrit literature are found in the Yuga Purana (c. 1st century BCE), the Mahabharata (c. 3rd century BCE – 4th century CE), and the Manusmriti (c. 2nd – 3rd centuries CE). In the Mahabharata, there are inconsistent names applied to the cycle of creation and destruction, a name theorized as still being formulated, where yuga (generally, an age of time) and kalpa (a day of Brahma) are used, or a day of Brahma, the creator god, or simply referred to as the process of creation and destruction, with kalpa and day of Brahma becoming more prominent in later writings.

Prakriti (primal matter) remains mixed for a maha-kalpa (life of Brahma) of 311.04 trillion years, and is followed by a maha-pralaya (great dissolution) of equal length. The universe (matter) remains manifested for a kalpa (day of Brahma) of 4.32 billion years, where the universe is created at the start and destroyed at the end, only to be recreated at the start of the next kalpa. A kalpa is followed by a pralaya (partial dissolution, a.k.a. night of Brahma) of equal length, when Brahma and the universe are in an unmanifested state. Each kalpa has 15 manvantara-sandhyas (junctures of great flooding) and 14 manvantaras (age of Manu, progenitor of mankind), with each manvantara lasting for 306.72 million years. Each kalpa has 1,000 and each manvantara has 71 chatur-yugas (epoch, a.k.a. maha-yuga), with each chatur-yuga lasting for 4.32 million years and divided into four yugas (dharmic ages): Satya Yuga (1,728,000 years), Treta Yuga (1,296,000 years), Dvapara Yuga (864,000 years), and Kali Yuga (432,000 years), of which we are currently in Kali Yuga.

== Life ==
The individual, spiritual jiva-atma (embodied soul) is the life force or consciousness within a living entity. Jivas are eternal; they are not created or destroyed, and are distinct from the created unconscious matter. The gunas in their manifest state of matter, cover the jivas in various ways based on each jiva's karma and impressions. This material covering of matter allows the jivas to interact with the material sense objects that make up the material universe, such as their temporary material bodies, other conscious bodies, and unconscious objects.

Material creation is called maya and is characterized as impermanent (non-eternal), sometimes manifest and sometimes not. It has been compared to a dream or virtual reality, where the viewer (jiva) has real experiences with objects that will eventually become unreal.

Through the interactions with the material sense objects, a jiva starts to identify the temporary material body as the true self, and in this way becomes influenced and bound by maya perpetually in a conscious state of nescience (ignorance, unawareness, forgetfulness). This conscious state of nescience leads to samsara (cycle of reincarnation), only to end for a jiva when moksha (liberation) is achieved through self-realization (atman-jnana) or remembrance of one's true spiritual self/nature. Taking action to develop this state of awareness of ones true identity, and to understand the illusionary nature of maya is known as striving for moksha. Hindus believe that dharma is a means to moksha, thus perfecting dharma is one such action. The spiritual practice known as sadhna is another action. The jiva is considered the place where all positive qualities within us are housed, yet remain hidden due to the "layers of maya".

The different schools of thought differ in understanding about the initial event that led to the jivas entering the material creation and the ultimate state of moksha.

== Creation and structure ==
Hinduism is a group of distinct intellectual or philosophical points of view, rather than a rigid common set of beliefs. It includes a range of viewpoints about the origin of life. Hindu texts do not provide a single canonical account of the creation; they mention a range of theories of the creation of the world, some of which are apparently contradictory.

=== Rigveda ===
According to Henry White Wallis, the Rigveda and other Vedic texts are full of alternative cosmological theories and philosophical questions. To its numerous open-ended questions, the Vedic texts present a diversity of thought, in verses imbued with symbols and allegory that sometimes clothe the forces and agencies of the cosmos anthropomorphically with distinct personalities. In the Rigveda, three realms are primarily mentioned: earth (pṛthivī), sky (dyaus), and the region between the two (antarikṣa). These are sub-dvided into further regions. The sky and earth are analogized to the two wheels of the chariot of Indra and in another verse as two bowls.

==== Hiranyagarbha sukta (golden egg) ====
Rigveda 10.121 mentions the Hiranyagarbha ("hiranya = golden or radiant" and "garbha = filled / womb") that existed as the source of the creation of the universe, similar to the world egg motif found in creation myths of many other civilizations.

This metaphor has been interpreted differently by later texts. The Samkhya texts state that Purusha and Prakriti made the embryo, from which the world emerged. In another tradition, the creator god Brahma emerged from the egg and created the world, while in yet another tradition Brahma himself is the Hiranyagarbha. The nature of the Purusha, the creation of the gods and other details of the embryo creation myth have been described variously by the later Hindu texts.

==== Purusha Sukta ====
The Purusha Sukta (RV 10.90) describes a myth of proto-Indo-European origin, in which creation arises out of the various body parts of the Purusha, a Primeval Cosmic Being. Purusha is described as all that has ever existed and will ever exist. This being's body was the origin of four different kinds of people: the Brahmin, the Rajanya, the Vaishya, and the Shudra. Viraj, variously interpreted as the mundane egg (see Hiranyagarbha) or the twofold male-female energy, was born from Purusha, and the Purusha was born again from Viraj. The gods then performed a yajna with the Purusha, leading to the creation of the other things in the manifested world from his various body parts and his mind. These things included the animals, the Vedas, the Varnas, the celestial bodies, the air, the sky, the heavens, the earth, the directions, and the Gods Indra and Agni.

The later texts such as the Puranas identify the Purusha with God. In many Puranic notes, Brahma is the creator god. However, some Puranas also identify Vishnu, Shiva or Devi as the creator.

==== Nasadiya Sukta ====
The Nasadiya Sukta (RV 10.129) takes a near-agnostic stand on the creation of the primordial beings (such as the gods who performed the sacrifice of the Purusha), stating that the gods came into being after the world's creation, and nobody knows when the world first came into being. It asks who created the universe, does anyone really know, and whether it can ever be known. The Nasadiya Sukta states:

Darkness there was at first, by darkness hidden;
Without distinctive marks, this all was Energy;
That which, becoming, by the void was covered;
That One by force of heat came into being;

Who really knows? Who will here proclaim it?
Whence was it produced? Whence is this creation?
Gods came afterwards, with the creation of this universe.
Who then knows whence it has arisen?

Whether God's will created it, or whether He was mute;
Perhaps it formed itself, or perhaps it did not;
Only He who is its overseer in highest heaven knows,
Only He knows, or perhaps He does not know.

— Rigveda 10:129–6

==== Other hymns ====
The early hymns of Rigveda also mention Tvastar as the first born creator of the human world.

The Devi sukta (RV 10.125) identifies a goddess, identified as the cosmic form of Speech, with the creator, empowering, nourishing and giving joy to gods and humans.

Rig Veda (RV) 10.72 states:

1. Now amid acclaim we will proclaim the births of the gods,
so that one in a later generation will see (them) as the hymns are recited.
2 The Lord of the Sacred Formulation [=Bhṛaspati] smelted these (births) like a smith
In the ancient generation of the gods, what exists was born from what does not exist.
3 In the first generation of the gods, what exists was born from what does not exist.
The regions of space were born following that (which exists)—that(which exists) was born from the one whose feet were opened up.

— Bṛhaspati Āṅgirasa, Bṛhaspati Laukya, or Aditi Dākṣāyaṇī, The Gods, Rig Veda 10.72.1-3

RV 1.24 asks, "these stars, which are set on high, and appear at night, whither do they go in the daytime?" RV 10.88 wonders, "how many fires are there, how many suns, how many dawns, how many waters? I am not posing an awkward question for you fathers; I ask you, poets, only to find out?"

=== Brahmanas ===
The Shatapatha Brahmana mentions a story of creation, in which the Prajapati performs tapas to reproduce himself. He releases the waters and enters them in the form of an egg that evolves into the cosmos. The Prajapati emerged from the golden egg, and created the earth, the middle regions and the sky. With further tapas, he created the devas. He also created the asuras, and the darkness came into the being. It also contains a story similar to the other great flood stories. After the great flood, Manu the only surviving human, offers a sacrifice from which Ida is born. From her, the existing human race comes into the being.

The Shatapatha Brahmana states that the current human generation descends from Manu, the only man who survived a great deluge after being warned by the God. This legend is comparable to the other flood legends, such as the story of the Noah's Ark mentioned in the Bible and the Quran.

=== Upanishads ===
The Aitareya Upanishad (3.4.1) mentions that only the Atman (Soul or the Self) existed in the beginning. The Self created the heaven (Ambhas), the sky (Marikis), the earth (Mara) and the underworld (Ap). He also created the speech, the fire, the prana (breath of life), the air and the various senses, the directions, the trees, the mind, the moon and other things.

The Brihadaranyaka Upanishad (1.4) mentions that in the beginning, only the Atman existed as the Purusha. Feeling lonely, the Purusha divided itself into two parts: Male ("Pati") and female ("patni"). The men were born when the male embraced the female. The female thought "He must embrace me and then He embraced her. Similarly, everything that exists in pairs, was created." Next, the Purusha created the fire, the soma and the immortal gods (the devas) from his better part. He also created the various powers of the gods, the different classes, the dharma (law or duty) and so on. The Chhandogya states that the Brahman creates, sustains and destroys the world. A similar perspective is also portrayed in the Mundak Upanishad verse 2.1.10, which states "puruṣa evedaṃ viśvaṃ karma tapo brahma parāmṛtam", meaning "out of this Purush, everything is born, and by knowing him, everything becomes known"

=== Puranas ===
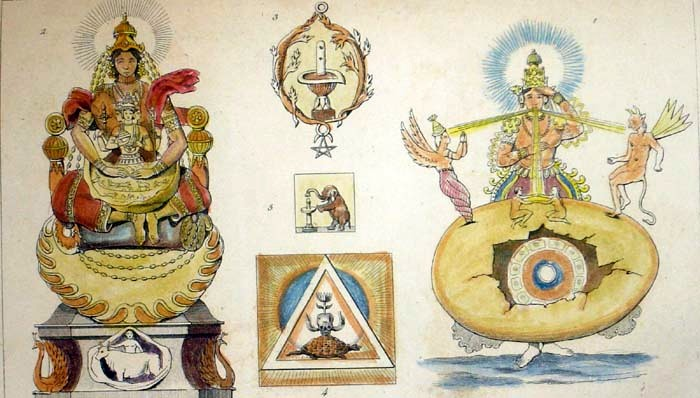
An attempt to depict the creative activities of Prajapati; a steel engraving from the 1850s

The Puranas genre of Indian literature, found in Hinduism and Jainism, contain a section on cosmology and cosmogony as a requirement. There are dozens of different Mahapuranas and Upapuranas, each with its own theory integrated into a proposed human history consisting of solar and lunar dynasties. Some are similar to Indo-European creation myths, while others are novel. One cosmology, shared by Hindu, Buddhist and Jain texts involves Mount Meru, with stars and sun moving around it using Dhruva (North Star) as the focal reference. According to Annette Wilke and Oliver Moebus, the diversity of cosmology theories in Hinduism may reflect its tendency to not reject new ideas and empirical observations as they became available, but to adapt and integrate them creatively.

In the later Puranic texts, the creator god Brahma is described as performing the act of "creation", or more specifically of "propagating life within the universe". Some texts consider him equivalent to the Hiranyagarbha or the Purusha, while others state that he arose out of these. Brahma is a part of the trimurti of gods that also includes Vishnu and Shiva, who are responsible for "preservation" and "destruction" (of the universe) respectively.

In Garuda Purana, there was nothing in the universe except Brahman. The universe became an expanse of water, and in that golden egg, Vishnu created Brahma with four faces. Brahma then created the devas, asuras, pitris and manushas. He also created the rakshasas, yakshas, and gandharvas. Other creatures came from the various parts of his body (e.g. snakes from his hair, sheep from his chest, goats from his mouth, cows from his stomach, others from his feet). His body hair became herbs. The four varnas came from his body parts and the four Vedas from his mouths. He created several sons from his mind: Daksha, Daksha's wife, Manu Svaymbhuva, his wife Shatarupta and the rishi Kashyapa. Kashyapa married thirteen of Daksha's daughters and all the devas and the creatures were born through them. Other Puranas and the Manu Smriti mention several variations of this theory.

In Vishnu Purana, the Purusha is same as the creator deity Brahma, and is a part of Vishnu. The Shaivite texts mention the Hiranyagarbha as a creation of Shiva.

==== Brahmanda (cosmic egg) ====
According to Richard L. Thompson, the Bhagavata Purana presents a geocentric model of our Brahmanda (cosmic egg or universe), where our Bhu-mandala disk, equal in diameter to our Brahmanda, has a diameter of 500 million yojanas (trad. 8 miles each), which equals around 4 billion miles or more, a size far too small for the universe of stars and galaxies, but in the right range for the Solar System. In addition, the Bhagavata Purana and other Puranas speak of a multiplicity of universes, or Brahmandas, each covered by seven-fold layers with an aggregate thickness of over ten million times its diameter (5 × 10^{15} yojanas ≈ 6,804+ light-years in diameter). The Jyotisha Shastras, Surya Siddhanta, and Siddhānta Shiromani give the Brahmanda an enlarged radius of about 5,000 light years. Finally, the Mahabharata refers to stars as large, self-luminous objects that seem small because of their great distance, and that the Sun and Moon cannot be seen if one travels to those distant stars. Thompson notes that Bhu-mandala can be interpreted as a map of the geocentric orbits of the Sun and the five planets, Mercury through Saturn, and this map becomes highly accurate if we adjust the length of the yojana to about 8.5 miles.

Brahma, the first born and secondary creator, during the start of his kalpa, divides the Brahmanda (cosmic egg or universe), first into three, later into fourteen lokas (planes or realms)—sometimes grouped into heavenly, earthly and hellish planes—and creates the first living entities to multiply and fill the universe. Some Puranas describe innumerable universes existing simultaneously with different sizes and Brahmas, each manifesting and unmanifesting at the same time.

=== Indian philosophy ===
Samkhya texts state that there are two distinct fundamental eternal entities: Purusha and Prakriti. Prakriti has three qualities: sattva (purity or preservation), rajas (creation) and tamas (darkness or destruction). When the equilibrium between these qualities is broken, the act of creation starts. Rajas quality leads to creation.

Advaita Vedanta states that the creation arises from Brahman, but it is illusory and has no reality. The Mundak Upanishad verse 2.2.11 also states "brahmaivedamamṛtaṃ purastādbrahma paścādbrahma dakṣiṇataścottareṇa adhaścordhvaṃ ca prasṛtaṃ brahmaivedaṃ viśvamidaṃ variṣṭham", meaning "All this before is immortal Brahman; certainly all behind is Brahman; all to the south and to the north; all below and all above stretched out, all this is certainly Brahman", and suggests that Brahma is present throughout that creation.

For Vishishtadvaita Vedanta, the world is God's body (śarira). The world is not created ex nihilo. Creation exists in a subtle form (sūkṣma) after destruction (vilaya), so it is co-eternal with God.

=== Lokas ===
Deborah Soifer describes the development of the concept of lokas as follows:

The concept of a loka or lokas develops in the Vedic literature. Influenced by the special connotations that a word for space might have for a nomadic people, loka in the Veda did not simply mean place or world, but had a positive valuation: it was a place or position of religious or psychological interest with a special value of function of its own. Hence, inherent in the "loka" concept in the earliest literature was a double aspect; that is, coexistent with spatiality was a religious or soteriological meaning, which could exist independent of a spatial notion, an "immaterial" significance. The most common cosmological conception of lokas in the Veda was that of the trailokya or triple world: three worlds consisting of earth, atmosphere or sky, and heaven, making up the universe.

— Deborah A. Soifer

Patrick Olivelle explains that during the early vedic period the universe was viewed as consisting of three spheres (loka): the earth (bhūḥ), an intermediate region (bhuvaḥ), and the sky or firmament (svaḥ), which this tripartite cosmology was shared with other Indo-European peoples. In recent studies of vedic cosmology, Witzel (1984) has shown that the expression svarga loka ("bright world" or "heavenly world") refers specifically to the Milky Way. By the late vedic period, four higher spheres were added called Mahas, Janas, Tapas, and Satyaloka ("world of truth") or Brahmaloka ("world of Brahma"). Text from a much later period post-Upanishads posit seven parallel lower spheres or hells.

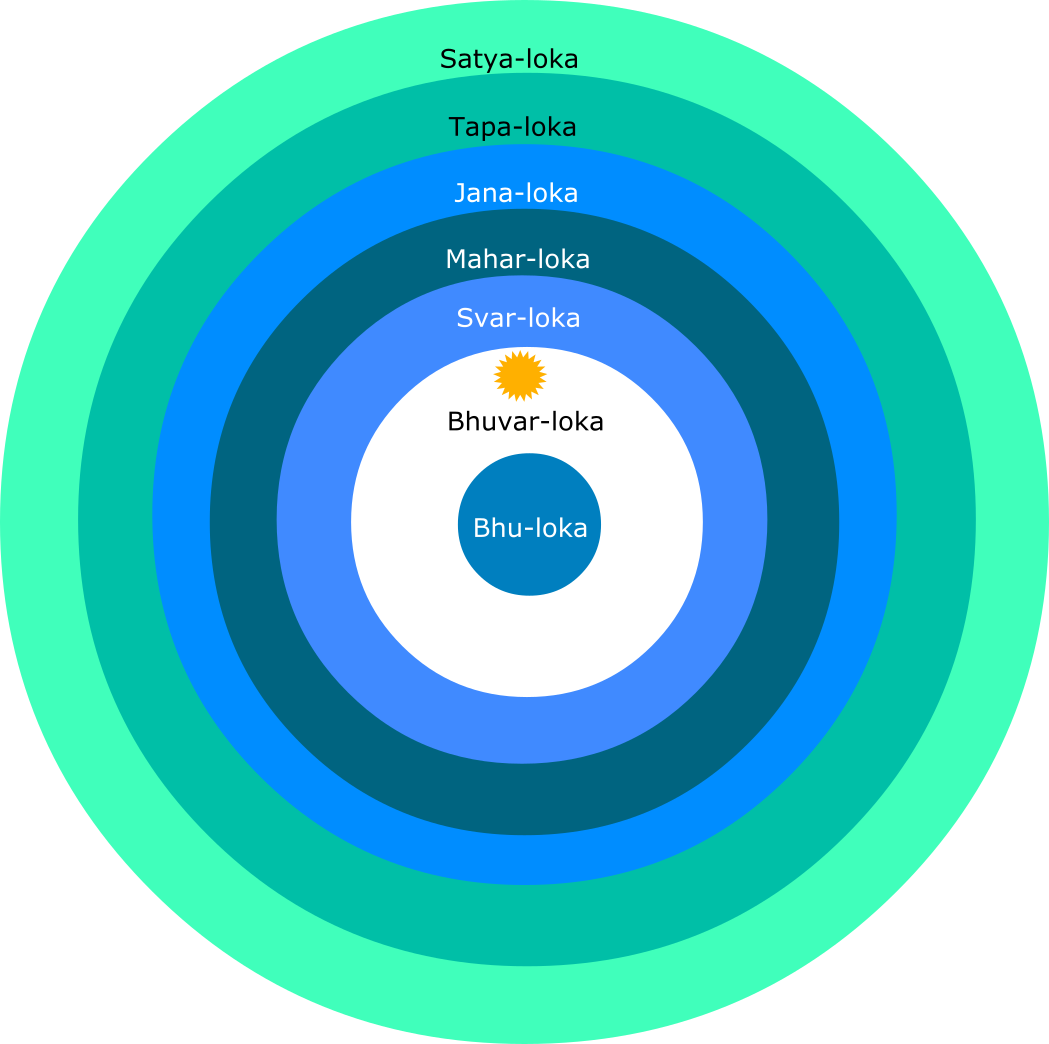
Upper seven Lokas in Hindu Cosmology

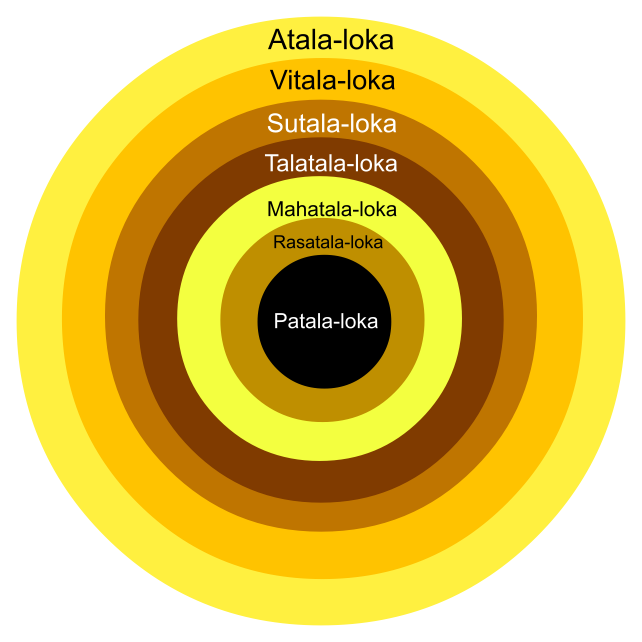
Lower seven Lokas in Puranas

In the Brahmanda Purana, as well as Bhagavata Purana (2.5), fourteen lokas (planes) are described, consist of seven higher (Vyahrtis) and seven lower (Patalas) lokas.

1. Satya-loka (Brahma-loka)
2. Tapa-loka
3. Jana-loka
4. Mahar-loka
5. Svar-loka (Svarga-loka or Indra-loka)
6. Bhuvar-loka (Sun/Moon plane)
7. Bhu-loka (Earth plane)
8. Atala-loka
9. Vitala-loka
10. Sutala-loka
11. Talatala-loka
12. Mahatala-loka
13. Rasatala-loka
14. Patala-loka

=== Multiple universes ===
The Hindu texts describe innumerable universes existing all at the same time moving around like atoms, each with its own Brahma, Vishnu, and Shiva.

Every universe is covered by seven layers—earth, water, fire, air, sky, the total energy and false ego—each ten times greater than the previous one. There are innumerable universes besides this one, and although they are unlimitedly large, they move about like atoms in You. Therefore You are called unlimited.

— Bhagavata Purana 6.16.37

Because You are unlimited, neither the lords of heaven nor even You Yourself can ever reach the end of Your glories. The countless universes, each enveloped in its shell, are compelled by the wheel of time to wander within You, like particles of dust blowing about in the sky. The śrutis, following their method of eliminating everything separate from the Supreme, become successful by revealing You as their final conclusion.

— Bhagavata Purana 10.87.41

The layers or elements covering the universes are each ten times thicker than the one before, and all the universes clustered together appear like atoms in a huge combination.

— Bhagavata Purana 3.11.41

And who will search through the wide infinities of space to count the universes side by side, each containing its Brahma, its Vishnu, its Shiva? Who can count the Indras in them all--those Indras side by side, who reign at once in all the innumerable worlds; those others who passed away before them; or even the Indras who succeed each other in any given line, ascending to godly kingship, one by one, and, one by one, passing away.

— Brahma Vaivarta Purana

Every thing that is any where, is produced from and subsists in space. It is always all in all things, which are contained as particles in it. Such is the pure vacuous space of the Divine understanding, that like an ocean of light, contains these innumerable worlds, which like the countless waves of the sea, are revolving for ever in it.

— Yoga Vasistha 3.30.16–17

There are many other large worlds, rolling through the immense space of vacuum, as the giddy goblins of Yakshas revel about in the dark and dismal deserts and forests, unseen by others.

— Yoga Vasistha 3.30.34

You know one universe. Living entities are born in many universes, like mosquitoes in many udumbara (cluster fig) fruits.

— Garga Samhita 1.2.28

== See also ==
- Brahmaloka
- Hindu calendar
- Hindu creationism
- Hindu eschatology
- Hindu idealism
- Hindu units of time
- Indian astronomy
- Loka
- Patala
- Epic-Puranic chronology
- Urdhva lokas
- Vaikuntha

== Bibliography ==
- González-Reimann, Luis (2018). "Cosmic Cycles, Cosmology, and Cosmography". In Basu, Helene; Jacobsen, Knut A.; Malinar, Angelika; Narayanan, Vasudha (eds.). Brill's Encyclopedia of Hinduism. Vol. 2. Leiden: Brill Publishers. doi:10.1163/2212-5019_BEH_COM_1020020. ISBN 978-90-04-17641-6. ISSN 2212-5019.
- Haug, Martin (1863). The Aitareya Brahmanam of the Rigveda, Containing the Earliest Speculations of the Brahmans on the Meaning of the Sacrificial Prayers. ISBN 0-404-57848-9.
- Joseph, George G. (2000). The Crest of the Peacock: Non-European Roots of Mathematics, 2nd edition. Penguin Books, London. ISBN 0-691-00659-8.
- Kak, Subhash C. (2000). "Birth and Early Development of Indian Astronomy". In Selin, Helaine (2000). Astronomy Across Cultures: The History of Non-Western Astronomy (303–340). Boston: Kluwer. ISBN 0-7923-6363-9.
