= Trailokya =

Three planes of existence in Indian religious cosmology

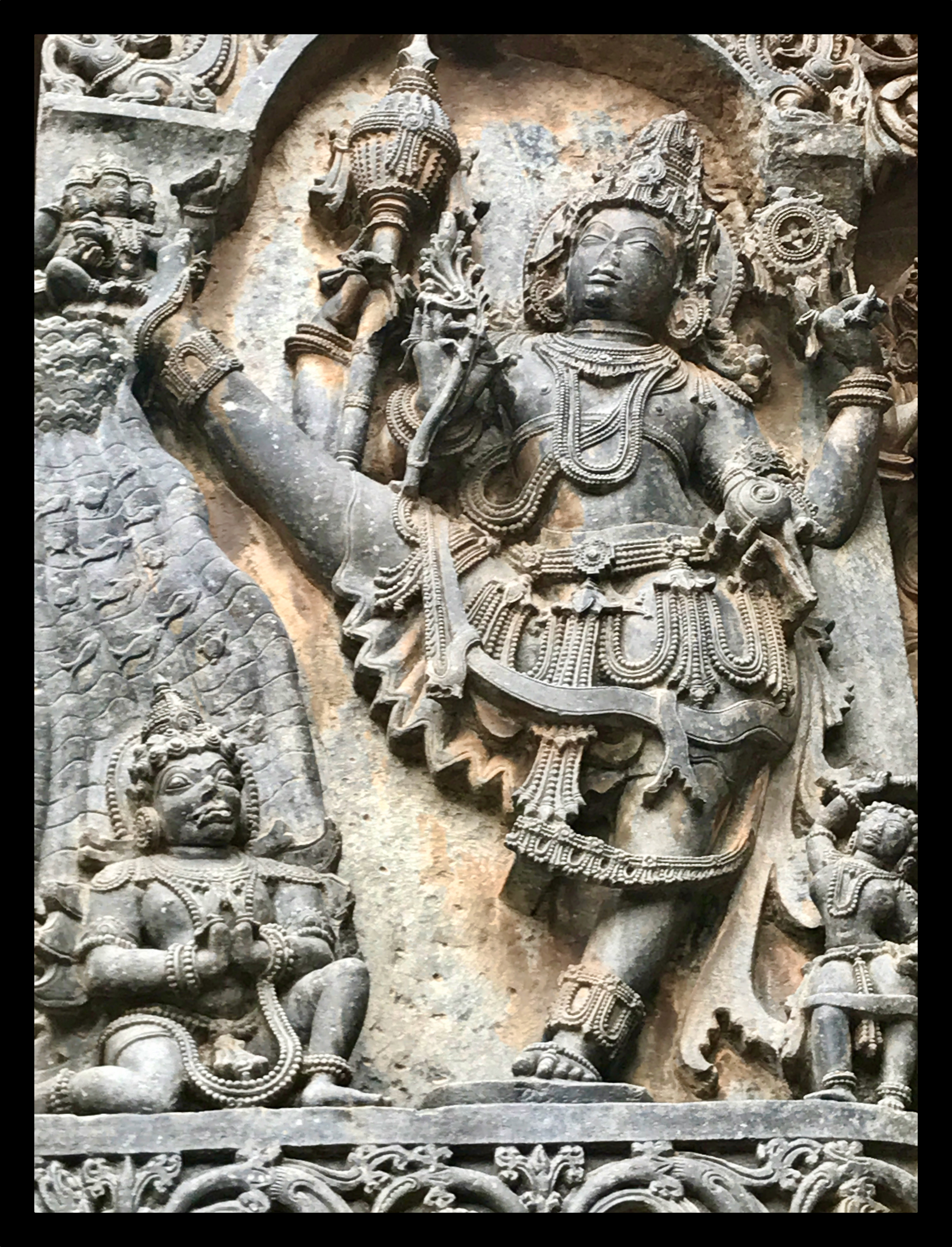
Sculpture of Vamana, an avatar of Vishnu, who is associated with the legend of taking three strides upon the three worlds

Trailokya (Sanskrit: त्रैलोक्य; Kannada: ತ್ರೈಲೋಕ್ಯ; Pali: tiloka, Tibetan: khams gsum; Chinese: 三界; Vietnamese: Tam Giới) literally means "three worlds". It can also refer to "three spheres," "three planes of existence," and "three realms".

Various schemas of three realms (tri-loka) appear in the main Indian religions of Hinduism, Buddhism and Jainism.

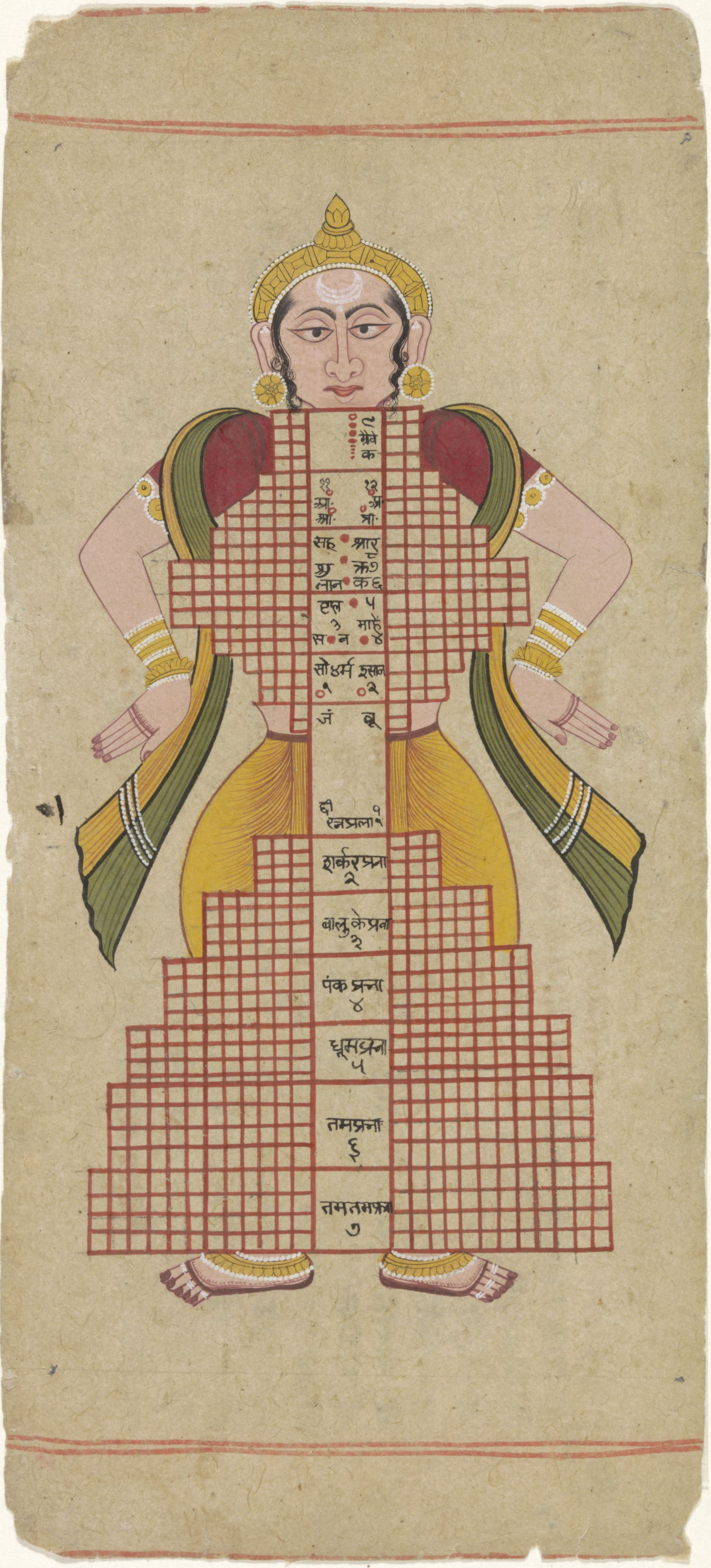
The Triloka Purusha, the figure who embodies the three worlds

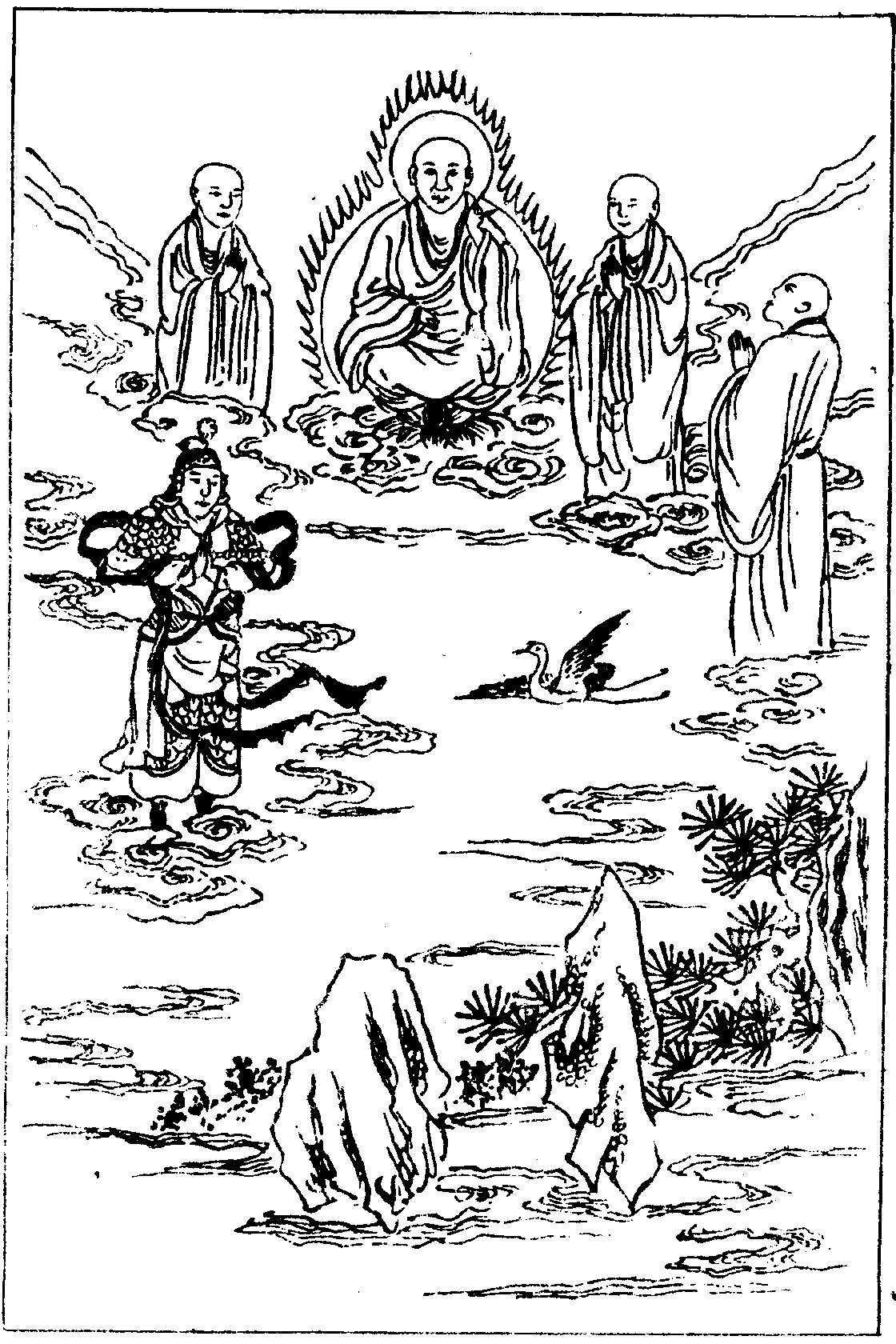
Transcending the Three Realms 超出三界圖, 1615 Xingming guizhi

== Hindu cosmology ==
The concept of three worlds has a number of different interpretations in Hindu cosmology.

- Traditionally, the three worlds refer to either the earth (Bhuloka), heaven (Svarga), and hell (Naraka), or the earth (Bhuloka), heaven (Svarga), and the netherworld (Patala).
- The Brahmanda Purana conceives them to be Bhūta (past), Bhavya (future), and Bhavat (present).
- In Vaishnavism, the three worlds are often described to be bhūr, bhuvaḥ, and svaḥ (the gross region, the subtle region, and the celestial region).
- In the Nilanamatapurana, Vamana covers his second step on the three worlds of Maharloka, Janaloka, and Tapaloka, all of which are regarded to be a part of the seven heavens.

== Buddhist cosmology ==
In Buddhism, the three worlds refer to the following destinations for karmic rebirth:

- Kāma-loka (world of desire), is a plane of existence typified by base desires, populated by hell beings, preta (hungry ghosts), animals, humans, lower demi-gods (asuras) and gods (devas) of the desire realm heavens.
- Rūpa-loka (world of form), a realm predominantly free of baser desires, populated by higher level devas. It is a possible rebirth destination for those well practiced in dhyāna (meditative absorption).
- Arūpa-loka (the world of formlessness), a non-corporeal realm populated with four heavens. It is a possible rebirth destination for practitioners of the four formlessness stages of meditation (arūpa-samāpatti).

According to Theravada Buddhism, these are all the realms of existence outside of nirvana, which transcends all three realms. According to Mahayana Buddhism however, the buddhafields (also known as pure lands) are lands which are beyond the three realms.

== Jain cosmology ==
The early Jains contemplated the nature of the earth and universe and developed a detailed hypothesis on the various aspects of astronomy and cosmology. According to the Jain texts, the universe is divided into 3 parts:

- Urdhva Loka – the realms of the gods or heavens
- Madhya Loka – the realms of the humans, animals and plants
- Adho Loka – the realms of the hellish beings or the infernal regions

== See also ==
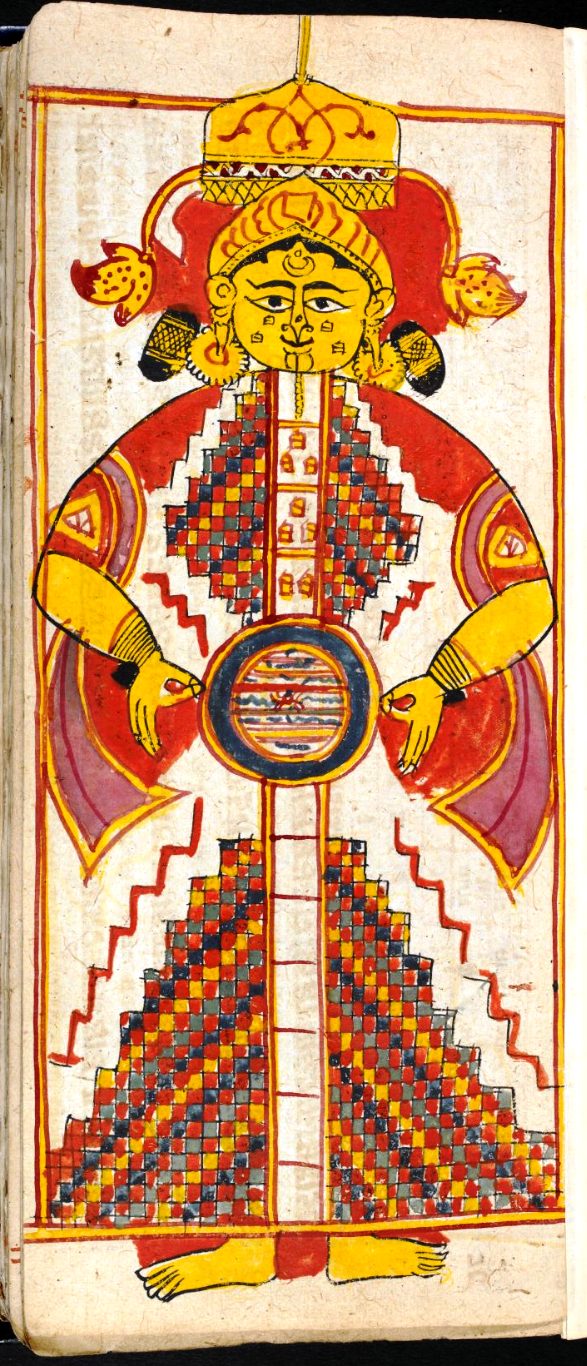
Fourteen Rajaloka or Triloka depicted as cosmic man. Miniature from 17th century, Saṁgrahaṇīratna by Śrīcandra, in Prakrit with a Gujarati commentary. Jain Śvetāmbara cosmological text with commentary and illustrations.

- Loka
- Six Paths
- Svarga
- Trikaya
- Sahā

== Sources ==
- Berzin, Alexander (6 March 2008). Berzin Archives Glossary. Retrieved Sunday 13 July 2008 from "Berzin Archives" at http://www.berzinarchives.com/web/en/about/glossary/glossary_tibetan.html.
- Fischer-Schreiber, Ingrid, Franz-Karl Ehrhard, Michael S. Diener and Michael H. Kohn (trans.) (1991). The Shambhala Dictionary of Buddhism and Zen. Boston: Shambhala Publications. ISBN 0-87773-520-4.
- Monier-Williams, Monier (1899, 1964). A Sanskrit-English Dictionary. London: Oxford University Press. ISBN 0-19-864308-X. Retrieved 2008-07-13 from "Cologne University" at https://www.sanskrit-lexicon.uni-koeln.de/scans/MWScan/index.php?sfx=pdf.
- Rhys Davids, T.W. & William Stede (eds.) (1921-5). The Pali Text Society’s Pali–English Dictionary. Chipstead: Pali Text Society. Retrieved 2008-07-13 from "U. Chicago" at http://dsal.uchicago.edu/dictionaries/pali/.
- W. E. Soothill & L. Hodous (1937-2000). A Dictionary of Chinese Buddhist Terms. Delhi: Motilal Banarsidass. ISBN 81-208-0319-1.
- Grimes, John A. (1996), A Concise Dictionary of Indian Philosophy: Sanskrit Terms Defined in English, SUNY Press, ISBN 9780791430675
- Titze, Kurt; Bruhn, Klaus (1998), Jainism: A Pictorial Guide to the Religion of Non-violence, Motilal Banarsidass Publication, ISBN 9788120815346
- Wiley, Kristi L. (2009), The A to Z of Jainism, Scarecrow Press, ISBN 9780810868212
- Raval, Mukundchandra G. (2016), Meru: The Center of our Earth, Notion Press, ISBN 9781945400100
