= Mātali =

Charioteer of Indra in Hinduism

Matali
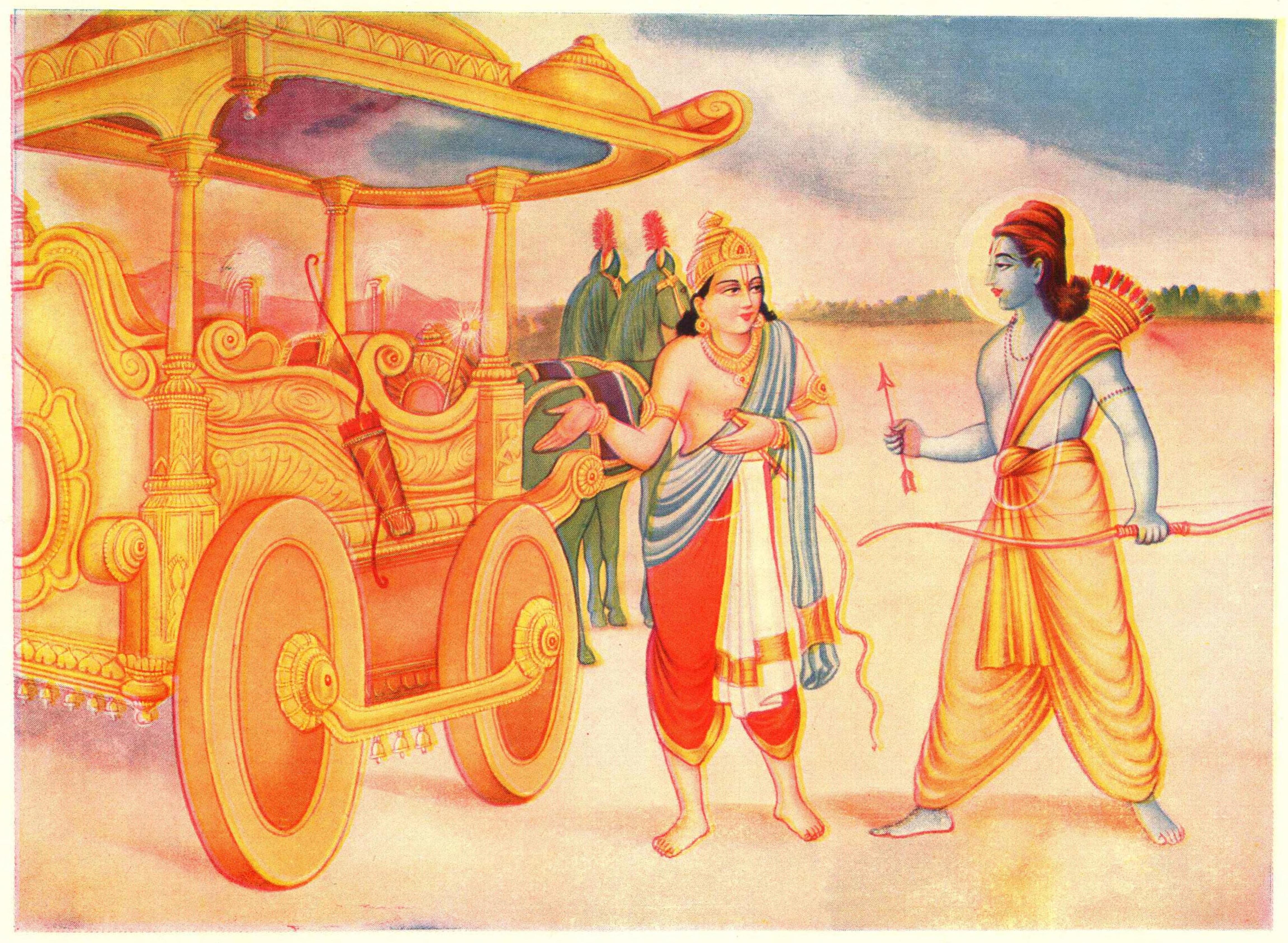
- Matali offers Indra's chariot to Rama.
- Abode: Svarga
- Texts: Puranas, Ramayana, Mahabharata
- Parents: Shamika (father), Tapasvini (mother)

Matali (Sanskrit: मातलि, romanized: Mātali) is the charioteer of Indra, the king of the devas, in Hinduism. He also acts as the messenger of Indra, inviting Dushyanta to help the deity in his war against the asuras in the Abhijnanashakuntalam. In the Padma Purana, Matali engages in a philosophical discourse with King Yayati regarding the nature of the soul, old age, and other concepts.

== Hindu mythology ==
=== Birth ===
The Vamana Purana offers a legend regarding the birth of Matali. A son was once born to the sage Shamika and his wife, Tapasvini. During the great Devasura war between Indra and Andhaka, Indra's celestial thunderbolt is described to have broken, and upon the counsel of Vishnu, the king of the devas propitiated Agni to gain a new divine weapon. He employed this weapon against the asuras, and the earth shivered due to the din of his golden chariot. Tapasvini had once been told that her child would become two if he were to be placed in an open ground at the time of an earthquake. Since she desired another child, she told Shamika to place their son upon the earth outside his hermitage. As foretold, another child, identical to the first child in every way, appeared at the side of the former. As soon as he was born, he immediately flew towards Indra. He was blessed by the gandharvas as he met the deity, and told him that he would be his charioteer. Indra enquired regarding the child's identity, and he told him that he was the son of Shamika, and was competent to drive the former's chariot as he had been blessed by the gandharvas. Indra accepted the child for the role he sought, and named him Matali.

=== Battle against Bali ===
In the devas' battle against Bali, featured in the Bhagavata Purana, an asura named Jambha attacked Matali with his burning javelin when the latter rescued Indra. Matali endured an extreme level of pain, and this caused the enraged Indra to employ his thunderbolt against the asura, beheading him.

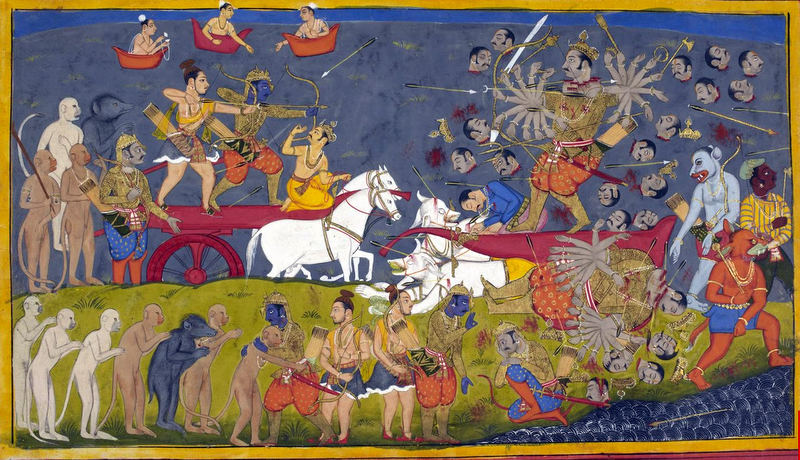
Matali counsels Rama in his battle against Ravana.

=== Battle of Lanka ===
In the Ramayana, Indra sent his own charioteer, Matali, to lend his assistance to Rama, due to the fact that the prince fought afoot against Ravana, who rode upon a chariot. Matali descended upon the earth and offered his obeisance to Rama, stating that he had been sent by Indra. He offered the prince the deity's own vimana, great bow, arrows, shield, and spear to help him triumph over the rakshasa.

=== Charioteer of Arjuna ===
In the Mahabharata, Matali appeared before Arjuna, informing him that his father, Indra, wished to see him at his own celestial abode. He drove Arjuna to Svarga, patiently answering the prince's various questions regarding the presence of great personages during their journey upon the chariot. Matali escorted the prince all the way to Indra's capital, Amaravati.

Matali drives Arjuna as he fights against a Nivatakavacha.

Matali also served as the charioteer of Arjuna when he battled the nivatakavachas, as instructed by his father. His counsel to the prince during this conflict proved to be crucial in securing victory against his foes.

== Other religious traditions ==
=== Buddhism ===
Mātali is the charioteer (sāyāhaka) of Sakka, the king of the gods in Buddhist cosmology. In Buddhist texts, Mātali serves not only as Sakka's charioteer but also as his close companion and confidant, often accompanying him on various divine and earthly missions.

In the current age, Mātali is described as having a son named Sikhaṇḍī, who was initially loved by Bhaddā Suriyavaccasā, the daughter of the Gandhabba king Timbarū. However, her affections later shifted to Pañcasikha. (DN II.268).

Mātali plays a significant role in numerous canonical texts. He is present during Sakka's battles against the asuras, including the episode where he drives Sakka's chariot—known as the Vejayanta Ratha—drawn by a thousand Sindh horses when Sakka flees with his bride Sujātā (Dhammapada Aṭṭhakathā I.279f; Jātaka I.202f).

Mātali frequently appears in the human world alongside Sakka, often in disguise. Examples include his appearances as a fish in the Culladhanuggaha Jātaka, a brahmin in both the Bilārakosiya Jātaka and the Suddhābhojana Jātaka, and a black dog in the Mahākanha Jātaka. On several occasions, Sakka dispatches Mātali to escort mortals to the Tāvatiṃsa heaven, including figures such as Guttila, Nimi, Makhādeva, and Sādhīna. During these journeys, Mātali acts as a knowledgeable guide, pointing out places of interest along the way.

Following the Buddha's descent from Tāvatiṃsa after delivering the Abhidhamma teachings, Mātali is said to have accompanied him, standing on the Buddha's left side while offering divine scents, garlands, and flowers (DhA III.226). In both the Bilārakosiya and Suddhābhojana Jātakas, Mātali is identified as the son of Suriya.

According to the Jātaka commentaries, Ānanda was reborn as Mātali in several previous lives (Jātaka I.206; IV.180; V.412; VI.129), as was Mahā Kassapa (Jātaka IV.69).

In the Mahāsamaya Sutta (DN II.258), Mātali is mentioned as a chief of the Gandhabbas, while in the Āṭānāṭiya Sutta (DN III.204), he is listed among the prominent Yakkhas invoked for protection by the followers of the Buddha.

=== Jainism ===
Ācārya Hemacandra's 12th-century Triṣaṣṭiśalākāpuruṣacarita (The Lives of the Sixty-Three Illustrious Men), interprets Mātali as the charioteer who served Krishna in battle.

His inclusion highlights the Jain principle of guidance and support, emphasizing the importance of wise counsel in navigating spiritual challenges.
