= Nivatakavacha =

Race of daityas in Hinduism

Arjuna fights a nivatakavacha, driven by Matali. Balinese art.

The nivatakavachas (Sanskrit: निवातकवच, romanized: Nivātakavaca, lit. 'the impenetrable armoured ones') are a sect of daityas, the children of Kashyapa and Diti, classified under the race of asuras in Hindu mythology. They are best known for their battles against Ravana and Arjuna, the latter of which caused their annihilation.

Thirty million nivatakavachas were born in the daitya clan. Allied with the kalakeyas, they triumphed over the devas in battle. They are described to have been skilled in magic and warfare, wielding powerful weapons to defeat their foes.

== Literature ==
=== Ramayana ===
The nivatakavachas are said to have terrorised the world, living deep beneath the ocean, and residing in the city of Maṇimatī after securing boons from Brahma. In the Ramayana, Ravaṇa with his sons Meghanada, Atikaya, and with his army attacked these daityas, but though he defeated the sect, due to Brahma's boon, he was unable to kill them. The two sides finally formed an alliance after Brahma intervened.

=== Mahabharata ===
In the Mahabharata, Indra sought the destruction of the nivatakavachas from his son, Arjuna, as his dakshina (honorarium). Describing the sect as his foes, he stated that the nivatakavachas lived in a fortress under the ocean, numbered thirty million, and were alike in shape, size, and prowess. To achieve this task, Indra sent his own charioteer, Matali, to drive Arjuna to the location of his foes. The devas offered Arjuna a conch named Devadatta, and Matali offered him ornaments that resembled his own. When the two reached the city of the daityas, they closed their gates, fearing that Indra himself had appeared to slay them. When Arjuna blew his conch, the nivatakavachas attacked him, loosing tridents, spears, and arrows upon him. Arjuna released arrows from his Gandiva, slaying the daityas in the thousands. The nivatakavachas rendered themselves invisible, and showered elemental attacks on Arjuna. The prince grew disheartened when he realised that he was unable to manoeuvre their attacks due to the intensity of their barrage. Matali urged him to employ the thunderbolt missiles he had brought with him, which devastated the daityas, and defeated them. The daitya women sought shelter in their houses as Arjuna entered Maṇimatī, thinking that it looked better than the city of the devas. The charioteer explained that the city had previously belonged to the devas, but had been captured by the daityas following a boon granted to them by Brahma. Brahma assured Indra that the latter himself, in another form, would defeat the daityas, which had just transpired. He encouraged Arjuna to also lay waste to Hiranyapura, a neighbouring city of the danavas who opposed his father as well, which the prince achieved.

=== Javanese Ramayana ===
The Javanese Kakawin Ramayana has an episode named Arjunawiwaha (the marriage of Arjuna), which is set up on the incidents that take place surrounding Arjuna's exploits of the nivatakavachas. The city of the danavas in this poem is known as Manimantaka. Apart from the protagonist Arjuna, other main characters of the poem include Sakra, the king of the devas, and Suprabha, a celestial nymph who helps Arjuna on his mission.

== See also ==
- Asuras
- Daityas
- Danavas
- Kalakeyas
- List of Asuras
