= Patala =

Underworld in Indian religions

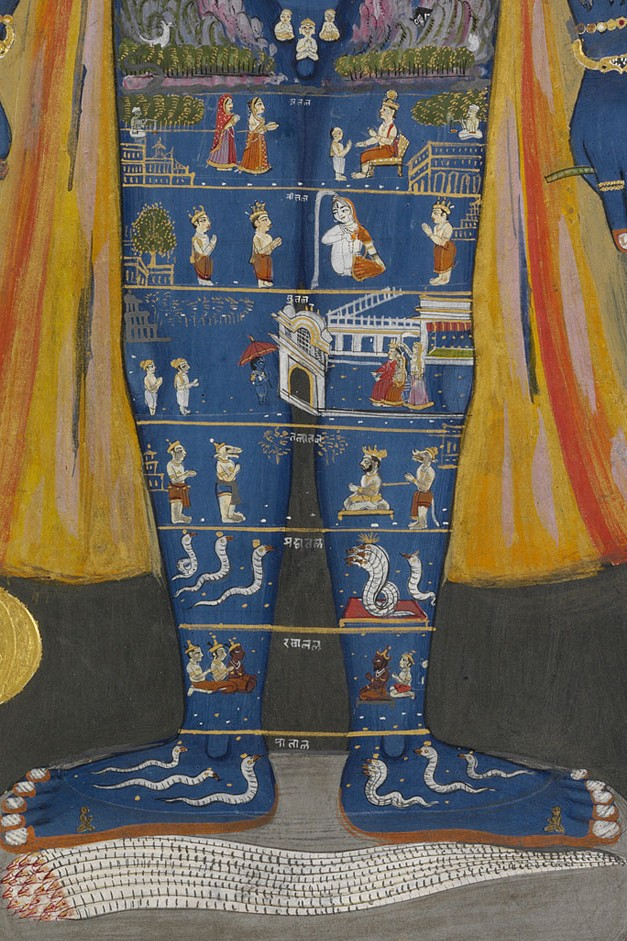
The legs of the god Vishnu as the purusha depict earth and the six realms of Patala. The feet rest on Shesha.

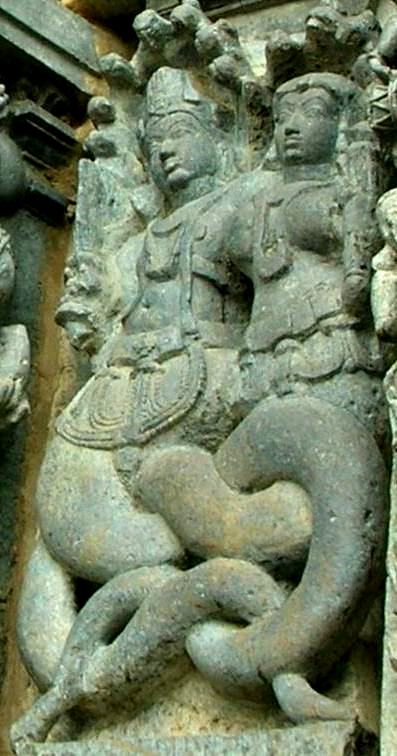
Nagas are believed to live in the lowest realm of Patala, called Naga-loka.

In Indian religions, Patala (Sanskrit: पाताल, IAST: pātāla, lit. that which is below the feet), denotes the subterranean realms of the universe – which are located under the earthly dimension. Patala is often translated as underworld or netherworld. Patala is described as more beautiful than Svarga (subtle dimensions, loosely translated as heaven). Patala is described as filled with splendid jewels, beautiful groves and lakes.

In Vajrayana Buddhism, caves inhabited by asuras are entrances to Patala; these asuras, particularly female asuras, are often "tamed" (converted to Buddhism) as dharmapala or dakinis by famous Buddhist figures such as Padmasambhava.

In Hindu cosmology, the universe is divided into the three worlds: Svarga, Bhumi or Martya (earth/mortal plane) and Patala (gross dimensions, the underworld). Patala is composed of seven realms/dimensions or lokas, the seventh and lowest of them is also called Patala or Nāga-loka, the region of the Nagas. The Danavas (children of Danu), Daityas (children of Diti), Rakshas and the snake-people Nagas (serpent-human formed sons of Kadru), live in the realms of Patala.

== Hinduism ==
The Vishnu Purana tells of a visit by the divine wandering sage Narada to Patala. Narada describes Patala as more beautiful than Svarga. Patala is described as filled with splendid jewels, beautiful groves and lakes and lovely asura maidens. Sweet fragrance is in the air and is fused with sweet music. The soil here is white, black, purple, sandy, yellow, stony and also of gold.

The Bhagavata Purana calls the seven lower regions bila-svargas ("subterranean heavens") and they are regarded as planets or planetary systems below the earth. These regions are described as being more opulent than the upper heavenly regions of the universe. The life here is of pleasure, wealth and luxury, with no distress. The asura architect Maya has constructed palaces, temples, houses, yards and hotels for foreigners, with jewels. The natural beauty of Patala is said to surpass that of Svarga. There is no sunlight in the lower realms, but the darkness is dissipated by the shining of the jewels that the residents of Patala wear. There is no old age, no sweat, no disease in Patala.

The Vishnu Purana, states the seven realms of Patala, which are located one above the other, are seventy thousand yojanas (a unit of measurement) below the Earth's surface. Each of them extends ten thousand Yojanas. In Vishnu Purana, they are named as from the highest to the lowest as: Atala, Vitala, Nitala, Garbhastimat, Mahatala, Sutala and Patala. In the Bhagavata Purana and the Padma Purana, they are called Atala, Vitala, Sutala, Talatala, Mahatala, Rasatala and Patala. The Shiva Purana, replaces Mahatala with Tala. The Vayu Purana calls them Rasatala, Sutala, Vitala, Gabhastala, Mahatala, Sritala and Patala. The seven Patalas as well as the earth above them is supported on the head of the tamasic (dark) form of Vishnu, the thousand-headed nāga Shesha. Sometimes, Shesha is described as residing in the lowest region of Patala instead of below it. Below the regions of Patala lies Naraka, the Hindu Hell – the realm of death where sinners are punished.

Different realms of Patala are ruled by different asura and Nagas; usually with the Nagas headed by Vasuki assigned to the lowest realm. Vayu Purana records each realm of Patala has cities in it. The first region has the cities of the daitya Namuchi and Naga Kaliya; in the second Hayagriva and Naga Takshaka; in the third, those of Prahlada and Hemaka; in the fourth of Kalanemi and Vainateya; in the fifth of Hiranyaksha and Kirmira and in the sixth, of Puloman and Vasuki. Bali rules as the sovereign king of Patala.

The Bhagavata Purana presents a detailed description of the seven lower realms. A similar description of the seven Patalas also appears in the Devi-Bhagavata Purana.

=== Atala ===
Atala is ruled by Bala – a son of Maya – who possesses mystical powers. By one yawn, Bala created three types of women – svairiṇīs ("self-willed"), who like to marry men from their own group; kāmiṇīs ("lustful"), who marry men from any group, and the punshchalīs ("those who wholly give themselves up"), who keep changing their partners. When a man enters Atala, these women enchant him and serve him an intoxicating cannabis drink that induces sexual energy in the man. Then, these women enjoy sexual play with the traveller, who feels to be stronger than ten thousand elephants and forgets impending death.

=== Vitala ===
Vitala is ruled by the god Hara-Bhava (possibly a form of Shiva), who dwells with attendant ganas including ghosts and goblins as the master of gold mines along with his consort Bhavani, as the progenitor of living beings and their sexual fluids flow as river Hataki here. When fire – fanned by wind – drinks from this river, it spits the water out as a type of gold called Hataka. The residents of this realm are adorned with gold from this region.

=== Sutala ===
Sutala constructed by Vishvakarma, is the kingdom of the pious asura king Bali. The dwarf avatar of Vishnu, Vamana, requested three paces of land, acquired the three worlds in his three paces, and sent Bali – who had conquered the three worlds – to Sutala, but when Bali surrendered to Vishnu and gave him all of his belongings, Vishnu made him richer than Indra, the deva-king of heaven. Highly impressed by the Bali's devotion, Vishnu gave him a boon that he himself would perpetually stand as the watchman to Bali's palace. Bali still prays to Vishnu in this realm.

=== Talātala ===
Talātala is the realm of the asura-architect Maya, who is well-versed in sorcery. Shiva, as Tripurantaka, destroyed the three cities of Maya, but was later pleased with Maya and gave him this realm and promised to protect him.

=== Mahātala ===
Mahātala is the abode of many-hooded Nagas (serpents) – the sons of Kadru, headed by the Krodhavasha (Irascible) band of Kuhaka, Takshaka, Kaliya and Sushena. They live here with their families in peace but always fear Garuda.

=== Rasātala ===
Rasātala at the sole of the feet of the universe form of Vishnu is the home of the Asuras – Danavas and Daityas, who are mighty but cruel. They are the eternal foes of Devas (the gods). They live in holes like serpents.

=== Patala ===
Patala or Nagaloka is the lowest realm and the region of the Nagas, ruled by Vasuki (the snake that hangs around Shiva's neck). Here live several Nagas with many hoods. Each of their hoods is decorated by a jewel, a source of light of which illuminates this realm.

== Buddhism ==
In early Vajrayana, Patala (Tibetan: sa 'og ས་འོག་ "the Underground") is understood as a grouping of underground paradises inhabited by nāgas and asuras above the Naraka realm. While the story of the establishment of Patala as an asura realm is attributed to the defeat of the asuras on Mount Meru, in Buddhist scriptures this is due to their defeat by Śakra using a mantra of Mañjuśrī instead of by their defeat by Vishnu; this is the explanation given for the appearance of Śakra wielding the banner of Mañjuśrī in iconic imagery.

Patala is associated with the Kriyātantras, which are associated with the kīla, the phenomenon of the tertön and terma and water magic and with the attainment of vidyādhara (Chinese: 仙, 仚; pinyin: xiān) status. These practices have been largely ignored after the early period of Tibetan Buddhism and Tangmi but originally were popular.

The importance of Patala to esoteric Buddhism lay in its role as the source of alchemy and magical science or vidyā, immortality and enjoyment, particularly the opportunity for the (male) vidyādhara to have intercourse with female non-humans. It was also viewed as a source of flowing waters.

== See also ==
- Hindu cosmology
- Trailokya
- Urdhva lokas

== Bibliography ==
- Dimmitt, Cornelia (2012). Classical Hindu Mythology: A Reader in the Sanskrit Puranas. Temple University Press. ISBN 978-1-4399-0464-0.
- Māṇi, Veṭṭaṃ (1975). Puranic Encyclopaedia: A Comprehensive Dictionary With Special Reference to the Epic and Puranic Literature. Delhi: Motilal Banarsidass. ISBN 0-8426-0822-2.
- Māṇi, Veṭṭaṃ (1998). Purāṇic Encyclopaedia: A Comprehensive Dictionary with Special Reference to the Epic and Purāṇic Literature. Motilal Banarsidass. ISBN 978-81-208-0597-2.
- Mayer, Robert (2007). "The Importance of the Underworlds: Asuras' Caves in Buddhism, and Some Other Themes in Early Buddhist Tantras Reminiscent of the Later Padmasambhava Legends". Journal of the International Association of Tibetan Studies. 3.
- Parmeshwaranand (2001). Encyclopaedic Dictionary of Puranas. Sarup & Sons. ISBN 978-81-7625-226-3.
- Wilson, Horace Hayman (1865). "Chapter V". The Vishnu Purana (Translation). London: Trübner & Co. pp. 209–213.
