= Amaravati (mythology) =

Abode of Indra in Hinduism

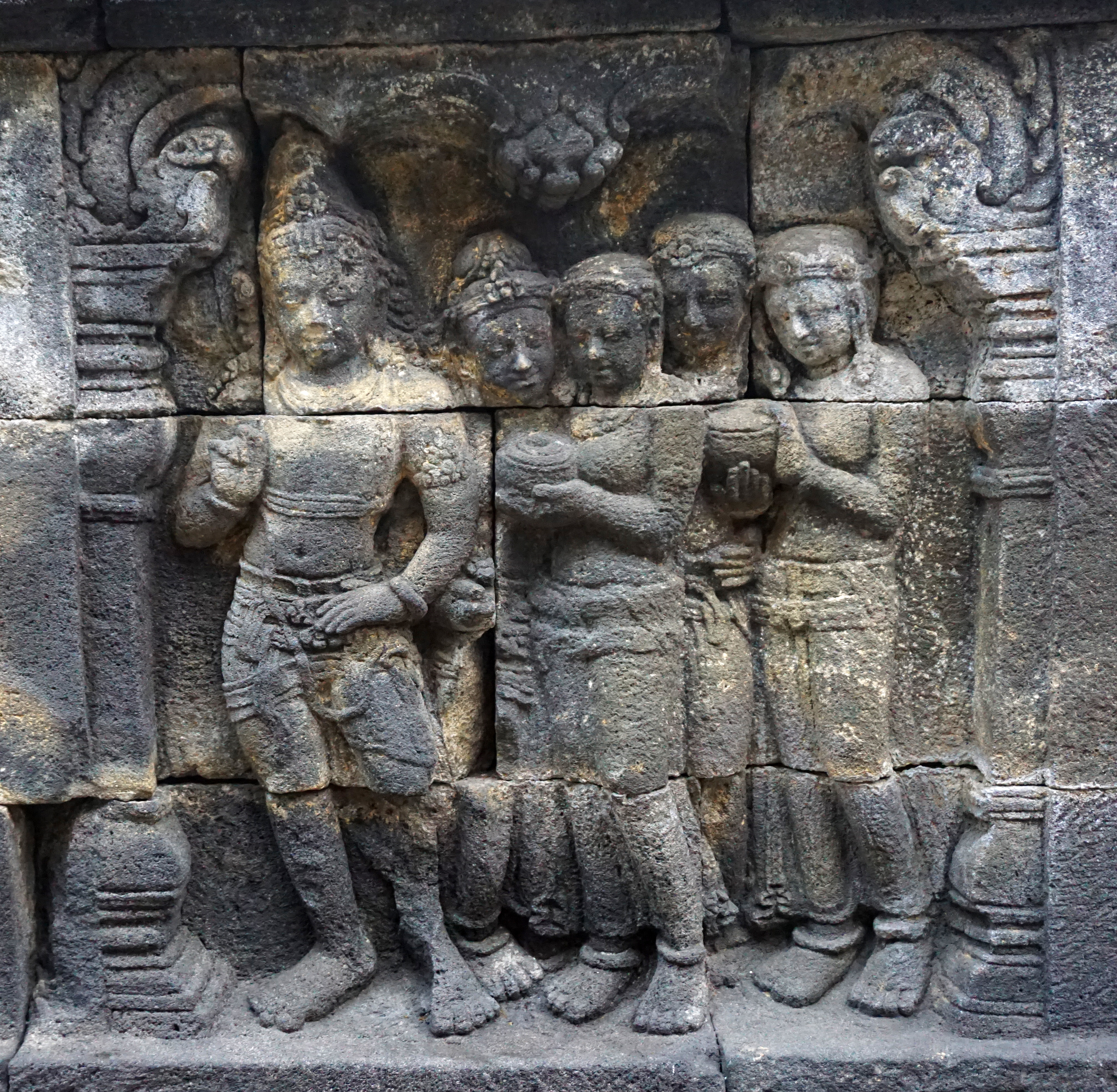
Sculpture of Indra and his attendants, Borobudur temple.

Amaravati (Sanskrit: अमरावती, lit. 'city of the immortals' IAST: Amarāvatī) is the capital city of Svarga, the realm of Indra, the king of the devas, in Hinduism, Buddhism, and Jainism. It is also called Devapura, ‘city of the devas’ and Pūṣābhāsā, ‘sun-splendour’ in the Puranas.

== Description ==
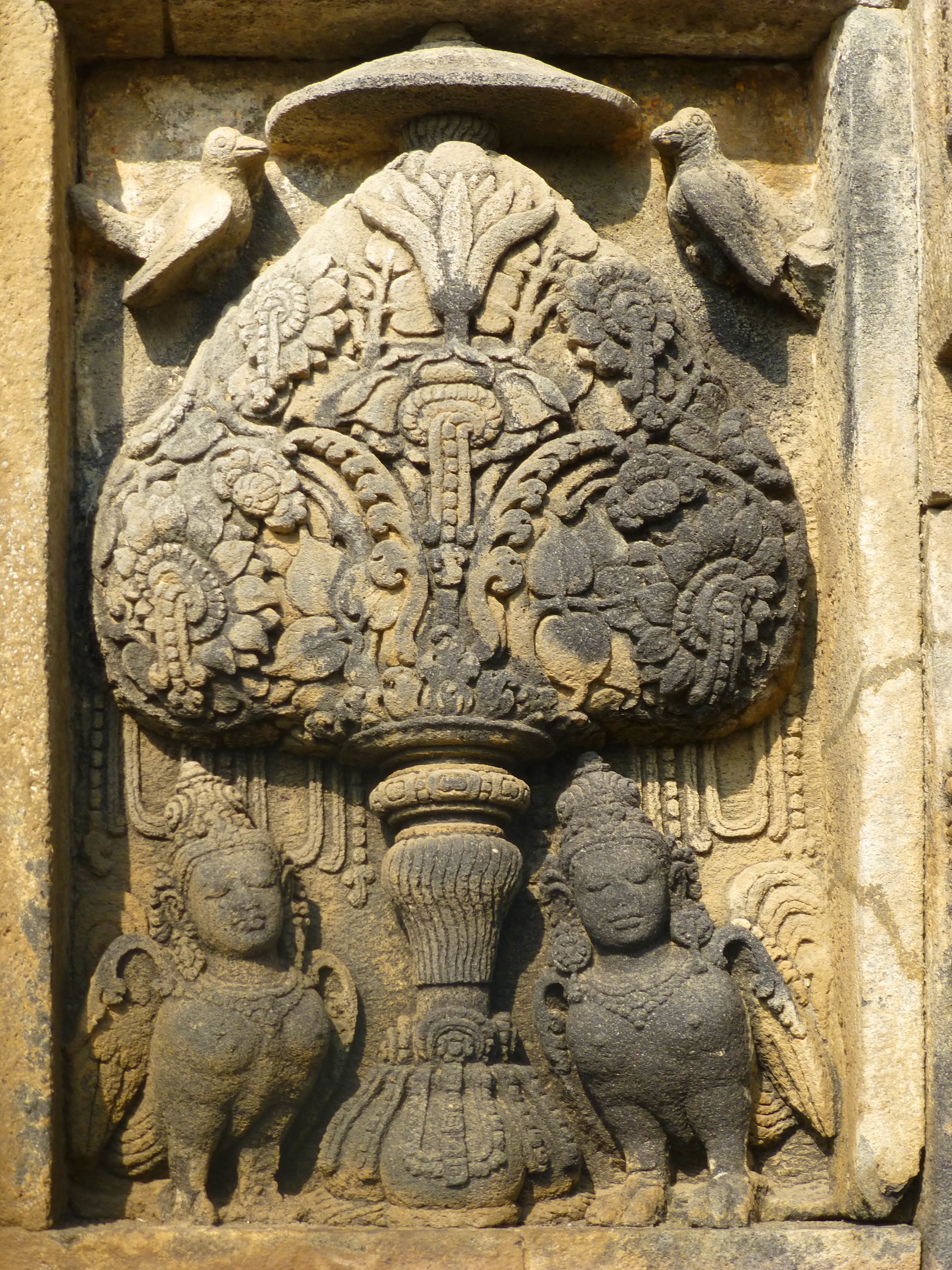
Sculpture of Kalpavriksha and kinnaras, Java.

In Hindu tradition, Amaravati was built by Vishvakarma, the architect of the devas, a son of Brahma, but sometimes also depicted as a son of Kashyapa. At the centre of Amaravati is Vaijayanta, the palace of Indra, or Śakra (Buddhism) in Buddhism. The heaven of Indra is a region for the virtuous alone, with celestial gardens called Nandana Vana, that houses sacred trees, like the wish-fulfilling Kalpavriksha, as well as sweet-scented flowers such as hibiscuses, roses, hyacinths, freesias, magnolias, gardenias, jasmines, and honeysuckles. Fragrant almond extract is sprinkled on the sides of palaces. The fragrant groves are occupied by apsaras. Low sweet music is stated to play in this land. Indra's abode is eight hundred miles in circumference and forty miles in height.

The denizens of Amaravati include the devas, danavas, gandharvas, kinnaras, uragas, and rakshasas, as well as fortunate human beings who are on par with the devas in this realm.

The pillars of Amaravati are composed of diamonds, and its furniture is made of pure gold. Amaravati's palaces are also made of gold. Pleasant breezes are described to carry the perfume of rose-coloured flowers. The inhabitants of Amaravati are entertained by music, dancing, and every sort of festivity. Divinity is stated to fill up the entire region. The audience chamber of Amaravati accommodates the thirty-three celestials called the Trāyastriṃśa, together with the forty-eight thousand rishis, and a multitude of attendants. In the Mahabharata, Indra has another celestial meeting hall at Amaravati, known as Pushkara-Malini, which he is described to have built himself.

== Literature ==
=== Skanda Purana ===
In the Skanda Purana, the environs of the city are described:

The heavenly garden Nandana was present there in the excellent Mahākālavana. Kāmadhenu was known and reputed to be the bestower of desired boons. She always served Mahākāla Maheśvara there. The excellent tree Pārijāta (served him). Bindusaras with never-fading lotuses, is said to be the excellent Mānasa lake. It is full of swans and Sārasa birds. It is resorted to by Suras and Siddhas. Pearls and jewels are scattered everywhere and splendid Ratnas made it shine. This Nidhi (treasure of Mahāpadma) shone with Kalhāra and Kumuda. Whatever divine things are present in the cosmos are present in the splendid Mahākālavana.

— Skanda Purana, Chapter 46

=== Brahma Purana ===
In the Brahma Purana, the city of Dvaraka built by Krishna is stated to describe Amaravati, consisting of grand parks and outer walls, boasting hundreds of lakes, as well as hundreds of thick ramparts.

== See also ==
- Svarga
- Devaloka
- Vaikuntha
- Satyaloka
- Kailasa
