= Loka =

Concept of world in Indian religions

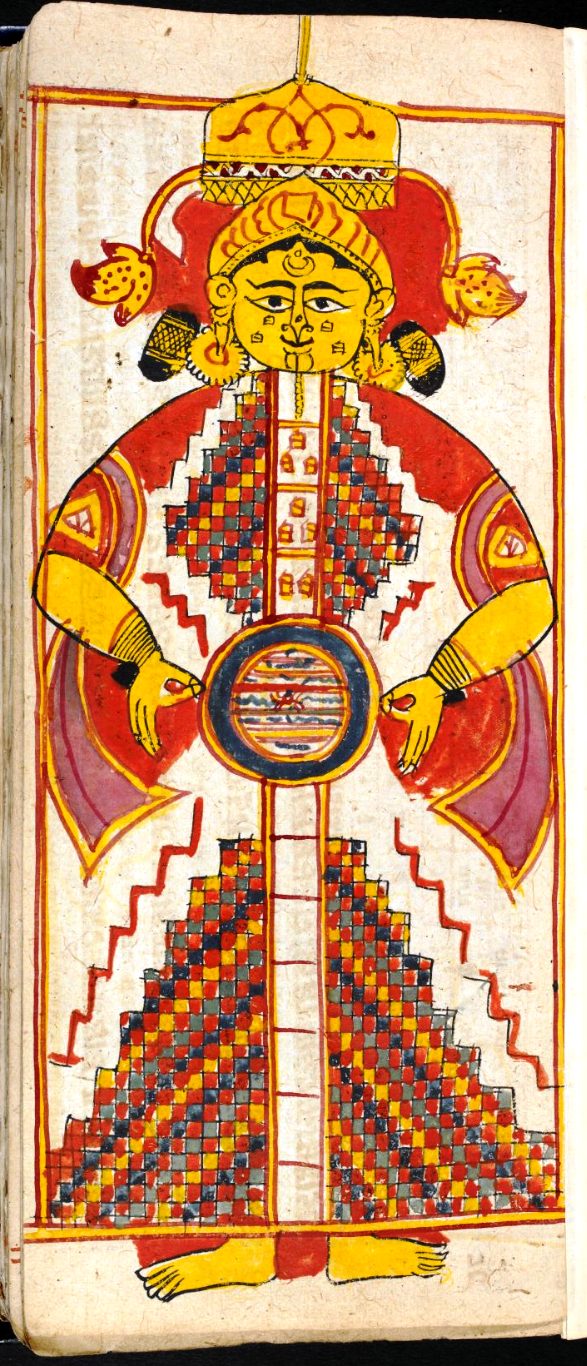
Rajaloka, Saṁgrahaṇīratna by Śrīcandra, 17th century.

Loka (Sanskrit: लोक) is a concept in Hinduism and other Indian religions, that may be translated as a planet, the universe, a plane, or a realm of existence. In some philosophies, it may also be interpreted as a mental state that one can experience. A primary concept in several Indian religions is the idea that different lokas are home to various divine beings, and one takes birth in such realms based on their karma.

== Etymology ==
The term loka is derived from the Sanskrit verbal root lok, which means "to see", "to perceive", or "to look". In scriptural explanations, a loka is understood as a realm of experience.

== Hinduism ==
=== Three lokas ===
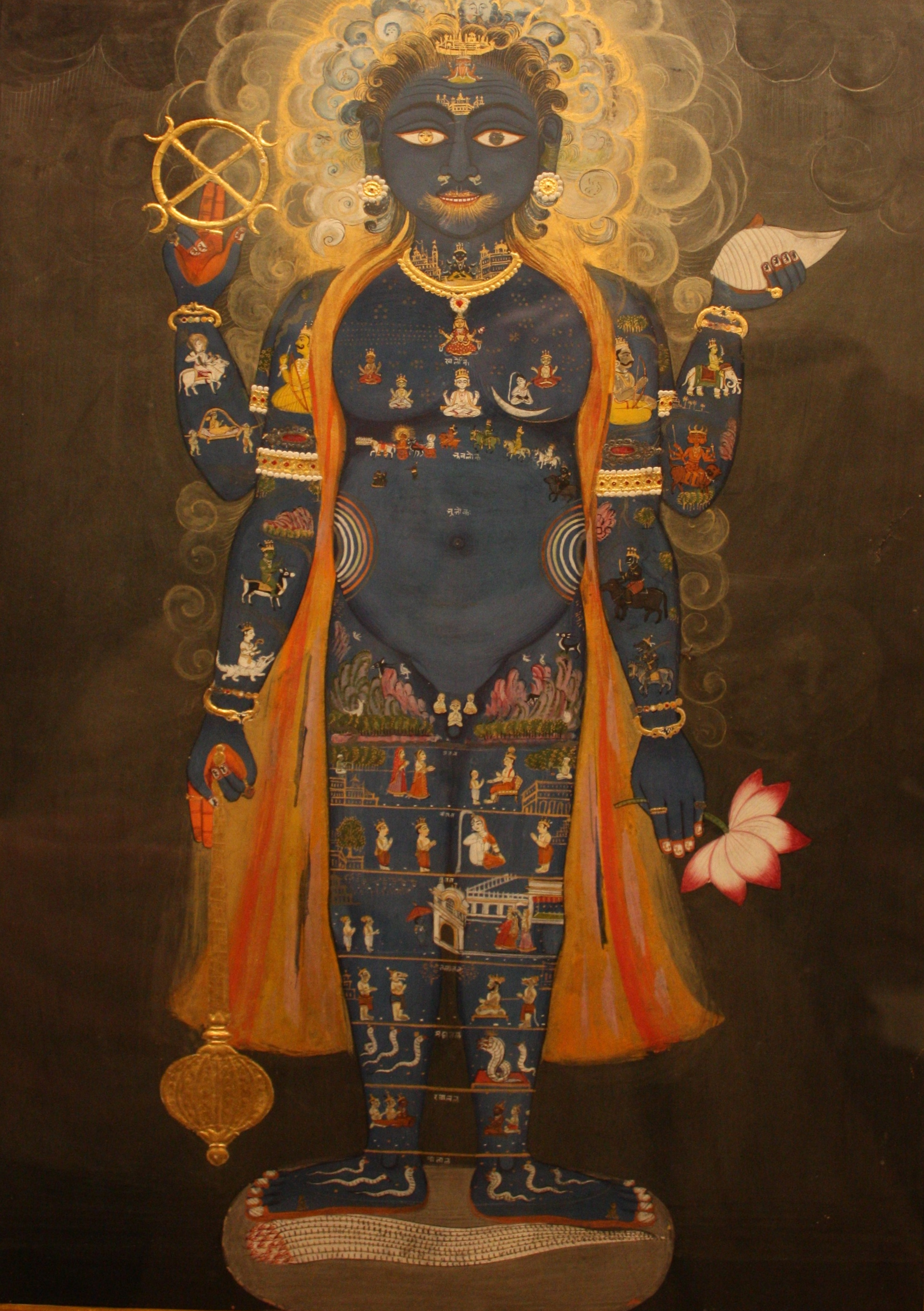
Vishvarupa of Vishnu as the Cosmic Man with the three realms: heaven - Satya to Bhuvar loka (head to belly), earth - Bhu loka (groin), underworld - Atala to Patala loka (legs).

A foundational arrangement of the lokas in Hinduism appear in the Vedic scriptures as trailokya or triloka, or the three realms (or worlds). The three worlds refer to: Bhurloka (Earth), Svarga (heaven), and Naraka or Patala (hell or the underworld).

==== Bhurloka ====
In the Narada Purana, Bhurloka is identified with the planet Earth, the world of human beings. It is described to be split up into seven regions, referred to as dvipas (islands). These regions are known as Jambudvipa, Plakshadvipa, Shalmaladvipa, Kushadvipa, Kraunchadvipa, Shakadvipa, and Pushkaradvipa. Of special significance is the Indian subcontinent, referred to as Bharatavarsha, which is a land where the fruits of one's actions allows one passage into either Svarga or Naraka. Bhurloka also has seven oceans, namely, Lavana, Ikshu, Sura, Sarpih, Dadhi, Dughdha, and Jala.

==== Svarga ====
Generally translated as heaven, Svarga is identified with the realm of Indra and the devas in contemporary Hinduism. The Vedas offer the reward of Svarga as one's destination for the proper practice of sacrificial rituals on earth. In Vedic mythology, Svarga is filled with the nectar of immortality, amrita, with lakes containing lotuses, pools of wine, milk, and ghee, as well as streams that are replete with honey. It is abundant with food and refreshments, and equal opportunity is offered to all of its denizens. It is described to be an infinite, complete, as well as an immortal realm, offering pleasure to those rare few who are able to ascend to it. It is sometimes associated with Pitṛloka, the realm of one's ancestors, but this association is not present in all literature.

==== Naraka ====
Naraka is generally translated as hell, and refers to the loka that humans are sent to, to be punished for their sins. Ruled by Yama, sinners are offered appropriate punishments for their sins on earth, and after a period of time, reborn on earth with bad vipāka, which is the effect of bad karma. The Bhagavata Purana enumerates the following 28 Narakas: Tamisra, Andhatamisra, Raurava, Maharaurava, Kumbhipaka, Kalasutra, Asipatravana, Sukaramukha, Andhakupa, Krimibhojana, Samdamsa, Taptasurmi, Vajrakantaka-salmali, Vaitarani, Puyoda, Pranarodha, Visasana, Lalabhaksa, Sarameyadana, Avichi, Ayahpana, Ksharakardama, Raksogana-bhojana, Sulaprota, Dandasuka, Avata-nirodhana, Paryavartana, and Suchimukha.

The Brahmanda Purana conceives them to be Bhūta (past), Bhavya (future), and Bhavat (present)

The scholar Deborah Soifer describes the development of the concept of lokas as follows:

The concept of a loka or lokas develops in the Vedic literature. Influenced by the special connotations that a word for space might have for a nomadic people, loka in the Veda did not simply mean place or world, but had a positive valuation: it was a place or position of religious or psychological interest with a special value or function of its own. Hence, inherent in the 'loka' concept in the earliest literature was a double aspect; that is, coexistent with spatiality was a religious or soteriological meaning, which could exist independent of a spatial notion, an 'immaterial' significance. The most common cosmological conception of lokas in the Veda was that of the trailokya or triple world: three worlds consisting of earth, atmosphere or sky, and heaven, making up the universe."

=== Fourteen lokas ===
Commentators during the classical Puranic period expanded the three realm model into a fourteen realm model, further subdivided into seven higher worlds (urdhva loka) and seven descending worlds (adholoka).

The seven upper realms, above earth, consist of Bhurloka, Bhuvarloka, Svarloka, Maharloka, Janaloka, Tapoloka, and Satyaloka. As the realms increase, they are characterized by purity and dissolution of materialistic attachments.

The lower realms, collectively known as patala (underworlds), are Atala, Vitala, Sutala, Talatala, Mahatala, Rasatala, and Patala. The underworlds can be considered as various hells.

In each of these realms are different deities and beings 'living out their karmic trajectories". Those beings in the higher realms have attained a temporary spiritual liberation due to their positive merits for having strengthened their detachment to the mind, ego and sense objects. However, ultimate liberation (moksha) is regarded as the highest goal in human life, in which one achieves ultimate union with God. Moksha, in turn, requires total detachment from worldly objects and desires.

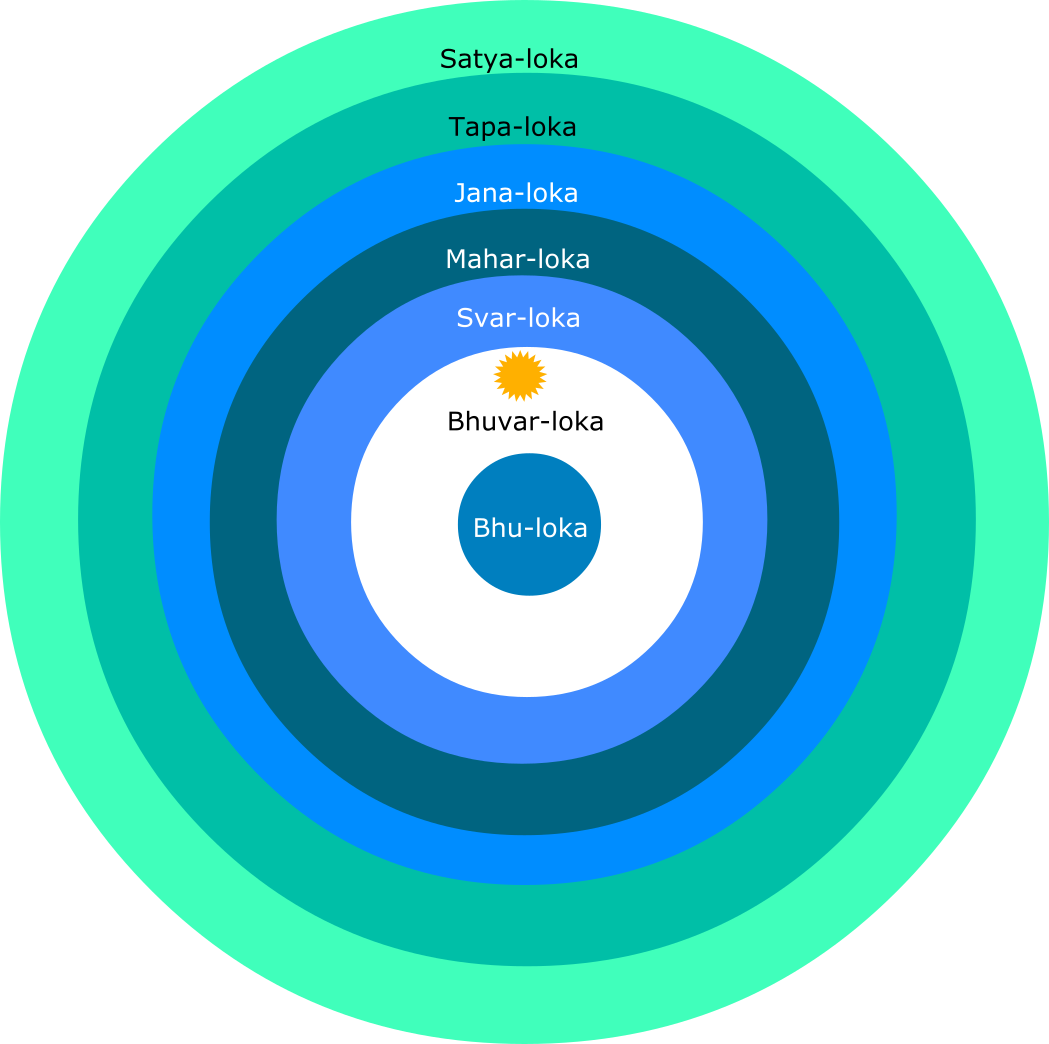
Higher seven Lokas

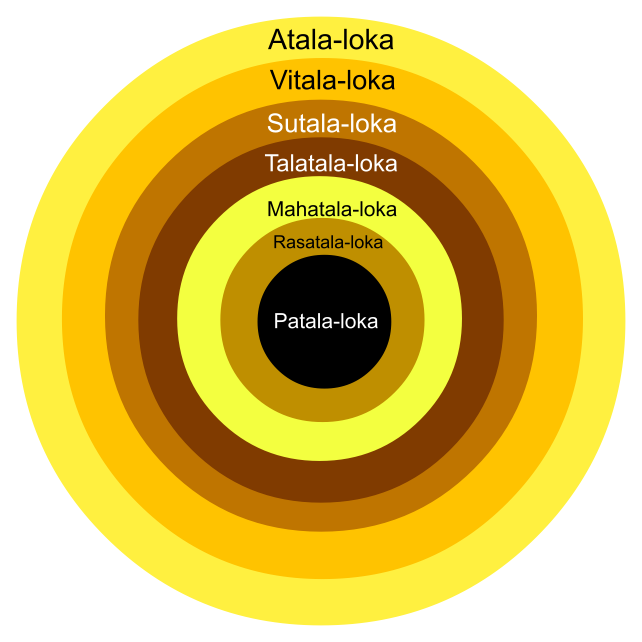
The lower seven Lokas

Lokas:

1. Satya-loka (Brahma-loka)
2. Tapa-loka
3. Jana-loka
4. Mahar-loka
5. Svar-loka (Svarga-loka)
6. Bhuvar-loka
7. Bhu-loka
8. Atala-loka
9. Vitala-loka
10. Sutala-loka
11. Talatala-loka
12. Mahatala-loka
13. Rasatala-loka
14. Patala-loka

Another lineup of the fourteen lokas is stated as follows:

1. Bhur-loka
2. Bhuvar-loka
3. Suvar-loka
4. Mahar-loka
5. Janar-loka
6. Tapar-loka
7. Satya-loka
8. Brahma-loka
9. Pitri-loka
10. Soma-loka
11. Indra-loka
12. Gandharva-loka
13. Rakshasa-loka
14. Yaksha-loka

== Buddhism ==
=== Six lokas ===
In the Tibetan and Tantric schools, "Six Lokas" refers to a Bönpo and Nyingmapa spiritual practice or discipline that works with chakras and the six dimensions or classes of beings in the Bhavachakra. In Buddhist cosmology, Kama-Loka, Rupa-Loka, Arupa-Loka are the realms that are inhabited by various beings. Additionally, those who inhabit these realms will identify with the characteristics of that realm. For example, a being that resides in Kama-loka experiences predominantly sensual desires, whereas a being in Rupa-loka will experience deep meditation. Various early suttas also suggest that there is a close relationship between psychology and cosmology, equating to different levels of existence in the cosmos, which can be interpreted as the afformentioned lokas.

=== Three lokas ===
There is a cosmological view in Buddhism called Trailokya. In early Buddhism, based upon the Pali Canon and related Agamas, there are three distinct realms: First the Kama Loka, or the world of sensuality, in which humans, animals, and some devas reside, the second is Rupadhatu Loka, or the world of material existence, in which certain beings mastering specific meditative attainments reside, and the third is Arupadhatu Loka, or the immaterial, formless world, in which formless spirits reside. Arahants, who have attained the highest goal of Nirvana have unbound themselves from individual existence in any form, in any realm, and cannot be found here, there, or in between, i.e., they are found in no loka whatsoever. The early suttas also contain information regarding another important domain known as the supramundane realm, (lokottara/lokuttara 出世間, “beyond the world”), which is described as being experienced by awakened noble beings.

== Jainism ==
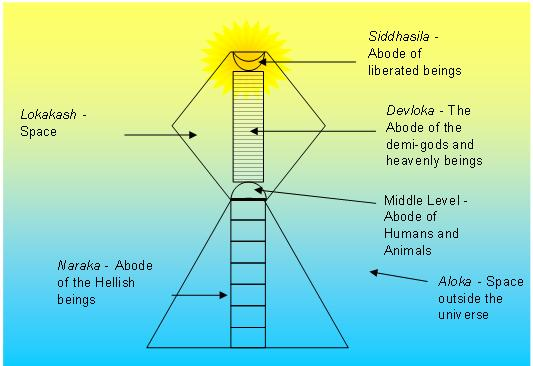
Universe structure as told by Kevalins

In Jain texts, the universe is referred to as loka. Although loka originally means "open space," Jain teachers preferred to derive it from the verbal root lok, which means to see. They explain loka as "that which is seen by the omniscient ones."

Jain cosmology postulates an eternal and ever-existing loka which works on universal natural laws, there being no creator and destroyer deity. According to the Jain cosmology, the universe is divided into three parts:

1. Urdhva Loka - the realms of the gods or heavens
2. Madhya Loka – the realms of the humans, animals and plants
3. Adho Loka – the realms of the hellish beings or the infernal regions

Jain cosmology uses the terms loka and aloka to describe the inhabitable and uninhabitable spaces in the universe. The philosophy describes how inhabitable space (loka) will never penetrate into the uninhabitable space (aloka) and vice versa, both of which are a subdivision of space (ākāśa). In the aloka, there is nothing except strong winds. In Jain cosmology, on achieving moksha, the soul becomes free of the wordly realm once the fruits of all good and bad karmas have been received.
