= Urdhva lokas =

Upper worlds or realms in Hindu Cosmology

In Hindu cosmology, Urdhvaloka (Sanskrit: ऊर्ध्वलोक, romanized: Ūrdhvaloka), or upper spheres of the world, refer to seven ascending realms (or lokas) of existence. Thes seven realms: Bhurloka, Bhuvarloka, Svarloka, Maharloka, Janaloka, Tapoloka, and Satyaloka represent the upper half of the fourteen realm system described in Puranic literature, such as the Vishnu Purana and Brahmanda Purana.

== Etymology ==
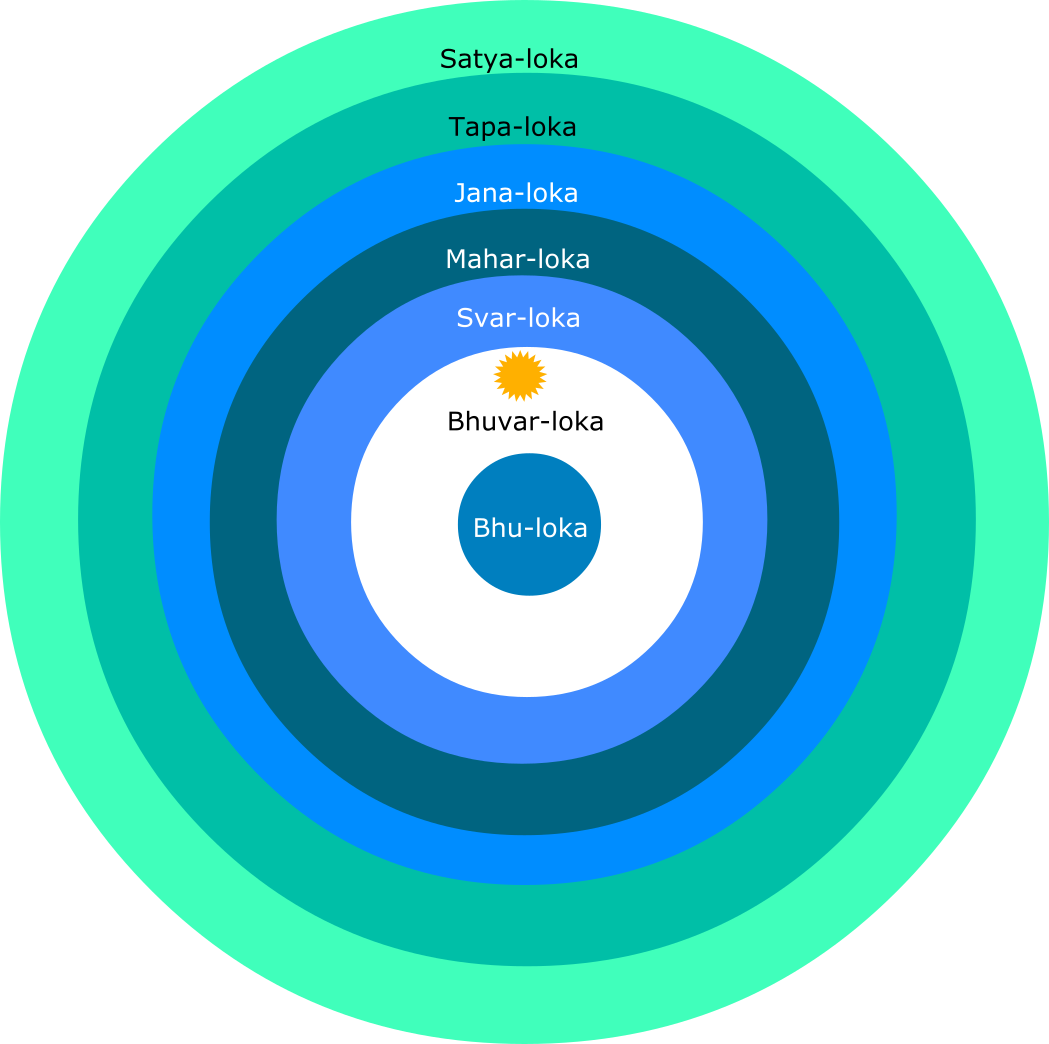
The seven upper heavenly locations

Urdhvaloka is a compound of two Sanskrit words, urdhva and loka. Urdhva means "upper" or "higher" and loka means "world" or "plane" thus urdhvaloka means upper world.

== List of lokas ==
=== Bhuloka ===
The sphere of the Earth or Bhuloka (‘Bhu’ means ‘Earth’ and ‘loka’ means the surface of the Earth), comprehending its oceans, mountains, and rivers, extends as far as it is illuminated by the rays of the Sun and Moon; and to the same extent, both in diameter and circumference, the sphere of the sky (Bhuvaloka) spreads above it (as far upwards as to the planetary sphere, or Svargaloka).

=== Bhuvarloka ===
The region, where the siddhas and other celestial beings move, is the Earth's atmospheric sphere which also contains space which has its neighbouring planets in the Solar System along with stars and comets. It is also where arhats, siddhas, bodhisattvas, buddhas reside.

=== Svargaloka ===
The interval between the Sun and Dhruva, extending fourteen hundred thousand leagues, is inhabited by the devas, including devis with their king Indra and its references make it equivalent to the Svarga (heaven), while some Puranic references equate Svargaloka to the Solar System.

=== Maharloka ===
Above Dhruva, at the distance of ten million leagues, lies the sphere of saints, or Maharloka, the inhabitants of which dwell in it throughout a kalpa, or day of Brahma.

=== Janaloka ===
At twice that distance is situated Janaloka, where the Sanandana (Four Kumaras) and other pure-minded children of Brahma reside.

=== Tapaloka ===
At four times the distance, between the two last, lies the Tapaloka (the sphere of penance), inhabited by the immortal beings and deities called Vaibhrájas, who are highly knowledgeable, pure, and enlightened, whereby they can easily travel to the uppermost realm, Satyaloka, are unconsumable by fire of destruction during the dissolution of the universe.

=== Satyaloka ===
Satyaloka is the highest plane of consciousness or the highest of the heavenly realms. It is also called Brahmaloka, where Brahman and his consort, Maya Shakti, reside. It is six times the distance (or twelve crores, 120 million leagues) and is referred to as the sphere of truth, where all knowledge is available and the inhabitants never die or experience aging, illness, pain or anxiety.

== Relationship to the Trailokya and the Patalas ==
The seven urdhvalokas are the upper half of a fourteen-world scheme, paired with seven descending pātālas - Atala, Vitala, Sutala, Talatala, Mahatala, Rasatala, and Patala - inhabited by Daityas, Danavas, and Nagas. This fuller fourteen-world system is a later elaboration of the older and more basic Vedic division into three worlds, or trailokya: earth, atmosphere, and heaven. In this threefold scheme, Bhuloka, Bhuvarloka, and Svargaloka correspond respectively to the earth, the intermediate atmosphere, and heaven, while the remaining four urdhvalokas represent a later refinement extending the heavenly tier into successive gradations.

== Cosmographic interpretation ==
Modern scholarship has approached the Puranic description of the ūrdhvalokas less as an arbitrary Cosmological catalogue and more as a structured cosmographic model, comparable in its internal logic to systems of projection used in classical geography and astronomy. This cosmography is closely bound up with Puranic astronomy (jyotishishastra), sharing both terminology and structural assumptions with that discipline. At the same time, scholars caution against conflating the Puranic and Vedic cosmographic material, which is concerned primarily with astronomical description, with later interpretive traditions that map the lokas onto the subtle body or psychosomatic centers - an association that belongs to a distinct, later interpretive layer rather than to the jyotiḥśāstra material itself.

== See also ==
- Patala Loka
- Jainism and non-creationism
- Loka
