= Devaloka =

Abodes of the gods in Hindu Mythology

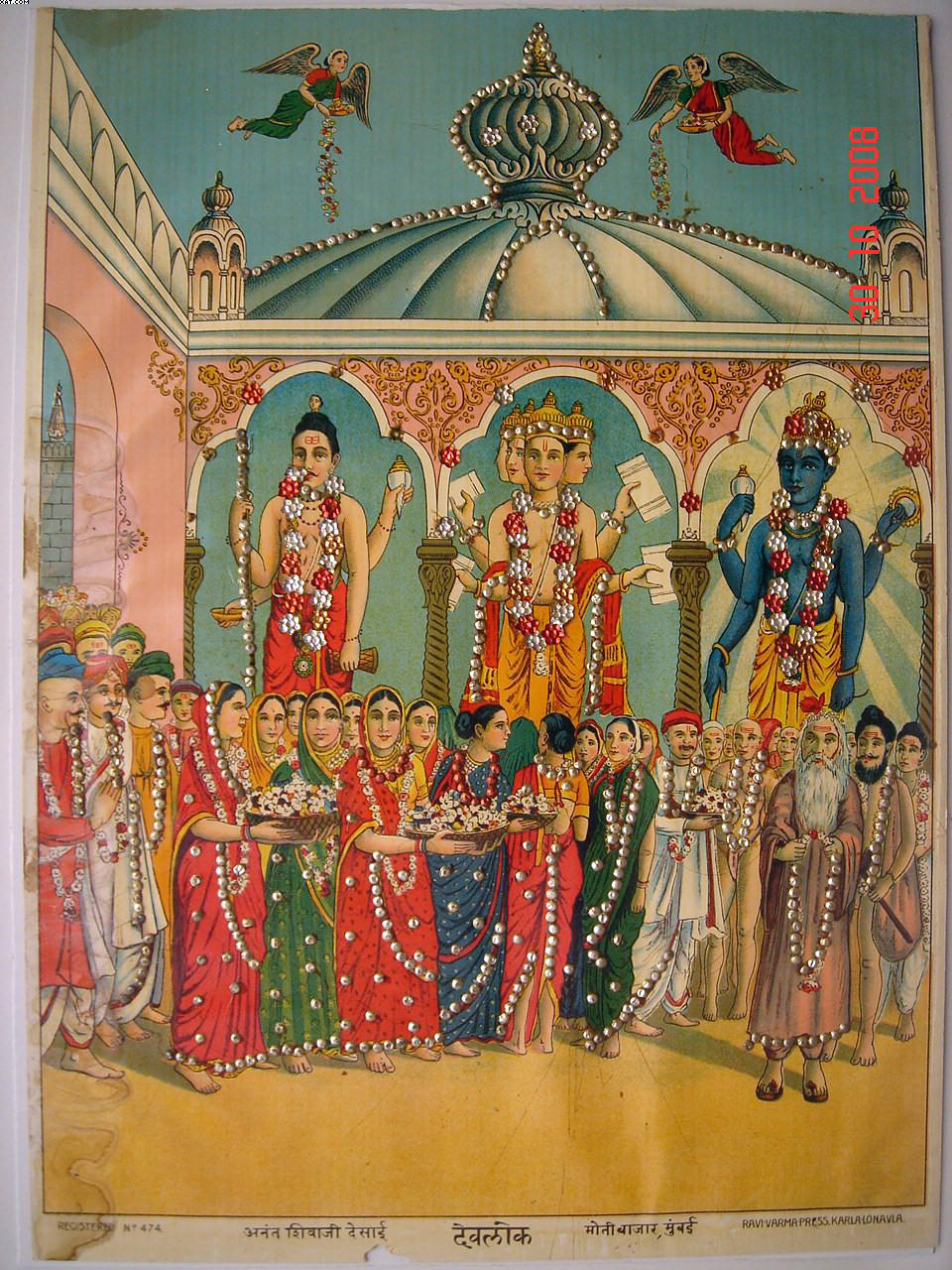
The Trimurti in Devaloka

In Indian religions, a devaloka or deva loka is a plane of existence where gods aka devas exist. The deva lokas are usually described as places of eternal light and goodness, similar to the concept of Heaven. Teachers of different Hindu denominations may call such homes of the gods by other names, including Svarga, each differing in non-fundamental aspects.

Hindu beliefs are vast and diverse, and thus Hinduism is often referred to as a family of religions rather than a single religion. Thus, devaloka is viewed by many Hindu sects as a stopping point onto the final destination of an eternal heaven. These higher planes include Vishnuloka (Vaikuntha), Brahmaloka (Satyaloka) and Sivaloka (Kailasa), places of union with Vishnu, Brahma and Shiva. Within Hindu traditions, a Devaloka is understood as either a temporary planes of existence due to one's good karma, or a permanent plane of existence that is reached when one is sufficiently attuned to light and good. Within Hindu traditions where devaloka is understood as temporary, one must return to a life on Earth to become better and learn more and thus attain liberation (moksha). When moksha is achieved, any other lives become unnecessary and one does not return to Earth.

In Buddhism, a deva loka is a dwelling place of the Buddhist devas. The worlds of the devas differ greatly from each other depending on the nature of their inhabitants. See Buddhist cosmology.

== See also ==
- Antarloka
- Narakaloka
