= Gayatri =

Personification of the Gayatri Mantra

- Mother of the Vedas; Personification of the Gayatri Mantra
- Member of Pancha Prakriti
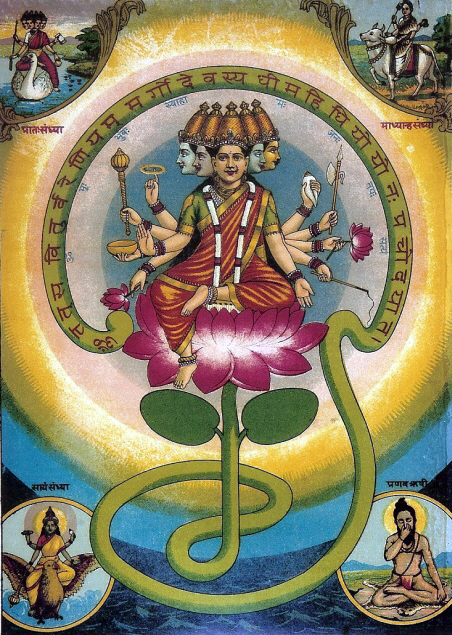
- Illustration by Raja Ravi Verma. In illustrations, the goddess often sits on a lotus flower and appears with five heads and five pairs of hands, within the Tamil form of the sacred symbol "Om".
- Other names: Saraswati, Savitri, Vedamata
- Devanagari: गायत्री
- Sanskrit transliteration: gāyatrī
- Affiliation: Devi, Saraswati, Mahadevi
- Abode: Satyaloka
- Mantra: Gayatri Mantra
- Symbol: Vedas
- Mount: Hamsa
- Festivals: Gayatri Jayanti, Saraswati Puja
- Consort: Brahma

Gayatri (Sanskrit: गायत्री, IAST: Gāyatrī) is the personified form of the Gayatri Mantra, a popular hymn from Vedic texts. She is also known as Savitri, and holds the title of Vedamata ('mother of the Vedas'). Gayatri is the manifestation of Saraswati and is often associated with Savitṛi, a solar deity in the Vedas, and her consort in the Puranas is the creator god Brahma. Gayatri is also an epithet for the various goddesses and she is also identified as "Supreme pure consciousness".

== Origin ==
Gayatri was the name initially applied to a metre of the Rig Veda consisting of 24 syllables. In particular, it refers to the Gayatri Mantra and the Goddess Gāyatrī as that mantra personified. The Gayatri mantra composed in this triplet form is the most famous. Most of the scholars identify Gayatri as the feminine form of Gayatra, another name of the Vedic Solar god which is also one of the synonyms of Savitri andSavitṛi.

Scholar Dominik Haas argues that the goddess Savitri, as the embodiment of the Gayatri Mantra, is rooted in the post-Vedic period. First, with the Jaiminiya Upanishad Brahmana as a female counterpart to Savitr who the mantra extolls, although he argues this is a weak deification and better understood as simply a quality. Second, with the Gopatha Brahmana, in which Savitr and Savitri become the parents of the Vedic student inducted with the upanayana, and Savitri is declared the mother of the Vedas who students ought to worship. The Savitri Upanishad includes a prayer to her as a goddess. Then with the Mahanarayana Upanishad, she is extolled, explicitly linked with the Gayatri Mantra, and extolled as the same goddess as Saraswati; Haas suggests that prior evocations of her were ambiguous on whether they truly meant the mantra or rather the Gayatri meter, and this was the first unambiguous evocation of her as this mantra, as well as of this mantra as the mother of the Vedas. The exaltation of the Gayatri Mantra, which emerged as the Vedas fell out of focus, only escalated the prominence of this goddess, with the Mahabharata going so far as to declare the Vedas originated by coming out of her mouth.

Simultaneously, Haas notes a Vedic goddess, Sūryā, a daughter of Savitr, and who in this relation became described as sāvitrī in the Atharva Veda but having nothing whatsoever to do with the Gayatri Mantra. Given aspects such as an early swayamvara wedding where her radiant beauty made many gods attempt to woo her, he connects her to an early Indo-European prototype, connecting her to such figures as Helen of Troy. Persisting to the Mahabharata, with the story of Savitri and Satyavan, these two goddesses were first fused into one through Ashwapati praying to her for a daughter. He argues this conflation of the two goddesses would have come to a shock to the ancient audience, and that this may have had a "comical aspect".Additionally, he suggests the person of Savitri, the heroine of this story, unifies their qualities as both radiant and wise. But altogether, he suggests, this gave her both a form and agency which pushed a story forward. Haas hypothesizes that the story came during a time where the goddesses were beginning to be fused, but the process was not complete; as late as the Harshacharita, the two were portrayed as friends. But the importance of the Mahabharata story, combined with the prominence of the Gayatri Mantra, meant the fusion of the two into one, along with another strong tradition of fusing her with Saraswati as the mantra became a symbol of knowledge.

== Iconography ==
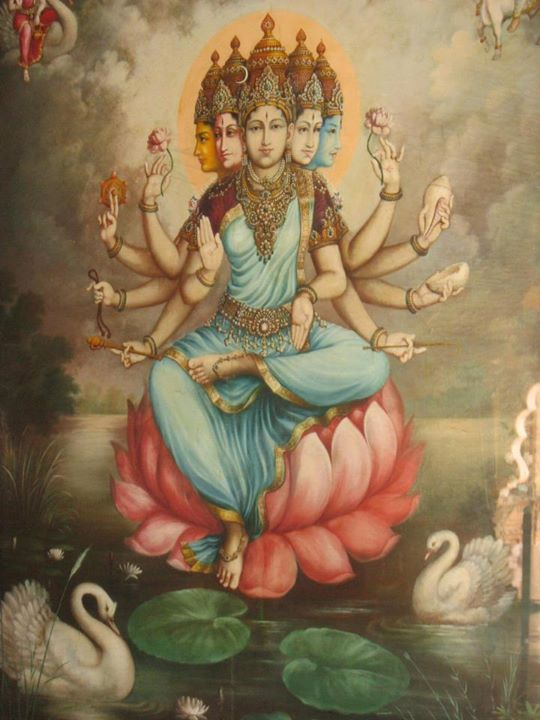
A modern depiction of goddess Gayatri

Early bronze images of Gayatri appear in the Himachal Pradesh, where she was revered as the consort of Sadasiva. Some of these forms are terrific in nature. One of the bronze images of Gayatri dated back to 10th century CE was obtained from Champa region and is now preserved in Delhi museum. It appears with five faces and ten hands holding, sword, lotus, trident, disc, skull, Varada in left and goad, noose, a manuscript, the jar of ambrosia and Abhaya in right. She resides in the mount Nandi. Modern depictions illustrates swan as her mount. The old iconography of Shaivite Manonmani Gayatri was misunderstood as the same of Brahmanic Gayatri later and paintings of Gayatri appears from 18th century CE in which she is often portrayed with third eye, crescent moon and five heads with five different colors same like Sadasiva.

The well known form of Gayatri with the Saivite influence appears having five heads (Mukta, Vidruma, Hema, Neela, Dhavala) with the ten eyes looking in eight directions plus the earth and sky, and ten arms holding various types of weapons attributed to Shiva, Vishnu, and Brahma. Another recent depiction is accompanied by a white swan holding a book to portray knowledge in one hand and a cure in the other, as the goddess of learning. She is also depicted four-armed, seated on a swan, holding weapons symbolising the Trimurti: The Vedas of Brahma, the discus of Vishnu, the trident of Shiva, and Varada mudra.

She also has an fearsome three-faced depiction; two faces look like that of goddess Kali and one calm one and holding weapons like the deity Mahakali. She is shown mounted on a lotus holding lotus, noose, trident, Scimitar and vard mudra in right whereas conch, discus, bow-arrow, goad and abhaya mudra in left.

== Associations ==
The Mahanarayana Upanishad, attached to the Krishna Yajurveda (Note: specifically, in Taittirīya Araṇyaka Pariśiṣṭa 10.25), describes Gayatri as white-colored (Sanskrit: श्वेतवर्णा, śvetavarṇā), with the gotra of sage Viswamitra (Sanskrit: सान्ख्यायनस गोत्रा, sānkhyāyanasa gotrā), composed of 24 letters (Sanskrit: चतुर्विंशत्यक्षरा, caturviṃśatyakṣarā), three-footed (Sanskrit: त्रिपदा, tripadā), six-bellied (Sanskrit: षट्कुक्षिः, ṣaṭkukṣiḥ), five-headed (Sanskrit: पञ्चशीर्षः, pañcaśīrṣaḥ) and the used in the Upanayana of dvijas (Sanskrit: उपनयने विनियोगः, upanayane viniyogaḥ).

The Taittiriya Sandhya Bhashyam describes the three feet of Gayatri as representing the first 3 Vedas (Ṛk, Yajus, Sāma). The six bellies represent 4 cardinal directions, along with the two more directions, namely Ūrdhva (Zenith) and Adhara (Nadir). The five heads represent 5 among the Vedangas, namely vyākaraṇa, śikṣā, kalpa, nirukta and jyotiṣa.

The Mantramahārṇava, citing Gayatri Tantra, describes Gayatri's 24 letters and its representation that are given below.

=== 24 Letters of Gayatri mantra ===
The Gayatri Mantra has 24 letters or syllables (see Sanskrit phonology; for this reason, in Sanskrit, it called the Gāyatrī Caturviṃśatyakṣarā (transl. Gayatri of Twenty-Four Letters). They are

1. tat
2. sa
3. vi
4. tur
5. va
6. re
7. ṇi
8. yaṃ
9. bhar
10. go
11. de
12. va
13. sya
14. dhī
15. ma
16. hi
17. dhi
18. yo
19. yo
20. naḥ
21. pra
22. cho
23. da
24. yāt.

Note that in this scheme, the word vareṇyam is treated as vareṇiyam. However, according to Hindu tradition, it is properly chanted as vareṇyam.

=== 24 Rishis of Gayatri ===
Beyond this, the 24 Letters of the Gayatri Mantra represents 24 Vedic rishis. They are:

1. Vāmadeva
2. Atri
3. Vaśiṣṭha
4. Śukra
5. Kaṇva
6. Parāśara
7. Viśvāmitra
8. Kapila
9. Śaunaka
10. Yājñavalkya
11. Bharadwāja
12. Jamadagni
13. Gautama
14. Mudgala
15. Vyāsa
16. Lomasa
17. Agastya
18. Kauśika
19. Vatsa
20. Pulastya
21. Manḍūka
22. Dūrvāsa
23. Nārada
24. Kaśyapa.

=== 24 Meters of Gayatri ===
The 24 letters of the Gayatri Mantra additionally represent 24 Vedic meters (known in Sanskrit as Chandas). They are:

1. Gāyatri
2. Uṣnik
3. Anuṣṭubh
4. Bṛhati
5. Paṃkti
6. Triṣṭubh
7. Jagati
8. Atijagati
9. Śakvari
10. Atiśakvari
11. Dhṛti
12. Atidhṛti
13. Virāṭ
14. Prastārapaṃkti
15. Kṛti
16. Prakṛti
17. Akṛti
18. Vikṛti
19. Saṃskṛti
20. Akṣarapaṃkti
21. Bhūḥ
22. Bhuvaḥ
23. Swaḥ
24. Jyotiṣmati.

=== 24 Vedic Devatas of Gayatri ===
The 24 Letters of Gayatri mantra represent 24 Vedic Devatas. They are: 1.agni, 2.prajāpati, 3.soma, 4.īśāna, 5.savitā, 6. āditya, 7.bṛhaspati, 8. maitrāvaruṇa 9. bhaga, 10.āryamaan, 11.gaṇeśa, 12.tvaṣṭā, 13.pūṣā, 14. indrāgni, 15.vāyu, 16.vāmadeva, 17.maitrāvaruṇi 18. viśvedevā, 19. mātṛkā, 20.viṣṇu, 21.vasu, 22. rudra, 23.kubera and 24.aśvins

The Padmapurana (in Sṛṣṭi Kānḍa) mentions 24 Adhi-Devatas (presiding deities) for each of the 24 letters of Gayatri mantra. They are 1.agni, 2.vāyu, 3.sūrya, 4.ākāśa, 5.yama, 6.varuṇa, 7.bṛhaspati, 8.parjanya, 9.indra, 10.gandharva, 11.pūṣā, 12. mitra, 13.tvaṣṭā, 14.vasu, 15.marut, 16.soma, 17.āṅgiras, 18.viśvedevā, 19.aśvins, 20.prajāpati, 21.akṣara (tattva), 22.rudra, 23.brahma and 24.viṣṇu.

The Yoga yājñavalkya mentions 24 Devatas for each of the 24 letters of Gayatri mantra. They are 1.agni, 2.vāyu, 3.sūrya, 4.īśāna, 5.āditya, 6.āṅgiras, 7.pitri, 8. bharga, 9.āryamān, 10.gandharva, 11.pūṣā, 12. maitrāvaruṇa, 13.tvaṣṭā, 14.vasu, 15.vāmadeva, 16.maitrāvaruṇi, 17.jñeya, 18.viśvedevā, 19.viṣṇu, 20.prajāpati, 21.sarvadevā, 22.kubera, 23.aśvins and 24.brahma.

=== 24 Śaktis of Gayatri ===
The 24 Letters of Gayatri mantra represent 24 Śaktis. They are: 1.vāmadevī, 2.priyā, 3.satyā, 4.viśwabhadrā, (Note: Some texts refer to it as viśwā.) 5.vilāsinī, (Note: Some texts refer to it as bhadravilāsinī.) 6.prabhāvatī, 7.jayā, 8.śantā, 9.kāntā, 10.durgā, 11.saraswatī, 12.vidrumā, 13.viśālesā, (Note: Some texts refer to it as two; viśālā and īsā.) 14.vyāpinī, 15.vimalā, 16.tamopahārini, 17.sūkṣmā, 18.viśwayoni 19.jayā, (Note: Some texts refer to it as jayāvahā.) 20.vaśā, 21.padmālayā, 22.parāśobhā, (Note: Some texts refer to it as padmaśobhā.) 23.bhadrā, and 24. tripadā.

=== 24 Tattvas of Gayatri ===
The 24 Letters of Gayatri mantra represent 24 Tattvas. They are

1. Five Bhūtas, namely, pṛthivi (Earth), apas (Water), agni (Fire), vāyu (Air) and ākāśa (Sky).
2. Five Tanmātras, namely, gandha (smell), rasa (taste), rūpa (form), sparśa (touch) and śabda (sound).
3. Five Karmendriyas (i.e. motor organs), namely, upasthā (sexual organ), pāyu (anus), pāda (leg), pāni (hand) and vāk (mouth).
4. Five Jñānendriyas (i.e. sense organs), namely, ghrāna (nose), jihvā (tongue), caksus (eye), tvak (skin) and śrotra (ear).
5. Four Vāyus (air), namely, Prāṇa, Apāna, Vyāna and Samāna

However, in classical definition of 24 tattvas, the last four are the antahkaranas (i.e. sense organs), namely, manas (mind), buddhi (intellect), citta (state of mind) and ahaṅkāra (ego).

=== The Mudras of Gayatri ===
The Gayatri mantra represents some mahāmudras (great hand gestures). They are 1. sumukha, (Note: Some texts refer to it as sanmukha) 2. sampuṭa, 3. vitata, 4. visṛta, 5. dvimukha, 6. trimukha, 7. catuḥ, 8. pañcamukha, 9. ṣaṇmukha, 10. adhomukha, 11. vyāpakāñjali, 12. śakaṭa, 13. yamapāśa, 14. grathita, 15. sanmukhonmukha, 16. vilamba, (Note: Some texts refer to it as pralamba) 17. muṣtika, 18. matsya, 19. kūrmah 20. varāhaka, 21. simhākrānta, 22. mahākrānta, 23. mudgara, 24. pallava, 25. triśūla, 26. yoni, 27. surabhi, 28. akṣamāla, 29. linga, 30. ambuja.

Since, the first 24 are used before Gayatri Japa, they are traditionally referred as Pūrva Mudras.

== Legends ==
In some Puranas, Gayatri is said to be the other names of Sarasvati, the wife of Brahma. According to the Matsya Purana, Brahma's left half emerged as a female, who is celebrated under the names of Sarasvati, Savitri, and Gayatri. The three represent purity in thought, word, and deed (thrikarana shuddhi). Although Gayatri has three names, all three are in each of us as the senses (Gayatri), the power of speech (Saraswathi), and the life force (Savitri). In Kurma Purana, Gautama rishi was blessed by Goddess Gayatri and able to eliminate the obstacles he faced in his life. The Skanda Purana writes that Gayatri is married to Brahma, making her a form of Saraswati.

According to some texts, Brahma's first wife is Savitri, and Gayatri is the second. The story goes that Savitri became angry knowing the wedding of Gayatri with Brahma, and cursed all the gods and goddesses engaged in the event.

However, the Padma Purana narrates the same story with some modifications. After Savitri was appeased by Brahma, Vishnu, and Lakshmi, She accepts Gayatri as her sister happily.

Gayatri further developed into a fierce goddess who could even slay a demon. According to Varaha Purana and Mahabharata, Goddess Gayatri slew the demon Vetrasura, the son of Vritra and river Vetravati, on a Navami day.

== Shaivism ==
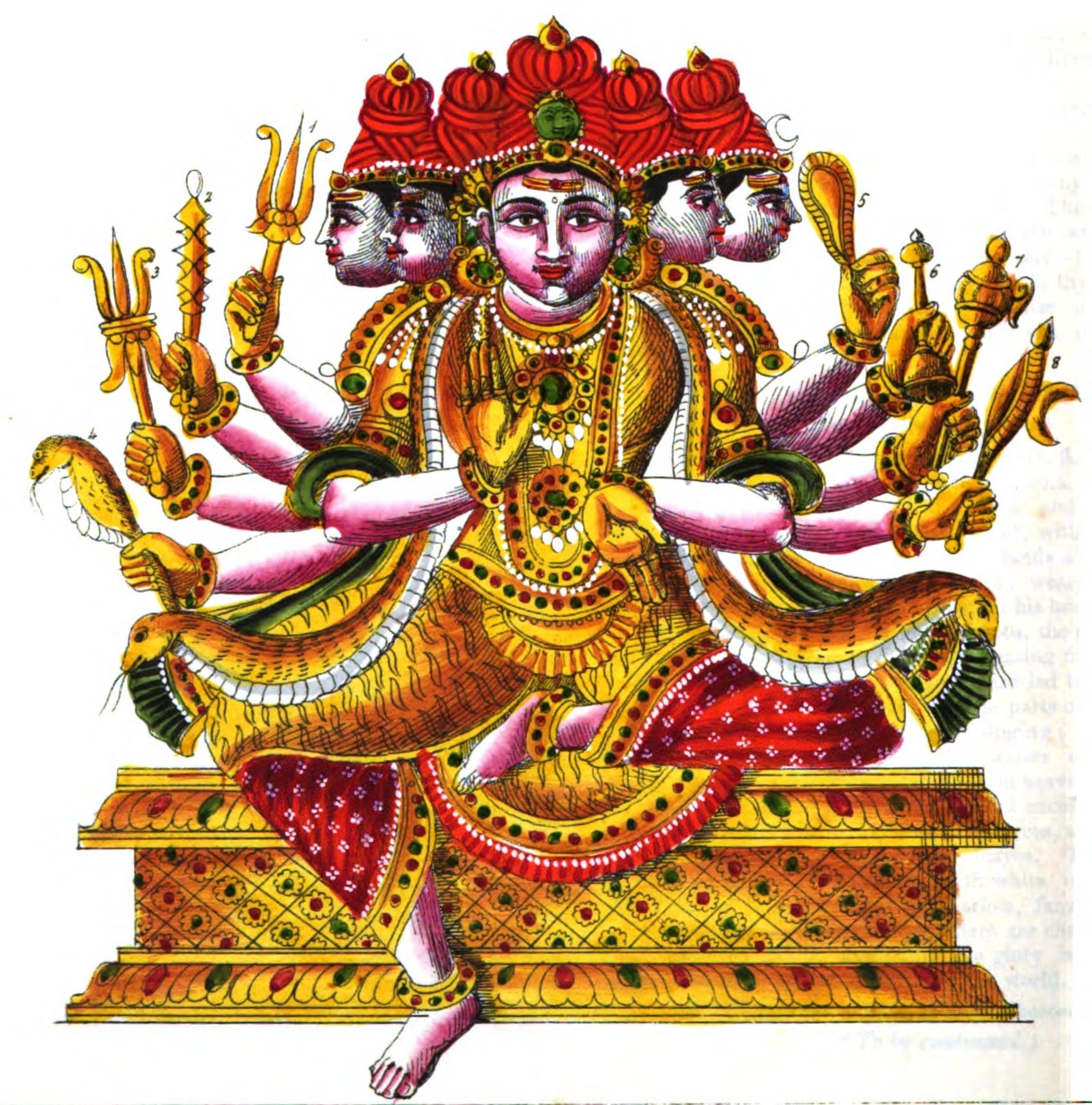
According to Shaivite Siddhantic perspective, Gayatri is the consort of Sadasiva, the supreme being Parashivam.

Shaivism sees Gayatri as the consort of eternal blissful absolute Parashiva who manifests in the form of Sadasiva. Sadashiva's consort Manonmani is none other than the mantra form of Gayatri, who possess the power of her husband Bharga, within her. The popular form of Gayatri with five heads and ten arms was initially found in Saivite iconographies of Manonmani in North India beginning from 10th century CE. The Saivite view on Gayatri seems a later development from the combination of vedic practice of Gayatri reverence and its Saivite inclusion as a manifestation of Shakti. This could be the root for the sublime aspect of Gayatri explained in the later puranas as the killer of demon Vetra identifying her with Adi Parashakti.

== See also ==
- Gayatri Mantra
- Saraswati
- Gaia
