= Tattva (Shaivism) =

Elements or principles of reality

The tattvas in Indian philosophy are elements or principles of reality. Tattvas are the basic concepts to understand the nature of absolute, the souls and the universe in Samkhya and Shaivite philosophies. Samkhya philosophy lists 25 tattvas while later Shaivite philosophies extend the number to 36.

Tattvas are used to explain the structure and origin of the Universe. They are usually divided into three groups: śuddha (pure tattvas); śuddhāśuddha (pure-impure tattvas); and aśuddha (impure tattvas). The pure tattvas describe internal aspects of the Absolute; the pure-impure tattvas describe the soul and its limitations; while the impure tattvas include the universe and living beings that assist the existence of soul.

== Overview ==
Tattva (/ˈtʌtvə/) is a Sanskrit word meaning 'thatness', 'principle', 'reality' or 'truth'. Samkhya philosophy enumerates only 25 tattvas; twenty-four ātma tattvas along with purusha, which is ātman or the soul. Shaivite philosophies elaborate on these, taking the twenty-four ātma tattvas as the aśuddha (impure) tattvas and adding to them the śuddhāśuddha (pure-impure) and śuddha (pure tattvas), enumerating thirty-six distinct tattvas, with purusha being counted among the śuddhāśuddha tattvas.

According to the early Shaivite philosophies, Parameshwara or Parashiva (also spelled Paramashiva, Paramshiva, Parmshiva) is the ultimate reality or Parabrahman, "the one form where everything emerges". The nondualistic monism school of Shaivism, Kashmir Shaivism, describes the tattvas as Paramshiva manifests himself by a process of descent from Paramashiva to jiva, through the 36 tattvas. The vibrant creative energy of Parashiva, known as Spanda, moves him to manifest himself these 36 tattvas as a līlā or divine play. Some teachings treat Parameshwara and Parashiva, along with Parashakti, as three separate aspects of Shiva.

Another important sect of Shaivism, Shaiva Siddhanta, a school that show both Monistic and dualistic qualities, describes the tattvas in a different perspective. Passive Parameshwara is activated itself by śuddha māyā or divine grace (Shakti) of him. Like that, the universe, (Prakriti) is activated by aśudda māyā (physical body and all aspects of universe), another aspect of divine grace - Mahamaya. The interaction of Pure Maya and Impure Maya is the Pure - impure Maya where the souls (Pashus) attain knowledge which leads to the existence of whole universe.

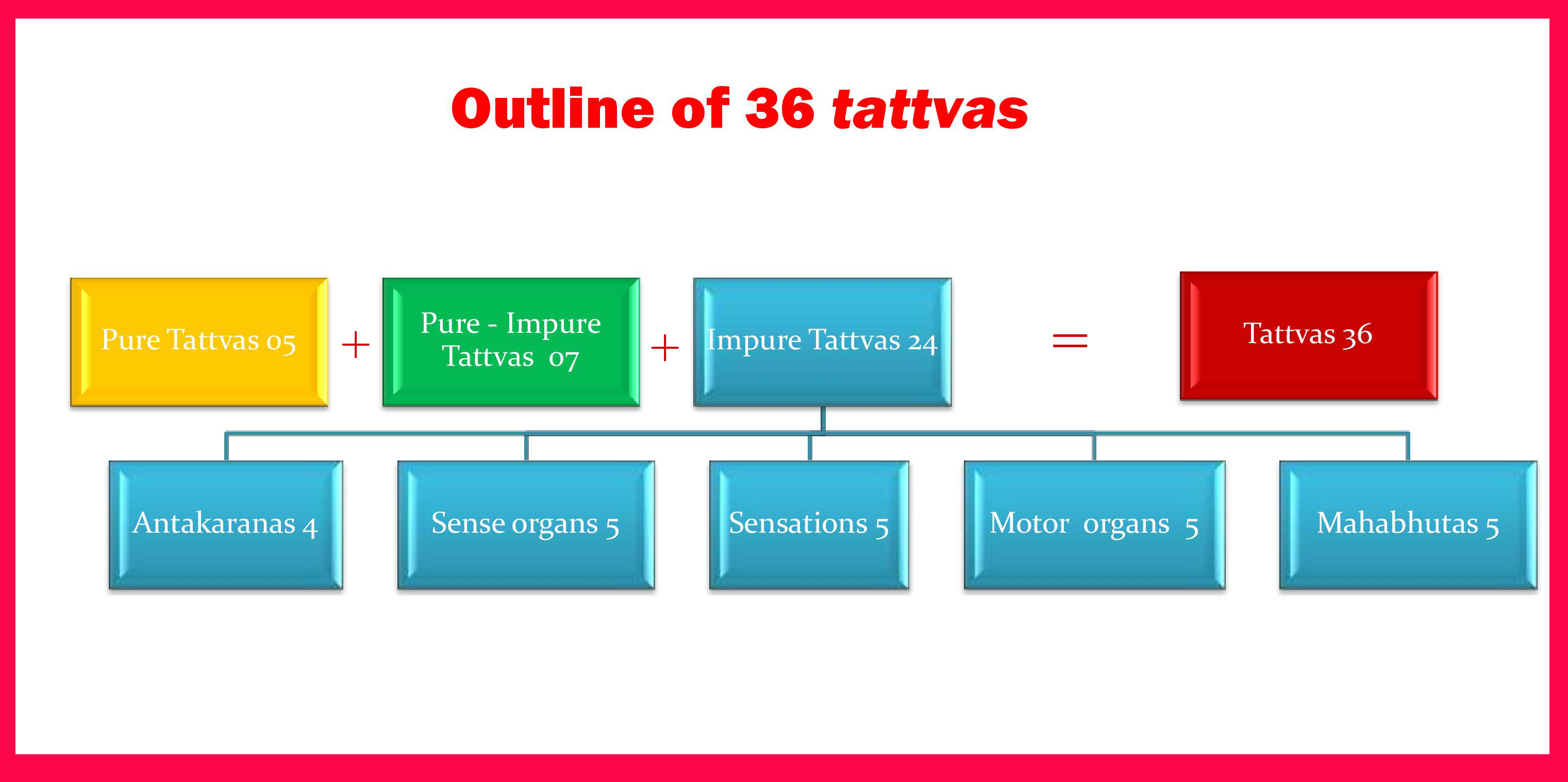
The thirty six Shaivite tattvas are divided into three groups - pure, impure and pure-impure tattvas

Mahāmāyā divides itself into three aspects: śuddha māyā, śuddha-aśuddha māyā, and aśuddha māyā, and causes five, seven, and twenty-four tattvas respectively.

== Five pure tattvas ==
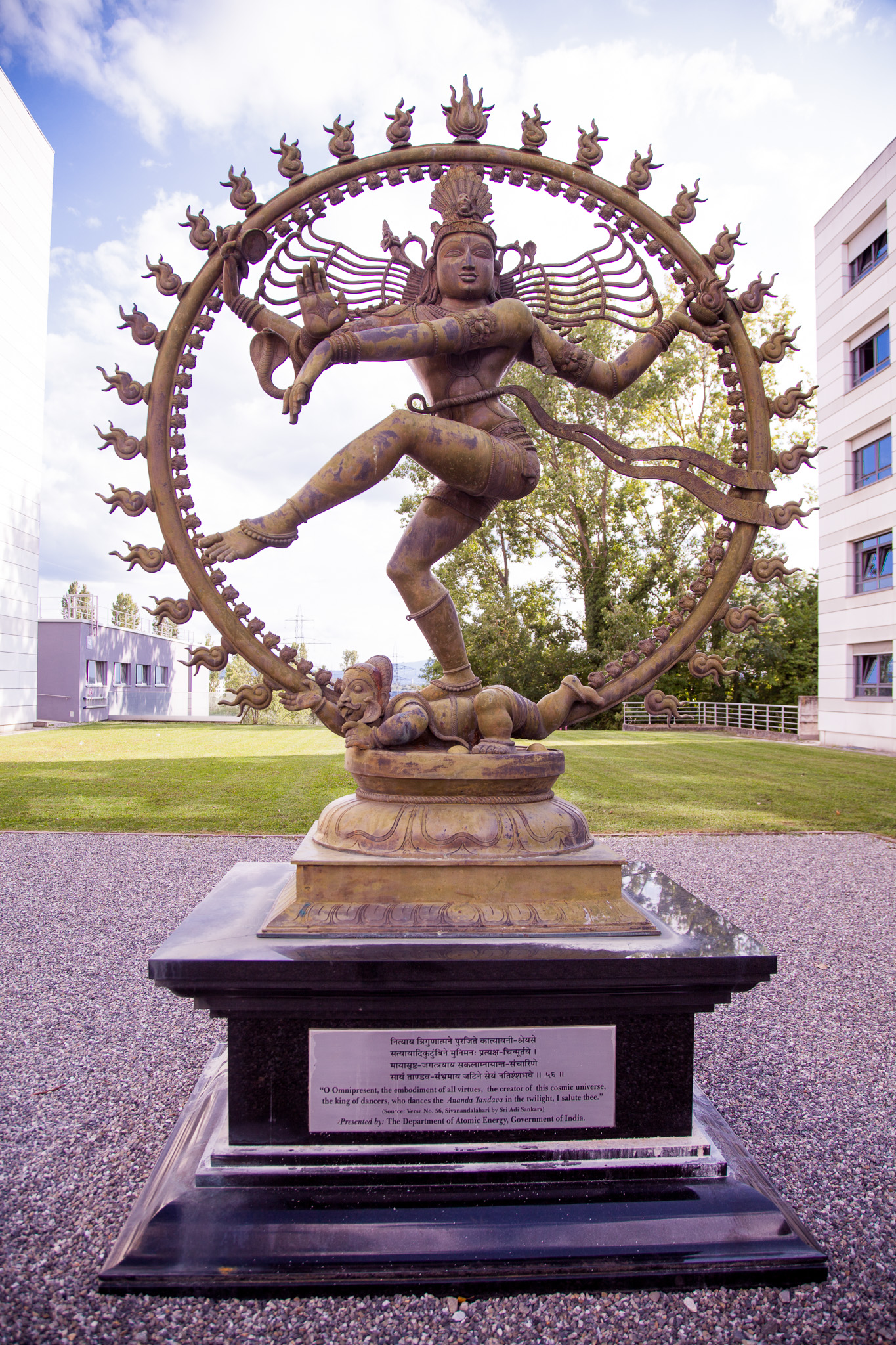
The five pure Saiva tattvas are associated with the five acts of Lord Shiva in his Nataraja depiction.

Suddha tattvas, also known as Śaiva tattvas are functioning in the absolute level which leads to the Panchakritya (Five acts) - Creation - Maintenance - Destruction - Concealment - Grace of almighty. Suddha tattvas are called pure because they are directly created by Shiva himself.

=== Śiva ===
Also known as Nāda tattva. One of the two aspects of the omniscient, omnipresent, conscious Absolute. In this essence, the Absolute doesn't consist of any desire (icchā), action (kriyā) or Knowledge (jnāna) related properties. It is in its pure conscious state.

=== Śakti ===
Another aspect of the Absolute which is known as Bindu Tattva. Pairing of Śiva-Śakti causes the creation of all the lower tattvas. The paired Śiva-Śakti is omniscience and consistently active. These two properties of Śiva-Śakti are known as jnāna and kriyāa respectively.

=== Sadākhya ===
Also called Sadāśiva tattva or Śiva-Śakti tattva. This tattva is responsible for the appearance of aham or self. This tattva is when kriyāśakti and jnānaśakti of the Absolute are in equilibrium.

=== Iśvara ===
Also known as Ishwara tattva. The tattva where the fourth act of Panchakritya - delusion or concealment happens. Iśvara tattva activates the souls which are concealed by pāśa. Idam, "this is myself", i.e., the objectivation of self-awareness is caused by Iśvara tattva.

=== Śuddha Vidyā ===
Also known as Sadvidyā or Kriyā. In this tattva the tri-murthis manifest. Jnānaśakti is more initiative than kriyaśakti in Śuddhavidyā tattva. Here, "self-ness" and "this-ness" become balanced. The other three acts of Panchakritya - creation, maintenance and destruction happen at the suddhavidya.

These five tattvas are the Absolute which leads to the moksha of souls. These five tattvas can also be seen as the retrogradation of souls from their lower state to their higher steps towards liberation.

== Seven pure-impure tattvas ==
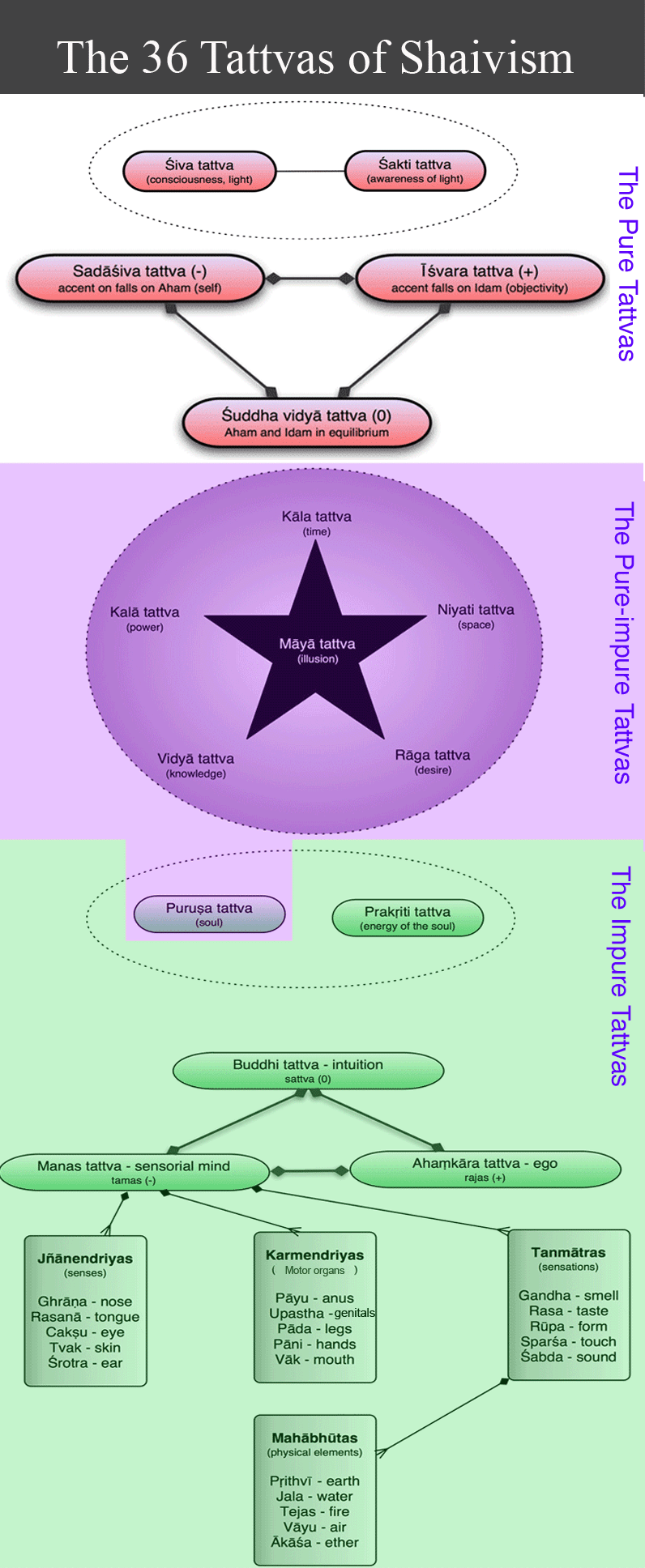
Chart of the 36 tattvas in Kashmir Shaivism

Pure-impure tattvas or Vidya tattvas are described as the "instruments" that assist the souls for their liberation. Soul or Atman is considered as "Purusha tattva" here, while the final manifestation of almighty is known as "Maya tattva". Maya manifests into five more tattvas known as "kanchukas" and these six tattvas adjoins the pusursha tattva and thus, produce seven vidya tattvas.

=== Māyā ===
Maya hides the divine nature of created beings as it creates the sense of separateness from the Divine and from each other.

=== The five kanchukas ===
Kanchukas can be fairly translated as veils. They block the subject from recognising the divine nature of the Universe.

- kāla - the veil of time
- vidyā - the veil of limited knowledge
- rāga - the veil of desire
- niyati - the veil of causality
- kalā - the veil of being limited

=== Purusha ===
Purusha is the soul. It pairs with maya, the final manifestation of god along with five kancukas. These five vidya tattvas are idle in nature. So, Śiva joins with Maya and Śakti joins with three kancukas - Kāla, Niyati, Kalā. Sadasiva joins with purusha and śuddhavidya operates vidya tattva. Raga is operated by Ishvara. The activated purusha with other vidya tattvas cannot solely exist in the universe, and comes with the assistance of upcoming 24 asuddha tattvas.

== Twenty-four impure tattvas ==
Impure tattvas or Atma tattvas are aspects of Universe and physical body.

=== The Four Antahkarana ===
Antahkarana is a collective term for the 4 tattvas-prakṛti, buddhi, ahamkāra and manas. Consciousness within the limited purusha forms the citta made of Intellect (buddhi), Ego (ahamkāra), and Mind (manas), known collectively as the antahkarana, or "inner organ". Buddhi is the first evolute of prakṛti. It represents the capacity of discernment. It evolves into ahamkāra after buddhi differentiates a notion of a limited individual self. That external sense of self is then experienced through the sensory mind (manas). Ten indriyas (five sense organs and five action organs), five tanmātras (subtle elements), five mahābhūtas (gross elements), and the sensory mind evolve from ahamkāra as it modifies into sattvic (sensory), rajasic (active) and tamasic (material) modes. These 24 lowest tattvas that evolve from individual consciousness are known as the impure tattvas (aśuddha).

=== Five sense organs ===
The five sense organs (jñānendriya) are the most sattvic functions of manas and include:

- ghrāna (nose), i.e., the medium to experience smell
- rasana (tongue), i.e., the medium to experience taste
- caksus (eye), i.e., the medium to experience sight
- tvāk (skin), i.e., the medium to experience touch
- śrotra (ear), i.e., the medium to experience sound

=== Five motor organs ===
The five motor organs (karmendriya), each corresponding to a sense organ, represent the physical organs of action. They are the most rajasic functions of manas.

- pāyu (anus) - the organ responsible for excretion
- upasthā (sexual organ) - the organ that enables procreation and sexual enjoyment
- pāda (leg) - the organ that makes ambulation possible
- pāni (hand) - the organ that enables grabbing and touching
- vāk (mouth) - the organ that makes sound/speech possible

=== Five subtle elements ===
The five subtle elements (tanmātra) are the most tamasic functions of manas and represent the reflection of the corresponding five gross elements in the mind:

- gandha (smell)
- rasa (taste)
- rūpa (form)
- sparśa (touch)
- śabda (sound)

=== Five gross elements ===
The five gross elements (mahābhuta) represent the final point of manifestation:

- prthvi (earth)
- jala (water)
- tejas (fire)
- vāyu (air)
- ākāśa (ether or space)

While mahābhūtas are the basis for the material world, tanmātras are but limited aspects and views of it, in no way able to fully describe it. We cannot actually perceive the reality, all we can access are limited "bands" of information that form a description of reality. These bands of information are the five tanmātras.

This restriction however applies only to the limited beings (jiva, or aṇu). For one who has gone beyond māyā, in the realm of the pure tattvas, there can be direct perception of reality, because as one's self is Ātman, so are the external objects. In such a state an enlightened being can perceive the world beyond the five senses (direct perception), in a state of diversity in unity and unity in diversity.

== See also ==
- Aṇḍa, the four spheres of reality
- Tattva (Samkhya)
- Shaiva Siddhanta
- Trika
- Three Bodies Doctrine (Vedanta)

== Sources ==
- Lakshman Joo, Swami (1988). Kaśmir Śaivism. pag. 1
- Eliade, Mircea. Theory and History of Religion. cap. 6 and 7
- Singh, Jaideva (1979). Siva Sutras: The Yoga of Supreme Identity. Delhi: Motilal Banarsidas.
