= Hindu tantric literature =

Scriptures of esoteric Hinduism

Hindu tantric literature refers to esoteric scriptures in Hinduism.

== Classes ==
The word tantra is made up by the joining (sandhi in Sanskrit) of two Sanskrit words: tanoti (expansion) and trayati (liberation). Tantra means liberation of energy and expansion of consciousness from its gross form. It is a method to expand the mind and liberate the dormant potential energy, and its principles form the basis of all yogic practices. Hence, the Hindu tantric scriptures refer to techniques for achieving a result.

The Hindu tantras total 92 scriptures; of these, 64 are purely Abheda (literally "without differentiation", or monistic), known as the Bhairava Tantras or Kashmir Śaivite Tantras, 18 are Bhedābheda (literally "with differentiation and without differentiation" monistic or dualistic), known as the Rudra Tantras), and 10 are completely Bheda (literally "differentiated" or dualistic), known as the Śiva Tantras. The latter two (Rudra Tantras and Śiva Tantras) are used by the Śaiva Siddhāntins, and thus are sometimes referred to as Shaiva Siddhanta Tantras, or Śaiva Siddhānta Āgamas.

Tantra are mainly two types: Agama and Nigama. Agamas are those texts in which Goddess asked questions and the God replied. In Nigama texts, God asked questions and Goddess replied. This dialogue between God and Goddess is special feature of Hindu Tantra.

== Origin ==
In the Nāth Tradition, legend ascribes the origin of tantra to Dattatreya, a semi-mythological yogi and the assumed author of the Jivanmukta Gita ("Song of the liberated soul"). Matsyendranath is credited with authorship of the Kaulajñāna-nirnāya, a voluminous ninth-century tantra dealing with a host of mystical and magical subjects. This work occupies an important position in the Hindu tantric lineage, as well as in Tibetan Vajrayana Buddhism.

== Function ==
In distinction to Vedic ritual, which is traditionally performed out-of-doors without idols or emblems, the Tantric ritual is largely a matter of temples and idols. The tantras are largely descriptions and specifications for the construction and maintenance of temple structures with their resident idols and lingas, for example is the Ajita Māhātantra.

Another function was the conservation of esoteric texts for the exclusive use of rulers in rituals directed to deities controlling political affairs, for example the Śārada-tilaka Tantra.

== Texts ==
Tantric texts are usually associated with a particular tradition and deity. The different types of Tantric literature are tantra, Āgama, saṃhitā, sūtra, upaniṣad, tīkā (commentaries), prakaraṇa, paddhati texts, stotram, kavaca, nighaṇṭu, koṣa and hagiographical literature. They are written in Sanskrit and in regional languages. The major textual tantra traditions with some key exemplary texts is as follows:

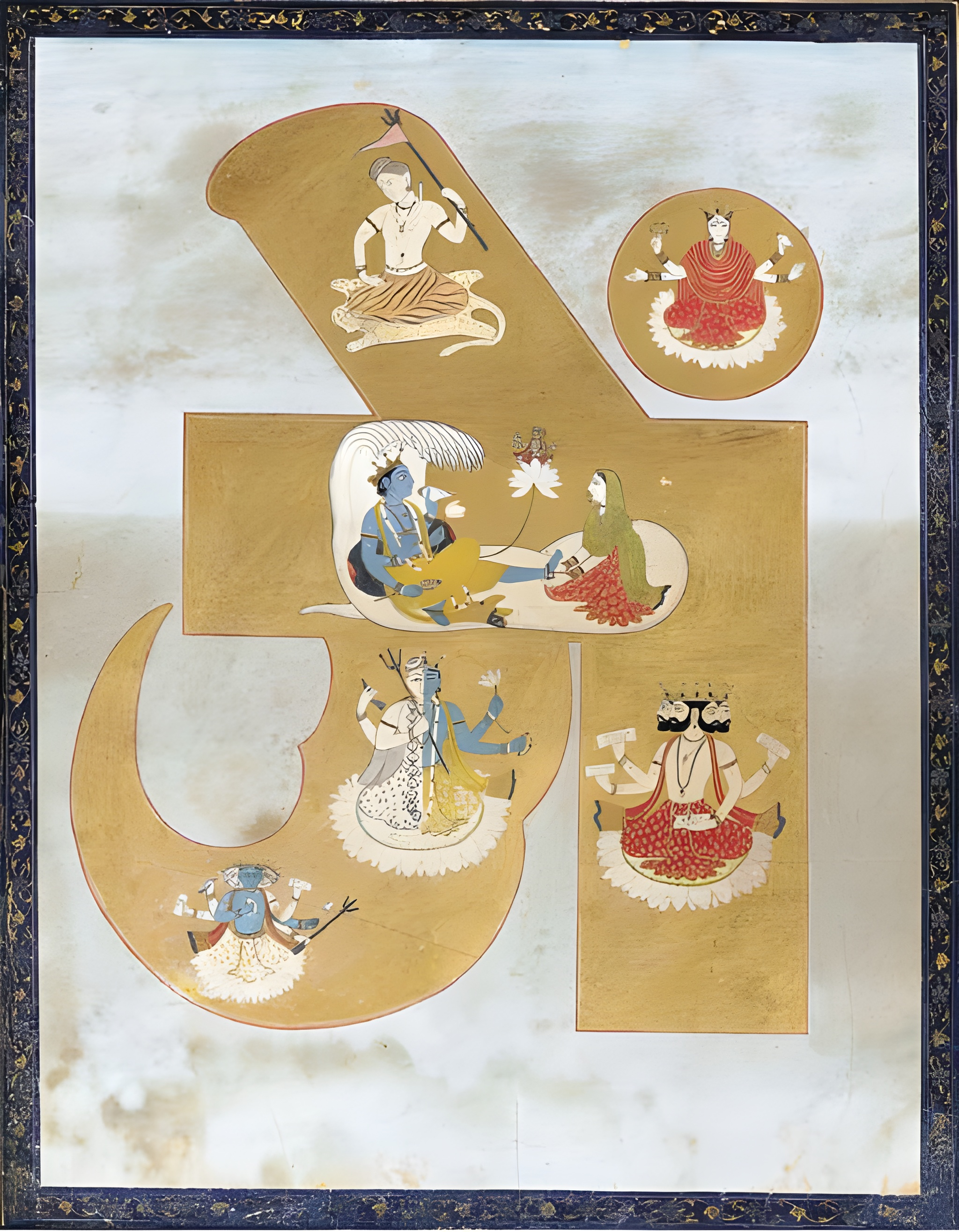
A Hindu Tantric Painting. India, Pahari, circa 1780-1800. Depicting from top to bottom: Shiva, Sakti, Vishnu with his conch, Brahma sprouting from his navel, and Lakshmi. Below is Harihara and four-headed Brahma. At bottom is Trimurti. All painted against a gold ground forming the stylized seed syllable Om.

- Śaiva – Sadaśiva (Śivagama), Vāma or Tumburu, Dakṣiṇa or Bhairava
  - Kularnava Tantra
  - Amṛteṣaṭantra or Netratantra
  - Netragyanarṇava tantra
  - Niḥśvāsatattvasaṃhitā
  - Kālottārā tantra
  - Sarvajñānottārā
  - Ṣaivāgamas
  - Raudrāgamas
  - Bhairavāgamas
  - Vāma Āgamas
  - Dakṣiṇāgamas
- Śivaśakti traditions – Yāmala (also part of Bhairava tradition)
  - Brahma yāmala
  - Rudra yāmala
  - Skanda yāmala
  - Viṣṇu yāmala
  - Yama yāmala
  - Yāyu yāmala
  - Kubera yāmala
  - Indra yāmala

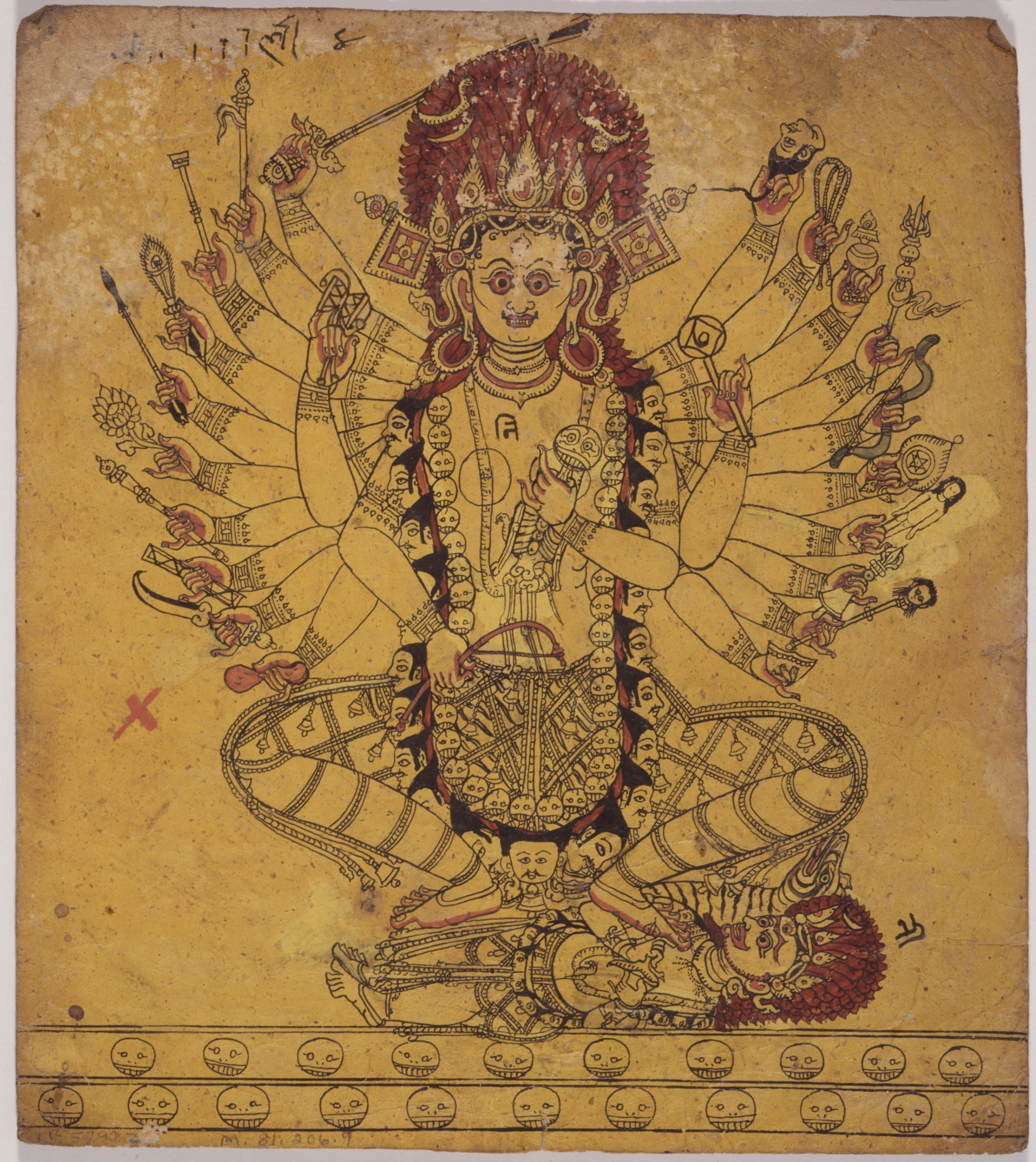
A tantric form of the Hindu Goddess Kali. Folio from a book of Iconography, Nepal, 17th century.

- Śākta – Kālī traditions (Kālī, Kālī Viṣṇu, Kāmākhyā/Kubjika, Tārā and Others), Śrīkula tradition
  - Varahi Tantra
  - Shakta Agamas
  - Muṇḍamālā tantra
  - Toḍala tantra
  - Cāmuṇḍa tantra
  - Devīyāmala
  - Mādhavakula
  - Yonigahavara,
  - Kālīkulārṇava tantra
  - Kaṇkālamālinī tantra
  - Jhaṃkārakaravīra,
  - Mahākāla saṃhitā
  - Kālī tantra
  - Kālajñāna tantra
  - Kumārī tantra
  - Siddhalaharī tantra
  - Niruttārā tantra
  - Kālīvilāsa tantra
  - Utpatti tantra
  - Kāmadhenu tantra
  - Nirvāṇa tantra
  - Kāmākhyā tantra
  - Tārā tantra
  - Kaula tantra
  - Matsya Sūkta / Tārā Kalpa
  - Samayā tantra
  - Vāmakeshvara tantra
  - Tantrajā tantra
  - Yoginī tantra
- Kula - Kulamārga and Other tantras
  - Kulārṇava tantra
  - Mahānirvāṇa tantra
  - Kulacūḍāmaṇi tantra
  - Guptasādhana tantra
  - Mātṛkābheda tantra
- Vaiṣṇava – Vaikhanasas, Pancharatra, bhakti-oriented tantras of Kṛṣṇa and Rāma
  - Pāñcarātra saṃhitā texts
  - Ahirbudhnya Saṃhitā
  - Jayākhya saṃhitā
  - Pārameśvara saṃhitā
  - Pauśkara saṃhitā
  - Pādma saṃhitā
  - Nāradīya saṃhitā
  - Haṃsaparameśvara saṃhitā
  - Lakṣmī tantra
  - Vaihāyasa saṃhitā
  - Śrīkālapraā saṃhitā
  - Vaikhānasa Āgamas
  - Gautamīya tantra
  - Bṛhadbrahma saṃhitā
  - Māheśvara tantra
  - Sātvata tantra
  - Rādhā tantra
  - Agastya saṃhitā and Dāśarathīya tantra
  - Īśāna saṃhitā and Ūrdhvāṃnāya saṃhitā
- Mantra-śāstra - textbooks on Mantras, metaphysics of mantric sound, related practices and rituals
  - Prapañcasāra tantra and its commentaries and Ṭīkās
  - Śāradatilaka tantra by Lakṣmaṇa Deśikendra
  - Mantramuktāvali of Paramahaṃsa Pūrṇaprakāśa
  - Mantramahodadhi of Mahīdhara
  - Mantradevaprakāśikā of Viṣṇudeva
  - Mantrakamalākara of Kamalākara Bhaṭṭa
  - Mantraratnākara of Yadunātha Cakravartin
  - Mantramahārṇava of Mādhava Rāya Vaidya
  - Tantrasāra of Kṛṣṇānanda āgamvāgiśa
- Nibandha - handbooks on ritual worship, sadhana and puja
  - Kriyākalpataru of śaktinātha Kalyānakara
  - Kaulāvalīnirṇaya of Jñānānandagiri Paramahaṃsa
  - śāktanandataraṃgiṇī of Brahmānanda Giri
  - śāktakrama of Pūrṇānanda
  - śrītattvacintāmaṇi of Pūrṇānanda
  - āgamakalpadruma of Govinda
  - āgamakalpalatikā of Yadunātha
  - āgamatattvavilāsa of Raghunātha Tarkavāgīśa, and āgamachandrikā of Rāmakṛṣṇa
  - Tantrachintāmaṇi of Navamīsiṃha
  - Prāṇatoṣiṇī of Rāmatoṣaṇa Vidyālaṃkāra
  - Śhivarahasya
  - Śaivakalpadruma
- Ganapatya tantras
- Others – supernatural, chemistry, astrology, alchemy, etc.,

=== Translations ===
Most Hindu Tantras remain untranslated. One widely translated exception is the Vijñāna Bhairava Tantra, which according to Christopher Wallis, is atypical of most Tantric scriptures.

Sir John Woodroffe translated the Tantra of the Great Liberation (Mahānirvāna Tantra) (1913) into English along with other Tantric texts. Other tantras which have been translated into a Western language include the Malini-vijayottara tantra, the Kirana tantra, and the Parakhya Tantra.

Some translation of Tantra texts

1. The Kulachudamani Tantra and Vamkehwar Tantra, Louise M. Finn
2. Kularnava Tantra, Paramhansa Mishra
3. Kularnava Tantra, Ram Rahim Rai
4. Yogini Hridaya, Vraj Vallabh Dwivedi
5. Yogini Tantra by GangaVishnu ShriKrishnadas
6. Maheshwar Tantra Sarala Hindi Vyakhya Sudhakar Malaviya Chowkambha (Narada Pancrata)
7. Kamratna Tantra, Hemchandra Goswami

Tantric Texts Series Arthur Avalon (John Woodroffe)

1. Tantrabhidhanam with Bijanighantu & Mudranighantu - A Tantric Dictionary
2. Shatchakranirupanam (Serpant Power) with 2 commentaries - Taranatha Vaidyaratna
3. Prapachasaratantram (reprinted as volumes 18 & 19)
4. Kulachudamani Tantra - Girish Chandra Vedantatirtha
5. Kularnavatantram edited by Taranatha Vaidyaratna
6. Kalivilasatantram edited by Parvati Charana Tarkatirtha
7. Shrichakrasambhara edited by Kazi Dawa samdup (Buddhist Tantra)
8. Tantraraja Part 1 commentary by Subhagananda Natha
9. Karpuradistotra with intro & commentary by Vimalananda Swami
10. Kamakalavilasa of Punyananda, commentary by Natananadanatha
11. Kaula & Other Upanishads with commentaries by Bhaskararaya & others
12. Tantraraja Part 2 commentary by Subhagananda Natha
13. Mahanirvanatantram with commentary of Hariharananda Bharati
14. Kaulavalinirnayah of Jnanananda Paramahamsa
15. Brahmasamhita with commentary of Jiva Gosvami & Vishnusahasranama
16. Sharadatilakatantram of Lakshmana Desikendra with commentary Part 1
17. Sharadatilakatantram of Lakshmana Desikendra with commentary Part 2
18. Prapachasaratantram Part 1
19. Prapachasaratantram Part 2
20. Chidgaganachandrika - Swami Trivikrama Tirtha
21. Tarabhakti Sudharnava - Panchanana Bhattacharya Tarkaratna
22. Sataratna samgraha, with Sataratnollekhani - Edited by Panchanan Sastri

== See also ==
- History of Shaktism
