= Ahirbudhnya Samhita =

Hindu Pancharatra text

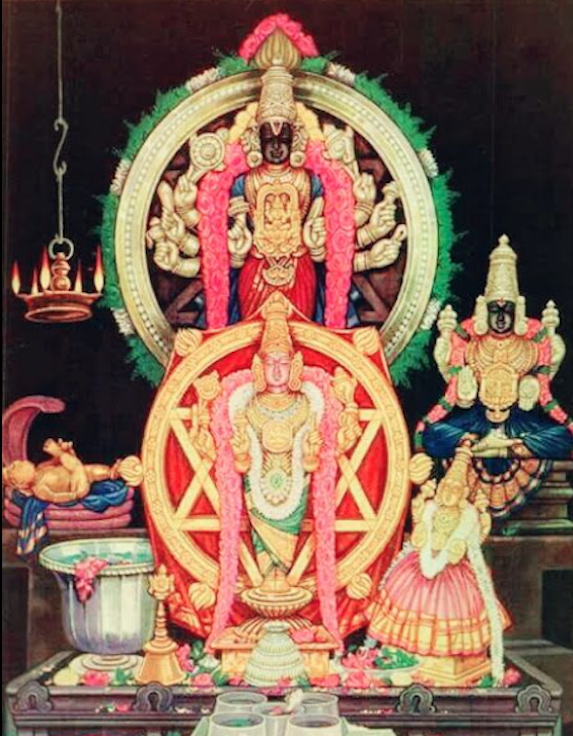
Artistic representation of the Sudarshana Chakra, who is one of the main deities of the book.

The Ahirbudhnya Samhita (Sanskrit: अहिर्बुध्न्यसंहिता, romanized: Ahirbudhnyasaṃhitā) is a Hindu Vaishnava text belonging to the Pancharatra tradition. It is a Tantrika composition, composed possibly over several centuries within the 1st millennium CE, most probably at 200 CE. Ahirbudhnya Saṃhita literally means a compendium (samhita) of the serpent-from-the-depths (from ahi for serpent and budhna for bottom/root). It is now practically extinct, with a few remnants preserved in southern India, though it was once recorded to be present in diverse places, including Kashmir, Orissa, Tamil Nadu, Kerala and Karnataka.

== Description ==
=== Characteristics ===
In the Ahirbudhnya Samhita, Vishnu emanated in 39 different forms. The Samhita is characteristic for its concept of Sudarshana. It provides mantras for Shakti and Sudarshana, and details the method of worship of the multi-armed Sudarshana. Its chapters include explanations on the origin of astras (weapons), anga (mantras), Vyuhas, sounds, and diseases, how to make Sudarshana Purusha appear, how to resist divine weapons and black magic, and provides method for making and worshipping the Sudarshana Yantra. The Ahirbudhnya Samhita is the source of Taraka Mantra, Narasimhanustubha Mantra, three occult alphabets, Sashtitantra and select astra mantras. It also mentions the Purusha Sukta. The four Vyuhas in this samhita are Vasudeva, Samkarshana, Pradyumna and Aniruddha.

As with other samhitas, Ahirbudhnya provides its views on creation, siddhantas, senses, bondage and liberation, and rationale of avatars. There are compositions on rakshas, yantras and yoga. It mentions castes and periods of life, interdependence of two higher castes, and provides its characterization of the ideal purohita, the Mahashanti Karman. Besides the story of Madhu and Kaitabha, the Ahirbudhnya details stories of nine personages, namely, Manishekhara, Kasiraja, Shrutakirti, Kushadhvaja, Muktapida, Vishala, Sunanda, Chitrashekhara, and Kirtimalin.

Another characteristic of the Ahirbudhayna Samhita is that it parallels descriptions of philosophical systems found in the Mokshadharma in which Samkhya is mentioned with four other systems, that is, Vedas, Yoga, Pancharatra (satvata) and Pashupata. The Sashtitantra of Ahirbudhnya is close to the Samkhya representation of brahman as the ultimate principle, shakti as synonym for prakriti, with a prominent description of kala (time). A note on yoga is attributed to Hiranyagarbha, who in Shvetashvatara Upanishad is identified with Kapila, though Ahirbudhnya itself makes no such identification. Another feature of the Ahirbudhnya is that the opening line of Yogasutra appears in the Sashtitantra of Ahirbudhnya. The Ahirbudhnya Samhita describes Kundalini yoga with its chakras.

=== Concept of varna ===
In the Ahirbudhnya concept of varna, in the Satya Yuga, a pure group descends from Pradyumna. and a mixed group from Aniruddha and Brahman. However, Manus pass from Pradyumna's care to Aniruddha, with their withdrawal into Aniruddha accompanied by pralaya. The pure beings are Anagamins and Sakrdagamins of Buddhism who owing to their advanced stage of liberation return for one or two lives only. At the end of Satya Yuga, Manu's descendants begin to deteriorate; while the Brahman are filled with better ones among the mixed specimen, until the Kali Yuga when reincarnation becomes possible for everyone. The 400 manavas of Ahirbudhnya become 800 Vishnus of Mahasanatkumara Samhita each of whom is a chieftain (nayaka) of 1000 subjects each, located in 8 regions. But among the 800 Vishnus there are only 300 twice-born manavas, while the original group of Shudras are replaced by 5 mixed groups to eliminate Shudra males altogether. Names are given for each loka having descendants from permutations between mothers and fathers of all four varnas, with the samhita noting that innumerable Vishnus reside in Kapila-loka. Notably, the text positions Anagamins and Sakrdagamins of Buddhism as descendants of Pradyumna.

=== Philosophy ===
Schrader notes the general trend of Pancharatra is non-Advaitic. Though a verse is found in the Padma Tantra where Vishnu says to Brahman that there is no difference between Vishnu and the liberated soul, pluralism is maintained with Vishnu reinstating that "liberated souls become like me except for governance of the world". While Lakshmi Tantra puts Shri at par with Vishnu, the Ahirbudhnya Samhita puts forth an ambivalent position where Vishnu and his shakti are inseparable, yet not equal. The Ahirbudhnya recognizes one of the eleven Rudras; that is Shiva himself in his Satvik form, in the form of a teacher. In the Veda ahi budhna (serpent of the bottom) is an atmospheric god who Schrader says merged with Rudra-Siva (Pashupati); with Ahi Budhanya in later vedic texts connected to Agni Grahapatya, suggesting this was a benevolent being and not the malevolent Ahi Vritra. Ahirbudhnya and Aja-Ekapada had their share of allocated ghriya (Grihyasutra) rituals. In later puranic literature, Ahirbudhnaya becomes one of the 11 Rudras.

Ahirbudhnya Samhita was a Bhagavata text, in which the conceptions of Sudarshana as Ayudhapurusha and Chakravartin were invoked. As per the Samhita, a king who worships Chakravarti inside the Sudarshana Chakra attains the Chakravartin rank; a new concept, which according to VS Agarwal, which helped the Bhagavatas to use religious tenets in influencing political thought and state.

The Ahirbudhnya Samhita is one of the Pancaratra samhitas with the most coverage of yoga. The text contains inconsistent teachings on kuṇḍalinī. In some sections kuṇḍalinī is described as a blockage that prevents prāṇa from entering the suṣumnā and rising. This is consistent with the teachings of T. Krishnamacharya, the 20th century yoga teacher. However, in other sections kuṇḍalinī is described as rising to the throat in the production of sounds.

== Extinct samhitas ==
In the 12th chapter of Ahirbudhnya Samhita, 10 Samhitas are mentioned, namely Bhagavat Samhita, Vidya Samhita, Karma Samhita, and seven other samhitas all of which are now extinct (non-surviving). Additionally, tantras mentioned in Ahirbudhnya such as Pati tantra, Pasu tantra, Pasa tantra from the Satvata and Pashupata religion are also extinct; though the Sattvata Samhita survives. A small portion of Ahirbudhnya Samhita is available in Telugu.

=== Inaccessible samhitas ===
Among the inaccessible (not easily available) samhitas of Pancharatra, documented by Schrader for surviving copies found in different places are:

- Kapinjala Samhita (in Telugu from Thirukkovalur)
- Parashara Samhita (in Telugu from Bangalore)
- Brihad Brahma Samhita (in Telugu from Thirupati)
- Bharadvaja Samhita (in Telugu from Mysore)
- Vishnutilaka (in Telugu from Bangalore)
- Sriprasna Samhita (in Grantha from Kumbakonam)
- Sattvata Samhita (in Devanagari from Conjeevaram).

== See also ==
- Tantras
- Tantra
- Agama
- Lakshmi Tantra
- Sri Yantra
