= Parashakti =

Goddess in Shaivism

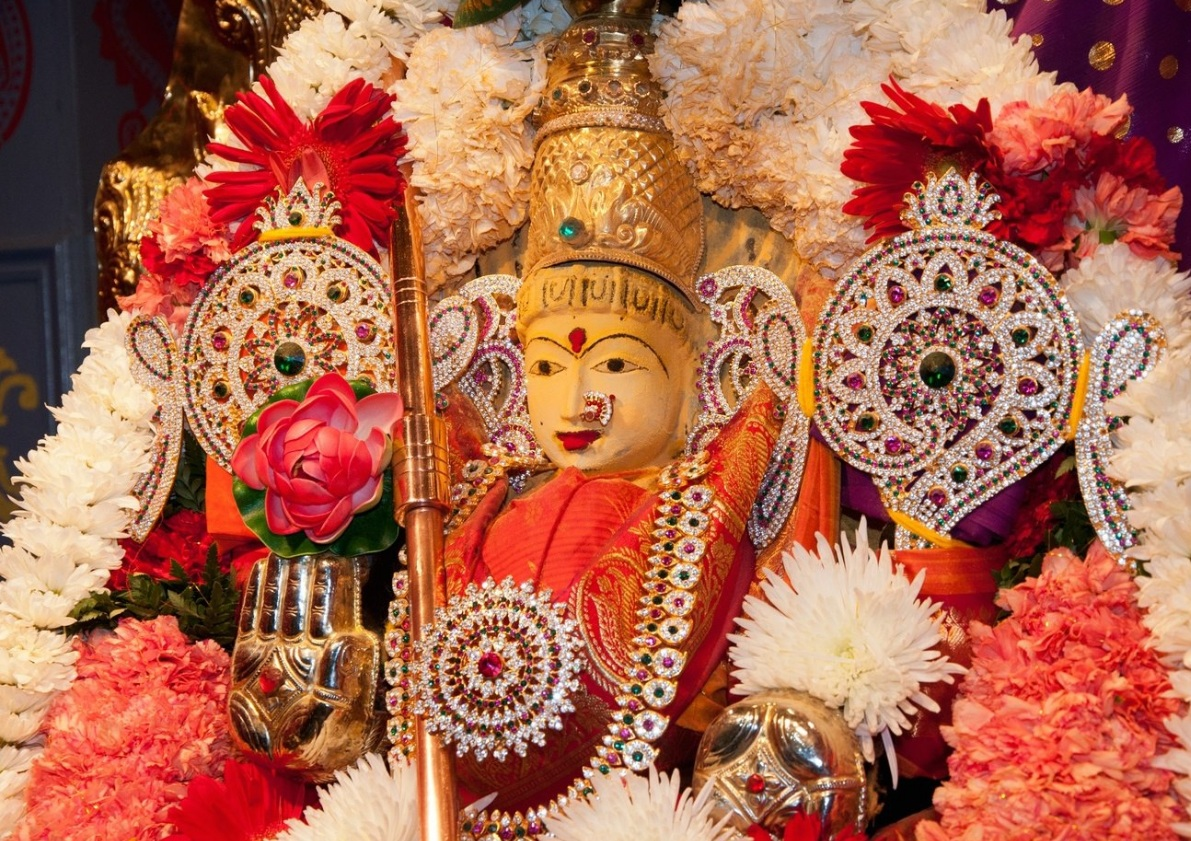
Parashakti murti in a temple.

Parashakti (IAST: Paraśakti, Sanskrit: पराशक्ति) or Parā refers to Shakti in her unmanifest state before manifesting in the physical realm.

In Siddhantic perspective, Parashakti is the counterpart of Paramshiva—an epithet for the ultimate form of Shiva in Shaiva Siddhanta and Kashmiri Shaivism. Parashakti is the power of this primordial Shiva, and is emanated from him.

In the Trika system of Kashmir Shaivism, Parashakti is one of the three chief goddesses along with Aparā and Parparā. Parashakti is the supreme being in puranic Shaktism and Shri Vidya traditions.

Trishulabja Yantra used in Trika worship, Parashakti symbolizes central prong of Trident

== Parā in Trika ==
Trika is a Non-Saiddhantic Mantra Margic Saivite sect that praises Parā, Aparā, and Parāparā as three supreme goddesses. These three represent the three prongs of Shiva's Trishula and they can be meditated upon in the Trishulabja Mandala. The three aspects emerge from Kulesvari Matrrusadbhava. Para means the highest form, beyond the range of human understanding. When it loses its transcendence and manifests, it becomes Parapara, the mediocre level. When it further loses its strength, it becomes Apara. These three aspects symbolize Shiva, Shakti and Atman in the philosophical perspective of Trika.

== Para in Siddhanta ==
According to Saiva Siddhanta, the lower part (pedestal) of Shiva lingam represents parashakti while upper part (oval stone) represents parashiva.

== Para in Shaktism ==
In Shaktism, Mahadevi (also known as Adi Parashakti) is considered the ultimate reality from which all gods and goddesses stem, with Shakti being one of her primary forms.

== See also ==
- Paramashiva
- Trika
- Adi parashakti
