= Rudrayamala =

Sanskrit Tantric text

Rudrayāmala Tantra
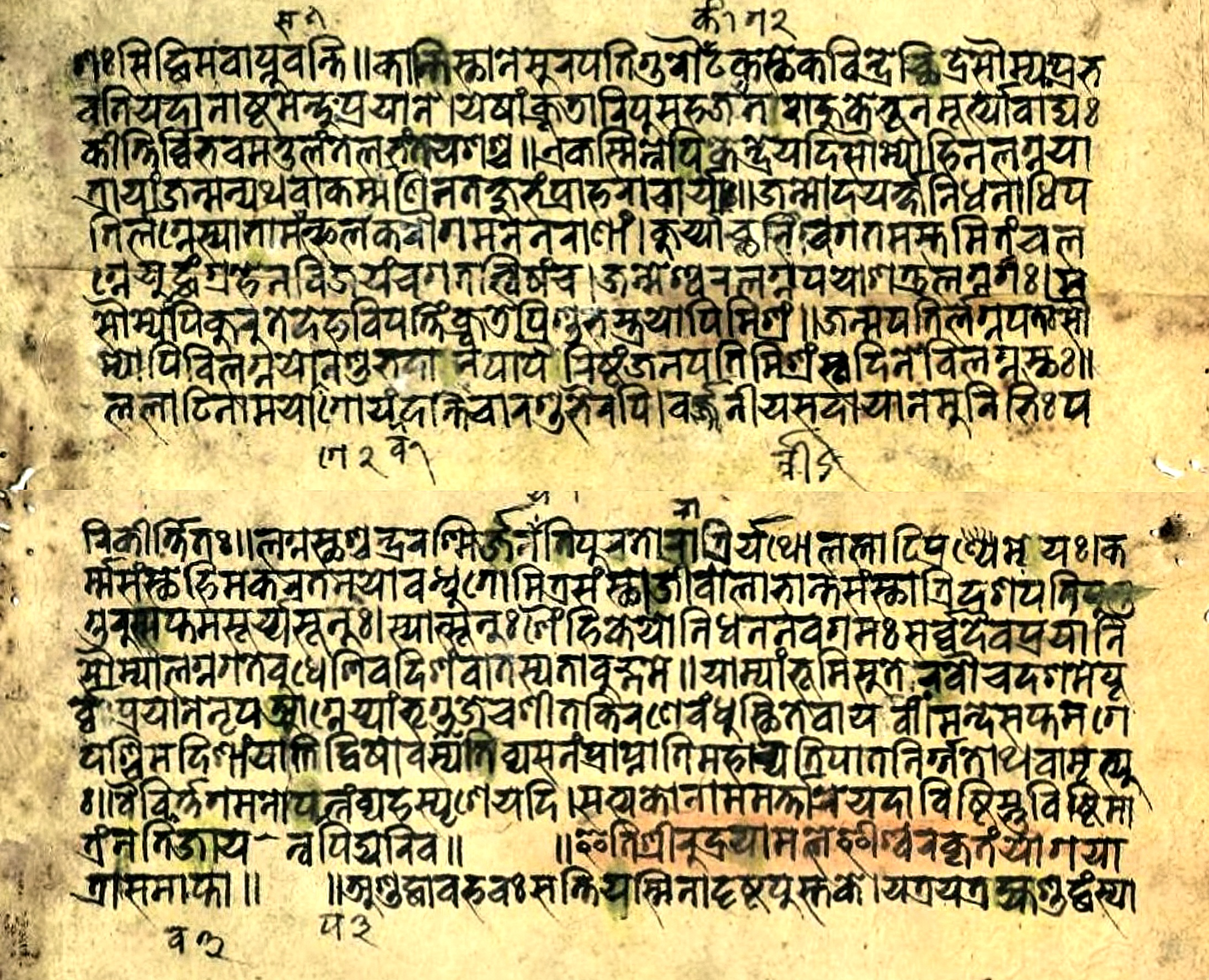
- Manuscript of Rudrayāmala written in Newar script from Nepal

Information
- Religion: Hinduism (Tantra, Shaktism)
- Author: Unknown (traditionally attributed to Shiva)
- Language: Sanskrit
- Period: Unknown

The Rudrayamala (Sanskrit: रुद्रयामल; IAST: Rudrayāmala) also known as Rudra Yamala, Rudrayāmala Tantra, Rudra-Yamala, or Parātriṁśaka, is considered one of the most important Sanskrit Tantric texts. It is divided into 64 chapters. Though its exact date of composition is unknown.

== Initiation and rituals ==
A section of the text known as the Rudrayāmala-Uttaratantra outlines specific prohibitions regarding who can initiate whom into spiritual mantras. It states that a husband should not initiate his wife, a father should not initiate his children, and a man should not initiate his brother. These strict rules reflect an older tradition of Tantrism that was later relaxed or abolished by newer texts such as the Mahānirvāṇatantra.

== Goddess Tara ==
It records that the Vāmācāra (left-hand path) practices associated with Devi Tara's worship were introduced by the sage Vashistha, who reportedly received his instructions directly from the Buddha. Additionally, the text details the iconography of the goddess Ugra-Tara, highlighting similarities between Tara and the goddess Kali; it notes that both deities are depicted standing upon a supine, corpse-like Shiva.

== Alchemy and science ==
Beyond theology and rituals, the Rudrayāmala Tantra contains a section dedicated to mercury and early alchemy known as the Rasārṇava-kalpa. Recognizing its historical value to Indian science, the National Commission for History of Science published an English translation of this specific section.
