= Parameshvara (epithet) =

Hindu epithet

Raghuvaṃśa: Canto 1; Verse 1

“For mastery of word and meaning I venerate the parents of the world, who are entwined together like word and meaning: Parvati and Parameshvara.”

Parameshvara (IAST: Parameśvara, Sanskrit: परमेश्वर) is an epithet used in Hindu literature. The term usually indicates the Supreme Being and Supreme Reality in Hinduism. Vaishnavas consider Vishnu and his avatars such as Rama and Krishna as Parameshvara, while Shaivas consider Shiva as Parameshvara. Parameshvara is the ultimate and highest reality that eternally pervades all matter for Hindus. He is regarded by devotees to be totality itself, controlling the triple forces of creation, preservation, and destruction.

== Etymology ==
The word is a compound of the Sanskrit words परम meaning 'Supreme' and ईश्वर meaning 'Lord'. Thus Parameshvara literally means 'highest supreme ruler'. Sometimes, other traditions of Hinduism such as Vedanta and Vaishnavism also use the term Parameshwara as a synonym of Parabrahman within their philosophical perspectives.

== Vaishnavism ==
In Vaishnavism traditions, Vishnu is considered as Parameshvara, Maheshwara, and Narayana. Vaishnavas consider Vishnu and his avatars such as Rama, Krishna etc., as the progenitor of Brahma and Shiva as said in many scriptures such as Bhagavata Purana, Vishnu Purana, Padma Purana, Pancharatra Agamas, Vaikhanasa Agamas and many more. In Pārameśvarasaṃhitā, a Vaishnava Pancharatra Agama text of Hinduism Vishnu (Narayana) is revered and worshipped as Parameshvara. Uttaranarayana (a continuation of the Purusha Sukta in the Shukla Yajurveda) also refers to God as Parameshvara with two consorts Sri and Bhu. Bhagavad Gita praises Krishna as Parameshvara (Highest God) in many contexts. In Vishnu Sahasranama, Parameshvara is 377th name of Vishnu.

== Shaivism ==
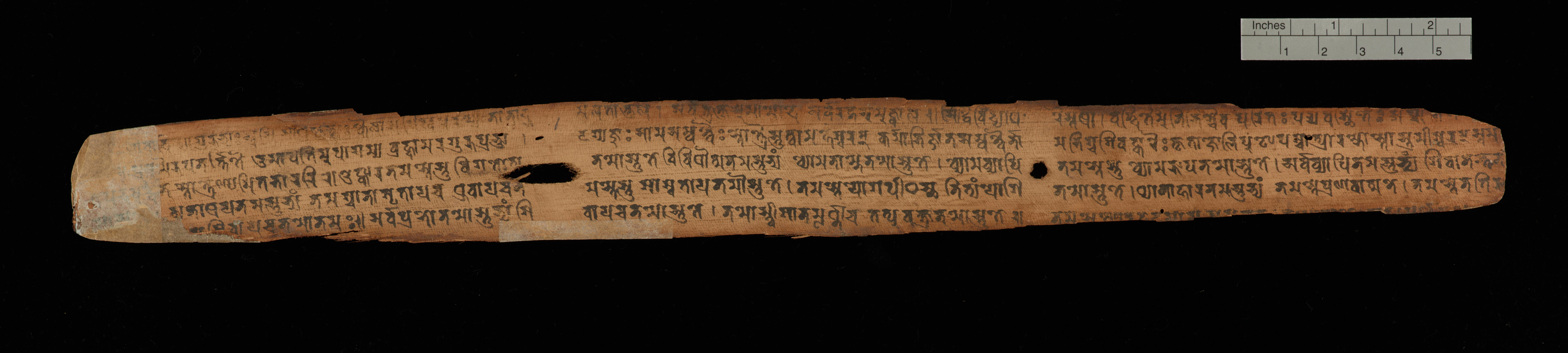
One of the oldest known dated Sanskrit manuscripts from South Asia, this specimen transmits a substantial portion of Pārameśvaratantra, a scripture of the Shaiva Siddhanta, that sought the worship of Shiva as Pārameśvara. No other complete manuscript of this work is known. A note in the manuscript states that it was copied in the year 252, which some scholars judge to be of the era established by the Nepalese king Amśuvaran, therefore corresponding to 828 CE. Cambridge University Library

Shaiva Siddhanta accepts the existence of Tripathartham (three entities), pati (the supreme being Paramashiva), pashu (all atmans) and pasam (three bondages of Anava, Karma, Maya). As the supreme being, Parameshvara only has the distinct eight characters or predicates which are applied to distinguish him from the other two entities of Shaiva Siddhanta—Pashu and Pasam. They are sarvajnatva (who knows everything), nityatrptatva (with infinite happiness), anādibōdha (without bondages), Svatantratva (independent), aluptashakti (unlimited mercy), anantashakti (unrestricted grace), nirāmayatma (wholesome) and Visuddhadēha (with pure body).

Shaiva Siddhanta states that Parameshvara is in two states: tatasta lakshanam, the form of lord that is moving through 36 tattvas; and Svarupa Lakshanam, the pure form of supreme being beyond everything. These two forms can be compared with the Saguna and Nirguna definitions of Para brahman in the Vedantic tradition. When he is defined with tatasta lakshanam, Paramashiva exists in nine divine forms, Brahma, Vishnu, Rudra, Maheshvara, Sadasiva, Shiva, Shakti, Nadam, and Bindhu in which he is beyond words in his last four formless manifestations known as Arupa. The first five are his manifestations with forms and known as rupa. Sadasiva is his mixed form of rupa and arupa which is often identified with lingam. Shiva and Shakti exist as inseparable Nada-bindu in the state of Svarupa Lakshanam in which they are often identified as the non-dual supreme being Paramashiva and Parashakti. Since they are inseparable and undifferentiated, Shaiva Siddhanta sees them as single oneness, Parameshvara.

== See also ==
- Mahadevi
- Mahavishnu
- Parashiva
- Purushottama
- Sadashiva
