= Netra Tantra =

Netra Tantra (Tantra of [Lord of] Eye) is a Tantra text attributed to non-Saiddhantika Mantra margic sect of Shaivism produced between circa 700 - 850 CE in Kashmir. It was commented on by the Kashmiri Saivite Pratyabhijñā philosopher Kshemaraja (c. 1000–1050) and it was connected with royalty and used in the courts by Śaiva officiants in the role of royal priest (Rājapurohita).

Netra Tantra, which also has the names of Mrityujit and Amṛteśavidhāna, praises Shiva and Shakti as the supreme beings in the forms of Amṛteśvarabhairava and Amṛtalaksmī. Amrtesvara literally means god of Amrita, Ambrosia. Mrtyunjya might be the later development of this deity. Netra Tantra is divided into 22 adhikaras or chapters and they describe various aspects of worshipping Amrtesa. The work, divided into 22 adhikaras of uneven length, describing Shaktis of Amritesha, Diksha, Chakras in body, yoginis, bhutas and meditation hymns. Netra Tantra seems the mixture of many traditions within Saivism as well as other sects of Hinduism.
