= Sadashiva =

Aspect of Hindu god Shiva as the Supreme Being

- Para Brahman, the Supreme Being; Primordial - Ultimate Reality; God of Grace, Obscuration, Creation, Preservation, Destruction, Time
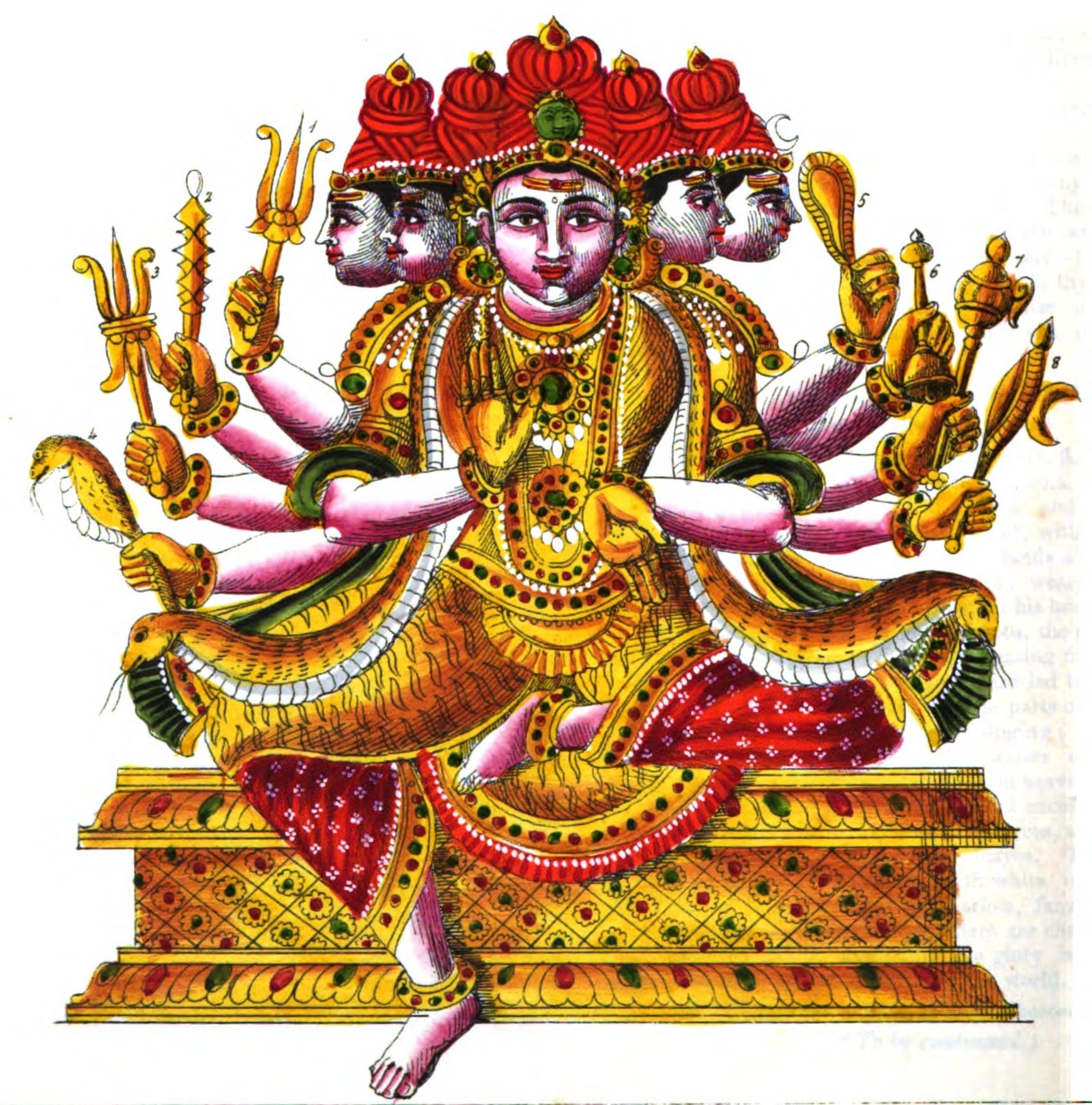
- Painting of Sadashiva from South India
- Affiliation: Parameshvara, Shiva, Rudra, Mahakala, Pashupati, Batara Guru
- Abode: Śāntyatīta, Mahākailāsa
- Mantra: Panchakshari mantra
- Weapon: Trishula (Trident)
- Symbols: Mukhalinga
- Consort: Adi Parashakti (according to Shaivism)

Sadashiva (Sanskrit: सदाशिव, Sadāśiva) is the Supreme Being in the Shaiva Siddhanta tradition of Hinduism. Sadashiva is the omnipotent, subtle, luminous absolute, the highest manifestation of Shiva. Sadashiva is believed to bestow anugraha and vilaya, or grace and obscuration of pasha, which are the fourth and fifth of the Panchakritya, or the "five holy acts" of Shiva. Sadashiva is usually depicted having five faces and ten hands, and is considered one of the 25 forms of Shiva. Shiva Agamas conclude that the lingam, especially the mukhalingamm, is another form of Sadashiva.

== Representation ==
The concept and form of Sadashiva initially emerged from south India, although many ancient sculptures of Sadashiva were obtained from various parts of India and Southeast Asia. It is believed that the cult of Sadashiva was widespread in the region of Bengal during the period of the Sena dynasty who traced their origin in South India. Sadashiva is usually represented in the form of a mukhalinga with the number of faces varying from one to five. The first ever sculpture of Sadashiva as a lingam with five faces was found in Bhita, near Prayagraj, and dates to the 2nd century CE. His five faces, Ishana, Tatpurusha, Vamadeva, Aghora, and Sadyojata are known as the panchabrahmas (five creators), the emanations towards the four directions and upwards from the nishkala (formless) Parashiva. Kamika Agama, the first Agama of 28 Shaiva Agamas depicts Sadashiva as having five faces and ten arms. His five right hands hold the trishula (trident), axe, katvanga, vajra, and display the abhayamudra, while his five left hands hold a snake, matulunga fruit, nilotpala, damaru, rudraksha rosary, and display the varadamudra. The consort of Sadashiva is the goddess Mahagayatri, a form of Parvati often known as Manonmani in Agamic texts. She is sometimes depicted having two arms and seated on the lap of Sadashiva.

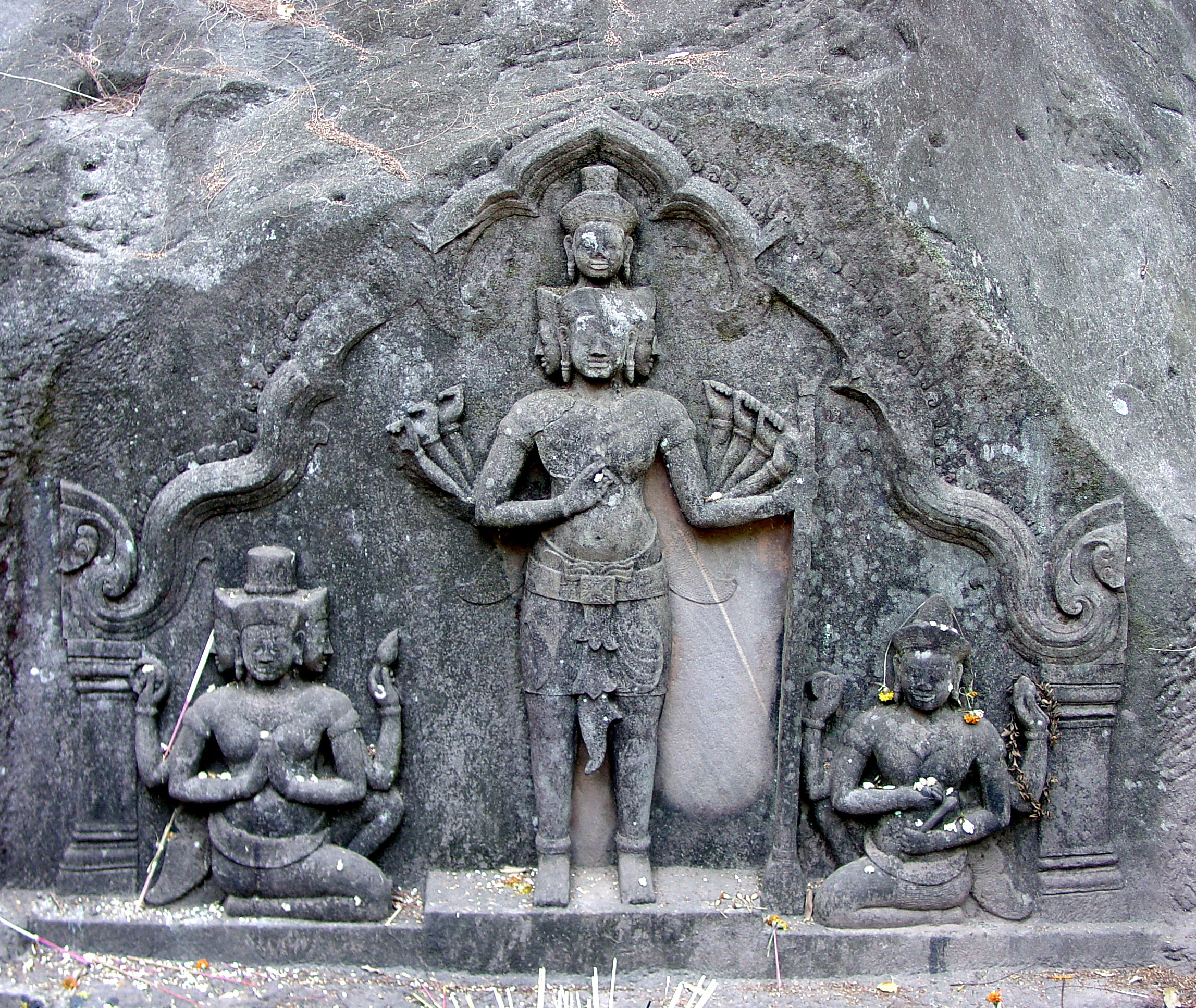
Sadashiva standing between Brahma and Vishnu. 10th c. CE sculpture at Vat Phou, Laos

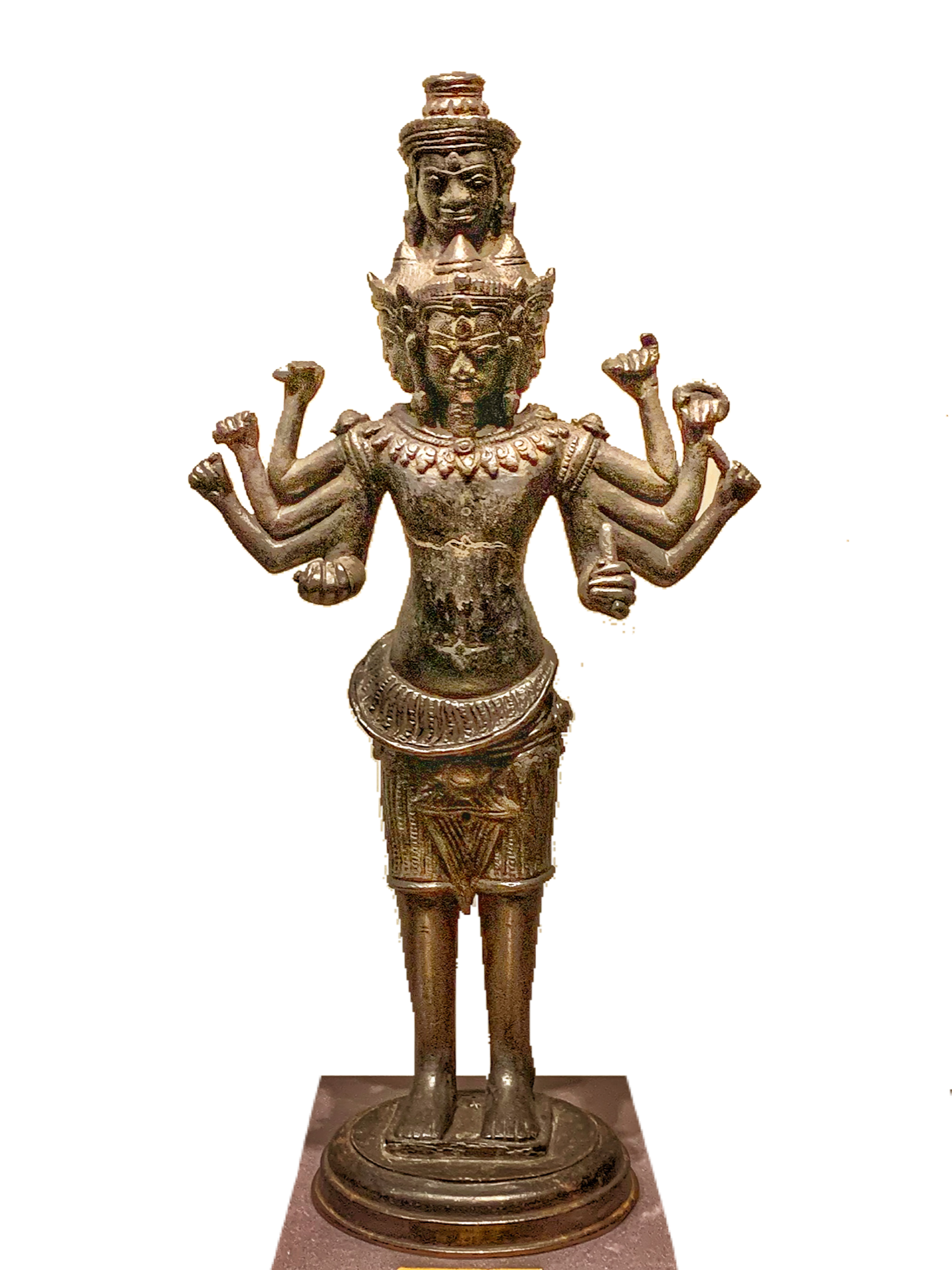
Murti of Sadashiva, Bangkok National Museum

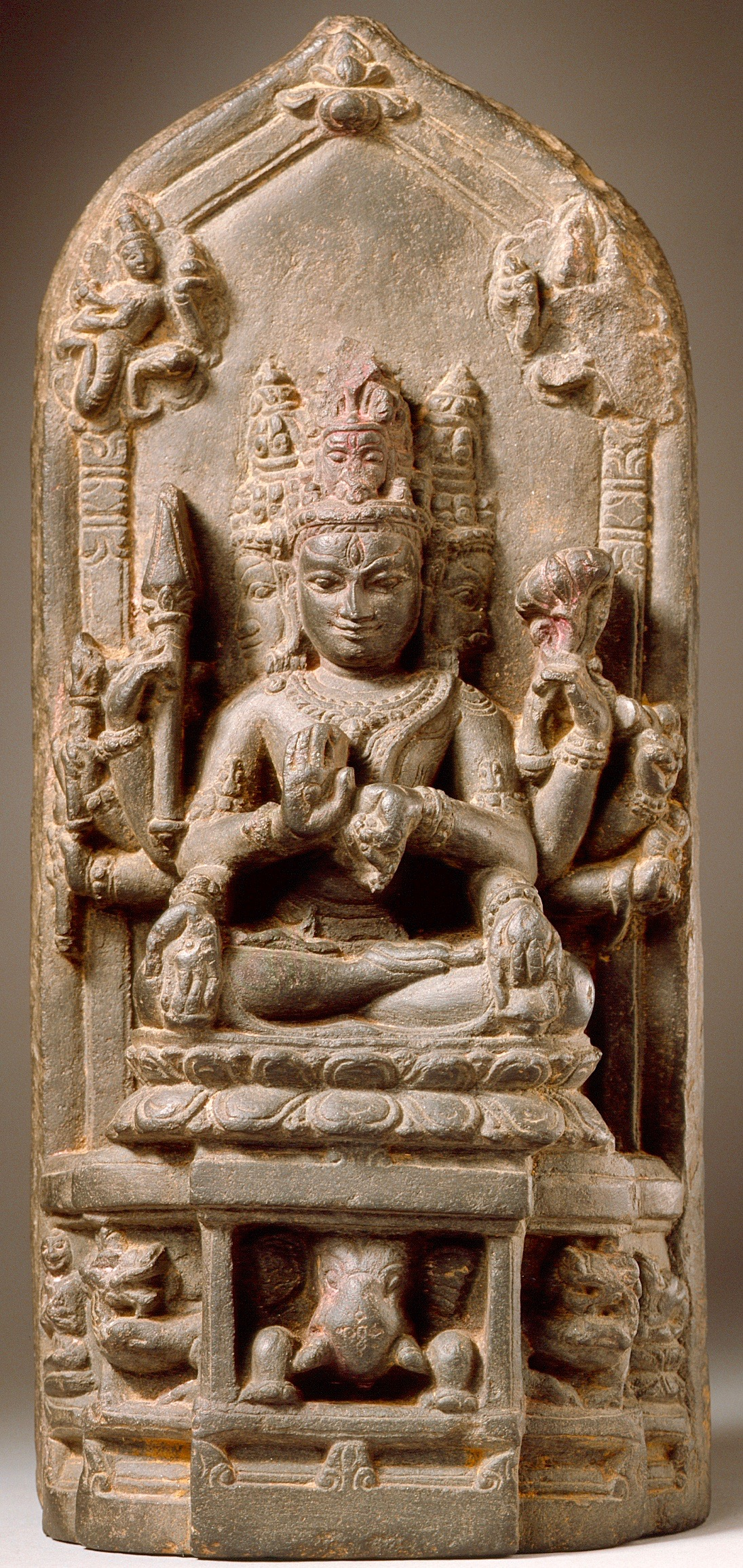
A sculpture of Sadasiva from West Bengal. 11th c. CE

== Panchabrahma ==
According to Shaivite texts, the supreme being Parashivam manifests as pentads, rather than the trinity of other Hindu sects - Brahma, Vishnu and Shiva. His five deeds, known "Panchakrityas" (five holy acts), are assigned to Panchamurti, his five aspects, viz., Brahma, Vishnu, Rudra, Mahesvara and Sadashiva (Mahesvara and Sadashiva are forms of Shiva, Rudra is also refers as Shiva ). Creation, Preservation, Destruction, Obscuration and Grace are done by these five manifestations respectively. The five faces of Parashiva which emanate these five aspects are praised as "Panchabrahmas", the five creators or the five realities). The Panchamurtis of Shaivism are absorbed within Shaktism and named as "Panchapreta" (five bodies).

=== Five faces ===
The five faces of Sadashiva are sometimes identified with Mahadeva, Parvati, Nandi, Bhairava and Sadashiva himself. The ten arms of Sadashiva represent the ten directions. Another variation of Sadashiva later evolved into another form of Shiva known as Mahasadasiva, in which Shiva is depicted with twenty-five heads with seventy-five eyes and fifty arms. Given accounts relating to Sadashiva are collected from Kamika Agamam and Vishnudharmottara Purana.
