= Mantra marga =

Mantramarga, literally "the path of mantras," is one of the two main paths of initiatory Shaivism, which a follower joins through a formal rite of initiation, rather than through lay temple worship. The Atimarga, the other path, is the older of the two, and sought only liberation. The Mantramarga admitted both ascetics and householders, offering the pursuit of powers (siddhis) in addition to liberation.

== History ==
Mantramarga, the tantric branch of initiatory Shaivism, emerged around the mid-first-millennium CE, several centuries after the Atimarga, according to Alexis Sanderson's dating.

It differed from the Atimarga branch, concerned exclusively with liberation, in that it mainly offered practitioners the choice to pursue siddhis, or powers, and the ability to enjoy pleasures (bhoga) in various cosmic realms. Ascetics were the principal seekers of powers, while liberation remained largely the concern of householders.

Its distinct focus on the pursuit of powers can be traced to the earliest compositional strata of the Mantramarga texts. While the developed Mantramarga placed distinctively tantric deities in the supreme position, in these earlier layers an older form of Rudra was instead at the foreground. The distinction between the two branches persists even at this early stage, however. The Atimarga's Rudra is "solitary and celibate," while the Rudra in early Mantramarga is associated with predominantly female spirits. Sanderson argues that these female spirits represent an early instance of a wider engagement with feminine power (sakti) in the Mantramarga that is absent from the "sakti-less Atimarga."

South Indian Agamas are believed to be composed no later than 5th century CE. "Nisvasa" series of Agamas has been composed initially in the Mantra margic treatise between 450 - 500 CE.

Mantra margic texts describe the construction of temples, ruling of the countries in Shaivite supervising, and social and spiritual responsibility in Shaivite perspectives. They swear reciting mantras can be used to control the thread of enemies and natural catastrophes. Mantra marga spread vigorously until the 11th century CE and cause the establishment of great empires even in south-east Asia such as Angkor Khmer Empire and Majapahit.

== Mantra marga schools ==
The Mantramarga's large extant scriptural corpus is divided into two: the Saiva Siddhanta, which is a clearly bounded canon, and the Tantras of Bhairava, a more heterogeneous body of texts in which feminine power and transgressive ritual are far more prominent.

Saiddhantika sect is South Indian Tamil Siddhantism. It praises Sadasiva as its supreme deity. Kirana, Kalottara and Mrigendra are the few agamas that emerged from North India though several sivagamas including Karana, Kamika has been produced in South land. The ritual for royal coronation explained in the siddhantic agamas indicate their significance among kings.

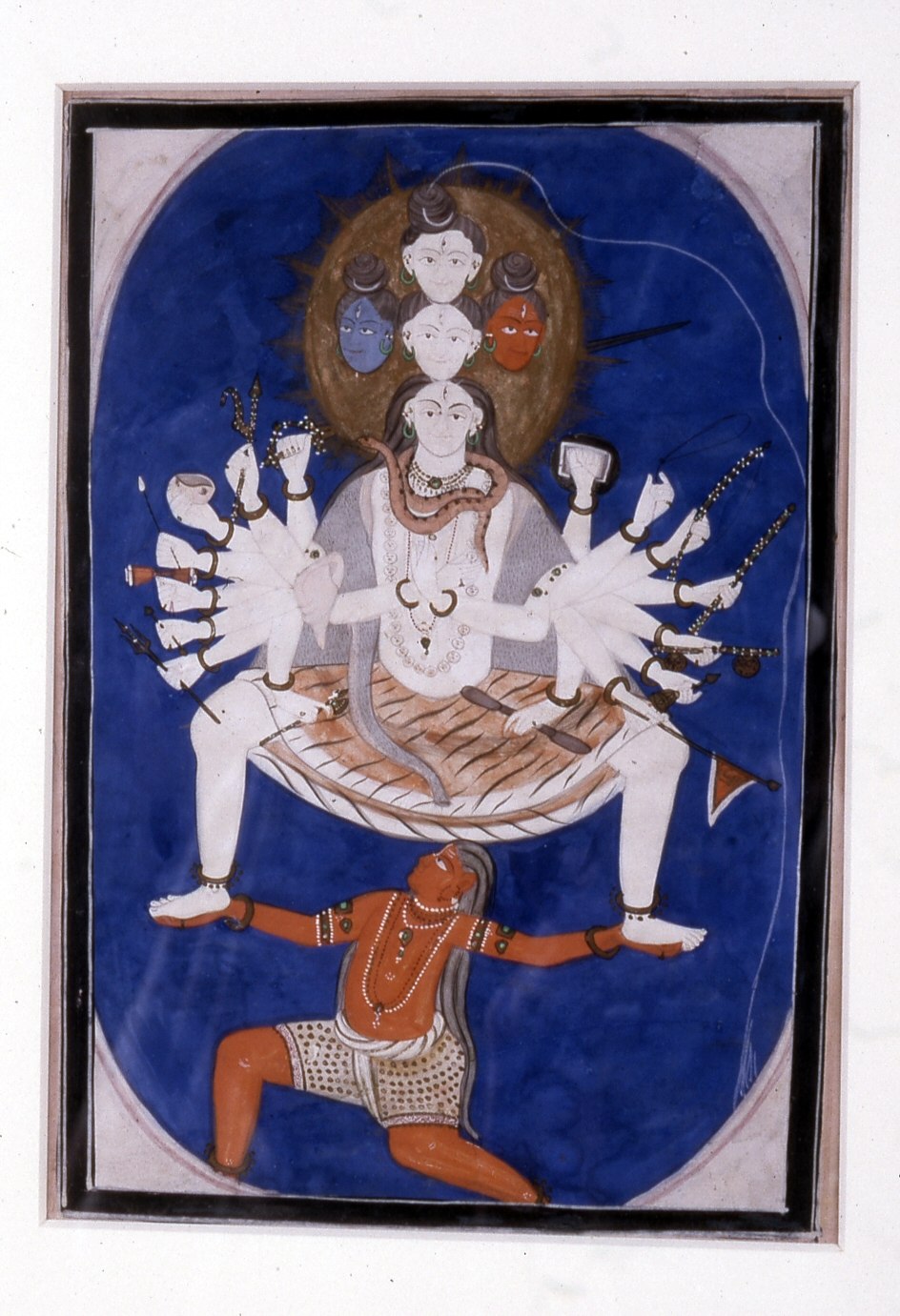
Svacchanda Bhairava, the supreme being of Dakshina Shaivism

Non - saiddhantika is a group of many sects worshiping Bhairava as their supreme deity. These sects are mostly identified today with Kashmir Shaivism. Researchers assume with the liturgical testimonies that the Shaktism could be developed from Non - saiddhantic mantra marga. Following list gives a brief introduction on Non - saiddhantika schools of Mantra margic Shaivism.

- Vama = Tumburu and his four sisters (Jayā, Vijayā, Ajitā, Aparājitā) are supreme.
- Dakṣiṇā = Svacchanda Bhairava and Aghoreśvarī.
- Yamala = Kapalesa Bhairava and chandakapalini.
- Netra = Amṛteśvara and Amṛteśvarī
- Trika = Mātṛsadbhāva and three goddesses - Parā, Aparā, Parāpa
- Kubjika = Kubjikā and Navatma Bhairava
- Kalikula = Kālasaṃkarṣiṇī
- Śrividyā = Tripura Sundarī

Sinchini Tantra explains that the last four sects are Shaktist branches. But Kubjika and Trika are considered as Shaivite sects nowadays.
