= Anava =

Hindu philosophical theory

Anava (Sanskrit: आणवा, romanized: āṇavā) (from "anu", meaning an atom or an exceedingly small entity) is a state - the consciousness of the ego, the sense of "I" and "mine". This represents a sense of individuality and a separation from a general existence of any "divine plan". One of the three bondages or pāśas: anava, karma and maya. In Shaivism, anava is the cause of the individual soul's mistaken sense of separate identity from Universal God Shiva, and the last bond broken before union (yoga) or self-realization (moksha). The three bondages are also explicitly discussed in the tantras of Shaktism.
