= Aṇḍa =

In Kaśmir Śaivism the world is described as being composed of four spheres (aṇḍa) that contain a series of phenomenal elements (tattva). The four aṇḍa are described to appear by the means of the internal abundance of Śiva's divine powers. Outside the four aṇḍa is Śiva tattva which is the substrate and essential nature of all the other tattvas.

== Śakti aṇḍa ==
Projected by the absolute, Śakti aṇḍa is the first step of creation. Also called the pure creation because at this level the divine nature of Śiva is not obscured, it manifests a state of diversity in unity. The divine powers (Śakti) gradually descend from Ānanda Śakti (bliss) to Icchā Śakti (the power of will), Jñāna Śakti (the power of knowledge) and Kriyā Śakti (the power of action), at the same time creating the basis for the dual creation. At this stage, though, the duality is only "in concept"; there is no actual division or limitation yet. This aṇḍa contains Śakti tattva, Sadāśiva tattva, Iśvara tattva and Śuddha-vidyā tattva (all the pure tattvas except the first one, Śiva tattva).

== Māyā aṇḍa ==
The sphere of Māyā causes the divine nature and purity that exists in Śakti aṇḍa to be forgotten. The divine creation is covered with five limitations (kañcuka) that make the infinite, eternal, perfect in itself, all knowing and all powerful nature of God, as manifested first in the Śakti Aṇḍa, appear limited in space (Niyati tattva) and time (Kāla tattva), incomplete (Rāga tattva), with limited knowledge (Aśuddha-vidyā tattva) and power of action (Kalā tattva). This aṇḍa contains seven tattvas, from Māyā tattva to Puruṣa tattva.

== Prakṛti aṇḍa ==
Prakṛti aṇḍa describes the world as it is perceived from the common human level of consciousness. It contains the śakti of the individual soul (puruṣa): Prakṛti tattva, the intellect (Buddhi tattva), the ego (Ahamkāra tattva), the sensory mind (Manas tattva), the five sense organs (Jñānendriya), the five organs of action (Karmendriya), the five subtle essences (Tanmātra) and the last four physical elements (Mahābhutā) : Ākāśa tattva, Vāyu tattva, Tejas tattva and Jala tattva.

== Pṛthvī aṇḍa ==
Pṛthvī aṇḍa is the terminal point of creation – solid matter. There is only one tattva in this sphere: Pṛthivi tattva. This tattva has a special statute because it contains in essence all the other tattvas and is the home of Kuṇḍalinī Śakti.

== See also ==
- The 36 tattvas
- Trika
- Turiya
