= Sudarshana Chakra =

Discus weapon used by Vishnu

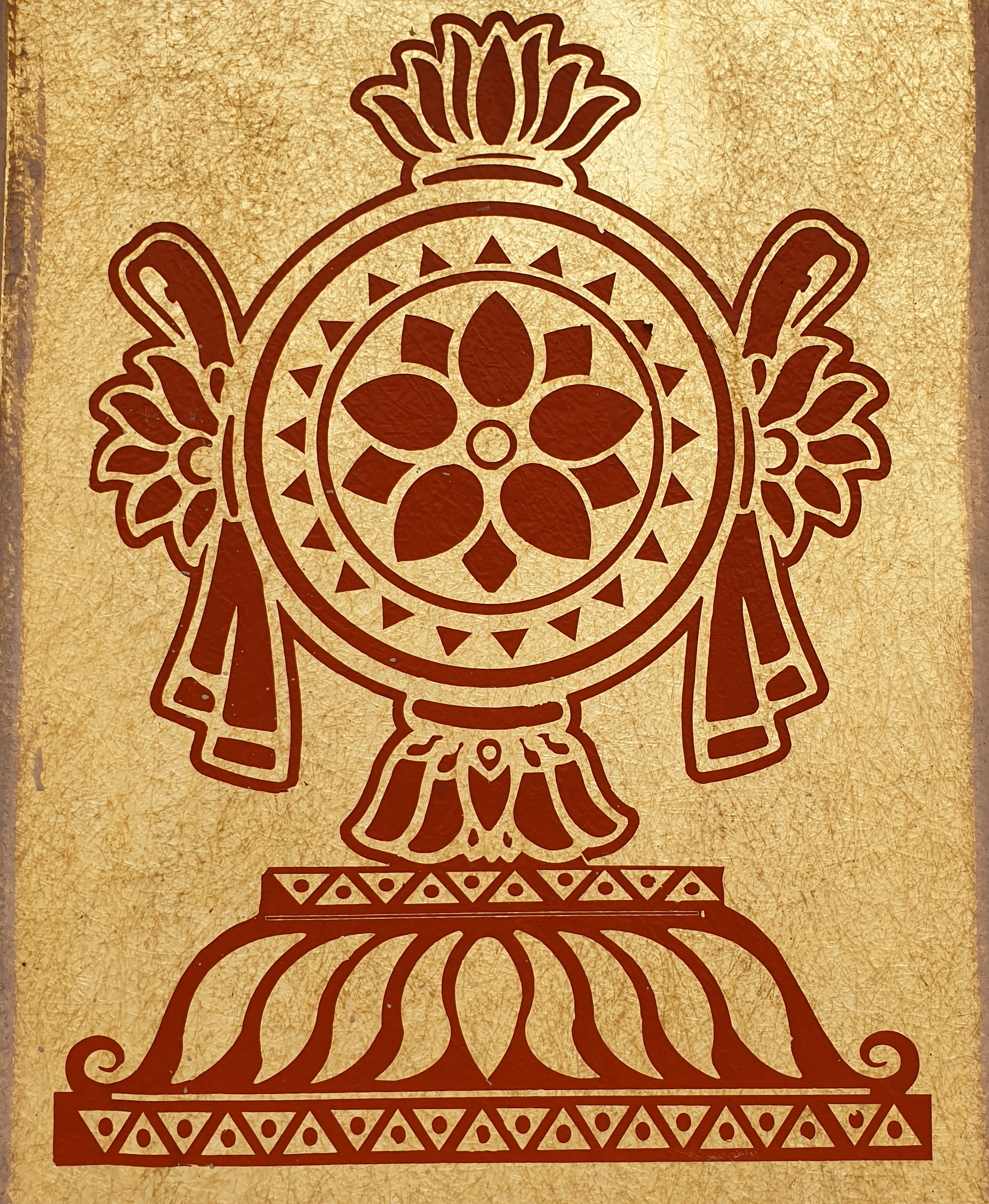
Iconography of the Sudarshana Chakra upon a temple wall

In Hindu mythology, the Sudarshana Chakra (Sanskrit: सुदर्शनचक्र) is a divine spinning disc, attributed to Vishnu. The Sudarshana Chakra is generally portrayed on the right rear hand of the four hands of Vishnu, who also holds the Panchajanya (conch), the Kaumodaki (mace), and the Padma (lotus).

In the Rigveda, the Sudarshana Chakra is stated to be Vishnu's symbol as the wheel of time. The disc later emerged as an ayudhapurusha (an anthropomorphic form), representing a fierce aspect of Vishnu, used for the destruction of demons. As an ayudhapurusha, the deity is known as Chakraperumal, Chakratalvar, Chakradhara, or Chakrapani.

In the Ramayana, Vishnu takes his seventh avatar Rama on the plea of devas, to kill Ravana. Sudarshana Chakra accompanies him (along with Shesha and Panchajanya) and takes the avatar of Shatrughna, Rama's youngest brother and Ayodhya's youngest prince. Shatrughna marries Shrutakirti, who is an avatar of Lakshmi's chakra.

== Etymology ==
The word Sudarshana is derived from two Sanskrit words – Su (सु) meaning "good/auspicious" and Darshana (दर्शन) meaning "vision". In the Monier-Williams dictionary the word Chakra is derived from the root क्रम् (kram) or ऋत् (rt) or क्रि (kri) and refers among many meanings, to the wheel of a carriage, wheel of the sun's chariot or metaphorically to the wheel of time. In Tamil, the Sudarshana Chakra is also known as Chakratalvar (disc-devotee).

== Literature ==
=== Rigveda ===
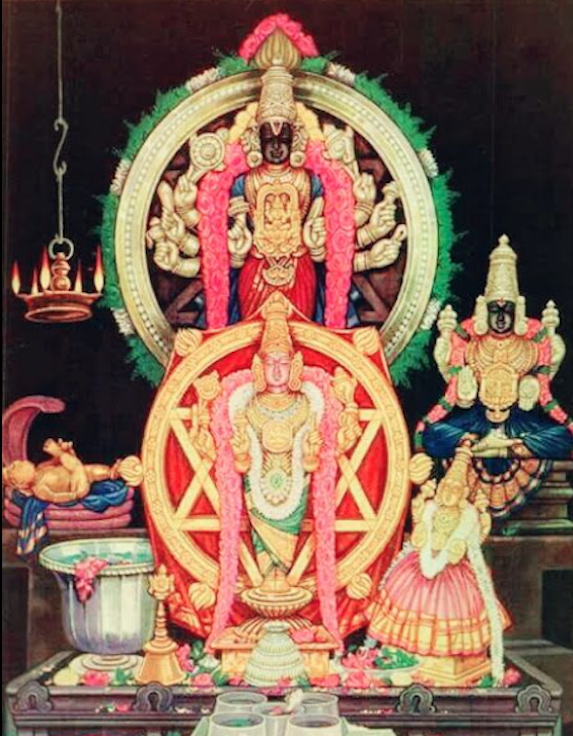
Artistic representation of Chakrapani Perumal worshiped in Tamil Nadu.

The Rigveda mentions the Sudarshana Chakra as a symbol of Vishnu, and as the wheel of time.

=== Mahabharata ===
The Mahabharata features the spinning disc as a weapon of Krishna, identified with Vishnu. The deity beheads Shishupala with the Sudarshana Chakra at the rajasuya yajna of Emperor Yudhishthira. He also employs it during the fourteenth day of the Kurukshetra War to obscure the sun. The Kauravas are deceived, allowing Arjuna to slay Jayadratha, avenging the death of his son.

=== Ramayana ===
The Ramayana states that the Sudarshana Chakra was created by the divine architect, Vishvakarma. Vishnu slays a danava named Hayagriva on top of a mountain named Chakravana, seizing the disc from him.

=== Ahirbudhnya Samhita ===
The Ahirbudhnya Samhita (Sanskrit: अहिर्बुध्न्यसंहिता, IAST: Ahiburdhnyasaṃhitā) is a Hindu Vaishnava text belonging to the Pancharatra tradition. It is a Tantrika composition, composed possibly over several centuries within the 1st millennium CE, most probably at 200 CE. Ahirbudhnya Saṃhita literally means a compendium (samhita) of the serpent-from-the-depths (from ahi for serpent and budhna for bottom/root).

In the Ahirbudhnya Samhita, Vishnu emanated in 39 different forms. The Samhita is characteristic for its concept of Sudarshana. It provides mantras for Sudarshana, and details the method of worship of the multi-armed Sudarshana. Its chapters include explanations on the origin of astras (weapons), anga (mantras), Vyuhas, sounds, and diseases, how to make Sudarshana Purusha appear, how to resist divine weapons and black magic, and provides method for making and worshipping the Sudarshana Yantra. The Ahirbudhnya Samhita is the source of Taraka Mantra, Narasimhanustubha Mantra, three occult alphabets, Sashtitantra and select astra mantras. It also mentions the Purusha Sukta. The four Vyuhas in this samhita are Vasudeva, Samkarshana, Pradyumna and Aniruddha.

=== Puranas ===
The Puranas also state the Sudarshana Chakra was made by Vishvakarma, featuring a legend regarding its origin: Vishvakarma's daughter, Sanjña, was married to the sun god, Surya. However, due to her consort's blazing light and heat, she could not approach him. When she informed her father regarding this, Vishvakarma diminished the brilliance of the sun so that his daughter could be with him. From the splendour of the Sun, Vishvakarma produced three divine objects: the aerial vehicle Pushpaka Vimana, the Trishula of Shiva, and the Sudarshana Chakra of Vishnu.

Following the self-immolation of Sati in the Daksha yajna, a grieving Shiva carried around her lifeless body, and was inconsolable. To liberate him from his anguish, Vishnu employed Sudarshana Chakra to cut the corpse of Sati into fifty-one pieces. The fifty-one parts of the goddess' body are believed to have scattered across the earth, venerated as the Shakta pithas.

Vishnu granted King Ambarisha the boon of the Sudarshana Chakra to reward him for his devotion.

The Sudarshana Chakra was also used to behead Rahu and cut the celestial Mandara mountain during the Samudra Manthana.

== Historical representations ==
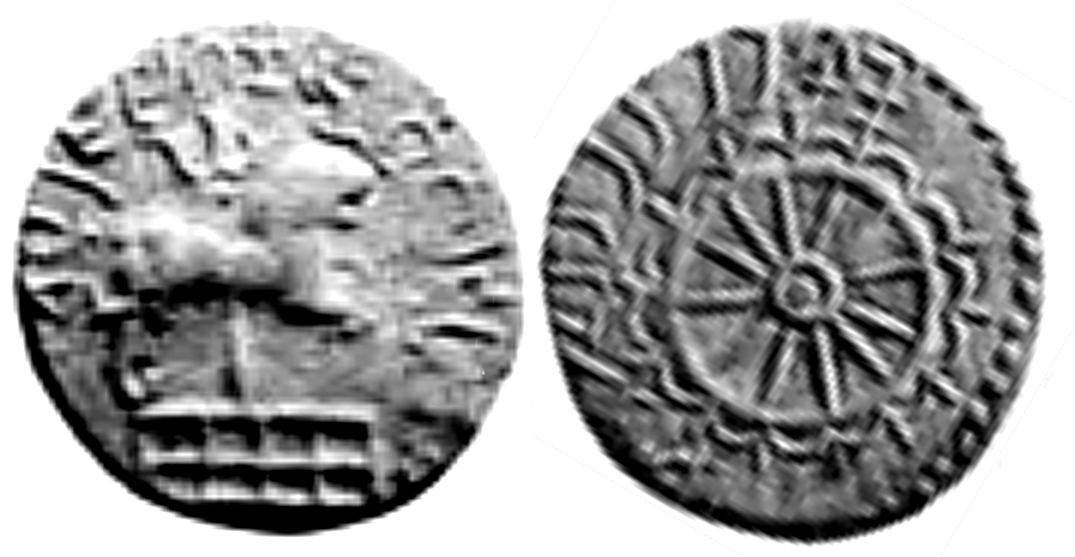
A Vrishni silver coin from Alexander Cunningham's Coins of Ancient India: From the Earliest Times Down to the Seventh Century (1891)

The chakra is found in the coins of many tribes with the word gana and the name of the tribe inscribed on them. Early historical evidence of the Sudarshana-Chakra is found in a rare tribal Vrishni silver coin with the legend Vṛishṇi-rājaṅṅya-gaṇasya-trātasya which P. L. Gupta thought was possibly jointly issued by the gana (tribal confederation) after the Vrishnis formed a confederation with the Rajanya tribe. However, there is no conclusive proof so far. Discovered by Cunningham, and currently placed in the British Museum, the silver coin is witness to the political existence of the Vrishnis. It is dated to around 1st century BCE. Vrishni copper coins dated to later time were found in Punjab. Another example of coins inscribed with the chakra are the Taxila coins of the 2nd century BCE with a sixteen-spoked wheel.

A coin dated to 180 BCE, with an image of Vasudeva-Krishna, was found in the Greco-Bactrian city of Ai-Khanoum in the Kunduz area of Afghanistan, minted by Agathocles of Bactria. In Nepal, Jaya Cakravartindra Malla of Kathmandu issued a coin with the chakra.

Among the only two types of Chakra-vikrama coins known so far, there is one gold coin in which Vishnu is depicted as the Chakra-purusha. Though Chandragupta II issued coins with the epithet vikrama, due to the presence of the kalpavriksha on the reverse it has not been possible to ascribe it to him.

== Anthropomorphic form ==
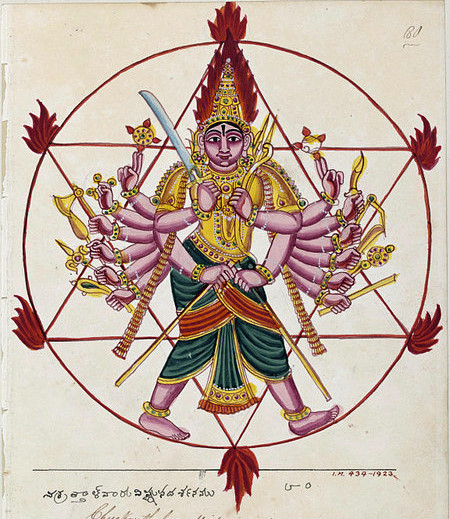
Sudarshana Chakra depicted as Chakratalvar who is an ayudhapurusha and a fierce aspect of his owner Vishnu

The anthropomorphic form of Sudarshana can be traced from discoid weapons of ancient India to his esoteric multi-armed images in the medieval period in which the Chakra served the supreme deity (Vishnu) as his faithful attendants. While the two-armed Chakra-Purusha was humanistic, the medieval multi-armed Sudarshana (known as Chakraperumal or Chakrathalvar) was speculatively regarded as an impersonal manifestation of destructive forces in the universe; that, in its final aspect, combined the flaming weapon and the wheel of time which destroys the universe.

The rise of Tantrism aided the development of the anthropomorphic personification of the chakra as the active aspect of Vishnu with few sculptures of the Pala era bearing witness to the development, with the chakra in this manner possibly associated with the Vrishnis. However, the worship of Sudarshana as a quasi-independent deity concentrated with the power of Vishnu in its entirety is a phenomenon of the southern part of India; with idols, texts and inscriptions surfacing from the 13th century onwards and increasing in large numbers only after the 15th century.

The Chakra Purusha in Pancharatra texts has either four, six, eight, sixteen, or thirty-two hands, with double-sided images of multi-armed Sudarshana on one side and Narasimha on other side (called Sudarshana-Narasimha in Pancharatra) within a circular rim, sometimes in dancing posture found in Gaya area datable to 6th and 8th centuries. Unique images of Chakra Purusha, one with Varaha in Rajgir possibly dating to the 7th century, and another from Aphsad (Bihar) detailing a fine personification dating to 672 CE have been found.

While the chakra is ancient, with the emergence of the anthropomorphic forms of chakra and shankha traceable in the north and east of India as the Chakra-Purusha and Shanka-Purusha; in the south of India, the Nayak period popularized the personified images of Sudarshana with the flames. In the Kilmavilangai cave is an archaic rock-cut structure in which an image of Vishnu has been hallowed out, holding the Shanka and Chakra, without flames. At this point, the Chakrapurusha with the flames had not been conceived in the south of India. The threat of invasions from the north was a national emergency during which the rulers sought out the Ahirbudhnya Samhita, which prescribes that the king should resolve the threat by making and worshiping images of Sudarshana.

Though similar motives contributed to the installation of images of Sudarshana during the Vijayanagara period, there was a wider distribution of the cult during the Nayak period, with Sudarshana's images set up in temples ranging from small, out-of-the-way temples to large temples of importance. Though political turmoil resulted in the disintegration of the Vijayanagara Empire, the construction and refurbishing of temples did not cease; with the Nayak period continuing with their architectural enterprises, which Begley and Nilakantha Sastri note "reflected the rulers' awareness of their responsibilities in the preservation and development of all that remained of Hinduism.

The worship of Sudarshana Chakra is found in the Vedic and in the tantric cults. In the Garuda purana, the chakra was also invoked in tantric rites. The tantric cult of Sudarshana was to empower the king to defeat his enemies in the shortest time possible. Sudarshana's hair, depicted as tongues of flames flaring high forming a nimbus, bordering the rim of the disc and surrounding the deity in a circle of rays (Prabha-mandala) are a depiction of the deity's destructive energy.

== Representation ==
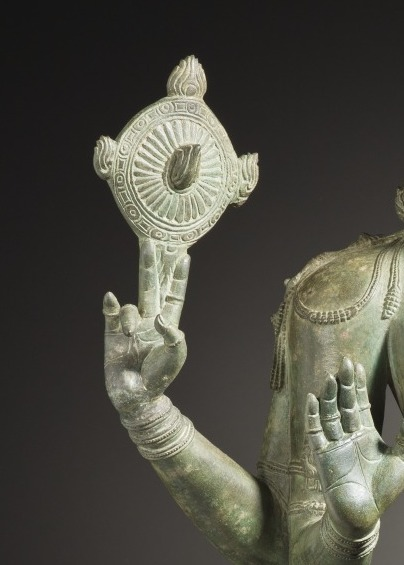
Chakra in a 13th-century-CE metal Vishnu icon

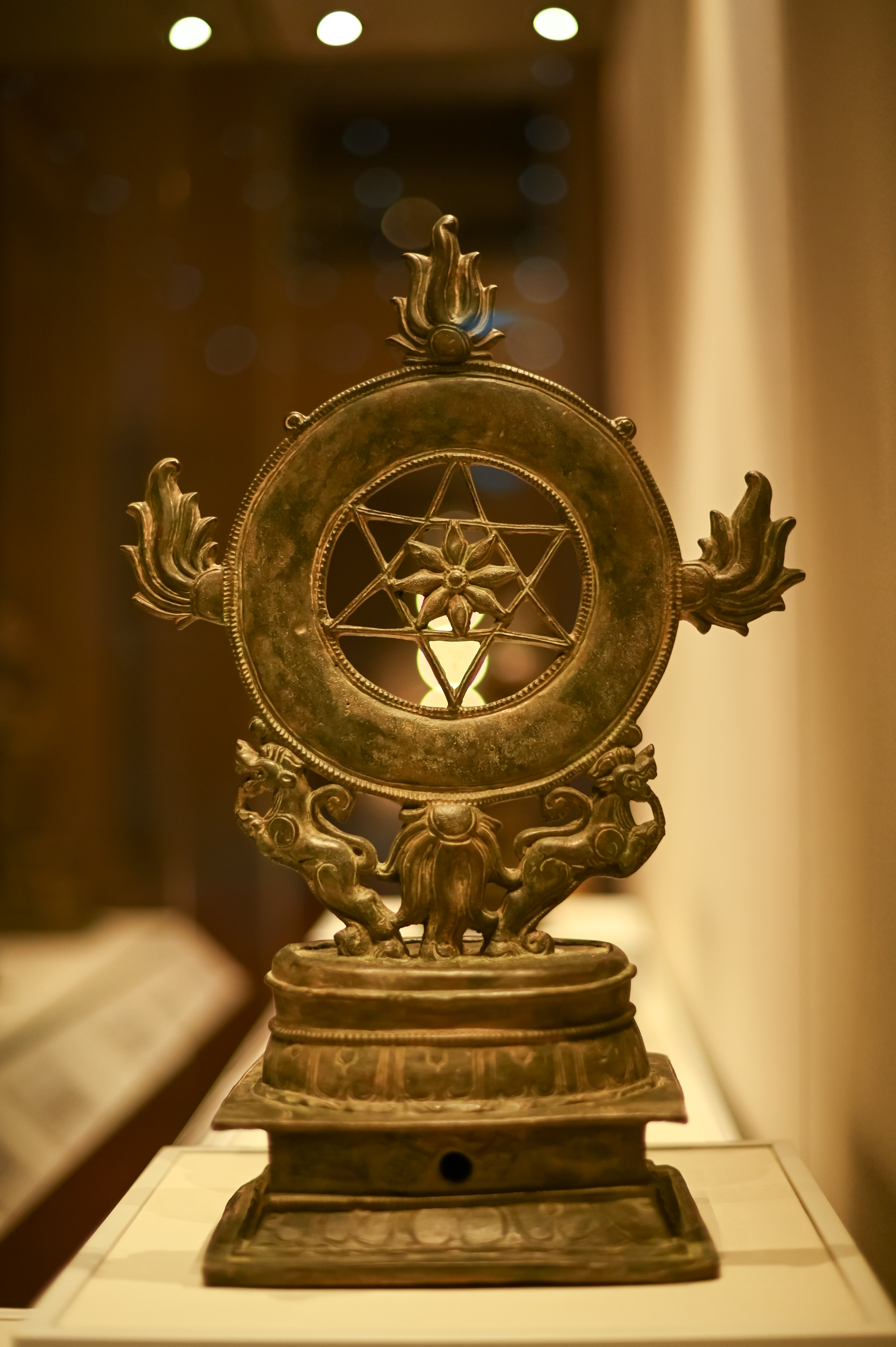
An 18th-century bronze representation of the Sudarshana Chakra at Asian Civilisations Museum, Singapore.

=== Philosophy ===
Various Pancharatra texts describe the Sudarshan chakra as prana, Maya, kriya, shakti, bhava, unmera, udyama and saṃkalpa. In the Ahirbudhanya Samhita of the Pancharatra, on bondage and liberation, the soul is represented as belonging to bhuti-shakti (made of 2 parts, viz., time (bhuti) and shakti (maya) which passes through rebirths until it is reborn in its own natural form which is liberated; with the reason and object of samsara remaining a mystery. Samsara is represented as the 'play' of God even though God in the Samhita's representation is the perfect one with no desire to play. The beginning and the end of the play is effected through Sudarshana, who in the Ahirbudhanya Samhita is the will of the omnipotent, omniscient, omnipresent God. The Sudarshana manifests in 5 main ways to wit the 5 Shaktis, which are creation, preservation, destruction, obstruction, and obscuration; to free the soul from taints and fetters which produce vasanas causing new births; so as to make the soul return to her natural form and condition which she shares with the supreme lord, namely, omnipotence, omniscience, omnipresence.

=== Weapon ===
According to the Ahirbudhanya Samhita, "Vishnu, in the form of Chakra, was held as the ideal of worship for kings desirous of obtaining universal sovereignty", a concept associated with the Bhagavata tradition in the Puranas, a religious condition traceable to the Gupta period, which also led to the chakravartin concept. The concept of universal sovereignty possibly facilitated the syncretism of Krishna and Vishnu and reciprocally reinforced their military power and heroic exploits; with the kshatriya hero, Krishna preserving order in the phenomenal world while the composite Vishnu is the creator and upholder of the universe supporting all existence. Begley notes the evolution of the anthropomorphic iconography of Sudarshana, beginning from early expansion of the Bhagavata sect thus:

"In contrast to the relatively simple religious function of the Cakra-Purusa, the iconographic role of the medieval Sudarsana-Purusa of South India was exceedingly complex. The medieval Sudarsana was conceived as a terrifying deity of destruction, for whose worship special tantric rituals were devised. The iconographic conception of Sudarsana as an esoteric agent of destruction constitutes a reassertion of the original militaristic connotation of the cakra".

An early scriptural reference in obtaining the 'grace of Sudarshana' through building a temple for him can be found in the Ahirbudhanya Samhita, in the story of Kushadhvaja, a king of the Janakas, who felt possessed by the devil causing him various ills, due to a sin from his past life in killing a righteous king. His guru advises him to build the temple, following which he performs propitiatory rites for 10 days upon which he is cured. However, the multi-armed Sudarsana as a horrific figure with numerous weapons standing on a flaming wheel comes from southern Indian iconography with the earliest example of the South Indian Sudarsana image being a small eight-armed bronze image from the 13th century.

== Worship ==
Though Chakraperumal or Chakratalvar shrines (sannidhis) are found inside Vishnu's temples, there are very few temples dedicated to Chakraperumal alone as the main deity (moolavar):

- Sri Sudarshana Bhagavan Temple, Nagamangala
- Chakrapani Temple, Kumbakonam – located on the banks of the Chakra Bathing Ghat of the Kaveri river. Here, the god is Chakra Rājan and his consort is Vijayavalli.
- Jagannath Temple, Puri, where Jagannath (a form of Vishnu-Krishna), Subhadra, Balabhadra and Sudarshana are the main deities.
- The temple of Chakraperumal in Gingee on the banks of Varahanadi is now defunct

In Kerala, Sudharsana Chakra is worshiped both directly and in the form of Shatrughna, one of four sons of King Dasharatha, and brother to Lord Rama, considered an avatar of Sudharsana Moorthy.

As Sudharsana Moorthy

- Alathiyur Pavelikkara Narayanathu Kavu Sudarshana Temple, Triprangode, Malappuram. A rare sudarshana temple complex in Kerala dedicated to Lord Sudarshana. Along with the main deity, Badrakali, Shastha and naga are worshipped here. The temple is also the paradevatha of mangalassery.
- Thuravoor Sree Narasimha Moorthy Temple, Alappuzha- One of the rare temple complexes in Kerala, where two sanctum sanctorums are situated within a single Nalambalam (temple structure), one of the sanctums in dedicated to Lord Narasimha and the other to Maha Sudarsana Moorthy. The Sudarsana Moorthy Temple is believed to be 1300 years old.
- Sreevallabha Temple, Thiruvalla, Pathanamthitta - One of the oldest and largest temples in Kerala and one of the 108 Divya Desams, Sudharsana Moorthy is worshipped along with Sreevallabha in this temple. The temple for Sudarshana Chakra was built by Sreedevi Antherjanam of Sankramangalathu Illam, and was rebuilt by Queen Cherumthevi in 59 BC.
- Thrichakrapuram Temple, Puthanchira- The main deity is Sudharsana Moorthy. In the morning, the deity is worshiped as the fierce Maha Sudharsana Moorthy, and in the evening as the calmer Sudharsana Moorthy. The evening pujas are conducted without incense lamps and bells, in the form of hand gestures. Although worship is for Lord Vishnu as Sudarshana Moorthy, as the temple's legend is connected to Lord Shiva, the crescent moon is the main ornament attached to the idol.
- Ayyarvattom Sree Maha Sudharshana Temple, Eravannur, Kozhikode
- Pallikkara Sri Mahavishnu Sudharsana Temple, Kozhikode

As Shatrughna avatar

- Payammal Sree Shatrughna Swami Temple, Thrissur
- Methiri Sree Sathrughnaswamy Temple, Kottayam
- Nedungaattu Sree Shatrugna Swami Temple(Mammalassery), Ernakulam
- Naranathu Shatrughna Swami Temple, Malappuram
- Payam Sri Mahavishu (Shatrughna) Temple, Kannur
- Sree Shatrughna Swami Temple, Kalkulam, Kuthannur, Palakkad

The icons of Chakra Perumal are generally built in the Vijayanagar style. There are two forms of Chakraperumal, one with 16 arms and another with 8 arms. The one with 16 arms is considered the god of destruction and is rarely found. The Chakraperumal shrine inside the Simhachalam Temple is home to the rare 16-armed form. The one with 8 arms is benevolent and is the form generally found in Vishnu's temples. Chakraperumal was deified an avatar of Vishnu himself, with the Ahirbudhnya Samhita identifying the Chakra-Purusha with Vishnu himself, stating Chakrarupi svayam Harih.

The Simhachalam Temple follows the ritual of Baliharana or purification ceremony. Sudarshana or Chakraperumal is the bali bera (icon that accepts sacrifices, as a representative of the chief deity) of Narasimha, where he stands with 16 arms holding emblems of Vishnu with a circular background halo. In Baliharana, Chakraperumal is taken to a yajnasala where a yajna (sacrifice) is performed, wherein cooked rice with ghee is offered while due murti mantras are chanted, along with the Vishnu Sukta and Purusha Sukta. Then he is taken on a palanquin around the temple with the remaining food offered to the guardian spirits of the temple.

Other temples with shrines to Sudarshana Chakra are Veeraraghava Swamy Temple, Thiruevvul; Ranganathaswamy Temple, Srirangapatna; Thirumohoor Kalamegaperumal temple, Madurai; and Varadharaja Perumal Temple, Kanchipuram.

The Sudarshana homam is performed by invoking Sudarshana along with his consort Vijayavalli into the sacrificial fire. This homam is very popular in South India.

== See also ==
- Aion (deity)
- Narayanastra
- Ayudhapurusha
- Ahirbudhnya Samhita
- Panchajanya
- Chakram
- Chakri dynasty of Thailand, named after this weapon.
- Sampo
- Zodiac wheel
