= Sattvata Samhita =

The Sattvata Samhita or Satvata Samhita is a Pancaratra text dealing with the Vyuha Manifestation. Together with the Pauskara-Samhita and the Jayakhya-Samhita, it is considered one of the "Three Gems", the most important samhitas. It was supposedly written around 500 CE, making it one of the oldest Pancaratras.
