= Parashiva =

Hindu deity

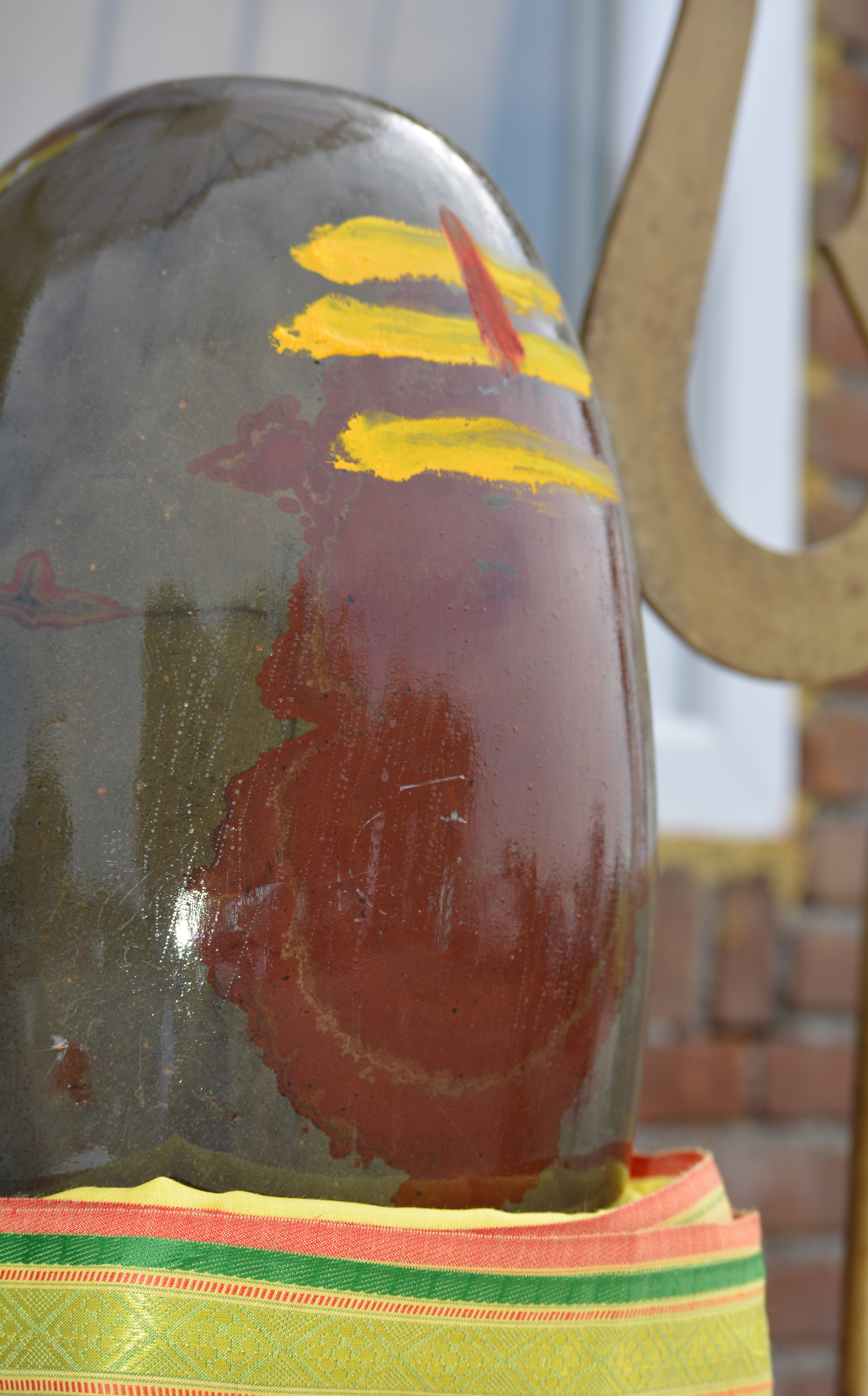
Upper part (oval stone) of Shiva lingam represents Parashiva

Parashiva (or Paramashiva, Paramshiva, or Parmshiva, among other spellings; Sanskrit: परशिव, IAST: Paraśiva) is the highest aspect of Shiva in Shaiva Siddhanta and in Kashmir Shaivism. Below him are the primordial Shiva with the Parashakti and Sadashiva with seven Shaktis.

== Shaiva Siddhanta ==
According to the Shaiva Siddhanta tradition, which is a major school of Shaivism, Parashiva is absolute reality which is beyond human comprehension and is beyond all attributes. According to Mahamahopadhaya Gopinath Kaviraj, in this aspect Shiva is both formless and with forms. He is beyond both dvaita and advaita. In Shaivite theology, Parashiva is both the source and the destination of everything in the existence.

According to the Shaiva Siddhanta tradition, the other two aspects of Shiva are Parashakti and Parameshwara.

The upper part (oval stone) of Shiva Lingam represents Parashiva while lower part (pedestal) represents Parashakti. Parashiva is beyond all of the 36 tattvas mentioned in Shaivism philosophy.

== Kashmir Shaivism ==
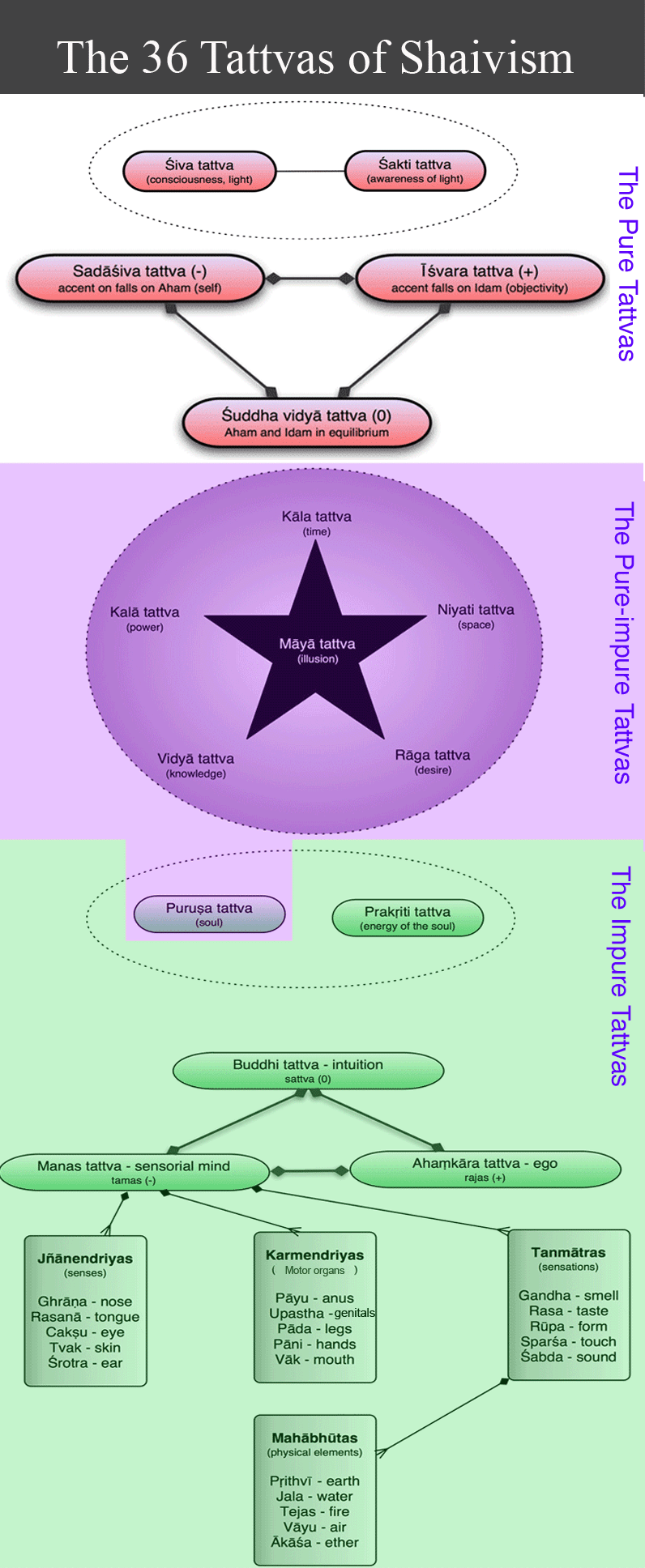
Paramashiva is the ultimate reality who either (according to Kashmir Shaivism) construct himself or (according to Shaiva siddhanta) beyond 36 tattvas, the whole elements of reality.

Kashmiri Shaivism describes how all of reality, with all of its diversity and fluctuation, is the play of the single principle, Paramashiva. The two aspects of this single reality are inseparably united: Shiva and Shakti. Paramashiva appears as the world through his creative power, Shakti. The ontological nature of Paramashiva is beyond human knowledge and articulation, yet it can be experienced directly through mystical intuition.

The Kashmir Shaivism tradition, also called Trika Shaivism, is a non-dualist branch of Shaiva-Shakta Tantra Hinduism that originated in Kashmir after 850 CE. In its place of origin in Kashmir, this tradition is commonly referred to as "Kashmiri Shaivism." It later spread beyond Kashmir, with its great scholar Abhinavagupta calling it "Trika" (meaning "the Trinity"). It particularly flourished in the states of Odisha and Maharashtra. Defining features of the Trika tradition are its idealistic and monistic Pratyabhijna ("Recognition") philosophical system, propounded by Utpaladeva (c. 925–975 CE) and Abhinavagupta (c. 975–1025 CE), and the centrality of the three goddesses Parā, Parāparā, and Aparā.

== See also ==
- Brahman
- Krishna
- Mahaganapati
- Mahavishnu
- Nirguna Brahman
