= Pāśa =

Pāśa (Sanskrit: पाश, romanized: pāśa, lit. "bondage", "fetter") is one of the three main components considered in Shaivism. It is defined as whole of the existence, manifest and unmanifest. According to Shaiva Siddhanta, Pati (the supreme being), Pashu (atmans) and Pasha are eternal, self-consistent, neither distinguishable nor indivisible triad in the nature.

== Tether ==
The Shaivite three components are easily understandable as pashu (litt. cow), pasha (litt. rope) and pati (litt. cow-herd). All atmans or pashus are eternally tethered by pasha and they don't know their destination. There comes pati to rear them towards the Moksha. This pati differ from ordinary cowherd as he doesn't obtain any advantages either by growing or shepherding cattle, and pashus cannot realize anything with their limited movement caused by pasha.
