= Vaikuntha Chaturdashi =

Hindu holy day

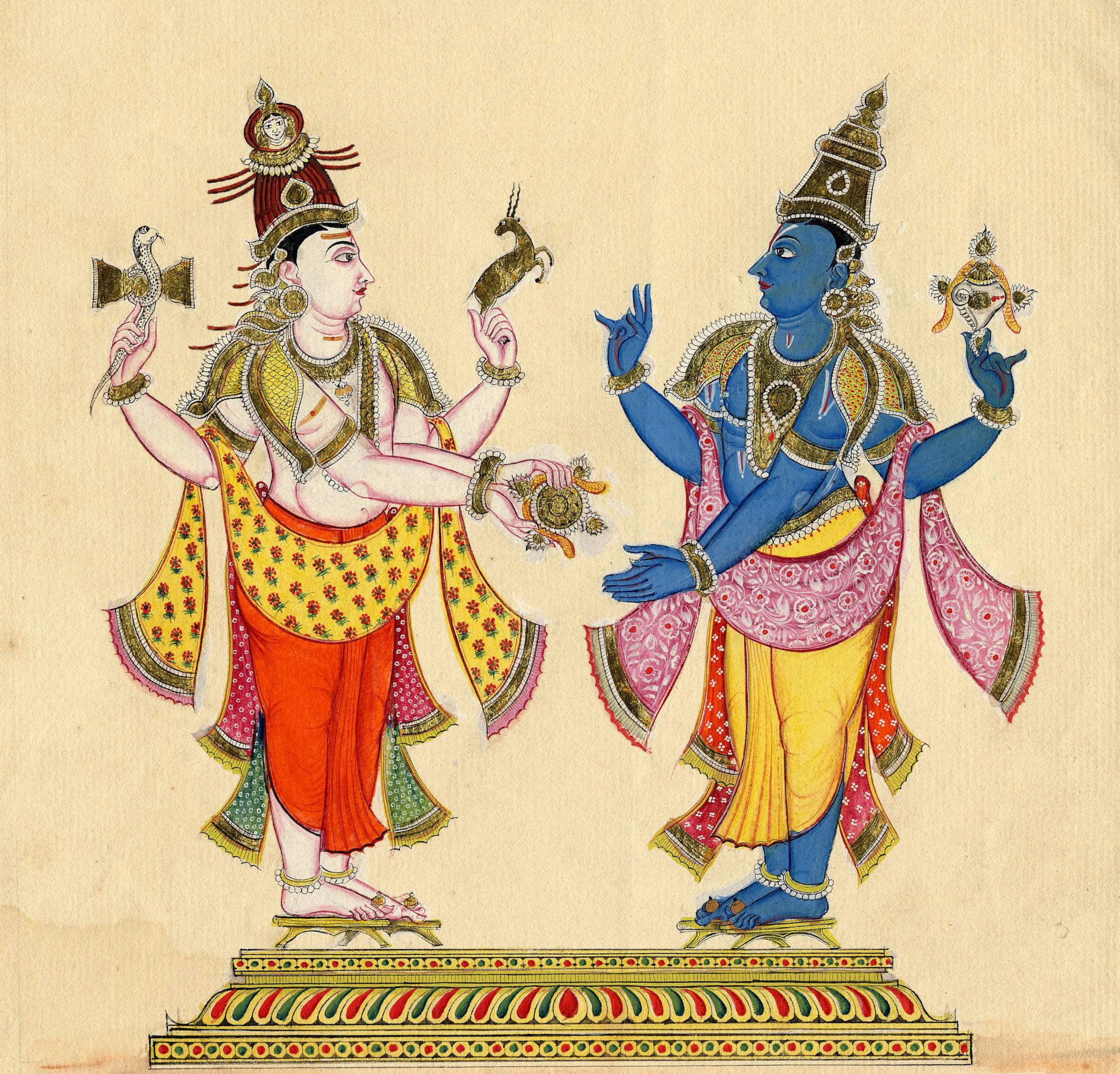
- Painting of Shiva presenting the Sudarshana Chakra to Vishnu
- Observed by: Hindus
- Type: Hindu
- Observances: Prayers and religious rituals, including puja with lotus flowers, lighting dipas and battis (cotton wick) for Vishnu and Shiva
- Date: Decided by the lunar calendar
- Related to: Kartika Purnima

Vaikuntha Chaturdashi (Sanskrit: वैकुंठचतुर्दशी, romanized: Vaikuṇṭhachaturdaśī, lit. 'The fourteenth day of Vaikuntha') is a Hindu holy day, which is observed on chaturdashi, the 14th lunar day of the waxing moon fortnight (shukla paksha) of the Hindu month of Kartika (November–December). The day is sacred to the deities Vishnu and Shiva. They are worshipped individually or together in different temples in Varanasi, Rishikesh, Gaya, and Maharashtra.

The holy day of Vaikuntha Chaturdashi is also observed in Maharashtra by the Marathas as per the custom set by Shivaji and his mother Jijabai for this occasion and by the Gaud Saraswat Brahmins, though in a slightly different format.

== Legend ==
According to Shiva Purana, once, the preserver deity, Vishnu left his abode Vaikuntha and went to Varanasi to worship Shiva on this day. He pledged to worship Shiva with a thousand lotuses. While singing hymns in glorification of Shiva, Vishnu found thousandth lotus missing. Vishnu, whose eyes are often compared to lotuses, plucked one of them and offered it to Shiva. A pleased Shiva, restored Vishnu's eye and rewarded him the Sudarshana Chakra, Vishnu's discus and sacred weapon.

According to regional folklore related to the Varanasi festivities, a Brahmin named Dhaneshwar who had spent his lifetime committing several sins, visited the bank of the Godavari River to take a bath and wash off his sins, when Vaikuntha Chaturdashi was being observed by a large number of devotees by offering earthen lighted lamps and batti (wick) to the sacred river. Dhaneshwar mingled with the crowd. When he died, his soul was taken by Yama, the god of death, to hell for punishment. However, Shiva intervened and told Yama that Dhaneshwar's sins were cleansed due to the touch of the devotees on Vaikuntha Chaturdashi. Then Dhaneshwar was released from hell and got a place in the Vaikuntha.

== Folklore in Maharashtra ==
This folklore in Maharashtra state in India is a practice that was set by King Shivaji, the founder of the Maratha Empire and his mother Jijabai. After King Shivaji was crowned, the capital was built at Raigarh, which also had a large lotus tank called Kushavarta. The lotus flowers in the tank bloomed during the month of Kartika in a splendour of white, blue and red colours. When Jijabai and Shivaji saw the blooms, and Jijabai commented to Shivaji that Vaikuntha Chaturdashi was in the offing. Shivaji recalled the Vishnu and Shiva legend. Like Vishnu, Jijabai also wished to offer a thousand white lotus flowers to Shiva at his Jagadeeshwara temple. She was very particular that the flowers should be unblemished white lotus flowers, fresh and unplucked by any other person (as by such an act its divine quality would be lost). As the aged Jijabai would be able to pick the flowers by herself, Shivaji was unable to find a way to fulfil her wish and convened his court to discuss the problem. In the court, Vikram Dalvi - the young a personal body guard of Shivaji had a solution. Then Dalvi offered to undertake this task and assured Jijabhai and Shivaji that he would pick the lotuses without touching them. Shivaji told him that if he failed he would be subject to severe punishment. On Vaikuntha Chaturdashi, Dalvi went to the tank, early in the morning, offered his obeisance to Shivaji and Jijabai, when other courtiers and citizens had gathered to watch the event. Then he lay down flat on the ground in front of the tank and shot arrows one after the other in quick succession to cut the lotus stems. Then he got into the tank in a boat and used a pair of tongs to pick the flowers without touching them, as promised. Shivaji and Jijabai were pleased with the ingenious and incomparable performance of the archery skill of Dalvi, and as a gesture of appreciation presented him with a gold and emerald necklace, in the presence of the assembled crowd.

== Worship rituals ==
Devotees of Vishnu offer him a thousand lotuses while reciting the Vishnu Sahasranama, the thousand names of Vishnu. The Vishnupada Temple, which is believed to have footprints of Vishnu, celebrates its main temple festival in this period. The festival is also celebrated as kartika snanam (bathing in a river or stream during the Kartika month) by Vaishnavas. In Rishikesh, this day is observed as Deep Daan Mahotsav to mark the occasion of Vishnu waking up, out of his deep sleep. As a mark of environmental awareness, the deeps or lamps are made of flour (which would disintegrate in water) instead of burnt earthen lamps. The lighted lamps are floated in the holy Ganges River in the evening. This is accompanied by several cultural festivities.

On this occasion, Vishnu is given a special place of honour in the sanctum of Kashi Vishwanath temple, a prominent Shiva temple in Varanasi. The temple is described as Vaikuntha on this day. Both the deities are duly worshipped as though they are worshipping each other. Vishnu offers tulsi (holy basil) leaves (traditionally used in Vishnu worship) to Shiva, and Shiva in turn offers Bael leaves (traditionally offered to Shiva) to Vishnu, which is taboo otherwise, to each other. Devotees start the pujas after taking baths, fasting for the whole day, and offering akshat ( turmeric mixed rice), sandalwood (Chandan) paste, sacred waters of the Ganges, flowers, incense and camphor to both the deities. Then they offer lighted deeps (earthen lamps) and batti (cotton wick) as a special offering for the day. In Varanasi, women, particularly old women, outnumber others in offering prayers on this occasion. Over the years, the number of devotees participating in this festival has increased.

At the Grishneshwar temple of Shiva, Vishnu is offered Bael leaves and Shiva is offered Tulsi leaves. It is considered to portray the union of Vishnu and Shiva. In the Tilbhandeshvar temple in Nashik, the 2 feet (0.61 m) linga - aniconic form of Shiva - is dressed up in finery and a silver mask, as Ardhanarinateshvara, the half-male, half-female form of Shiva. Thousands of people worship the Tilbhandeshvar and Shiva Kampaleshvar temples in Nashik. The festival is one of the three important festivals of these temples.

Another observance is by celebrating avail bhojan (means a dinner) taken under the Phyllanthus emblica tree (Indian gooseberry).

It is also prominently celebrated in Vishnu temples like Srirangam (Tamil Nadu), Tirupati Srinivasa temple (Andhra Pradesh), Udupi Sri Krishna Mutt (Karnataka) and many more. It is a custom to light lamps in a cut summer squash, after removing its core, thus fashioning a lamp (others use earthen lamps) and using 360 wicks, that some make by themselves specially for this occasion. These wicks are customarily as long as the pod of a cereal (moong dal)
