= Vaijayanti =

Garland in Hindu mythology

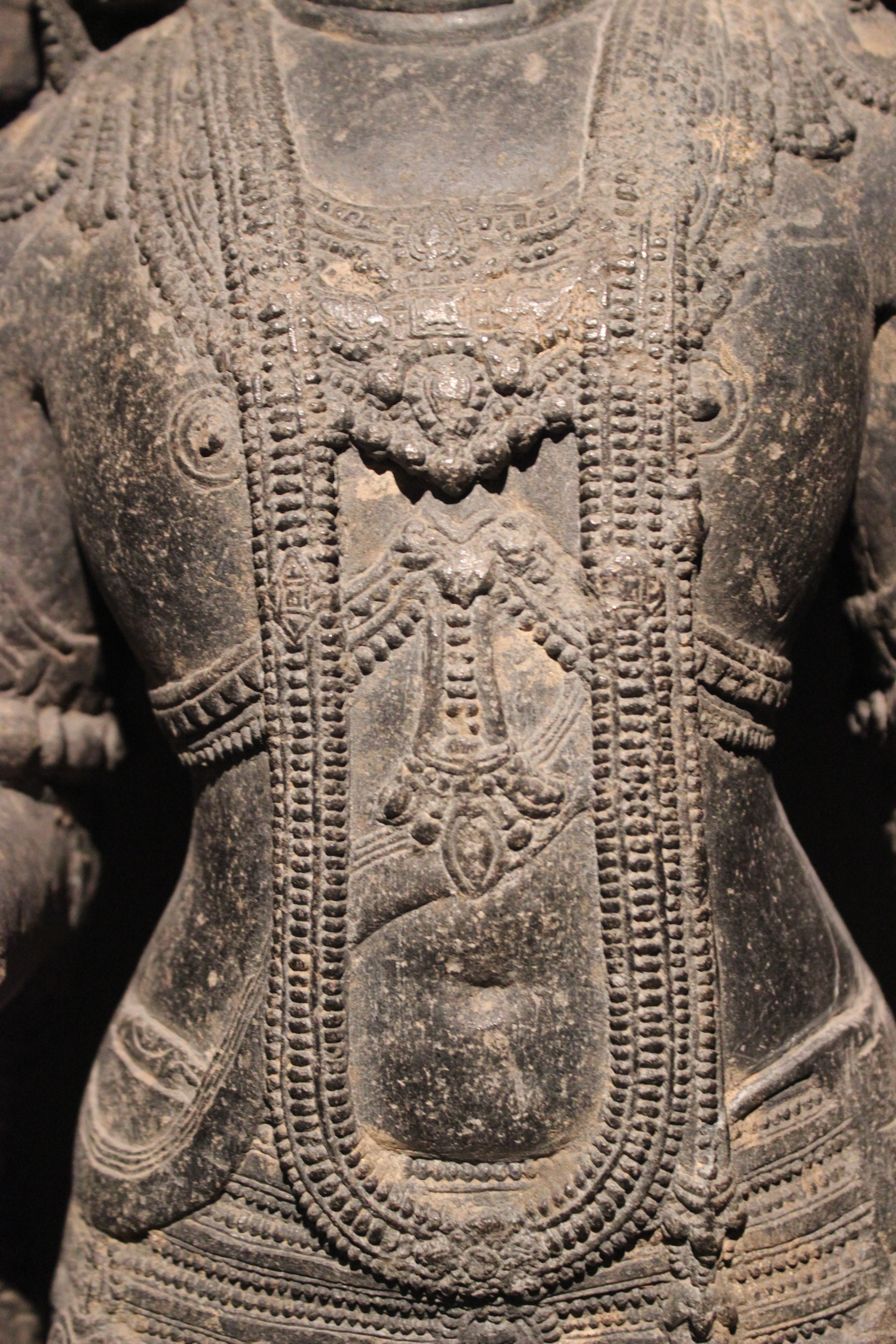
The Vaijayanti, Karnataka

The Vaijayanti (Sanskrit: वैजयन्ति, romanized: Vaijayantī, lit. 'garland of victory') is a transcendental garland or elemental necklace, primarily associated with Vishnu and his avatar Krishna. It is a significant symbol in the Bhagavata tradition of Vaishnavism, representing divine authority and mastery over the material world. Employed in its worship as a garland, this object is also called the vaijayantimala, vyajayanti, or the vanamala.

== Description ==
The garland is traditionally described as being made from five jewels: emerald, pearl, ruby, sapphire and diamond. In some descriptions, it is characterized as a vanamala (i.e., a long garland of flowers) that is specifically referred to as a vaijayantimala when it is studded with these five jewels.

== Literature ==
Vaijayanti finds a mention in the Vishnu Sahasranama, a stotra dedicated to Vishnu in the Mahabharata, as vanamali (forest flowers):

vanamalī gadī śarṅgī śaṅkhī cakrī ca nandakī
śrīman narayano visnurvasudevo’bhiraksatu

The garland of victory is mentioned in the Mahabharata, as made of never-wilting lotuses. In the Skanda Purana, Varuna presents Lakshmi with the garland as a wedding gift. According to the Vishnu Purana, the garland prominently displays five precious gemstones: emerald, sapphire, ruby, pearl, and diamond. These correspond with the five classic elements commonly named earth, water, fire, air, and ether respectively. In the Shiva Purana, Vishnu offers his garland to Kartikeya, before his battle with the asura Taraka. The Garuda Purana includes a prayer known as the Vishnu Panjaram, which includes the following verse: "Taking up Vaijayanti and Shrivatsa, the ornament of thy throat do thou protect me in the north-west, O god, O Hayagriva. I bow unto thee".

== Significance ==
In religious and philosophical contexts, the five jewels of the Vaijayanti represent the sphere of the five senses. Its name, which translates to the "Garland of Victory," signifies its status as a luminous collar worn by the divine.

The Vaijayanti is listed among the traditional signs and symbols of Vishnu - alongside the Shrivatsa (a mark on the chest), the Kaustubha jewel, and the pitambara (yellow garmets) - all of which were eventually associated with Krishna, a manifestation of Vishnu.

According to Puranic accounts, such as those found in the Bhagavata Puana, when Krishna was born to Devaki, he manifested in his four-armed form already adorned with the Vaijayantimala. In the Gopalavimshati, a 13th-century hymn by the philosopher-poet Vedantadesika, the infant Krishna is venerated specifically for wearing this "luminous collar" while residing in Vrindavan. the transition of this symbol from Vishnu to Krishna is seen by scholars as part of a transition where the epithets and ornaments of the supreme deity were shifted toward his manifestation as well.

== Contemporary References ==
In the Sri Vaishnava tradition, the poet-saint Thondaradippodi Alvar is regarded to be a manifestation of the Vanamala.

== See also ==
- Padma
- Kaustubha
- Shaligrama
