= Brihad Bhagavatamrita =

Hindu text

Brihad-bhagavatamrita is a sacred text for followers of the Hindu tradition of Gaudiya Vaishnavism. Along with Hari-bhakti-vilasa, it is one of the most important works of Vaishnava theologian Sanatana Goswami. While Hari-bhakti-vilasa sets out guidance for Vaishnava behavior and ritual, Brihad-bhagavatamrita contains an analysis of the teachings of Chaitanya from an ontological and metaphysical perspective.

== Contents ==
Sri Brhad-bhagavatāmṛta is divided in two cantos: Pūrva-khaṇḍa, or first, and Uttar-khaṇḍa, or last. The name of the First Canto is Śrī Bhagavat-kṛpā-sāra-nirdhāraṇa khaṇḍa – Ascertaining the Essence of the Mercy of the Supreme Lord. The Second Canto is known as Śrī Golokamāhātmya- nirūpaṇa khaṇḍa – Ascertaining the Glories of Śrī Goloka.

In the first part of Brihad-bhagavatamrita Sanatana Goswami has described a conversation between Parikshit and his mother, Uttara. It took place after Parikshit heard the Bhagavata Purana from Śuka. Uttara asked her son to explain the essence of Bhagavata Purana, and Parikshit revealed to her the stages of confidential Bhakti. He told her a story about how Narada was looking for greatest devotee of Krishna. The Great Rishi began his search with devotees of Krishna whose Bhakti was mixed with karma and jnana (Brahma and Shiva), then went up to Shanta-rasa (Prahlada), Dasya-rasa (Hanuman), Sakhya-rasa (Arjuna), and finally came to the greatest devotee of Krishna - Uddhava, who always longed to be in Vrindavan, and showed that the highest level of Bhakti is the love of the gopis for Krishna.

The second part of Brihad-bhagavatamrita tells us about the glory and bliss of the spiritual abode Goloka, as well as of the process of renunciation of the material world, true knowledge, Bhakti Yoga, love for Krishna and implementation of the higher purpose of life. The second part contains the narrative of a wandering shepherd boy, who received a mantra from a resident of Vrindavan, travelling from one planetary system to another, exploring the different levels of consciousness of living beings. His spiritual odyssey covers Vaikuntha, Brahmaloka, Shivaloka and the heavenly planets.

Second Canto contains four chapters:

(1) Vairāgya – Renunciation (2) Jñāna – Knowledge (3) Bhajana – Devotional Service (4) Vaikuṇṭha – The Spiritual World Each of the two cantos of this scripture is a separate history. Our worshipful author has not merely written two histories. Rather, for facilitating the worship of the divine couple, Śrī Śrī Rādhā-Kṛṣṇa, he has thoroughly analyzed Their Lordships’ fundamental reality and nature.

Śrīmad-Bhāgavatam is the essence of all scriptures, such as the Vedas, Vedānta, Purāṇas, Itihāsas, and so on. By churning that essence, this book, aptly named Śrī Bṛhad-bhāgavatāmṛta – the Essential Nectar of the Bhāgavatam – has become manifest. Throughout this book, all topics regarding devotional service to Bhagavān have been presented. The original discourse of the book between Śrī Jaimini and Janamejaya is based on a conversation between Śrī Parīkṣit and Uttarā. After Śrī Parīkṣit had heard Śrīmad-Bhāgavatam from the lips of Śrī Śukadeva Gosvāmī, and before the snake-bird Takṣaka arrived, Parīkṣit's mother, Śrī Uttarā-devī, said to him, “O my dear son, please narrate to me, in simple, easy-to-understand language, the essence of what you have heard from Śrī Śukadeva Gosvāmī.” Śrī Bṛhadbhāgavatāmṛta begins with this inquiry.

In the Second Canto, the author examines all the manifestations and incarnations of the Supreme Personality of Godhead, beginning with Śrī Śālagrāma Bhagavān and ending with Śrī Nandanandana, the beloved son of Śrī Nanda Mahārāja. This volume begins with the history of Gopa-kumāra. Gopa-kumāra receives the gopāla-mantra from his gurudeva. Due to the influence of this gopāla-mantra, it becomes possible for him to travel to all abodes without restriction. First, he takes darśana of the manifestations of Bhagavān that appear in this earthly realm, or Bhū-maṇḍala, such as Śrī Śālagrāma Bhagavān; the Deity manifestation of the Lord who is ensconced in the palace of the king; and the ancient Deity of Śrī Jagannāthadeva. He sequentially describes their progressively greater glories. Then, by the influence of the chanting of his mantra, he reaches the planets of Svarga, Mahar, Janas, Tapas, and Satya, where one by one he has divine vision of the worshipable manifestations of the Lord who manifest in those abodes. Thus he also experiences Their transcendental excellences in succession. Yet Gopa-kumāra does not experience complete happiness in those places.

Thereafter, he takes darśana of the manifestations of Bhagavān that are present in the eight coverings of the universe and arrives in the abode of liberation. In mukti-loka, the realm of liberation, Gopakumāra sees the manifestation of the brilliance of the Supreme Person, but still, complete satisfaction eludes him. After this, in accordance with regulative principles, he performs saṅkīrtana of the holy name, the most prominent of the nine processes of bhakti. By the potency of nāma-saṅkīrtana, he travels first to Vaikuṇṭha, then to Ayodhyā, and then to Dvārakā-purī. However, because in those realms the mood of aiśvarya, or awe and reverence for the Lord, is prominent, he cannot freely associate with the worshipful manifestations of the Supreme Person there.

Finally, Gopa-kumāra returns to Vṛndāvana manifest on earth, where he executes rāgānugā bhakti, spontaneous devotional service that follows the moods of the eternal associates of Vraja. By the potency of his practice of rāgānugā bhakti, he attains Goloka-Vṛndāvana. There, he obtains his cherished goal – service to Śrī Kṛṣṇa, the son of the king of Vraja.

One should not conclude from this history that there is any difference in the tattva, or fundamental truth, of the various manifestations of Bhagavān. All manifestations of the Lord are complete, from Śrī Śālagrāma Bhagavān to Śrī Nandanandana (Kṛṣṇa, the darling son of Nanda Mahārāja). From the perspective of tattva, They are one, yet from the perspective of rasa, or the sweetness of transcendental relationships, Śrī Nandanandana is the most excellent.

Brihad-bhagavatamrita contains descriptions of the various categories of devotees of Krishna: close devotees, and devotees of the closest devotees. Bhaktivedanta Swami Prabhupada in his comments to the Chaitanya-charitamrita (Adi Lila, 5.203) writes that anyone who wants to learn about the devotees and about devotional service to Krishna should read Brihad-bhagavatamrita.

== Notes ==
- Sanātana Gosvāmī; Bhānu Swami (2018), Śrī Bṛhad-bhāgavatāmṛta. Includes English translation of the original text, and a full-translation of the Dig-darśinī commentary. (3 volumes)
- Garg, Gaṅgā Rām (1982), An Encyclopedia of Indian Literature, Mittal Publishers, ISBN 9780391027794
- Sanatana Goswami; Gopiparanadhana Dasa (2002), Śrī Bṛhad-bhagavatāmrta. Includes the Devanagari text, a roman transliteration, word-for-word meanings, English translation, and a summary of the Dig-darśinī commentary. (3 volumes), Bhaktivedanta Book Trust, ISBN 0-89213-348-1
