= Nanjiyar =

Hindu theologian

- Born: Madhava; 1182; Tirunarayanapuram
- Died: 1287 (aged 104–105); Srirangam
- Other names: Nañcīyar, Nañjīyar, Nanjiar, Nanjeeyar
- Occupation: Philosopher
- Known for: Leader of the Sri Vaishnava sect
- Notable work: Commentary on Tiruvaymoli

Nanjiyar (c. 1182-1287) was a Sri Vaishnava philosopher from present-day Tamil Nadu, India. He wrote a commentary on the Tamil-language text Tiruvaymoli.

== Legendary biography ==
The Tenkalai tradition (Guru-parampara) of the Sri Vaishnava tradition narrates the biography of Nanjiyar as follows:

Nanjiyar, originally known as Madhava, was born at Tirunarayanapuram in the Kaliyuga year 4214. (This corresponds to 1112 CE, and is chronologically absurd, as the legend describes him as a contemporary of Parashara Bhattarya, who had died 22 years earlier). Madhava was a prominent Advaita Vedanta scholar, and had two wives. A wealthy and charitable man, he was so proud that he sat on a throne.

Meanwhile, in Srirangam, Ramanuja's cousin Embar succeeded him as the leader of Sri Vaishnavas, followed by Parashara Bhattarya. One day, Parashara learned about Madhava and his extravagant claims through a Brahmin pilgrim, and resolved to convert him to Vaishnavism. Parashara went to Gangorai (near Shringeri), where Madhava lived. Parashara disguised himself as a Brahmin among a crowd whom Madhava fed everyday, and asked him for alms in form of a philosophical debate. The ensuing debate continued for ten days, and on the eleventh day, Parashara defeated Madhava with the help of Tirumangai Alvar's Tirunetuntantakam and Yamunacharya's Mayavadakhandanam. Madhava accepted his defeated, converted to Vaishnavism, and adopted Ramanuja's Vishishtadvaita philosophy.

Madhava accepted Parashara as his acharya (teacher), and expressed his desire to follow Parashara to Srirangam. However, Parashara told him to continue feeding Brahmins at his own place. Parashara obeyed him, and started providing hospitality to Sri Vaishnavas. One day, his wives treated two Sri Vaishnava travelers disrespectfully. When he learned about this incident, he was disappointed, and decided to renounce the world. He divided his wealth into three parts, one each for his wives, and the remaining for Parashara. He then became a sanyasin and went to Srirangam, the centre of Sri Vaishnava school. Parashara gave him the title Nanjiyar, that is "our saint"(nam-jiyar).

Nanjiyar wrote a commentary to the Tamil-language text Tiruvaymoli. According to a legend, he asked Nambur Varadaraja to make a copy of this text. On the way to his village, Varadaraja lost the original manuscript while crossing the Kaveri River. Varadaraja then wrote the entire commentary from his memory. Nanjiyar found that Varadaraja's copy contained additional interpretations and was much better than the original manuscript. Nanjiyar called Varadaraja his own son (nam pillai), and appointed him as his successor. Nampillai was also known as Nambilla, Namburi Varadarya, and Lokacharya.

Nanjiyar was also known as Periya-jiyar, Vedanti Mādhava-dāsa, Mādhva-sūri, Vedānti-muni, Ranganatha-muni, and Nārāyaṇa-muni.

== Works ==
Nanjiyar wrote a commentary on Tiruvaymoli, called Onpatinayirappadi ("9000 padis"), so-called after its 9000 padis or granthas (a unit comprising 32 letters).

In his commentary, Nanjiyar discusses objections to the sacred status of Tiruvaymoli, such as that it was composed by a low-caste man in a language not suitable for sacred purposes; its songs were recited by low-caste men and even women; these songs were not known outside the Tamil-speaking region where even those outside the Vedic faith honored them; the songs downgraded traditional ideals of Sanskrit-language tradition, such as kaivalya; and discussed topics such as sexual desire that were traditionally disapproved of.

Nanjiyar refuted these objections by stating that these alleged flaws were actually virtues: the Shudra author of Tiruvaymoli had accumulated so much merit in his past lives that Vishnu provided him divine inspiration and grace; the author's rendition of the meaning of the Vedas in Tamil allowed even those who were not entitled to read the Vedas (such as Shudras and women) to find salvation; the hymns are so excellent that even those following non-Vedic lifestyle accept them; even non-Tamils wished they knew Tamil just to be able to understand these songs; and the songs did not exclude traditional values but organized them in a proper hierarchy.

Nanjiyar and other Sri Vaishnava teachers promoted the view that revelation is fully expressed equally in Tamil and Sanskrit languages: the Sanskrit texts teach what the god has in mind, while the Tamil text Tiruvaymoli expresses the nature of god most clearly and perfectly to inspire and increase devotion.
