= Dāmodara Bhaṭṭa =

Indian Sanskrit scholar

Dāmodara Bhaṭṭa was a Sanskrit scholar and author of the Yantra-cintāmaṇi, also called the Kalpa-cintāmaṇi, a text that deals with the use of yantras in the performance of magical rites (abhicāra). He lived in north India during the second half of the sixteenth century.
