= Shrivatsa =

Auspicious symbol in Indian religious traditions

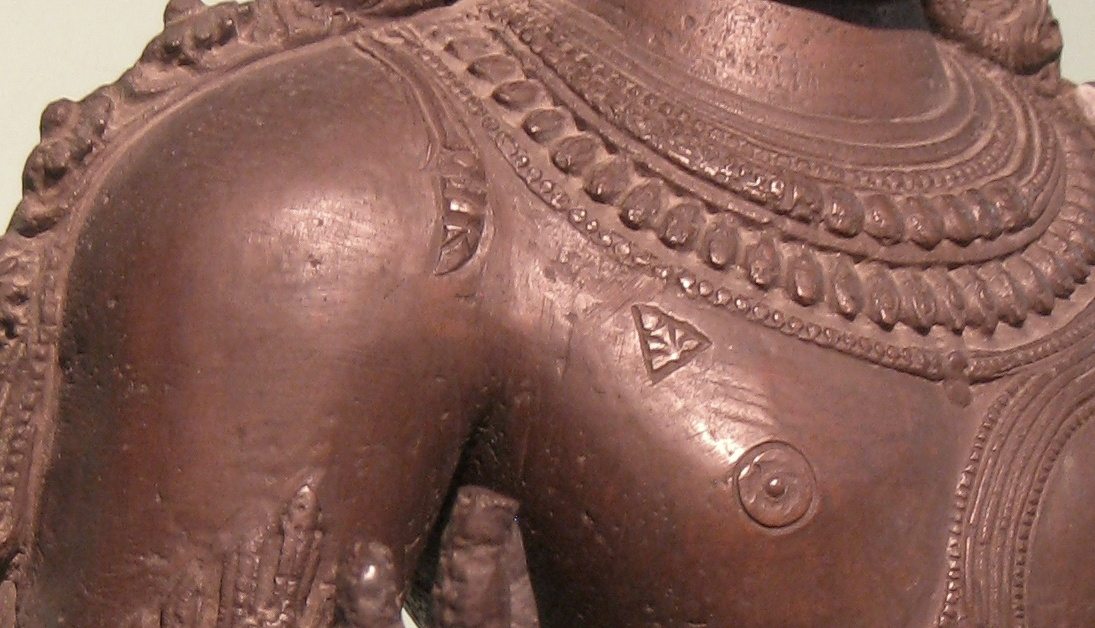
Shrivatsa as a triangular mark on right side of Vishnu's chest

The Shrivatsa (Sanskrit: श्रीवत्स; IAST: Śrīvatsa, lit. 'Beloved of Śrī') is an ancient symbol, considered auspicious in Hinduism and other Indian religious traditions.

== Hinduism ==
=== Origin ===
Shrivatsa means "Beloved of Shri", an epithet of Vishnu, and a reference to his consort, the goddess Lakshmi, also called Shri. It is a mark on the chest of Vishnu, where his consort is described to reside.

The Bhagavata Purana explains the origin of this mark. The story goes that a number of maharishis once gathered on the banks of the river Sarasvati to perform a yajna. A dispute arose among these sages regarding the superiority of the members of the Trimurti: Brahma, Vishnu, or Shiva. The sage Bhrigu was appointed to discover the truth of this matter, and undertook this task by travelling to the abodes of these deities. Brahma, who was busy discussing with the gods, ignored him. He grew anxious when Kailasanatha rose to embrace him, which offended the deity. Bhrigu then journeyed to the abode of Vishnu:

Bhṛgu then turned his steps to Vaikuṇṭha, the abode of Mahāviṣṇu. There he saw Mahāviṣṇu in a deep slumber. Seeing Mahāviṣṇu whose task is the preservation of the world, sleeping like an irresponsible person, Bhṛgu gave him a kick on his breast. Viṣṇu who sprang up suddenly, saw Bhṛgu standing before him. He begged pardon of the sage. He declared that he would carry Bhṛgu’s footprint permanently on his chest as a sign of his repentance for having shown disrespect to the Maharṣi. This foot-print still remains on Viṣṇu’s chest and is known by the name "Śrīvatsa". In this way, the Munis came to the conclusion that Mahāviṣṇu is the noblest of the Trimūrtis.

— Bhagavata Purana

In the legend of Tirumala, Vishnu's consort, Lakshmi, is offended by the fact that the sage had kicked the chest of her husband where she sit. She furiously descends upon the earth, where Vishnu finds her as Padmavati, and remarries her in his avatar of Srinivasa.

It is said that the tenth avatar of Vishnu, Kalki, will bear the Shrivatsa mark on his chest.

श्रीवत्सवक्षाः श्रीवासः श्रीपतिः श्रीमतांवरः

—Shrivatsa is one of the names of Vishnu in the Vishnu Sahasranamam.
Translation:

The symbol offers the deity another epithet, Śrīvatsalāñcchana, which translates to, "He who has the mark or scar of Śrīvatsa on his chest".

=== In popular culture ===
Shrivatsa is a popular name in Andhra Pradesh, Telangana, Tamil Nadu and Karnataka.

The srivatsa also appears in the video game Raji: An Ancient Epic, where it is depicted as a shield used by the titular Raji alongside the sword of Vishnu.

=== Historical symbolism ===
In South India, in the bronze sculptures made after circa 10th century, the Shrivatsa symbol is shown as an inverted triangle on the right chest of Vishnu, and his various incarnations.

== Buddhism ==
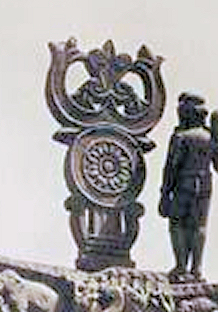
The compound Buddhist symbols: shrivatsa within the Three Jewels over a chakra on the Torana gate at Sanchi. 1st century BCE.

In Buddhism, the śrīvatsa is said to be a feature of the tutelary deity (Tibetan: yidam) Mañjuśrī the Youth (Skt: Mañjuśrīkumārabhūta).

In Tibetan Buddhism, the śrīvatsa (Tib: དཔལ་བེའུ་, Wyl: dpal be'u) is depicted as a triangular swirl or an endless knot. In the Chinese tradition, Buddhist prayer beads are often tied at the tassels in this shape.

In some lists of the 80 secondary characteristics, it is said that a Buddha's heart is adorned with the śrīvatsa.

== Jainism ==
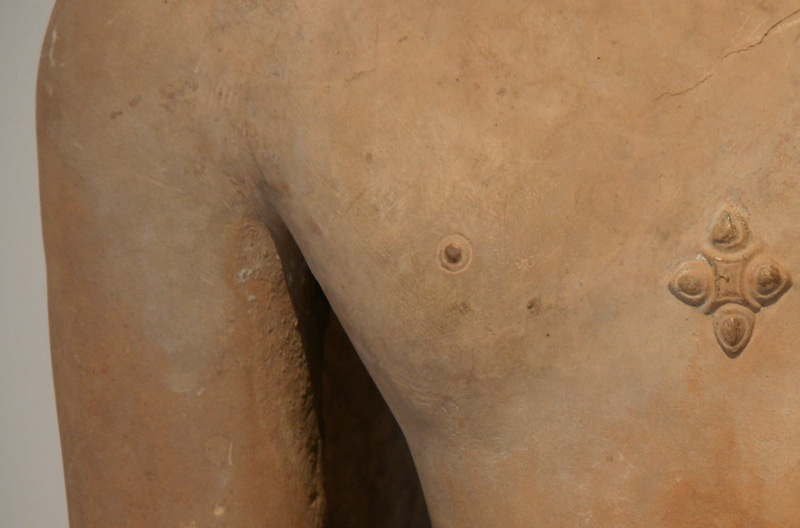
Shrivatsa as Flower-shaped symbol on Jain Tirthankar Rishabhanatha's chest

In Jain iconography, Shrivatsa often marks the chest of the Tirthankara image. It is one of the Ashtamangala (eight auspicious symbols) found in Jainism. The canonical texts such as Hemchandra's Trīṣaṣṭiśalākāpuruṣacaritra and Mahapurana mentions it as one of the Ashtamangalas. Acharya Dinakara explains in his medieval work that the highest knowledge emerged from the heart of Tirthankaras in the form of Shrivatsa so they are marked as such. In North Indian Jain sculptures of the early centuries, it is marked in the centre of the chest.

== Other uses ==
Flag of Rakhine State, showing the Shrivatsa

The Shrivatsa is the symbol of Rakhine State and the Rakhine people of Burma.

== See also ==
- Aurva
- Cintamani Gem
- Kaustubha Gem
- Syamantaka Gem
