= Sri Shiva Narada Muni Temple, Chigateri =

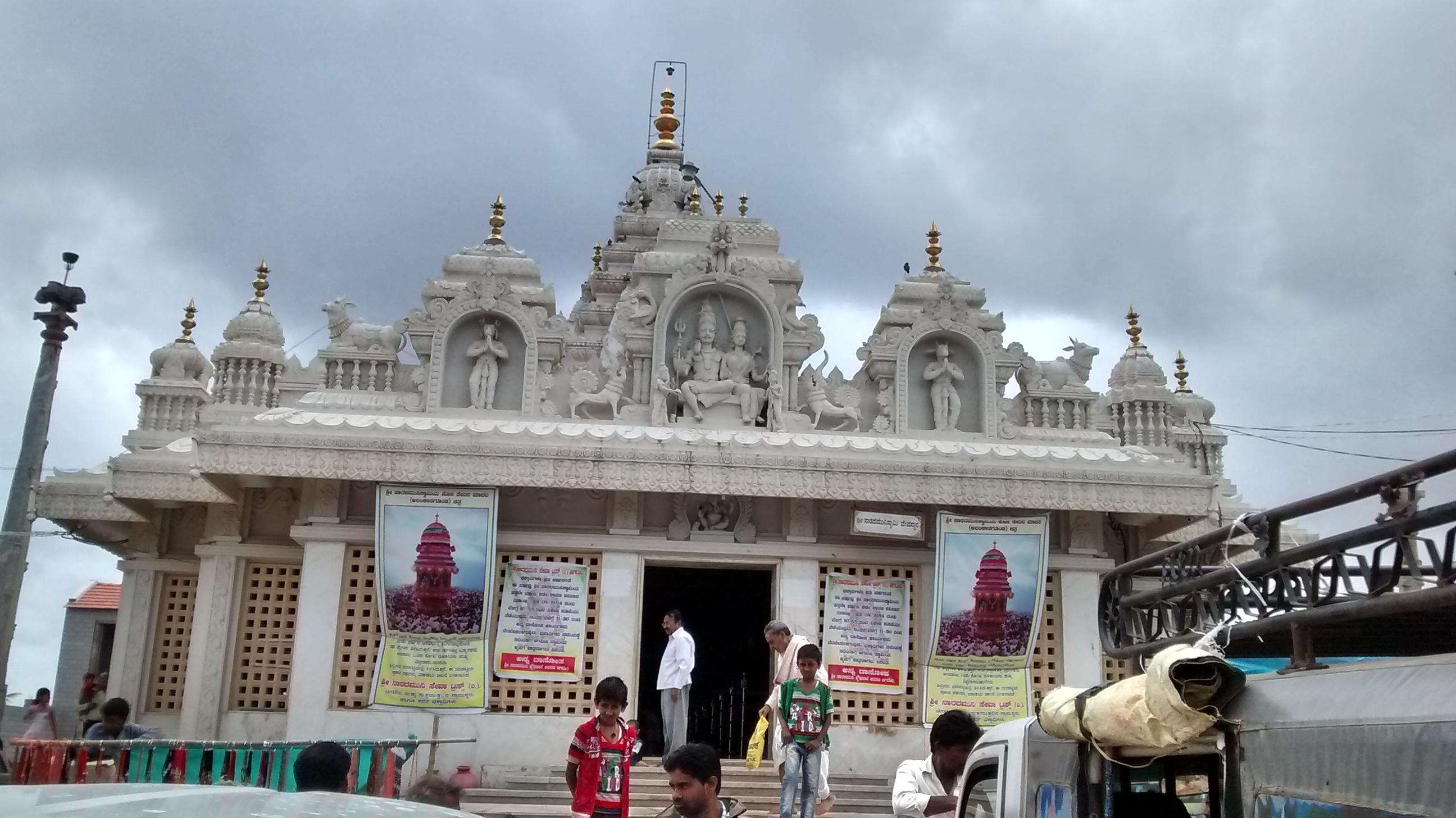
- Sri Shiva Narada Muni Temple

- Location in Karnataka

Religion
- Affiliation: Hinduism
- District: Vijayanagara
- Deity: Shiva Narada

Location
- Location: Chigateri
- State: Karnataka
- Country: India
- Coordinates: 14.8210°N 76.0893°E

Sri Shiva Narada Muni Temple is a Hindu temple situated at Chigateri in Karnataka state, India. It is one of the most prominent of the few temples dedicated to Narada Muni, a legendary divine sage in Hinduism considered to be the first journalist on Earth and the primary source of information for gods according to Hindu mythology.

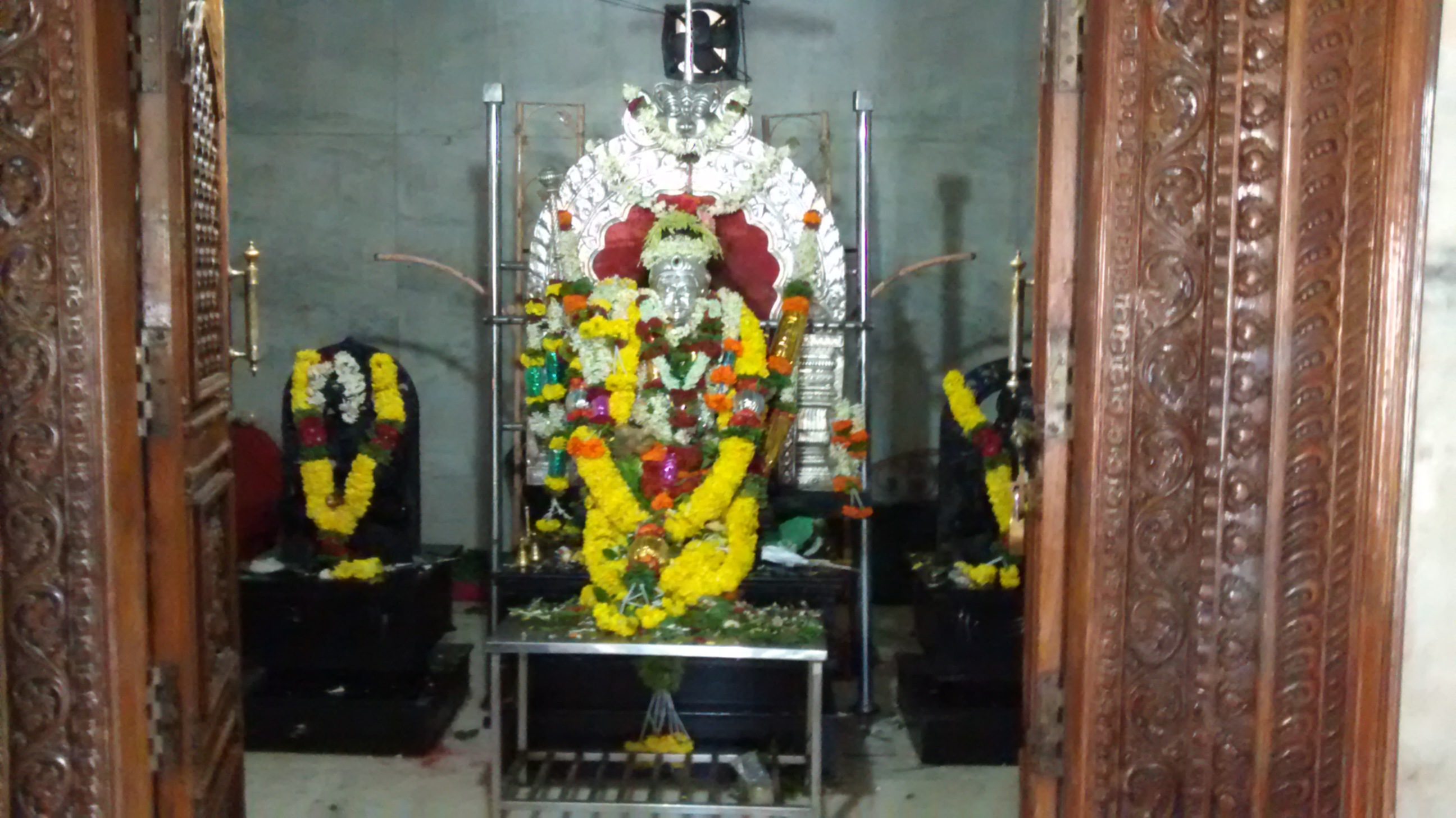
Idol of Narada Muni in the temple
