= Narada Jayanti =

Hindu festival observing the birthday of Narada

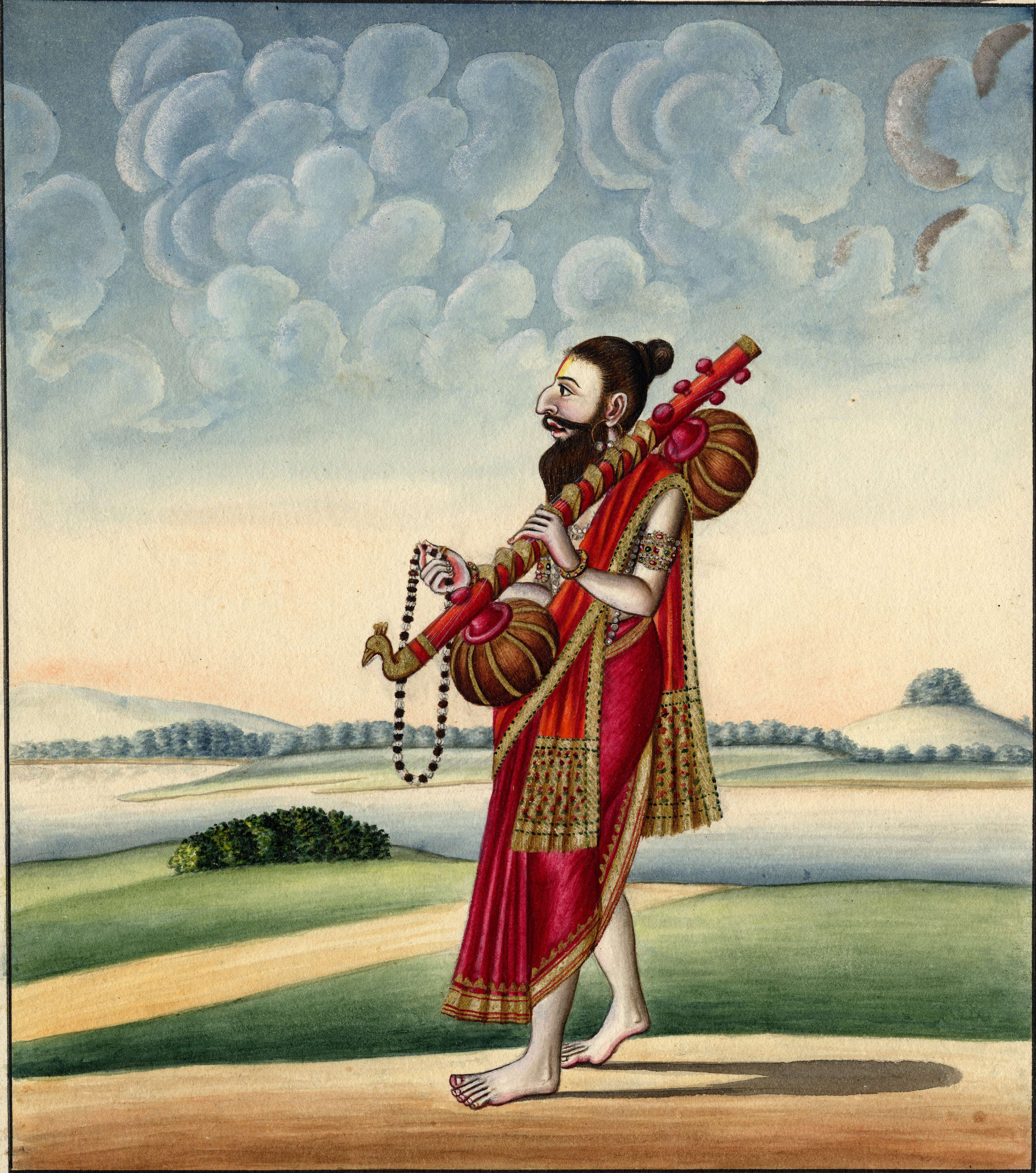
- Painting of Narada
- Date: May
- Frequency: Annually
- Previous event: 13 May 2025
- Next event: 2 May 2026
- Major events: Fasting

Narada Jayanti (Sanskrit: नारदजयंती, romanized: Nāradajayantī) is a Hindu festival observed to celebrate the birth of the celestial sage Narada. It is celebrated on the Pratipada Tithi of Krishna Paksha in the Hindu month of Jyestha across the Indian subcontinent.

== Background ==
According to Hindu texts, Narada is the manasaputra (mind-born son) of the creator deity Brahma. He is the seer of the thirteenth sutra of the eighth mandala of the Rigaveda. In Vaishnava tradition, he is considered a staunch devotee of Vishnu, singing his praises across the universe. In popular culture, he announces his arrival and greets deities by chanting a name of Vishnu, "Narayana, Narayana".

According to the texts like the Bhakti Purana, a number of important works are attributed to him, including the Narada Purana, Narada Smriti, and the Narada Bhakti Sutra.

=== Story of Narada Jayanti ===
According to a story, Narada was cursed to be born on the earth in his previous life when he was a gandharva. Due to the curse, he was born in a servant family. His father was a servant of a group of priests. Narada served those priests along with his father. Narada's diligence impressed the priests, and they gave him blessings and prasada (consecrated food) from Vishnu. Narada grew to become a dedicated devotee of Vishnu. After the death of his mother, he left his home and wandered in forest for the search of enlightenment. While he was meditating under a tree in the forest, Vishnu appeared there and informed Narada that he would assume his divine form only after his death. Narada dedicated his life to the service of Vishnu, the divine form of Narada was reborn after his death through the blessings of the deity.

== Observances ==
During Narada Jayanti, devotees participate in fasting, worship, and listening to stories of Narada. On this day, devotees bathe before the sunrise and fast for the whole day. They offer chandana (sandalwood), leaves of tulasi, agarbatti, flowers, and sweets to Narada and Vishnu. They distribute prasada in temples, and some distribute clothes to the poor. Devotees of Vishnu venerate Narada due to his knowledge, wisdom, and devotion to Vishnu. The devotees pray and wish for wisdom, knowledge and prosperity in their lives. It is believed that on this occasion, feeding Brahmins and giving donations to them brings virtuous results. Similarly, it is also believed that any one who recites the Narada Stotra on this day gains intelligence and is rid of their troubles. As Narada is also considered as a celestial journalist in Hinduism, a felicitation ceremony for journalists is organised by some social, cultural and media organisations on this day.
