= Parasara Bhattar =

Hindu theologian

Sri Parasara Bhattar Acharya

Personal life
- Home town: Srirangam
- Parents: Koorathalvar (father); Andal (mother)
- Era: 1062-1174 CE
- Region: Tamilakam
- Notable work(s): Sri Ranganatha Stotram; Srirangarajastavam; Bhagavadgunadarpana; Ashtashloki; Sri Guna Rana Kosa; Tirumanjana Kattiyam

Religious life
- Religion: Hinduism
- Denomination: Sri Vaishnavism
- Philosophy: Vishishtadvaita

Religious career
- Teacher: Embar
- Successor: Nanjiyar
- Influenced by: Ramanuja
- Influenced: Vedanta Desika

Parasara Bhattar (Tamil: பராசர பட்டர், romanized: Paraśara Bhattar), also called Periya Bhattar and Parashara Bhattarya, was a follower of Ramanuja and a 12th-century Sri Vaishnava teacher (1062-1174 CE). He was the son of Koorathalvar. His works include the Srirangarajastavam. He wrote a commentary in Sanskrit on the Vishnu Sahasranamam from a Sri Vaishnava viewpoint, titled the Bhagavadguna Dharpanam, in contrast to the Advaita view of Adi Shankara.

According to the Tenkalai tradition (Guru-parampara), Ramanuja was succeeded by his cousin Embar as the leader of Sri Vaishnavas, followed by Parasara Bhattar. Parasara defeated an Advaita Vedanta philosopher named Madhava in a debate. He accepted Madhava as a disciple, gave him the name Nanjiyar, and appointed him as his successor.

== Legend ==
=== Birth ===
According to Sri Vaishnava tradition, once, Koorathalvar went to bed without dinner because he had not obtained any alms that night due to rain, nor was there any food in his house. When his wife, Andal, heard the wind instrument tiruchinnam being blown to ritually announce the ceremonial consumption of temple offerings (prasadam) by the deity Ranganatha, she is said to have wondered if it was proper for the deity to partake of lavish food when his devotee (Koorathalvar) had gone to bed hungry. Ranganatha heard her thoughts, and dispatched his devotee, Uttamanambi, to prepare some food and take it to Koorathalvar. The theologian shared the food with his wife, and due to having consumed blessed food, Andal shortly gave birth to two sons, Sreeramapillai and Bhattar. Bhattar was offered the additional name Parasara by Ramanuja, after the great sage and the author of the Vishnu Purana (Parāśara).

=== Childhood and marriage ===
According to legend, Parasara Bhattar is regarded to have been raised in the sanctum sanctorum of the Ranganathaswamy Temple, where he is said to have consumed the milk offered to the deity. He is stated to have once come across a highly learned man who held the title sarvajña (omniscient) while playing in the street. The infant is described to have scooped some soil in both of his hands and asked the man what it contained. When the man stood nonplussed, Parasara Bhattar laughed, and stated that they were fistfuls of soil, and suggested that the man relinquish his title. When the learned man learnt of the prankster's age and identity, he marvelled at his precociousness, and took him to the care of his foster-parents, who performed rituals to protect him from harm. In another legend, he is described to have flawlessly recited teachings from the Vedas upon his parents' prompting, and complained that he was not learning anything new in his classes. Following his education, when he was of age to get married, Ranganatha himself is described to have contracted his parents' desired alliance, with a girl from Periyanambi's family. After his wedding, in an episode, Parasara Bhattar is described to have once visited Ranganatha twice, having been driven away by the deity first and welcomed the second time. Parasara Bhattar proclaimed that he felt as though were being welcomed by his own parents the second time, a mindset that the deity encouraged him to maintain.

== Philosophy ==
Parasara Bhattar believed in the co-divinity of Lakshmi Narayana, calling them 'Mother' and 'Father' and stating that their relationship was similar to that of the sun and sunlight. In his Sri Guna Ratna Kosa, he stated that the goddess Sri (Lakshmi) maintains the unique role of pleading the cause of mortal beings to her consort Narayana (Vishnu), encouraging him to be gracious to his followers. This idea was adopted by Vedanta Desika.

He believed that the recitation of the Vishnu Sahasranamam offers the absolution of sins and has no equal hymn.

He is said to have offered ten precepts to his disciple, Nanjiyar.

== Works ==
The Ashtashloki of Parasara Bhattar contains eight Sanskrit verses that are regarded to essentialise the three Sri Vaishnava mantras used in the performance of prapatti: the Tiru mantra, Dvaya mantra, and Carama sloka.

He is recorded to have written Sanskrit hymns (stotram) that glorify the images of Vishnu that were extolled by the poet-saints called the Alvars. According to Professor Friedhelm Hardy, he was among the acharyas who attempted to reconcile the traditions of Brahaman orthodoxy, the Pancharatra, and the devotional themes of the Alvars.
