= Goloka =

Celestial abode of Hindu deities Radha and Krishna

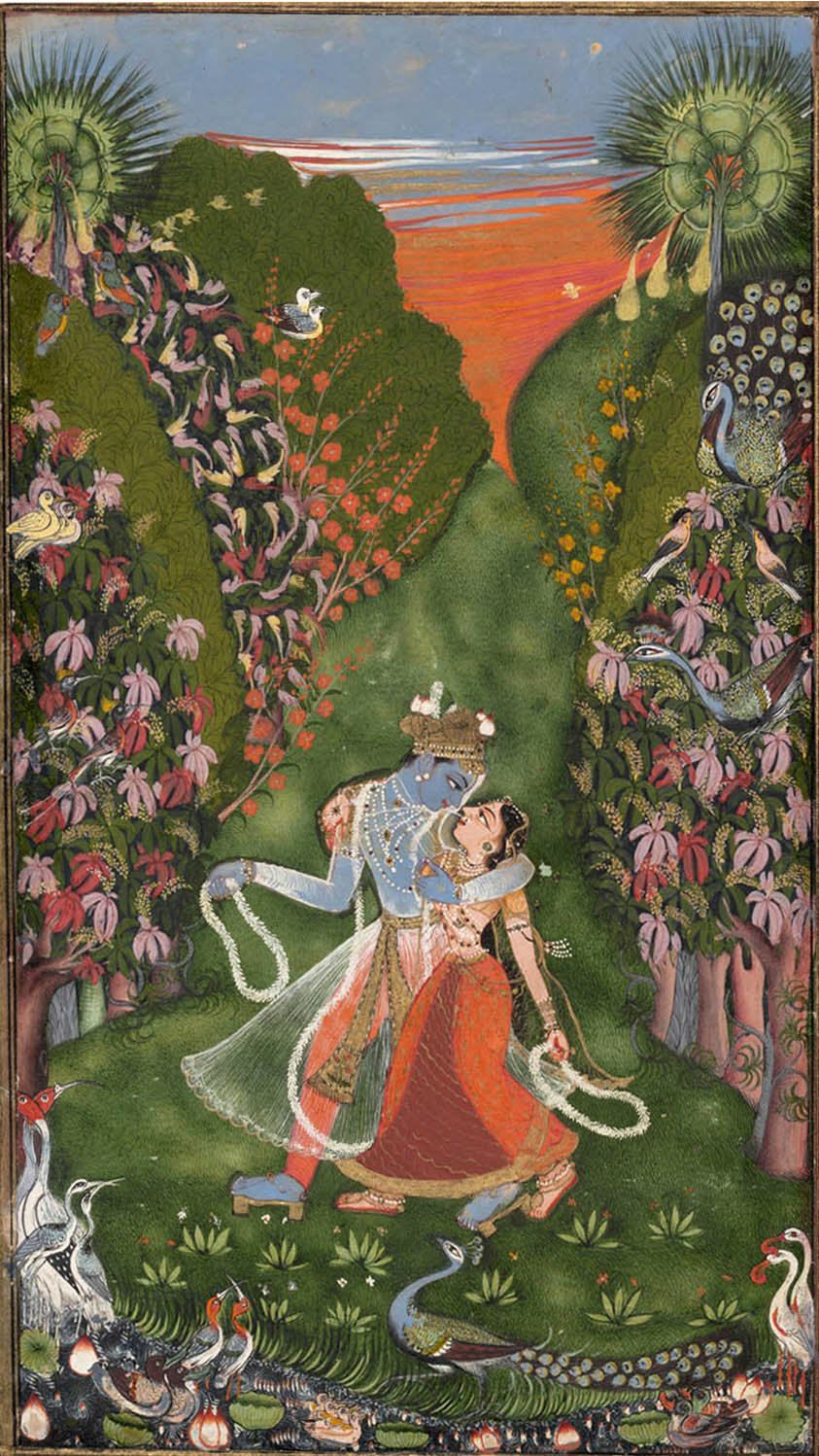
Radha Krishna, queen and king of Goloka

Goloka (Sanskrit: गोलोक) or Goloka Vrindavan (IAST: Goloka Vṛndāvana) is the celestial abode of the Hindu god Krishna and his chief consort Radha. In the Garga Samhita, Krishna is portrayed as the highest person who resides in Goloka along with Radha.

Goloka is often represented as the celestial realm containing flowing streams and lovely gardens, and is inhabited by cows and enchanting maidens – Gopis.

Besides Bhagvata Purana, Goloka is also mentioned in Sanskrit scriptures such as the Pancharatra texts, Garga Samhita, Brahma Samhita, Brahma Vaivarta Purana, and Devi-Bhagavata Purana.

== Etymology ==
Goloka literally means "World of cows". The Sanskrit word go refers to "cow" and loka is translated as "realm".

== Description ==
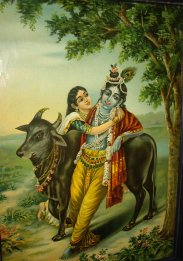
Painting of Radha and Krishna

According to Jiva Goswami, Goloka, also called Vrindavan, is the highest spiritual plane and can be further manifested into three abodes, called Mathura, Dvārakā and Gokul, according to the difference in the pastimes and associates of Krishna. Based on Rupa Goswami's Laghubhagavatamrita, Jiva Goswami asserts that Goloka is the transcendental prototype of the earthly Vrindavan, where Krishna performed his lilas. In both places, Krishna tends to cows.

A description of Goloka can be found in the Brahma Samhita, verse 5.29:

I worship Govinda, the primeval Lord, the first progenitor, who is tending the cows, yielding all desires, in abodes built with spiritual gems and surrounded by millions of purpose trees. He is always served with great reverence and affection by hundreds and thousands of devotees resembling goddesses of fortune.

— Brahma Samhita, Verse 5.29

Sanatana Goswami, an author of a number of important works in the bhakti tradition of Gaudiya Vaishnavism, states, "Sri Goloka is considered the ultimate destination of spiritual endeavour."

The Brahma Vaivarta Purana explicitly describes Goloka Vrindavan to be about 500 million yojanas (4 billion miles) above Vaikuntha loka and to expand to 30 million yojanas (240 million miles). The depiction is similar to a verse found in Brahma Samhita verse 5.43.

Acharyas of Gaudiya Vaishnavaism explain it to be limitless. Both Vaikuntha and Goloka are considered to be Nitya Dhama (the eternal realm of existence) which are not prone to annihilation even after the whole cosmic dissolution. Krishna in his two-armed form eternally resides in the realm of Goloka and in his four-armed form, as Vishnu he eternally resides in the realm of Vaikuntha loka.

== Literary sources ==
The Bhagavata Purana does not mention a supreme abode of Krishna, but later Vaishnava traditions have imagined one.

Mention of Goloka is found in other Puranas, such as Skanda Purana and Markandeya Purana. In Brihad-bhagavatamrita, Sanatana Goswami explains that this verse is quoted from the Skanda Purana and is spoken by Krishna to Arjuna:

Evam bahu-vidhai rupais caramiha vasundharam brahmalokam ca kaunteya golokam ca sanatanam.
"I move about in many forms on earth, in Brahmaloka, and in eternal Goloka, O Kaunteya."

In the Markandeya Purana, Krishna declares,

Golokam ca parityajya lokanam trana-karanat kalau gauranga-rupena lila-lavanya-vigrahah.
"In the Kali-Yuga, I will leave Goloka and, to save the people of the world, I will become the handsome and playful Lord Gauranga."

== See also ==
- Radha Krishna
- Vaikuntha
- Kailasha
