= Brahmaloka =

Abode of the Hindu god Brahma

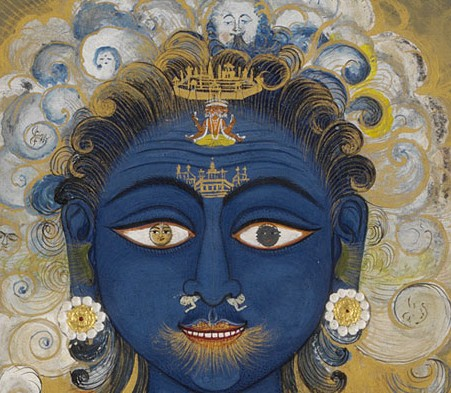
Brahmaloka, as seen on the head of Vishnu's Vishvarupa form as the Cosmic Man

Brahmaloka (Sanskrit: ब्रह्मालोक, IAST: Brahmāloka) or Satyaloka (Sanskrit: सत्यलोक) sometimes refers to the realm of Brahma, the creator god, a member of the Trimurti along with Vishnu and Shiva, along with his consort Saraswati. It is also referred to as Brahmapura, in the Puranas. Brahmaloka also refers to the abode of Brahman.

Brahmaloka is described to be 60,000,000 miles above the Prajapati loka and is considered to be of great soteriological significance. It is a sphere where the inhabitants never again know death, dwelling perpetually in the company of yogins, and drinking the excellent nectar of yoga.

== Location ==
In the center of Brahmaloka is Brahmapura, a huge palace where Brahma resides.

== In Hinduism ==
Ancient Hindu texts explain a layered vision of the universe. At the top side Brahmaloka, essentially the highest level possible. The texts posit a "temporary" heaven in which death is still possible. Brahmaloka is a "final heaven" that sits above even the realm of Indras and other gods.

Brahmaloka is a realm composed entirely of Brahman, considered superior to the Svarga loka and full of immortal energy, knowledge and bliss. It is also known as the planet of the Bhagavān.

The above statement shows that Brahmaloka is an eternal Vaikuntha that is neither created nor located within the material realm and is a home for the Supreme Soul.

Brahman-lokah esa atma-lokah "Brahmaloka is the planet of the Supreme Soul."

The Chandogya Upanishad says in 8:1

"Within the Brahmapura is an abode, a small lotus-flower within which is a small space (antarakasa). What is within that, should be searched out. That, assuredly, is what one should desire to understand."

In Chandogya Upanishad 8.4.3, Brahmaloka is mentioned as a realm that one achieves by living a life of brahmacarya:

So, only those who find this world of brahman (brahmaloka) by living the life of a celibate student (brahmacarya) come to possess that world, and they obtain complete freedom of movement in all the worlds.

== In Buddhism ==
In Buddhism, Brahmaloka refers to the highest celestial worlds in existence, the abode of the Brahmas. It consists of twenty heavens, namely:

- the three ordinary Brahma-worlds
- the three Śubhakṛtsna worlds
- the three Ābhāsvara worlds
- the two Bṛhatphala worlds
- the five Suddhāvāsā worlds,
- the four Arūpa worlds,

All except the four Arūpa worlds are classed among the Rūpa worlds (the inhabitants of which are corporeal). The inhabitants of the Brahmaloka are free from sensual desires. Brahmaloka consists only of higher devas or higher celestial beings called Brahmas and rebirth in the Brahma world is the result of great virtue due to meditation. The Jataka tales also contain various instances of ascetics who practiced meditation, being reborn after death in Brahmaloka. Furthermore, it is believed that while the rest of the world will be destroyed at the end of a Maha-Kalpa, the Brahmaloka will survive and that the first beings to be born on Earth will come from the ābhassara Brahma world. The Brahmās here are represented as visiting earth and taking an interest in the affairs of men. This is why Nārada descends from the Brahmaloka to dispel the heresies of King Angati in the Lord Brahma-Nārada tale in the Mahanipata Jataka.

=== Brahmaloka in Theravada Buddhism ===
Arupa worlds are the highest among all divine worlds Brahma worlds. Since the beings born in these Brahman worlds with very long lifespans are formless worlds, many Buddhas were born and preached the Dhamma, even if the beings are filled to the point of Ama Maha Nirvana, they do not get to hear the Dhamma. During the time when our great Bodhisattva was performing difficult tasks, Alara Kalama and Uddakaraputta, who were teachers, were born in these worlds after giving birth to Dhyana, so they did not get nirvana in this Buddha seat.

Those who have acquired formative meditation will be born in the formless Brahman worlds after death, and those who have attained higher formless meditation will be born in the formless Brahman worlds after death. For that, the Dhyanas acquired must die without deterioration. But worldly meditation taken as Ashtasamapatti can deteriorate. Therefore, those dhyanas acquired by meditating with vigor should be preserved without deterioration.

The kirya mind was born in connection with the rupavachara and arupavachara meditations associated with Buddhas and Arhats. These rupavachara, arupavachara meditation minds are also called Mahaggata minds in Abhidhamma. Meritorious minds, meritorious minds and meritorious minds are considered for those who are not arhats. Arhats will have milky hearts. There is no power of reciprocation in the mind. In this way, like the emotional mind, the Pratishandhi mind is also a Vipaka mind. That is, what is the purpose of the mind is also the purpose of the Pratishandhi mind. And among the above-mentioned Brahma worlds, there is also a Bambalo, where the fourth Dhyana Vaduvas are born as Asanjasanta. Sages, yogis who have grown into intense meditation, are born here and have only a physical body. There is no mind. Yogis take the mind out of the body by gradually focusing the mind on one goal at the same time as the fourth meditation. For this one must have strong mental concentration. This world of Brahma is born from animals in the same posture as when it was born from the world of man. Chaturtha Dhyanaddo should resolve to be born in this world of Brahman. Even though this is a metaphorical world, it should be abandoned when the specified life span is over. The reason for this is that the impermanence that affects other worlds is common to this world of Brahma. Also, when born in the worlds of Brahma, such as Suddhavasa, the lifespan is very long, so a noble person who has all the paramitas can listen to the teachings of a Buddha and see nirvana in the worlds of Brahma.

The Buddha says so because during the lifetime of the Brahman worlds, a large number of Buddhas appear in the world. All the Buddhas who appear in this way go to the world of snakes to preach the Dhamma.

And the nature and composition of the worlds of Brahma are as follows. That is the people of the great Brahma reside in the Brahma Parisajja. In the Brahma Purohita resides the advisors of the great Brahma The Great Brahman is the world where the Great Brahman resides. Phrathabhaya is a world of Brahman with dim light. The light of appamanabha spreads immeasurably. In Abhassara resides the Brahmas whose body light is very vast. In Paritta Subha dwells the Brahmans who spread their light in a little way. Brahman, who spreads the immeasurable light of the infinite bliss, closes. Brahmas who radiate unchanging bodily light in Subha Kinha reside. The Brahmins who have attained Mahatphala Mahanisamsa in Vehappala are closed. The Dhamma also mentions the above-mentioned body light as Khyama Prabhava.

According to Buddhism, the number of Brahma worlds Twenty is more than the number of divine worlds. According to the teaching of Buddhism, the details about Brahma Loka are given below.

=== rupāvacara brahma lōka ===
1. brahma pārisadya

2. brahma purōhitaya

3. mahā brahmaya

4. parittābhaya

5. appamānābhaya

6. ābhassaraya

7. parittasubhaya

8. appamāna subhaya

9. subhakiṇhaka

10.vehapphalaya

11.asaagna talaya

=== śuddhāvāsa brahma lōka ===
12. avīhaya

13. atappaya

14. sudassaya

15. sudassiya

16. akaniṣṭaya

=== arūpāvacara brahma lōka ===
17. ākāsañacāyatanaya

18. viññāacāyatanaya

19. ākicañāyatanaya

20. nēvasaññānāsaññāyatanaya

== See also ==
- Goloka
- Vaikuntha
- Brahman
- Paramatma
- Bhagavan
- Kailasha

== Sources ==
- Olivelle, Patrick (1998). The Early Upanishads: Annotated Text and Translation. Oxford University Press, USA. ISBN 978-0-19-512435-4.

== Literature ==
- Self-Realization Brahmaanubhava: The Advaitic Perspective of Shankara: Brahmaanubhava: The Advaitic Perspective of Shankara (Cultural Heritage and Contemporary Change. Series Iiib, South Asia, V. 4) von Vensus A. George von Council for Research in Values & (January 2001) - p. 103
- Sharma, Shubhra. Life In The Upanishads. Abhinav Publications; 1 edition (February 14, 2011)
- chhandogya upanishad as PDF
- Twitchell, Paul (1988) The Far Country. Illuminated Way Publishing. ISBN 0-914766-91-0
- Twitchell, The Far Country as PDF
