= Chigateri =

- Location in Karnataka, India
- Coordinates: 14.819950°N 76.0918100°E
- Country: India
- State: Karnataka
- District: Vijayanagara
- Taluk: Harapanahalli

Population (2011)
  - Total: 6,054

Languages
  - Official: Kannada
- Time zone: UTC+5:30 (IST)
- Postal code: 583 127
- Vehicle registration: KA 35

Chigateri is a village in the Harapanahalli taluk of Vijayanagara District of Karnataka, India.

Naradamuni temple is located there which has followers mainly from Davanagere, Vijayanagara, Ballari, Chitradurga, Haveri, Gadag, Koppala, Shivamogga districts of Karnataka and other states.

== See also ==
- Bellary
- Districts of Karnataka
