= Cintamani =

Wish-fulfilling mythical jewel within Dharmic traditions

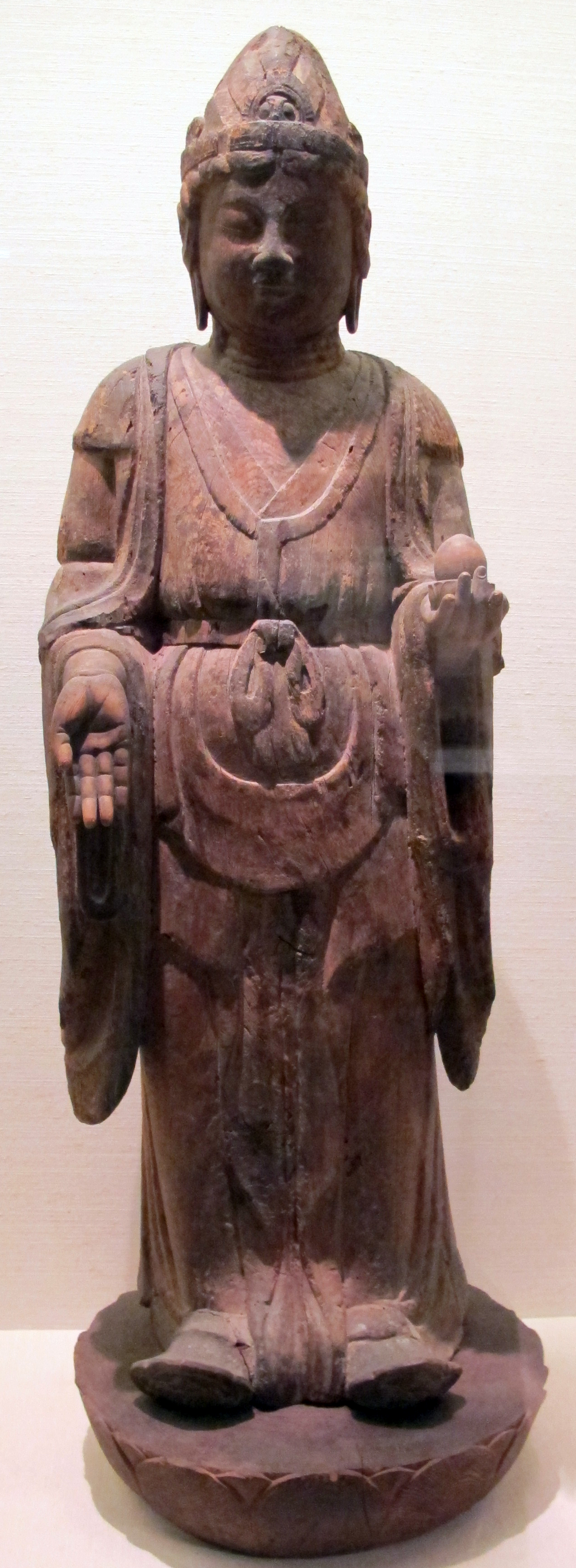
Japanese depiction of Lakshmi (Kichijōten), bearing the Cintāmani

Cintāmaṇi (Sanskrit; Devanagari: चिन्तामणि; Chinese: 如意寶珠; pinyin: Rúyì bǎozhū; Mongolian: Чандмань, romanized: Chandmani; Korean: 여의보주/Yeouiboju; Japanese Romaji: Nyoihōju), also spelled as Chintamani (or the Chintamani Stone), is a wish-fulfilling jewel resembling a pearl described in Hindu and Mahayana Buddhist traditions. It is one of several Mani Jewel images found in Buddhist scripture.

Within Hinduism, it is connected with the gods Vishnu and Ganesha. In Hindu tradition, it is often depicted as a fabulous jewel in the possession of Vishnu as the Kaustubha Mani or as on the forehead of the Naga king called as Naga Mani, or on the forehead of the Makara. The Yoga Vasistha, originally written in the 10th century CE, contains a story about the cintamani. The Hindu Vishnu Purana speaks of the "Syamanta jewel, bestowing prosperity upon its owner, encapsulates the Yadu clan system". The Vishnu Purana is attributed to the mid-first millennium CE.

In Buddhism, it is held by the Bodhisattvas (divine beings with great compassion, wisdom and power) Avalokiteśvara and Kṣitigarbha. It is also seen carried upon the back of the Lung Ta (wind horse) which is depicted on Tibetan prayer flags. By reciting the dharani (small hymn) of Cintamani, Buddhist tradition maintains that one attains the Wisdom of Buddha, able to understand the truth of the Buddha, and turn afflictions into Bodhi. It is said to allow one to see the Holy Retinue of Amitabha and assembly upon one's deathbed. In Tibetan Buddhist tradition the Chintamani is sometimes depicted as a luminous pearl and is in the possession of several of different forms of the Buddha.

In Japan, where the Hindu goddess Lakshmi is known as Kisshōten in Shinto, she is commonly depicted with a Cintāmaṇi in her hand.

== Etymology ==
Cintāmaṇi (Sanskrit; Devanagari: चिन्तामणि): 'Wish-Fulfilling Gem' (Tibetan: ཡིད་བཞིན་ནོར་བུ, Wylie: yid bzhin nor bu) The mani (jewel) is translated in Chinese ruyi or ruyizhu 如意珠 "as-one-wishes jewel" or ruyibaozhu 如意寶珠 "as-one-wishes precious jewel". Ruyibaozhu is pronounced in Japanese nyoi-hōju or nyoi-hōshu 如意宝珠. Ruyizhu is pronounced in Korean yeouiju 여의주.

== Hinduism ==
The Brihad Bhagavatamrita compares this gem with devotion towards Vishnu:

स-प्रेमका भक्तिर् अतीव-दुर्लभा स्वर्गादि-भोगः सुलभोऽभवश् च सः ।

चिन्तामणिः सर्व-जनैर् न लभ्यते लभ्येत काचादि कदापि हातकम् ॥ २३२ ॥

sa-premakā bhaktir atīva-durlabhā svargādi-bhogaḥ sulabho'bhavaś ca saḥ | cintāmaṇiḥ sarva-janair na labhyate labhyeta kācādi kadāpi hātakam || 232 ||

Anyone can obtain a piece of glass and sometimes a piece of gold, but not everyone can obtain a cintāmaṇi because it is most rare. Similarly, the pleasures of heaven and liberation are easily achieved, but prema-bhakti is extremely rare.

— Brihad Bhagavatamrita, Verse 2.4.232

The Bhagavata Purana remarks that the cintamani may give worldly pleasures and affluence in Svarga, but spiritual advancement allows one to attain Vaikuntha, the realm of Vishnu that is difficult to achieve, even for yogins. The Kintamani mountainous region in Bali was named after the Cintamani.

== Buddhism ==
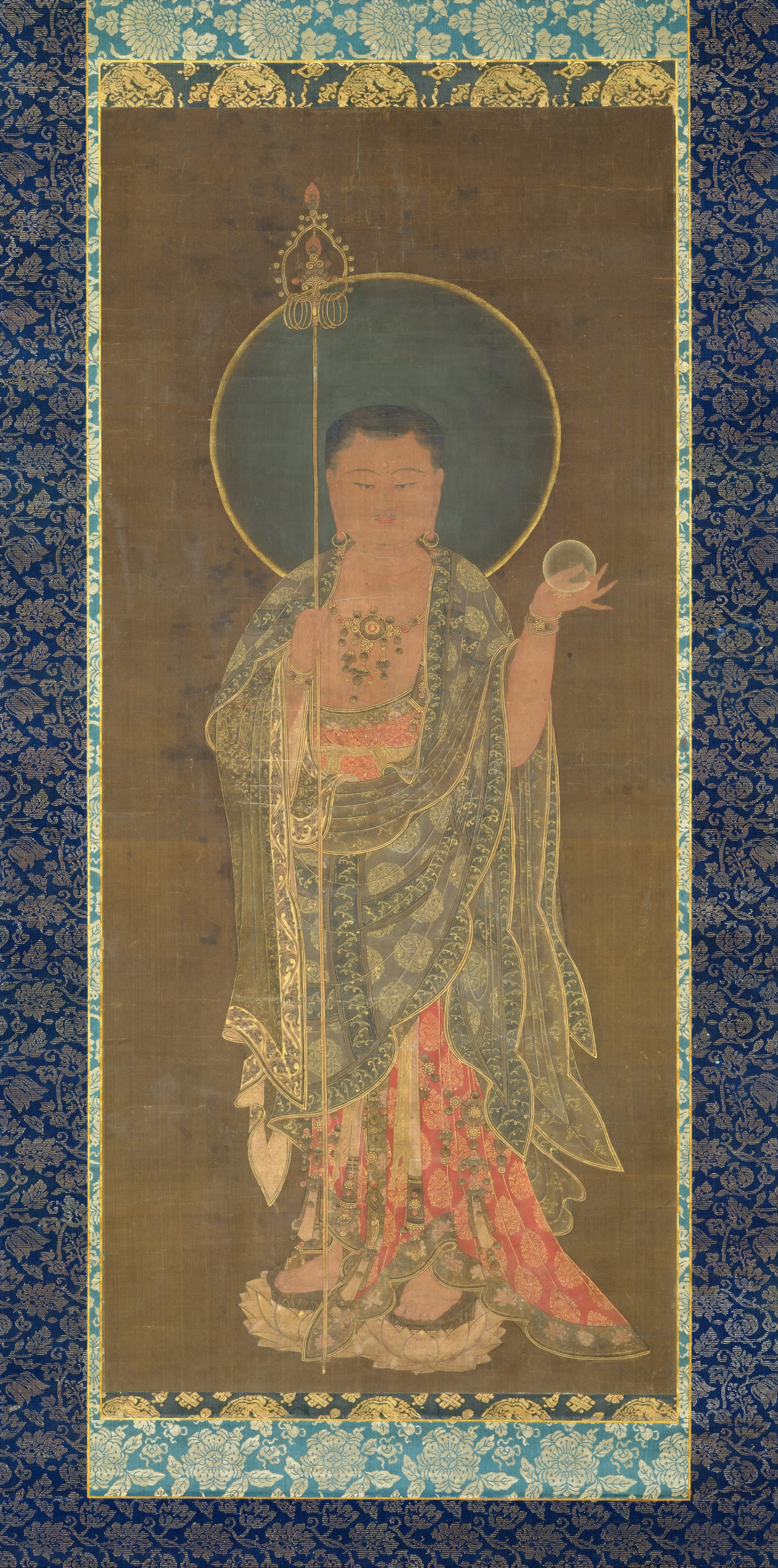
14th century Goryeo painting of Ksitigarbha holding a cintamani

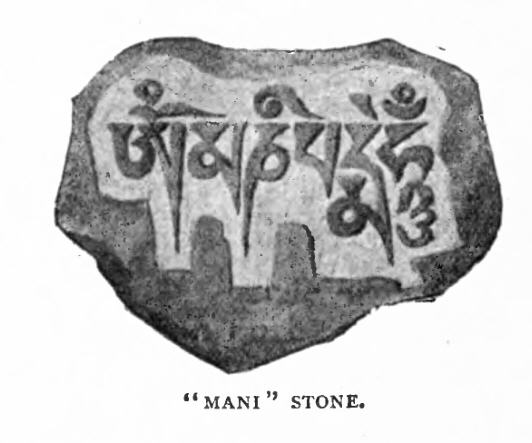
Mani stone

In Buddhism, the wish fulfilling jewel (Skt. maṇi, cintā-maṇi, cintāmaṇi-ratna) is an important mythic symbol indicating a magical jewel that manifests one's wishes, including the curing of disease, purification of water, granting clothing, food, treasure etc. It is a common symbol for the teachings and qualities of the Buddha.

One of the manifestation of Avalokitesvara is named Cintāmaṇicakra and holds a Cintāmaṇi.

In Tibetan Buddhism the Cintāmaṇi is said to be one of four relics that came in a chest that fell from the sky (many terma fell from the sky in caskets) during the reign of king Lha Thothori Nyantsen of Tibet. Though the king did not understand the purpose of the objects, he kept them in a position of reverence. Several years later, two mysterious strangers appeared at the court of the king, explaining the four relics, which included the Buddha's bowl and a mani stone with the Om Mani Padme Hum mantra inscribed on it. These few objects were the bringers of the Dharma to Tibet.

== Perennialism ==
René Guénon considered the Cintāmaṇi to be the equivalent of the philosopher's stone.

== See also ==
- Ark of the Covenant
- Ashtamangala
- Cornucopia
- Eight Treasures
- Holy Chalice
- Holy Grail
- Three hares
- Kagome crest – A 6-pointed star and an 8-pointed star; a symbol also associated with the goddess Kisshoten
- Kisshoutennyo (吉祥天女) Lakshmi/Kisshōtennyo.
- Kaustubha Gem
- List of mythological objects
- Luminous gemstones
- Mani stone
- Nicholas Roerich
- Philosopher's stone
- Sampo
- Śarīra
- Sendai Daikannon statue
- Shintai
- Syamantaka Gem
- Tide jewels
- Mitama
- Yasakani no Magatama

== Bibliography ==
- Beer, Robert (1999). The Encyclopedia of Tibetan Symbols and Motifs (Hardcover). Shambhala. ISBN 1-57062-416-X, ISBN 978-1-57062-416-2
- Buswell, Robert Jr; Lopez, Donald S. Jr., eds. (2013). "Cintamani", in Princeton Dictionary of Buddhism. Princeton, NJ: Princeton University Press. ISBN 9780691157863.
