= Koorathalvar =

Hindu theologian

Personal life
- Born: 1010 CE Kuram, near Kanchipuram, Tamil Nadu, India.

Religious life
- Religion: Hinduism
- Philosophy: Vishishtadvaita

Religious career
- Teacher: Ramanuja

Koorathalvar (Tamil: கூரத்தாழ்வார், romanized: Kūrattāḻvār) was a Hindu scholar of the Sri Vaishnava tradition, and the foremost disciple of the philosopher-saint Ramanuja.

== Biography ==
=== Early life ===
According to Sri Vaishnava tradition, Koorathalvar was born as Kuresan (or Srivatsanka) in the village of Kuram, near Kanchipuram in present-day Tamil Nadu, into a wealthy, landowning Brahmin family. He married Andal (Note: Not to be confused with the poet-saint and Alvar Andal) (Andalamma) and had two sons, Parasara Bhattar and Veda Vyasa Bhattar. The couple were known for philanthropy and devotion to the deity Varadharaja Perumal, the regional form of Vishnu.

=== Meeting Ramanuja ===
Kuresan became a disciple of Ramanuja while the latter was still in Kanchipuram. According to tradition, one night, Varadharaja Perumal and his consort Perundevi heard the heavy sound of the brass doors of Kuresan’s house being closed after he had finished his daily routine of feeding the poor. The deity is said to have appeared in a dream to the chief priest and ordered him to bring Kuresan to the temple. On hearing this, instead of feeling glad, Kuresan was distressed, believing that the noise of his charity had disturbed the divine couple at night. After Ramanuja settled in Srirangam, Kuresan and his wife renounced their wealth and joined him there. He served as a close attendant and scholarly collaborator, assisting him with spiritual study, management of the temple, and philosophical compositions.

=== Journey to Kashmir ===
One of the best-attested traditional episodes about Koorathalvar concerns the composition of Ramanuja’s commentary on the Brahma Sutras, the Sri Bhashya. Ramanuja sought access to the rare Bodhayana-vritti (an early gloss on the Brahma Sutras). Tradition holds that he and Kuresan travelled to Kashmir, where the text was held in a royal or temple library. Local scholars restricted removal or note-taking; Kuresan, reputed to possess an exceptional memory, is said to have memorised the available text (or an abridgement of it). On their return he recited it, allowing Ramanuja to complete the Sri Bhashya. Modern scholarship holds that only fragments of Bodhayana’s work survive (mainly via quotations in the Sri Bhashya itself) and that the journey and memorisation episode belong to hagiographical literature.

=== Literary works ===
Koorathalvar is the author of five Sanskrit stotras (odes) collectively known as the Panchastavi:

- Sri Vaikuntha Stavam
- Atimanusha Stavam
- Sundarabahu Stavam
- Varadharaja Stavam
- Sri Stavam

=== Meeting the Chola King ===
Sri Vaishnava hagiographies such as the Guruparamparaprabhava narrate that a Chola king hostile to Vaishnavism (traditionally called Krimikantha Chola and variously identified with Kulottunga I or Kulottunga II) summoned Ramanuja and demanded him to accept the supremacy of Shiva. Kuresan, disguised in Ramanuja’s robes and accompanied by the elderly Mahapurna (Periya Nambi), appeared in his place. When they refused to obey the king, both were blinded (in some versions Kuresan is said to have put out his own eyes). Mahapurna died of his injuries, while Kuresan survived. Ramanuja meanwhile withdrew to the Hoysala country (Melkote/Thondanur region) for roughly twelve years. After the king’s death, Ramanuja returned to Srirangam. According to legend, Kuresan’s sight was divinely restored by Varadharaja Perumal of Kanchipuram.

=== Later life and legacy ===
Koorathalvar continued to assist Ramanuja after the latter's return. He is said to have died in Srirangam in the presence of his family while Ramanuja was still alive. His sons, especially Parasara Bhattar, became leading figures in the Sri Vaishnava community.
