= Kailasha =

Celestial abode of Shiva in Hinduism

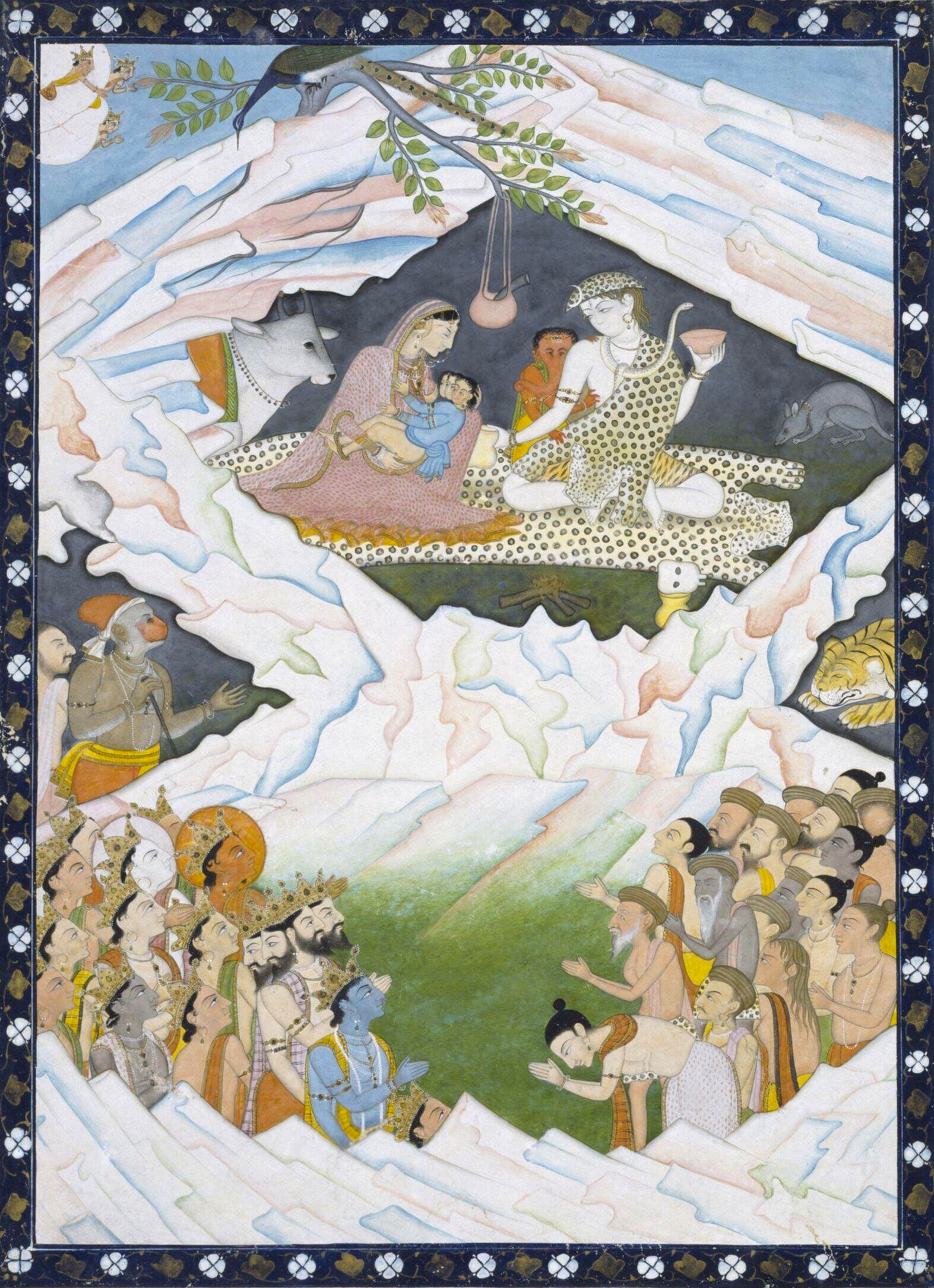
An illustration depicting Shiva with his family at Kailasha

Kailasha or Kailasa (IAST: Kailāsa) is the celestial abode of the Hindu god Shiva. It is traditionally recognized as a mountain where Shiva resides along with his consort Parvati, and their children, Ganesha and Kartikeya. Mount Kailash, located in the Transhimalaya, in the western part of the Tibetan Plateau, is considered as a geographic manifestation of Kailasha.

== Etymology ==
The name is given as "Kailāsa" (कैलास; var. Kailāśa कैलाश) in Sanskrit. It could have been derived from the word "kelāsa" (केलास), which means "crystal".

== Theology and mythology ==
The abode of Kailasha is said to be guarded by a set of ganas led by Nandi, the vahana (mount) of Shiva. According to the Puranas, Shiva and Parvati are often described as engaged in discussions regarding Hindu philosophies seated in Kailasha. Other gods and devas are described as assembling at Kailasha to witness Shiva taking the form of Nataraja and engaging in a cosmic dance.

Hindus believe Kailasha to be the Mount Meru which is considered to be a stairway to Svarga, a heaven where the devas reside. Meru is considered as the center of the universe and is said to be 139,440 km (86,640 mi) high, connecting the earth with the under world and heaven with Shiva residing on top of the mountain.

According to the Mahabharata, Kailasha is located amidst the Himavat range between Malayavat and Gandhamadhana mountains. Some scriptures indicate that Shiva resides in a horn of the mountains called as Saivatra. The text further states that the mountain gleans of gold when the rays of the sun fall on it and is said to contain lovely woods, lakes, rivers adorned with fruit trees, precious stones and life saving herbs. It also describes Kailasha as the means to reach heaven and only a being without any sins would be able to scale it. Kailasha is said to have a golden gate nearby a lake called Alaka adorned with golden lotuses and sweet tasting water from which Mandakini river arises. As per the Mahabharata, the Pandavas, along with their wife Draupadi, traveled towards the summit of Kailasha as a means to reach heaven, but only Yudhishthira, who was accompanied by a dog, was able to make it.

The Hindu epic Ramayana describes Kailasha and Lake Manasarovar as places unlike anywhere in the world. It also uses Kailasha as a reference to describe the mountains of Kishkindha. According to the Uttara Kanda of the epic, it is said that Ravana attempted to uproot Kailasha as retaliation against Shiva, who in turn, pressed his right big toe upon the mountain, trapping Ravana in between. This representation of Shiva is also referred to as Ravananugraha (meaning "form showing favour to Ravana") while seated upon his abode at Kailasha.

The Vishnu Purana states that Kailasha is a pillar of the world, located at the heart of six mountain ranges symbolizing a lotus. It also states that the four faces of Mount Kailasha are made of crystal, ruby, gold, and lapis lazuli. It further talks about Shiva sitting in a lotus position, engaged in deep meditation within the confines of the mountain. The mountain is home to four lakes, whose water is shared by the gods and four rivers that originate from the Ganges and flow to the earth. The Vayu Purana describes similarly with the mountain located close to a lake consisting of clear water with lotuses and lilies decked with water birds. The Bhagavata Purana places Kailasha as located south of Mount Meru. The Skanda Purana mentions the lake Manasarovar with Kailasha and describes the abode as located on the highest peak, perpetually covered with snow. The Kumārasambhava and the Meghadūta by Kālidāsa also have similar descriptions of Kailasha.

== Geographical location ==
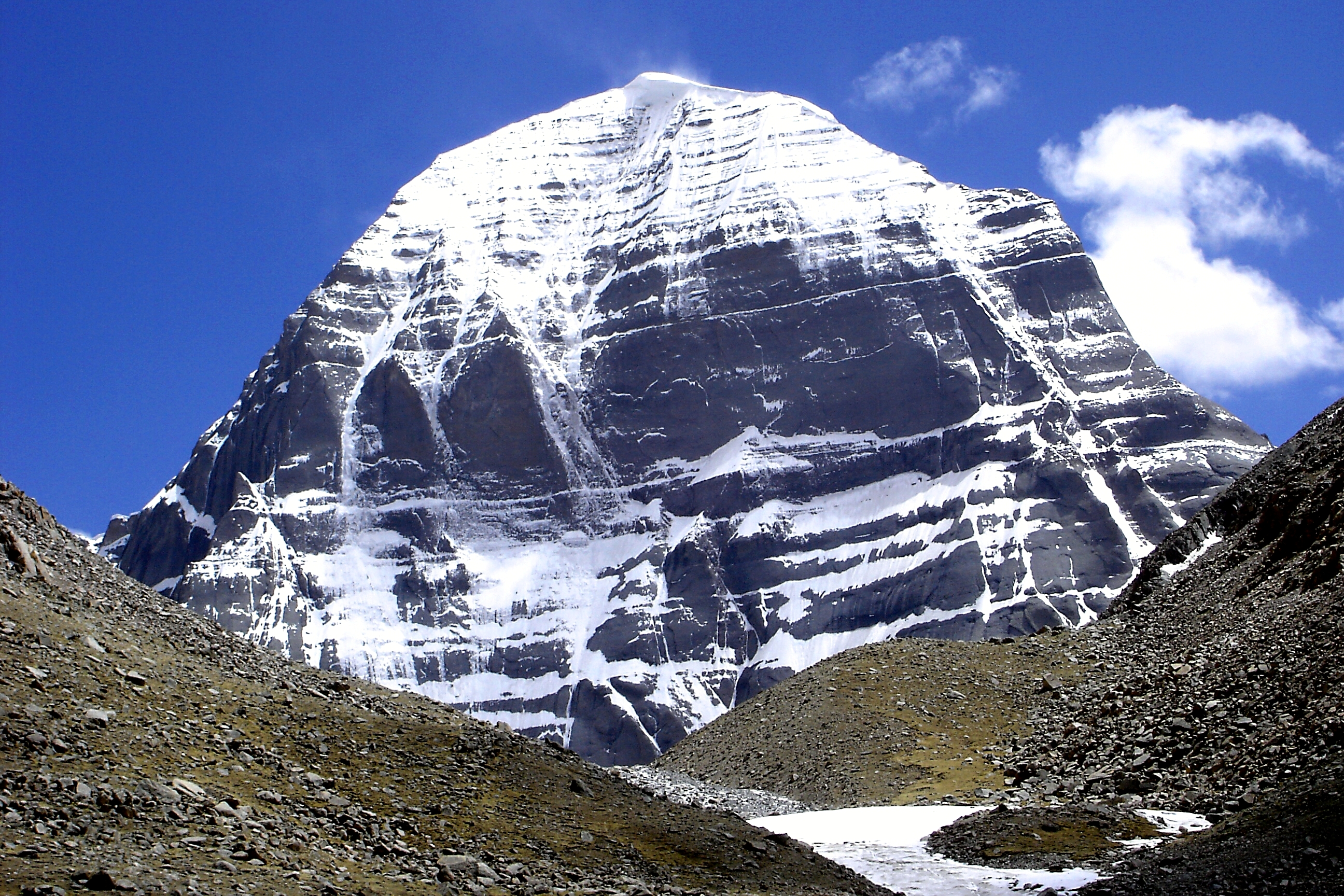
Mount Kailasha, located in the Transhimalaya, is often considered to be a geographic manifestation of Kailasha

Mount Kailasha, located in the Kailasha Range (Gangdisê Mountains) of the Transhimalaya in the western part of the Tibetan Plateau, is considered to be a geographic manifestation of Kailasha and is considered sacred in Hinduism. Multiple rivers originate from these mountains including the Yarlung Tsangpo (which becomes the Brahmaputra), the Indus, the Sutlej and the Karnali, a tributary of Ganges. All these river systems originate in a 60 km^{2} (23 sq mi) area in the Kailasha region. Kailasha is located close to Manasarovar and Rakshastal lakes. Mansarovar is a high altitude fresh water lake fed by glaciers and overflows into Rakshastal, an endorheic salt water lake.

Due to its perceived sacredness, people from India, Nepal and other countries undertake a pilgrimage called yatra to the mountain. The pilgrimage involves trekking towards Lake Manasarovar and a circumambulation of Mount Kailasha. The path around Mount Kailasha is 53 km (33 mi) long. Pilgrims believe that doing a circumambulation of Mount Kailasha on foot is a spiritually beneficial practice that can bring various positive effects, such as the collection of meritorious karma, the cleansing of sins from one's consciousness, and good fortune. The circumambulation is made in a clockwise direction by the Hindus.

== See also ==
- Akaniṣṭha
- Brahmaloka
- Goloka
- Manidvipa
- Vaikuntha
