= Narada =

Sage in Hindu mythology

- Divine Sage; Messenger of the Devas
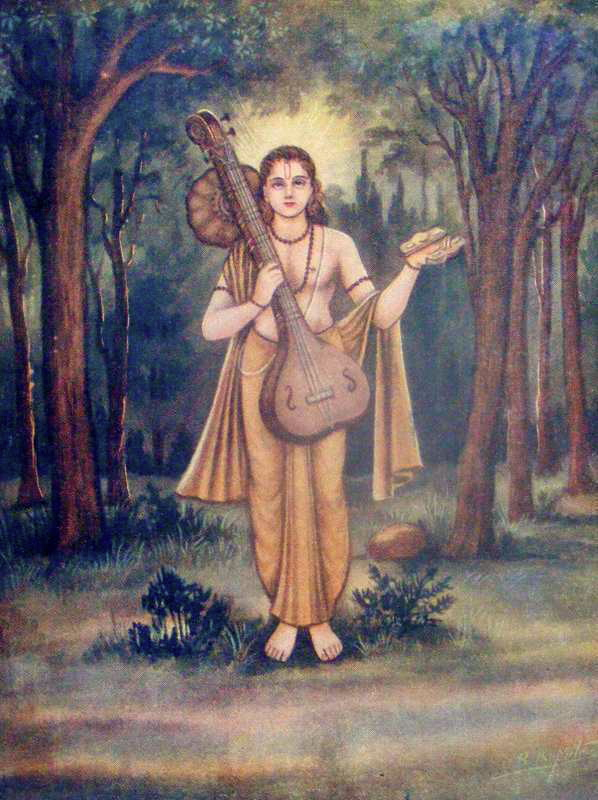
- Sage Narada
- Devanagari: नारद
- Affiliation: Vaishnavism; Devotee of Vishnu
- Abode: Brahmaloka; Vaikuntha
- Mantra: Om Naradaya Namah
- Symbols: Khartal; Veena; Mahati

Genealogy
- Born: Narada Jayanti
- Parents: Brahma (father)
- Siblings: Himavat, Jambavan

Narada (Sanskrit: नारद, IAST: Nārada), or Narada Muni, is a sage-divinity, who, in Hindu tradition was a travelling musician and storyteller, who carries news, enlightening wisdom and glories of God. He is one of the mind-created children of Brahma, the creator god.

According to Hindu mythology, Narada, being the universal divine messenger, is the primary source of information among gods and is considered the first journalist on Earth. He appears in a number of Hindu texts, notably the Mahabharata, telling Yudhishthira the story of Prahlada, and he also appears in the Ramayana and the Puranas. A common theme in Vaishnavism is the accompaniment of a number of associates such as Narada to serve Vishnu upon his descent to earth to combat the forces of evil, or to enjoy a close view of epochal events. He is also referred to as Rishiraja, meaning the king of all sages. Narada has the ability to visit all the three worlds: Akasha (heaven), Prithvi (Earth) and Patala (underworld). He is gifted with the boon of knowledge regarding the past, present, and the future. As per the Hindu calendar, Narada Jayanti, the birthday of Narada, is observed on Pratipada Tithi during Krishna Paksha of the month Jyeshtha.

== Hinduism ==
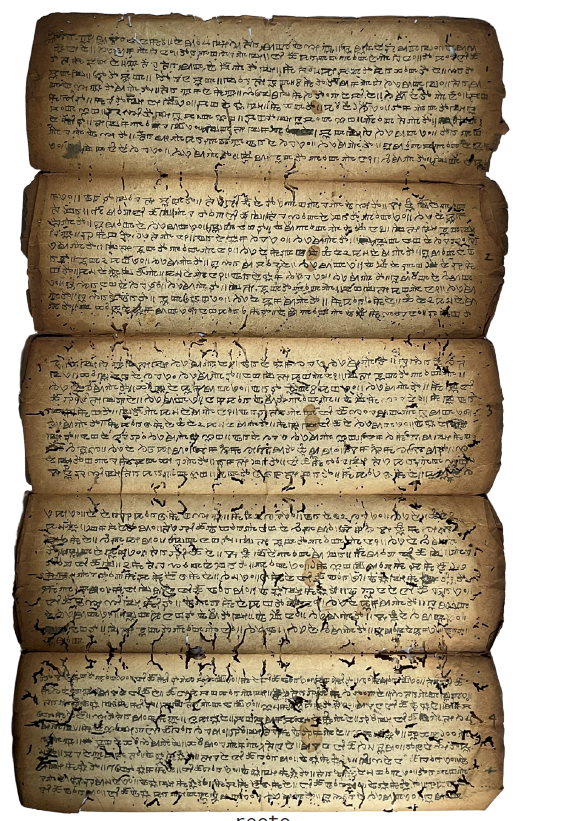
Narda Gita (alias Narot Gita or Narad Gita), a Meitei language manuscript text, about Narada

In Indian texts, Narada travels to distant worlds and realms (Sanskrit: lokas). He is depicted carrying a khartal (musical instrument) and the veena, and is generally regarded as one of the great masters of the ancient musical instrument. This instrument is also known by the name "mahathi",

The Shiva Purana describes a legend in which Narada's penance alarmed Indra, who sent Kamadeva to disturb his austerities. Due to the fact that the sage was meditating in the Himalayas and under Shiva's favour, he was protected by the deity's maya (illusory power) and hence remained undisturbed. When Narada learnt of this, still confounded by Shiva's maya, he falsely attributed this event to his own mental prowess and grew proud of his achievement. Heeding Shiva's suggestion to break the pride of the sage, Vishnu praised the qualities of Narada, but also warned him to not be delusional. The sage turned a deaf ear to this warning. Vishnu extended Shiva's maya to create a great and prosperous city in Narada's path. The king of the city, Shilanidhi, introduced his beautiful daughter, Shrimati—also known as Vishwamohini—to the sage, who grew desirous of marrying her. Shrimati was none other than an incarnation of Lakshmi. Narada travelled to Vaikuntha, requesting Vishnu to grant him the deity's form so that Shrimati would choose the sage as her husband during her svayamvara ceremony. Vishnu promised to grant Narada what would be beneficial for him, granting him his own form, but the face of a monkey. Believing his wish had been granted, Narada grew assured that Shrimati would choose him, but soon realised what had transpired. Vishnu attended the ceremony in the form of a king, and Shrimati chose him as her husband instead. Enraged, Narada cursed Vishnu to also be separated from the woman he loved and would only be saved by one with a monkey-face. When his maya was dispelled, Narada begged forgiveness from Vishnu. The deity instructed the sage to visit the abodes and praise the qualities of Shiva, and the latter journeyed to the deity's abode in Kashi.

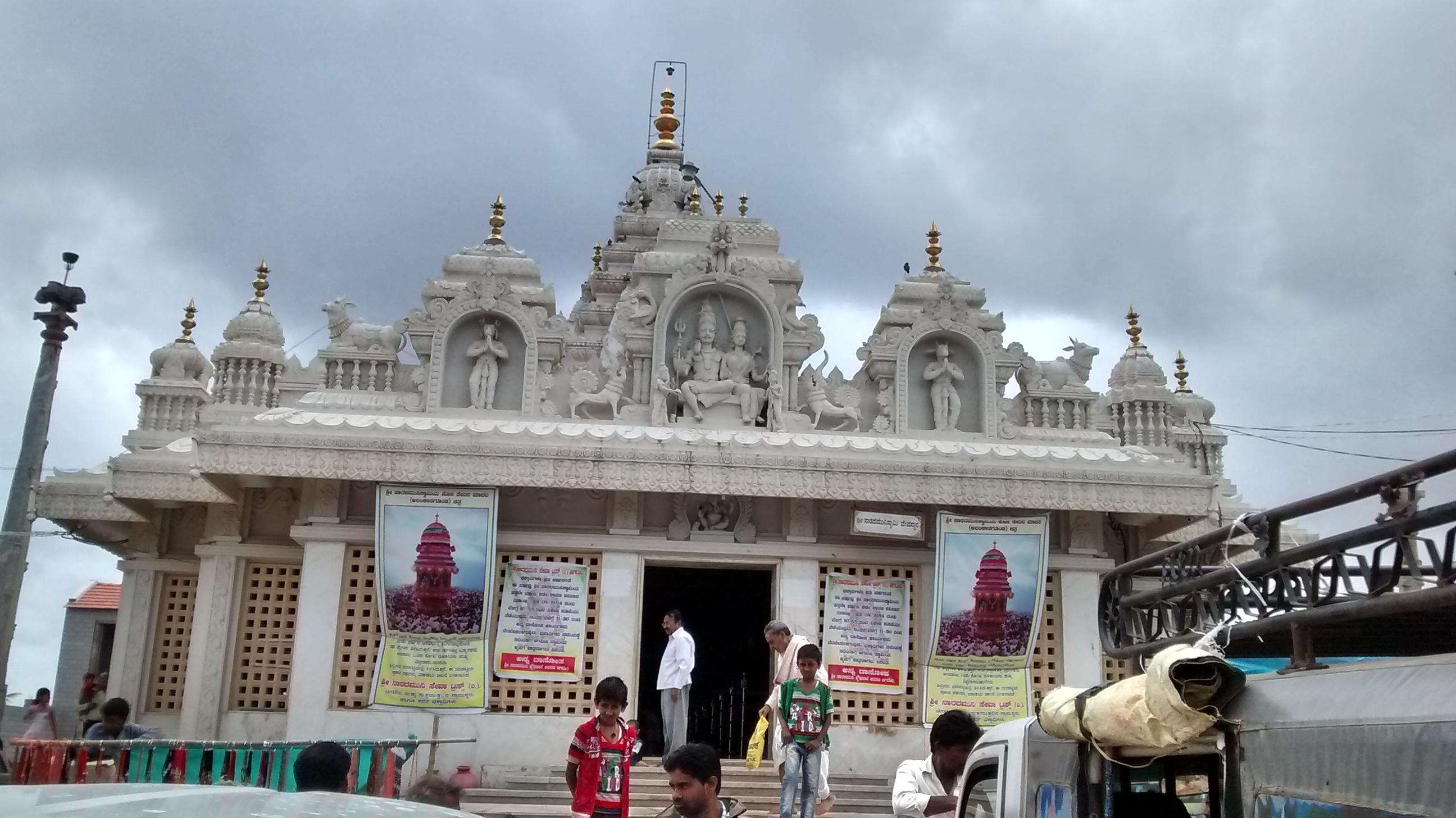
Sri Narada Muni Temple, Chigateri

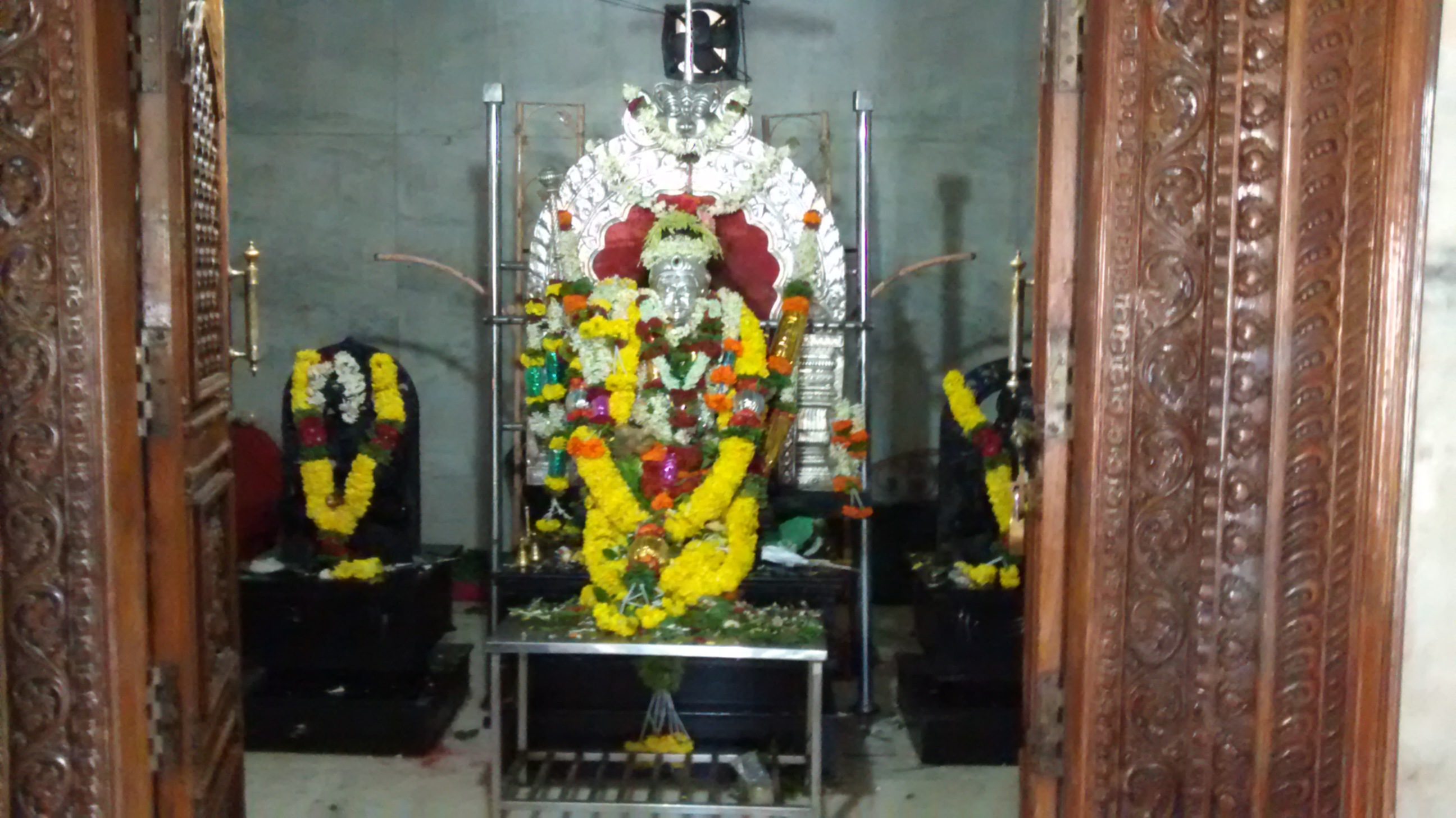
Idol of Narada Muni at the Chigateri Narada Muni Temple

In the Devi Bhagavata Purana and some other texts, Narada enquired Vishnu about the nature and greatness of maya. The deity guided him towards a lake, in which the sage took a bath. The sage was transformed into a woman. She married a king named Taladhvaja and was a mother to his many sons. After some time, Vishnu dispelled the illusion and restored Narada to his true male form. Narada came to understand the concept better, but concluded it was still mysterious to him.

== Worship ==
Some adherents believe that it was Narada who was reborn as Purandara Dasa as a Haridasa (servant of Vishnu). He emphasised his works on Vithala, another form of Vishnu and the presiding deity of the temple in Pandharpur.

== Jainism ==
In Jainism, there are a total of 9 Naradas in every cycle of Jain Cosmology;

== See also ==
- Bhaktha Naradar
- Bhagavata Purana
- Narada Bhakti Sutra
- Nāradasmṛti
- Sangita Makarandha
- Four Kumaras

== Sources ==
- Doniger, Wendy, ed. (1999), Encyclopedia of World Religions, Merriam-Webster, ISBN 0-87779-044-2
- Lariviere, Richard W. (1989). The Nāradasmr̥ti. University of Philadelphia.
