= Akshat =

Akshat is a male given name in Hindu and Buddhist cultures. It is derived from the Sanskrit word Aksata meaning 'uninjured'.

Notable people with the name include:

- Akshat Chandra (born 1999), American chess prodigy
- Akshat Chopra, Indian film actor, model and dancer
- Akshat Khamparia (born 1989), Indian chess International Master
- Akshat Pandey (born 1993), Indian cricketer
- Akshat Raghuwanshi (born 2003), Indian cricketer
- Akshat Singh (born 2005), Indian dancer
- Akshat Verma, Indian film director and screenwriter
