= Kaustubha =

Divine gemstone in Hindu mythology

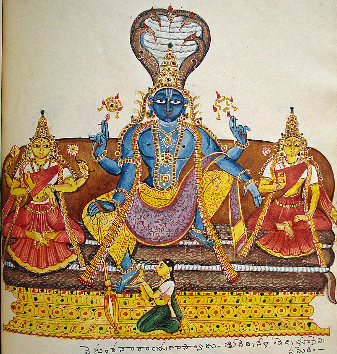
Painting of Vishnu wearing the kaustubha, accompanied by Sridevi, Bhudevi, and Niladevi

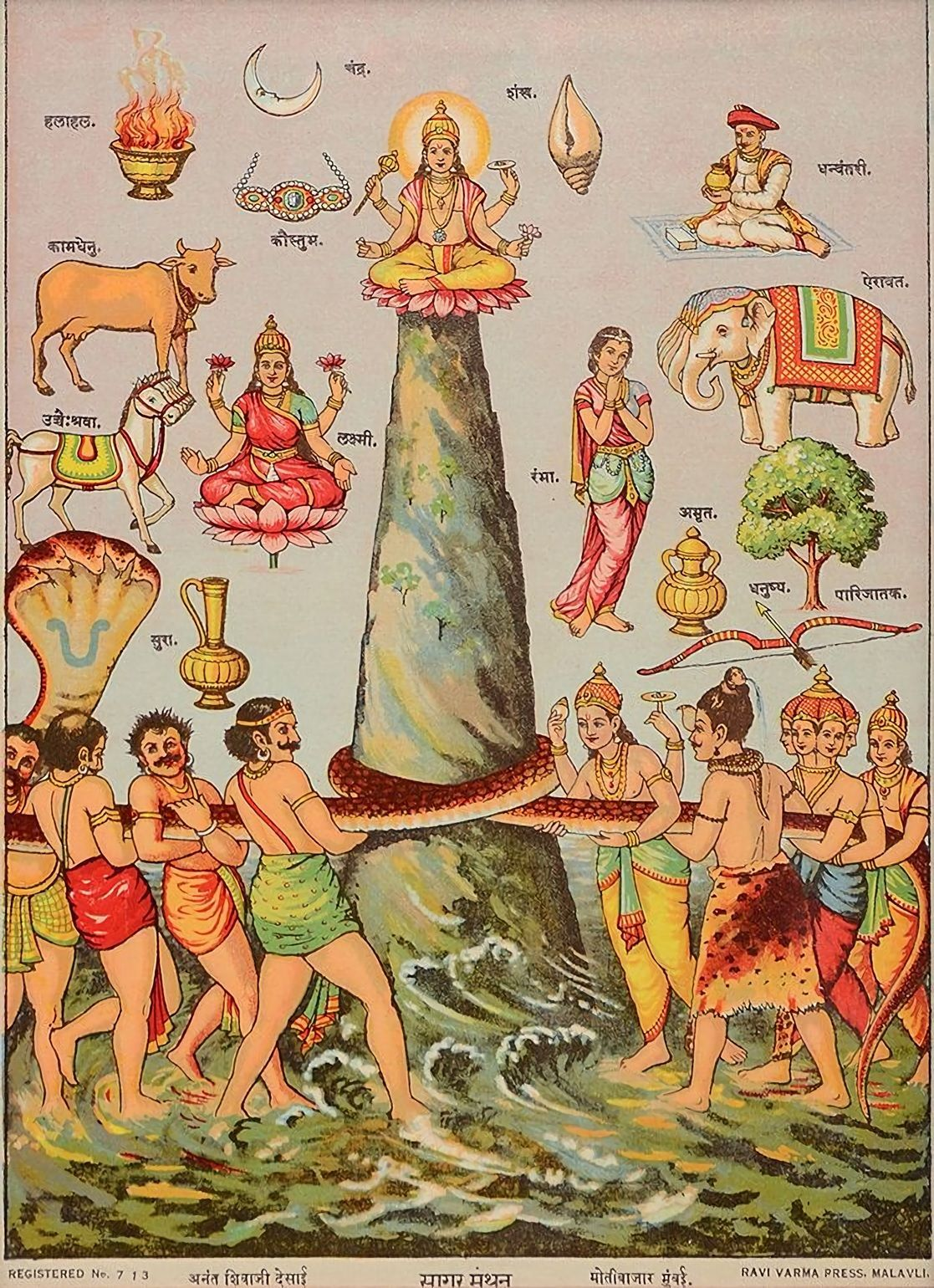
Kaustubha, featured in the top-left under the crescent

Kaustubha (Sanskrit: कौस्तुभ, romanized: Kaustubha, lit. 'crest jewel') is a divine ruby or ratnam (gem) in Hindu mythology. This gem is in the possession of Vishnu, granting him the epithet of Kaustubhadhari. It is believed in Hindu scriptures to be the most magnificent ratnam in all of creation, at the time of the churning of the ocean, and acts as a symbol of divine authority.

== Legend ==
In Hindu mythology, the devas and the asuras performed the churning of the ocean of milk (Samudra Manthana) in order to obtain amrita, the elixir of immortality. During this process, fourteen jewels (ratnas) emerged from the ocean. Among the first few treasures that emerged was the kaustubha, described to be an "excellent gem, the lotus-hued ruby".

The Skanda Purana describes the nature of this gem:

From the ocean that was being churned emerged a highly refulgent, extremely bright, most excellent gem having the brilliance of the Sun. It was called Kaustubha. With its brilliance, it illuminated the three worlds. Keeping the Cintāmaṇi (a miraculous stone) in front, they saw the Kaustubha brightening the worlds. All those Suras gave the Kaustubha to Viṣṇu. Suras and Asuras of enhanced strength lustily roared again and began to churn the ocean keeping Cintāmaṇi in the middle.

— Skanda Purana, Chapter 11, Verses 51 - 53

Krishna is described to be wearing the ruby in the Mahabharata:

Now before them they saw the color of the transcendental body of Lord Krishna, exactly like the hue of a newly arrived cloud in the sky. He appeared before them nicely covered with yellow colored silken garments, with four hands like Vishnu, and carrying the different symbols of the club, the conchshell, the disc and the lotus flower. There were marks of golden lines on His chest, and the nipples of His breast appeared to be like the whorl of a lotus flower. His eyes appeared to be spread like the petals of a lotus flower, and His smiling face exhibited the symbol of eternal peace and prosperity. His glittering earrings were set beautifully, and His helmet was bedecked with valuable jewels. The Lord's necklace of pearls and the bangles and bracelets nicely situated on His body all shone with a transcendental beauty. The Kaustubha jewel hanging on His chest glittered with great luster, and the Lord wore a beautiful flower garland.

— Vyasa, Mahabharata, Sabha Parva, Chapter 5

== See also ==
- Chintamani Gem
- Navaratna
- Shrivatsa
- Syamantaka Gem
