= Harapanahalli taluk =

Human settlement in India

Harapanahalli Taluk is a taluk in Vijayanagara district of the Indian state of Karnataka. The headquarters is the town of Harapanahalli, Harapanahalli. There are thirty seven Grama Panchayat villages in Harapanahalli Taluk.

- Harapanahalli
- Chennahalli
- Eshapura
- Harakanalu
- Hulikatte
- Kunchuru
- Halavagalu
- Alagilavada
- Chirstahalli
- Neelagunda
- Telagi
- Duggavathi
- Tavaragondi
- Ittigudi
- Gundagatti
- Myduru
- Chigateri
- Nandibewoor
- Kanavihalli
- Arasikeri
- Uchangidurga
- Adavihalli
- Bennihalli
- Bendigere
- Kanchikere
- Madalagere
- Niluvanji
- Loleshwara
- Pruthaveshwara
- Gajapura
- Yallapura
- Hyarada
- Togarikatte
- Hombalagatte
- Nichapura
- Kodhihalli
- Kulahalli
- Bagali
- Basapura
- Kallahalli
- Narayanapura
- Bapujinagara
- Byrapura
- Machinahalli
