= Thirunarayanapuram =

Hindu temple in Karnataka, India

Thirunarayanapuram is a Vaishnavite KshEthram, a sacred Vaishnavite shrine. overlooking Kaveri valley in the Southern Indian State of Karnataka.

Melukote Cheluvanarayana Swamy Temple is one of the srivishnava kshetram.

== Nomenclature ==
The temple is more commonly known as Melukote, taking the name from the hill on which it is situated. It is also called Yadugiri by the local people.

== Situation ==
There are many ponds (called koLa in Kannada) even today people of the town uses water from these ponds for washing clothes, taking bath etc., One of the important pond is called Akka Tangi koLa. Water for the temple is taken from this koLa to the temple.

The temple itself is large and breathes history. It is very ancient – Vishnu is said to have worshipped here before his incarnations known as the Dasavataram. Rama too offered prayers here. The main deity Mulavar is Thirunarayanan, Utsavar is called Cheluvanarayana, Sampath Kumaran, Selva Pillai, Ramapriya. The Goddess is Yadugiri Nachiyar or "Goddess of the Hill". Ramanujacharya sannidhi is one of the important one, all the srivaishnava's will visit Ramanuja before taking darshan of Mulava, utsavar and Yadugiri Nacchiyar. Outside the temple are shrines to Vedanta Desika, Manavala Mamuni and other Acharyas. On a hill overlooking the town is a separate Yoganarasimha temple of great antiquity. It is quite a climb on worn steps to reach that temple. Kulasekarar (Cheraman II) gave up his kingdom to his son during 798 AD and started visiting temples and singing praises about them. He is believed to have visited the temple and spent his last days here.

== Festival ==
Only once a year, during the famous Vairamudi Seva, do crowds congregate in Melukote. This festival, when the "utsavar" is adorned with a diamond-encrusted tiara, takes place every year in the month of April. Thirunarayanapuram, with its serene and sacred atmosphere, is a temple one does not want to leave.
