= Vishnu Sahasranama =

Hindu religious hymn

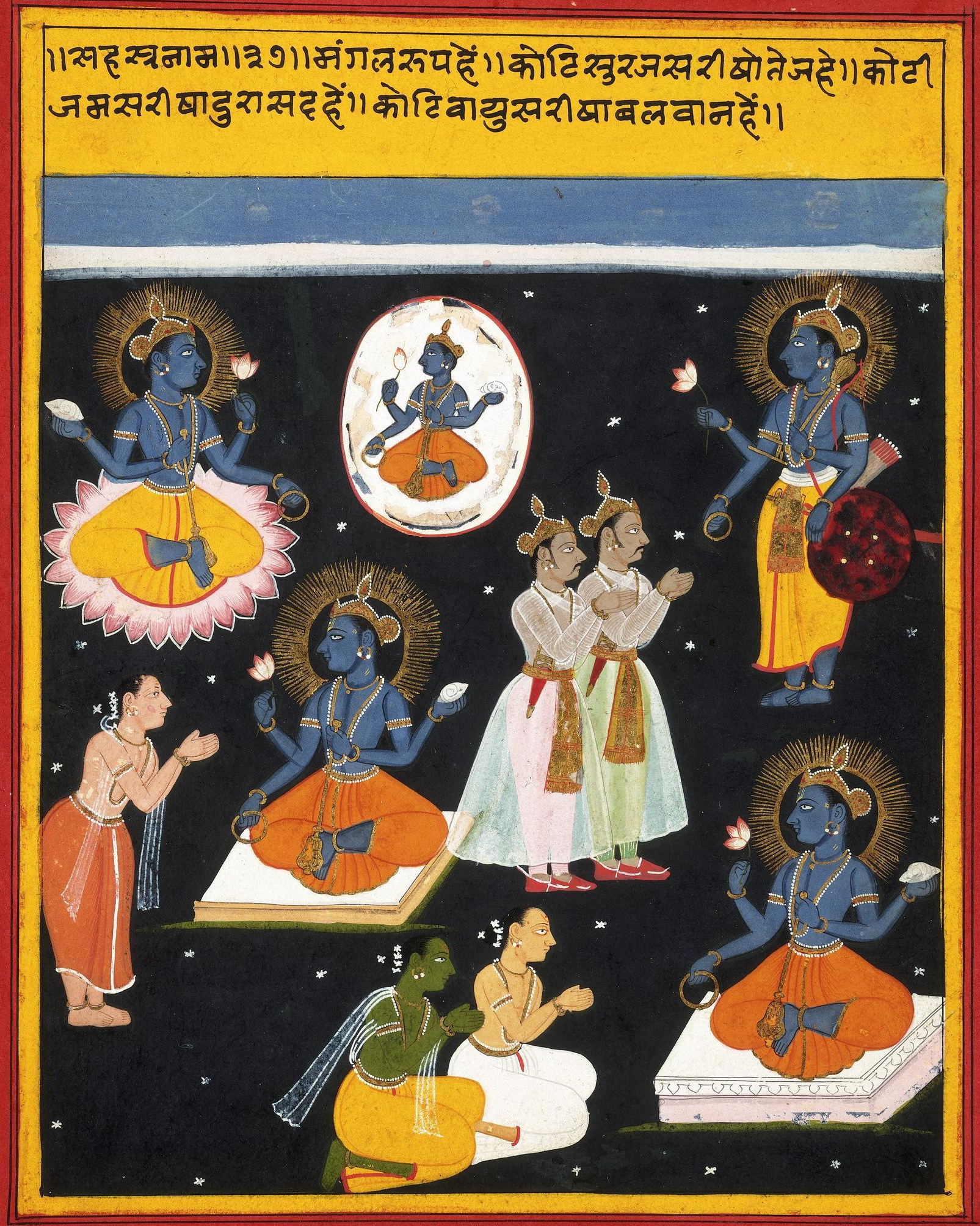
- Vishnusahasranama manuscript, c. 1690

Information
- Religion: Hinduism
- Author: Vyasa
- Verses: 108

The Vishnu Sahasranama (Sanskrit: विष्णुसहस्रनाम, romanized: viṣṇusahasranāma) (Note: A tatpurusha compound) is a Sanskrit hymn containing a list of the 1,000 names of Vishnu, one of the main deities in Hinduism and the Supreme God in Vaishnavism. It is one of the most sacred and popular stotras in Hinduism. The most popular version of the Vishnu Sahasranama is featured in the Anushasana Parva of the epic Mahabharata. Other versions exist in the Padma Purana, the Skanda Purana, and the Garuda Purana. There is also a Sikh version of the Vishnu Sahasranama found in the work Sundar Gutka.

== Etymology ==
The phalashruti (meritorious verse) of the hymn says that one who reads the text every day with full devotion achieves name, fame, wealth, knowledge and pleasure in his life.

== Interpretations ==
The Vishnu Sahasranama is one of the most popular and widely recited stotras among Hindus. Despite the existence of sahasranamas of other deities, reference to "The Sahasranama" generally denotes the Vishnu Sahasranama alone, which reflects its wide popularity and use.

In Adi Shankara's commentary, the 27th name Shiva is explained as:"One who is not affected by the three Gunas of Prakrti: Sattva, Rajas, and Tamas. Shankara cites the Kaivalaya Upanishad verse "He is both Brahma and Shiva", to emphasize "the non-difference between Shiva and Vishnu, it is Vishnu Himself Who Is exalted by the praise and worship of Shiva."

=== Interpretations alluding to the power of God in controlling karma ===
Many names in the Vishnu Sahasranama allude to the power of God in controlling karma. For example, the 135th name, Dharmadhyaksha, is interpreted by Sankara as, "One who directly sees the merits (Dharma) and demerits (Adharma), of beings by bestowing their due rewards on them." Other names of Vishnu alluding to this nature of god are Bhavanah, the 32nd name, Vidhata, the 44th name, Apramattah, the 325th name, Sthanadah, the 387th name and Srivibhavanah, the 609th name. Bhavanah, according to Sankara's interpretation, means "One who generates the fruits of Karmas of all Jivas for them to enjoy." In Brahma Sutra 3.2.28, phalamatah upapatteh speaks of the Lord's function as the bestower of the fruits (phalam) of all actions of the jivas.

== Commentaries ==
The Vishnu Sahasranama has been the subject of numerous commentaries:

- Parasara Bhattar (12th century), a follower of Ramanuja, wrote a commentary in the 12th century detailing the names of Vishnu from a Vishishtadvaita perspective, in the book titled Bhagavath Guna Dharpanam (or Bhagavad Guna Dharpana, meaning reflections of the Lord's qualities).
- Vidyadhiraja Tirtha (died 1392) (disciple of Jayatirtha) of Dvaita Vedanta wrote a commentary on the Vishnu Sahasranama called Viṣṇusahasranāmavivṛti.
- Satyanidhi Tirtha (died 1660) of Dvaita Vedanta wrote the Vishnu Sahasranama Vyakhyana, a commentary on the Vishnu Sahasranama.
- Satyasandha Tirtha (died 1794) of Dvaita Vedanta wrote the Viṣṇusahasranāmabhāṣya, a commentary on the Vishnu Sahasranama.
- Baladeva Vidyabhushana (18th Century) of the Acintya-bhedābheda school of Vedānta wrote the Nāmārtha-sudhā, a commentary on the Viṣṇu-sahasra-nāma.
- Adi Shankara (8th century) wrote a commentary on the Vishnu Sahasranama.

== See also ==
- Hare Krishna
- Sandhyavandhanam
- Brahmin
- Bhadrakalpikasutra
- Vaijayanti

== Sources ==
- Sankaranarayan, P. (1996), Śrī Viṣṇu Sahasranāma Stotram, Mumbai: Bharatiya Vidya Bhavan. With an English Translation of Sri Sankara Bhagavatpada's Commentary
- Sharma, B. N. Krishnamurti (2000). A History of the Dvaita School of Vedānta and Its Literature, Vol 1. 3rd Edition. Motilal Banarsidass (2008 Reprint). ISBN 978-8120815759.
- Tapasyananda, Swami, Sri Vishnu Sahasranama, Chennai: Sri Ramakrishna Math. Sanskrit and English, with an English translation of Sri Sankara Bhagavatpada's commentary.
