= Vaikuntha =

Celestial abode of Vishnu

Painting of Vaikuṇṭha, 19th century

Vaikuntha (Sanskrit: वैकुण्ठ, romanized: Vaikuṇṭha, lit. 'without anxiety / imperfections'), also called Vishnuloka (Viṣṇuloka), is the abode of Vishnu, the supreme deity in the Vaishnava tradition of Hinduism, and his consort, Lakshmi, the supreme goddess of the sect.

According to Ramanuja, Vaikuntha is the Parama Padam or Nitya Vibhuti, an "eternal heavenly realm", and is the "divine imperishable world that is God's abode". In Vaishnava literature, Vaikuntha is described as the highest realm above the fourteen lokas (worlds), and the place where the devotees of Vishnu go upon achieving liberation. It is guarded by the twin deities, Jaya and Vijaya, the dvarapalakas, or gatekeepers of Vaikuntha. The army of Vishnu, stationed at Vaikuntha, is led by Vishvaksena. The planets of Vaikuntha are described as being full of golden palaces and hanging gardens that grow fragrant fruits and flowers.

The planets of Vaikuntha begin 26,200,000 yojanas (209,600,000 miles) above Satyaloka. This does not refer to physical distance. In most of the extant Puranas and Vaishnava traditions, Vaikuntha is located in the direction of the Makara rashi, which corresponds with the constellation of Capricorn. One version of the cosmology states that Vishnu's eye is present at the south celestial pole, from where he watches the cosmos.

== Literature ==
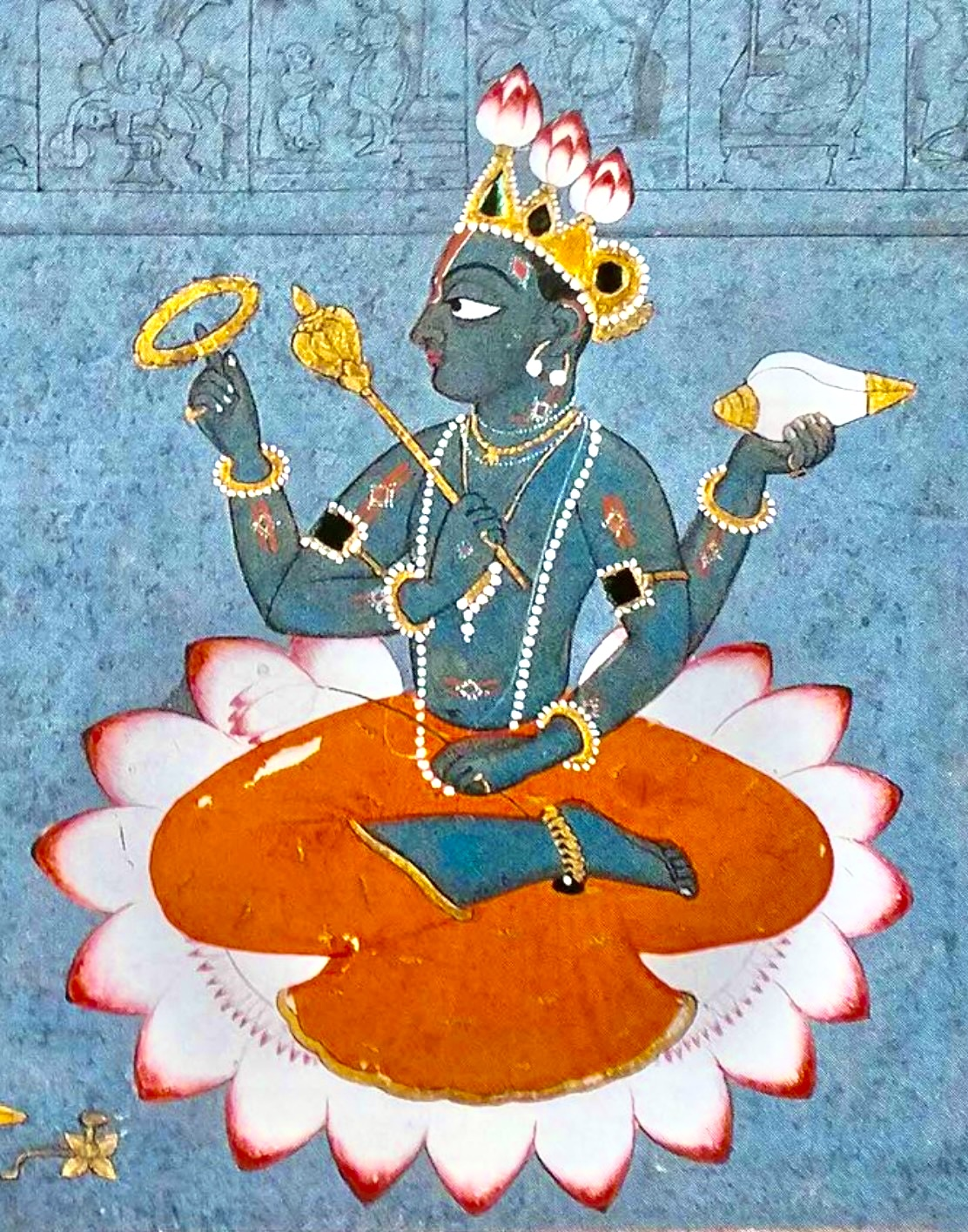
Vishnu, ruler of Vaikuntha

=== Bhagavata Purana ===
Vaikuntha and its characteristics are described in the Bhagavata Purana, a revered text in Vaishnavism, which was composed between the eighth and the tenth century CE, and maybe as early as the 6th century CE. It is described as being free of fear, illusion, and suffering.

American Indologist Edwin Bryant, in his book from 2003, comments about the verses describing Vaikuntha in the text of Bhagavata Purana:

In the Bhagavata, the text speaks of Vaikuntha, adorable to all the worlds (X.12.26), as the highest realm where Vishnu resides (XII.24.14). This, too, is the highest region (IV.12.26); beyond the world of darkness and samsāra (the cycle of birth and death) (IV.24.29; X.88.25); the destination of those who have transcended the three Gunas even while they are still alive (XI.25.22); and beyond which there is no higher place (II.2.18, II.9.9). The peaceful ascetics who reach that place never return (IV.9.29; X.88.25-6). The residents of Vaikuntha do not have material bodies but have pure forms (VII.1.34). These forms are like that of Vishnu (III.15.14ff.), also known as Narayana. Vishnu/Narayana resides in Vaikuntha with Lakshmi, the goddess of fortune, in palaces with crystal walls. The parks there shine like final liberation itself and contain wish-fulfilling trees, which blossom all year-round. There are fragrant winds, and creepers dripping with honey near bodies of water. Cries of exotic birds mingle with the humming of bees, and magnificent flowers bloom everywhere. Devotees of Vishnu along with their beautiful wives travel in aerial vehicles made of jewels, emeralds and gold, but the beautiful smiling residents of this realm cannot distract the minds of the opposite sex, since everyone is absorbed in Krishna (III.15.14-25).

Translation of some verses in Canto 2, by Bibek Debroy:

The illustrious one was pleased through this worship. He showed him his own supreme world and there is nothing superior to this. All the different kinds of affliction do not exist there, nor do confusion and fear. It is a place that is praised by those who have realized their own selves. (BP 2.9.9)

There is no rajas or tamas there and these do not get mixed up with sattva. Time has no power there. There is no maya there, not to speak of other things. There, those who follow Hari are worshipped by gods and asuras. (BP 2.9.10)

Their radiance is dark blue. Their eyes are like lotuses with one hundred petals. Their garments are yellow. They are extremely handsome and their bodies are extremely well formed. All of them possess four arms, decorated with shining jewels. The excellent golden ornaments are extremely radiant. (BP 2.9.11)

They are as radiant as coral, lapis lazuli and lotuses. The earrings seem to bloom and they wear diadems and garlands. (BP 2.9.12)

On every side of that shining world, there are brilliant arrays of vimanas that belong to the great-souled ones. The complexion of the excellent women is like lightning. The place looks like the sky, covered by arrays of clouds tinged with lightning. (BP 2.9.13)

In embodied form, Shri tends to the lord’s feet. In many different kinds of splendour, she honours him. She sings about her beloved’s deeds. In turn, bees, which follow spring, sing words of praise about Shri. (BP 2.9.14)

He saw the lord of all the Satvatas there, Shri’s lord, the lord of sacrifices and the lord of the universe. Sunanda, Nanda, Prabala, Arhana and others were the foremost among his attendants and they served the lord. (BP 2.9.15)

He showed his favours by glancing towards his servants and that glance was intoxicating. His face beamed with a pleasant smile and his eyes were red. He wore a diadem and earrings and possessed four arms. His garments were yellow and the mark of shrivatsa could be discerned on his chest. (BP 2.9.16)

He was worshipped astride a supreme throne and was surrounded by the four, sixteen and five powers. His personal powers are with him and so are minor and temporary powers. The lord found delight in his own abode. (BP 2.9.17)

It is also said that Vaikuntha is the liberated world or the world after moksha.

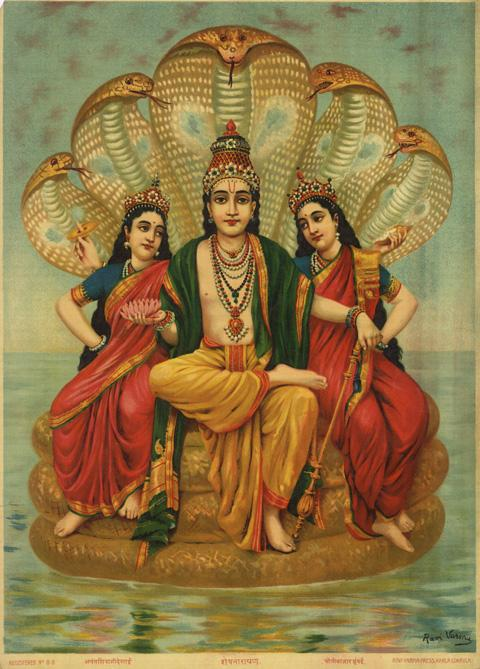
Narayana with Sridevi and Bhudevi, painting by Raja Ravi Varma

=== Narayana Upanishad ===
The Narayana Upanishad mentions the abode:

pratyag ananda brahma purusam pranava svarupam
a kara u karo ma kara iti
ta anekadha sam etad om iti
yam uktva mucyate yogi
janma samsara bandhanat
om namo narayanayeti mantropasakah
vaikuntha bhuvanam gamisyati
tad idam pundarikam vijnanan ghanam
tasmad taridabha matram
brahmanyo devakiputro brahmanyo madhusudanah brahmanyah
pundarikakso brahmanyo visnur acyuta iti
sarva bhuta stham ekam narayanam
karana rupam akaranam param brahma om
The syllable "om" is directly the Supreme Lord full of bliss. Composed of three sounds "a", "u" and "m", the pranava becomes "om". The yogi who utters the pranava many times becomes free from the bondage of repeated material birth. One who worships the Lord with this mantra Om Namo Narayanaya will certainly go to the transcendental realm of vaikuntha, which is a lotus full of consciousness shining effulgently. The transcendental Lord is known as the son of Devaki, as Madhusudana, as Pundarikaksa, as Visnu and Acyuta. The one Narayana is situated in all living entities. He is the cause of all causes, the supreme brahman.

— Narayana Upanishad

=== Brihad Bhagavatamrita ===
The Brihad Bhagavatamrita paints a picture of Vishnu's activities at Vaikuntha:

kadāpi tatropavaneṣu līlayā tathā lasantaṃ niciteṣu go-gaṇaiḥ |
paśyāmy amuṃ karhy api pūrvavat sthitaṃ nijāsane sva-prabhuvac ca sarvathā || 112 || Sometimes the Lord would go to the gardens in Vaikuṇṭha where He would enact pastimes similar to those of Vraja, and I would see the gardens full of cows. Other times I would see Him sitting majestically on His throne as before. At that time, He would appear just like my Lord Gopāla in all respects.

— Brihad Bhagavatamrita, Verse 2.4.112

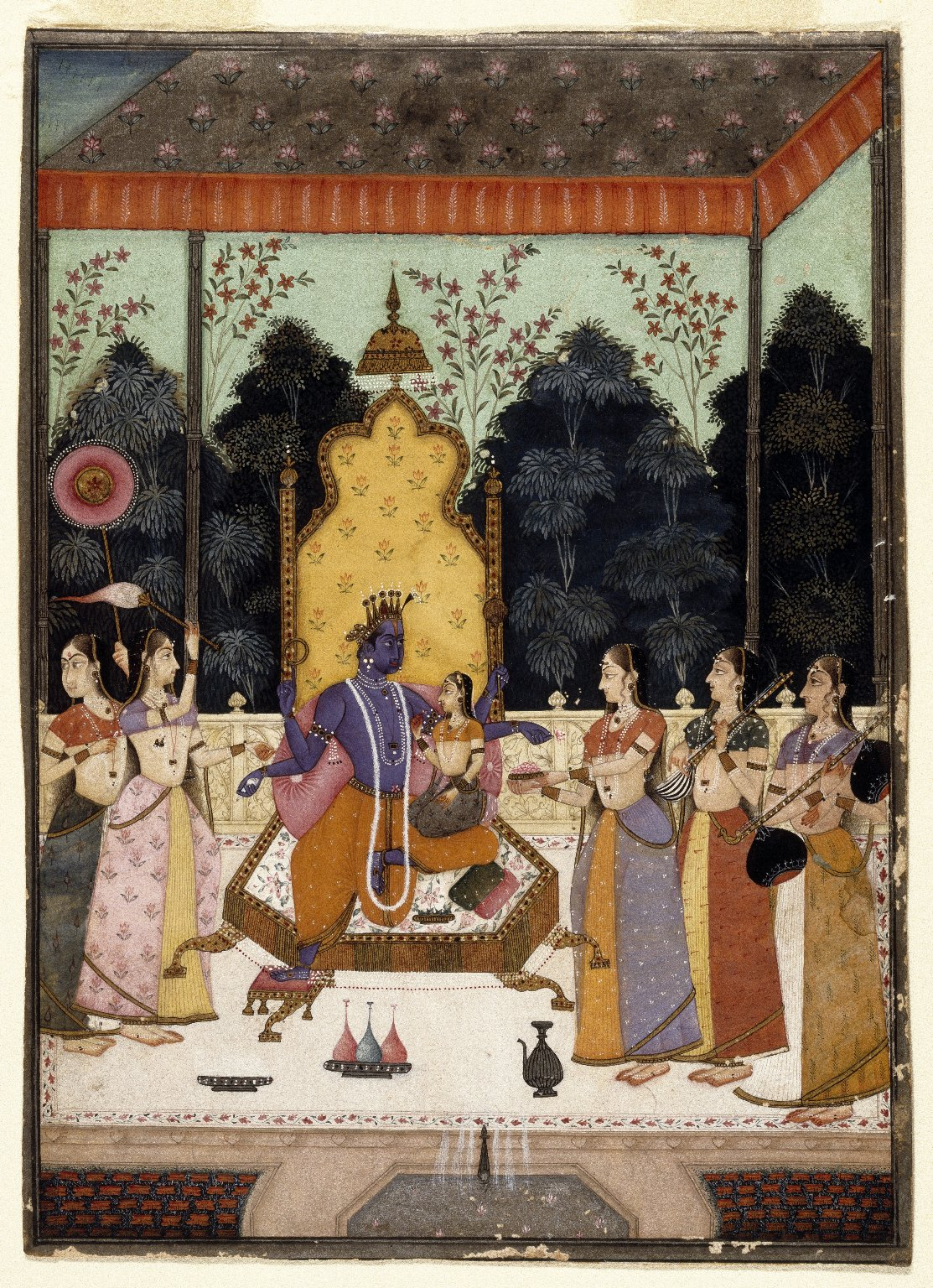
A painting of Vishnu and Lakshmi (Vaikuntha Darshana) - Brooklyn Museum

=== Tiruvaymoli ===
In the work of Nammalvar, Vaikuntha is referred to as Tirunatu (sacred land) in the Tamil literary tradition. In Sri Vaishnava tradition, this abode is listed as the one hundred and eighth, and the last of the Divya Desams, the divine realms of Vishnu on earth and beyond. The verses of the Tiruvaymoli describe this abode as the following:

Even the unthinking clouds, by adorning and filling the sky, applaud the Srivaisnavas proceeding heavenwards. . . (10.9.1)

As some [residents of heaven) gave the fruit of their sacrifices, others worshipfully offered fragrance and lamps; some blew trumpets and conches. . . (10.9.6)

Like a mother overjoyed at the sight of a long absent son, [the Lord’s consorts] are filled with love at seeing [the new arrivals] . . .[and] come with their divine attendants, bringing . . . their greatest treasure, which is Sri Sathakopa, along with fragrant powder, large lamps, and other auspicious articles with which to honor them. (10.9.10)

— Tiruvaymoli

== See also ==
- Kailasha
- Satyaloka
- Kshira Sagara
- Lakshmi Narayana
- Goloka Vrindavana
- Vaikuntha Chaturdashi
