= Varaha =

Boar avatar of the Hindu god Vishnu

- Embodiment of Sacrifice
- Member of Dashavatara
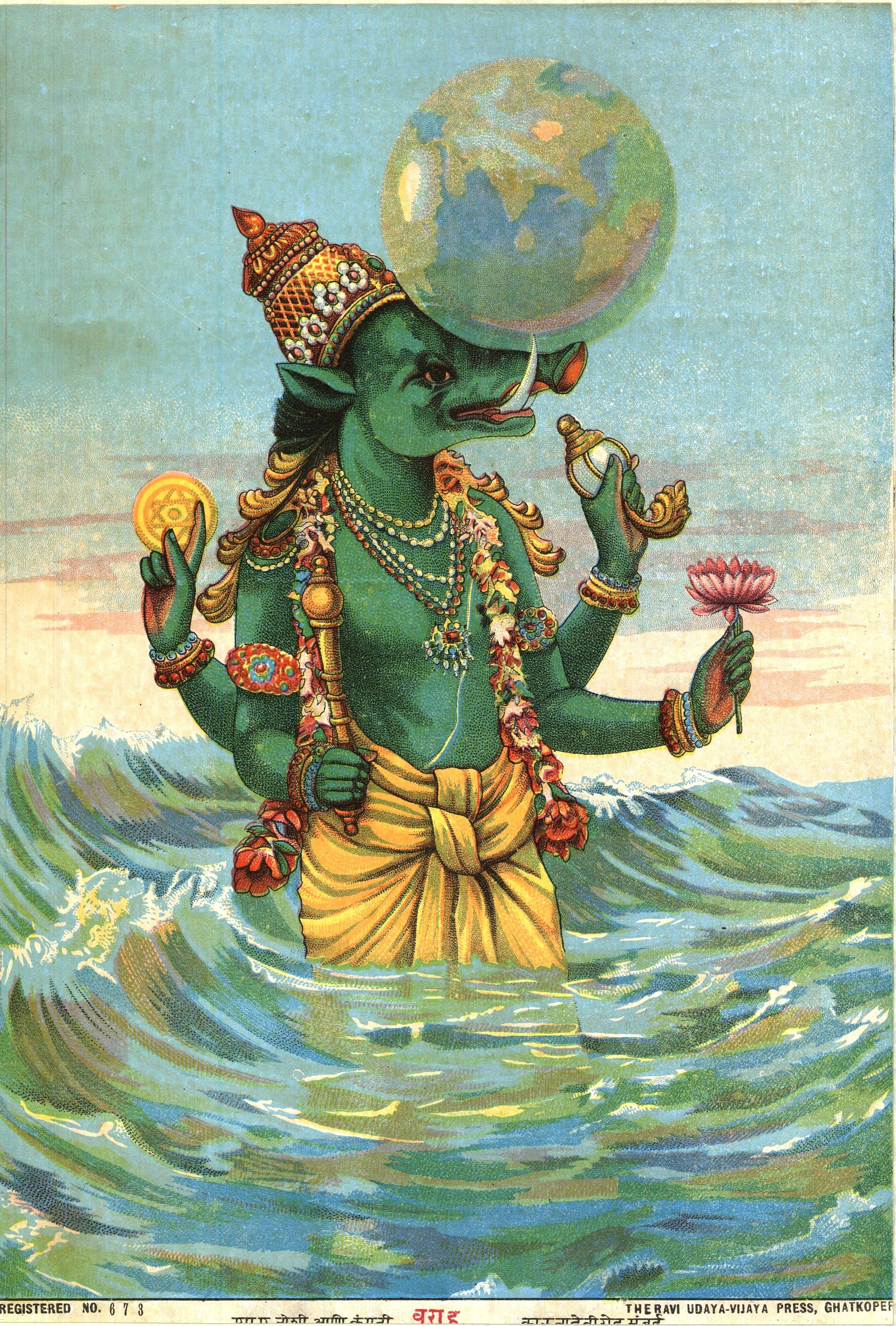
- Painting depicting Varaha by Raja Ravi Varma, circa 1930
- Devanagari: वराह
- Affiliation: Avatara of Vishnu
- Abode: Vaikuntha
- Mantra: Om Bhuvarāhāya Vidmahe; Hiranyakarabhāya Dhimahi; Tanno Krodha Prachodayāt
- Weapon: Sudarshana Chakra, Kaumodaki (Gada)
- Symbols: Padma
- Festivals: Varaha Jayanti

Genealogy
- Consort: Bhumi
- Children: Narakasura, Mangala

Dashavatara Sequence
- Predecessor: Kurma
- Successor: Narasimha

Varaha (Sanskrit: वराह, Varāha, "boar") is an avatar of the Hindu god Vishnu, in the form of a boar. Varaha is generally listed as third in the Dashavatara, the ten principal avatars of Vishnu.

In legend, when the demon Hiranyaksha steals the earth goddess Bhumi and hides her in the primordial waters, Vishnu appears as Varaha to rescue her. Varaha kills Hiranyaksha and retrieves the earth from the cosmic ocean, lifting her on his tusks, and restores her to her place in the universe.

Varaha is depicted as a boar or in an anthropomorphic form, with a boar's head and the human body. Varaha is often depicted lifting his consort Bhumi, the earth.

== Etymology and other names ==
The deity Varaha derives its name from the Sanskrit word varaha (Devanagari: वराह, varāha) meaning "boar" or "wild boar".

The word varāha is from Proto-Indo-Iranian term warāȷ́ʰá, meaning boar. It is thus related to Avestan varāza, Kurdish beraz, Middle Persian warāz, and New Persian gorāz (گراز), all meaning "wild boar".

The Sanskrit grammarian and etymologist Yaska (circa 300 BCE) states that the word varaha originates from the root √hr. The Monier-Williams dictionary states that the root √hr means "'to offer', 'to outdo, eclipse, surpass', 'to enrapture, charm, fascinate', and 'to take away or remove evil or sin'" and also "to take away, carry off, seize, deprive of, steal, rob".

As per Yaska, the boar is an animal that "tears up the roots, or it tears up all the good roots" is thus called varaha. The word varaha is found in the Rigveda, for example, in its verses such as 1.88.5, 8.77.10 and 10.28.4 where it means "wild boar".

The word also means "rain cloud" and is symbolic in some Rigvedic hymns, such as Vedic deity Vritra being called a varaha in Rigvedic verses 1.61.7 and 10.99.6, and Soma's epithet being a varaha in 10.97.7. Later the rain-relationship led the connotation of the term evolve into vara-aharta, which means "bringer of good things" (rain), which also mentioned by Yaska.

Yaska mentions a third meaning of the word varaha. The Vedic group of Angirases are called varahas or collectively a varahavah.

The god Varaha is also called referred by the epithet sukara (Sanskrit सूकर, sūkara), meaning 'wild boar', which also used in the Rigveda (e.g. 7.55.4) and the Atharvaveda (e.g. 2.27.2). The word literally means "the animal that makes a peculiar nasal sound in respiration"; in the Bhagavata Purana, Varaha is referred to Sukara, when he is born from the god Brahma's nostrils.

== Legends and scriptural references ==
=== Vedic origins ===
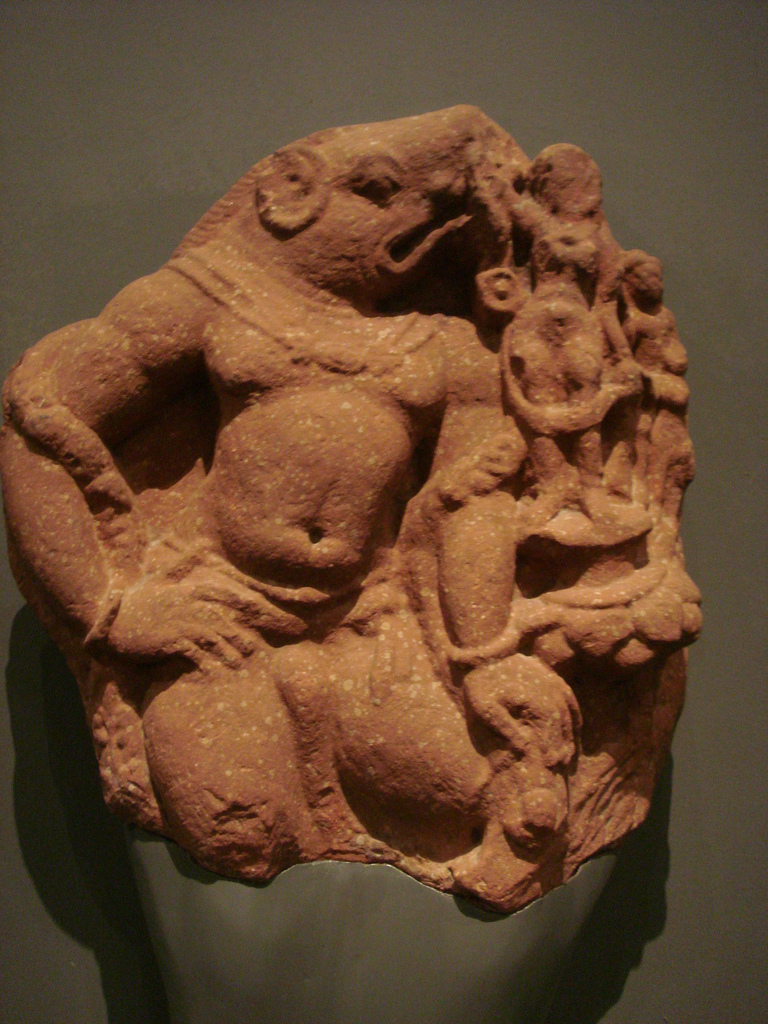
A 3rd-century-CE sandstone statue of Varaha holding his consort Bhumi, Art of Mathura, housed in LACMA.

The origin of Varaha is found in the Vedas, the oldest Hindu scriptures. Varaha is originally described as a form of Prajapati (who is equated to the god Brahma), but on evolved into the avatar of Vishnu in later Hindu scriptures. Two other avatars of Vishnu - Matsya (the fish) and Kurma (the tortoise) were also equated with Prajapati, before being shown as forms of Vishnu in later traditions.

Arthur Anthony Macdonell traces the origins of the Varaha legend to two verses (1.61.7 and 8.66.10) of the Rigveda, the oldest Veda. Vishnu, aided by the god Indra, steals hundred buffaloes from a boar (identified Vritra by Macdonell based on verse 1.121.11); and then Indra - shooting across a mountain slays the emusha ("fierce") beast. Arthur Berriedale Keith also agrees with Macdonell; interpreting the mountain as a cloud and the slaying a retelling of the killing of the asura Vritra by Indra. The 14th-century-CE Vedic commentator Sayana states the Taittiriya Samhita (6.2.4) elaborates the Rigveda version. However, the Rigveda does not hint at the classical legend of the rescue of the earth by the boar. In the scripture, the god Rudra is called the "boar of the sky". Even Vishnu has killed a boar. The hunting and butchering of a boar using dogs is also referred to.

The Taittiriya Samhita (6.2.4) mentions that the boar, "the plunderer of wealth", hides the riches of the asuras, beyond the seven hills. Indra kills the boar by striking it a blade of sacred kusha grass, piercing the mounts. Vishnu, "the sacrifice" (yajna), brings the killed boar as a sacrificial offering to the gods, thereby the gods acquiring the treasure of the asuras. Vishnu is both the sacrifice as well as the "bringer of sacrifice"; the boar being the sacrifice. The tale is also recalled in Charaka Brahmana and Kathaka Brahmana; the latter calls the boar Emusha.

According to J. L. Brockington, there are two distinct boar mythologies in Vedic literature. In one, he is depicted as a form of Prajapati, in other an asura named Emusha is a boar that fights Indra and Vishnu. The section 14.1.2 of the Shatapatha Brahmana harmonizes the two myths and Emusha is conflated into Prajapati.

The earliest versions of the classical Varaha legend are found in the Taittiriya Samhita and the Shatapatha Brahmana; scholars differ on which one is the core version. The Shatapatha Brahmana narrates that the universe was primordial waters. The earth which was the size of a hand, was trapped in it. Prajapati in the form of a boar (varaha) plunges into the waters and brings the earth out. He also marries the earth thereafter. The Shatapatha Brahmana calls the boar as Emusha, which Keith relates to the boar's epithet emusha in the Rigveda. In the Taittiriya Samhita (7.1.5), Prajapati - who was roaming as the wind - acquires the form of a "cosmogonic" boar lifting the earth goddess from the primeval waters. As Vishvakarma (the creator of the world), he flattened her, thus she - the earth - was called Prithvi, "the extended one". They produce various deities.

The Taittiriya Aranyaka (10.1.8) states the earth is lifted by a "black boar with hundred arms". The Taittiriya Brahmana (1.1.3.6) expands the Taittiriya Samhita narrative. The "Lord of creation" was pondering on how the universe should be. He saw a lotus leaf and took the form of a boar to explore under it. He found mud and outstretched it on the leaf, rising above the waters. It was called the earth - Bhumi, literally "that which became (spread)".

=== Creation legend ===
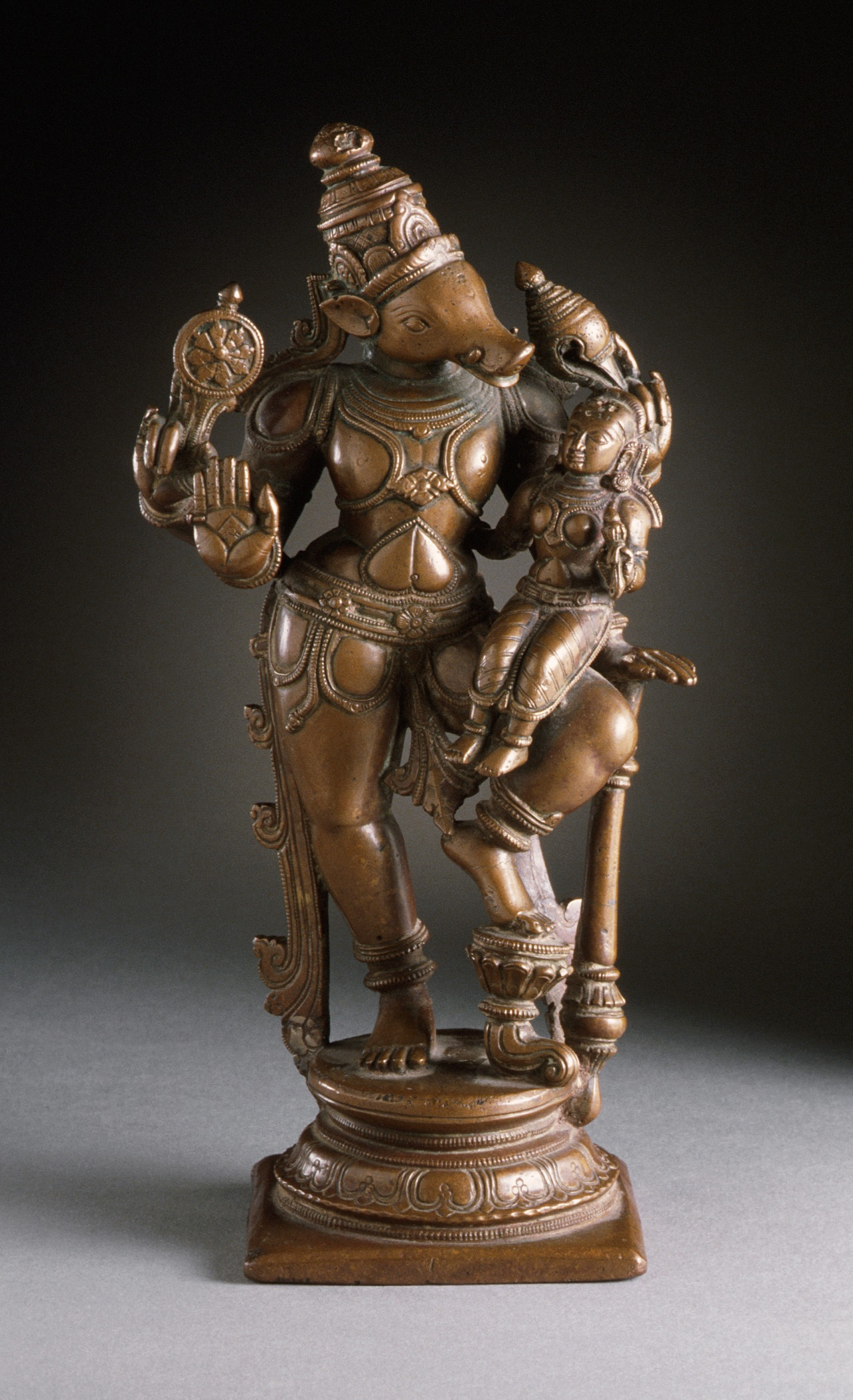
Varaha with his consort Bhumi, a copper statue from Tamil Nadu, 1600 CE.

The Ayodhya Kanda book of the Ramayana refers to Varaha retaining his connection to Prajapati as Brahma. In a cosmogonic myth, Brahma appears in the primal universe full of water and takes the form of a boar to lift the earth from the waters; creation begins with Brahma and his progeny. The Yuddha Kanda book of the Ramayana praises Rama (identified with Vishnu) as "the single-tusked boar", an allusion linking Varaha with Vishnu. In the Mahabharata, Narayana ("one who lies in the waters", an appellation of Brahma which was later transferred to Vishnu) is praised as the one who rescues the earth as a boar.

The Puranas complete the full transition of Varaha from Prajapati-Brahma to the avatar of Narayana-Vishnu. The Brahmanda Purana, the Vayu Purana, the Vishnu Purana, the Linga Purana, the Markendeya Purana, the Kurma Purana, the Garuda Purana, the Padma Purana and the Shiva Purana have similar narratives of the cosmogonic myth, wherein Brahma, identified with Vishnu, takes the Varaha form to raise the earth from the primeval waters.

The Brahmanda Purana, one of the oldest Puranas, narrates that in the present kalpa ("aeon") called Varaha kalpa, Brahma wakes from his slumber. Brahma is called Narayana ("he who lies in the waters"). The Vayu Purana says that Brahma roams as the wind in the waters, alluding to the Vedic Taittiriya Brahmana version. The detailed Brahmanda Purana version says that Brahma is "invisible" and a shorter summary says that he becomes the wind. In the Brahmanda Purana, realizing that the earth was in the waters, Brahma takes the form of Varaha, as the boar likes to sport in the water. Similar reasons for taking the boar form particularly are also given in the Linga Purana, the Matsya Purana and the Vayu Purana. The Vishnu Purana and the Markendeya Purana add that Brahma-Narayana takes the Varaha form, like the fish (Matsya) and tortoise (Kurma) in previous kalpas.

The Brahma Purana, Venkatacala Mahatmya (in the Skanda Purana), and Vishnu Smriti narrate the tale with slight variation, but without Brahma; Vishnu alone becomes Varaha to lift the sunken earth from the waters. In late addition in the Mahabharata, the single-tusked (Eka-shringa) Varaha (identified with Vishnu) lifts the earth, which sinks under the burden of overpopulation when Vishnu assumes the duties of Yama (the god of Death) and death seizes on earth. In the Matsya Purana and the Harivamsa, at the beginning of a kalpa, Vishnu creates the worlds from the cosmic golden egg. The earth, unable to bear the weight of the new mountains and losing her energy, sinks in the waters to the subterranean realm of Rasatala - the abode of the demons. Varaha (identified with Vishnu, the Lord of sacrifice) emerges as a tiny beast (a size of a thumb) from the nostrils of Brahma, grows to elephant-sized and then to mountain-sized and raises the earth to the intrastellar space where Brahma places the created beings.

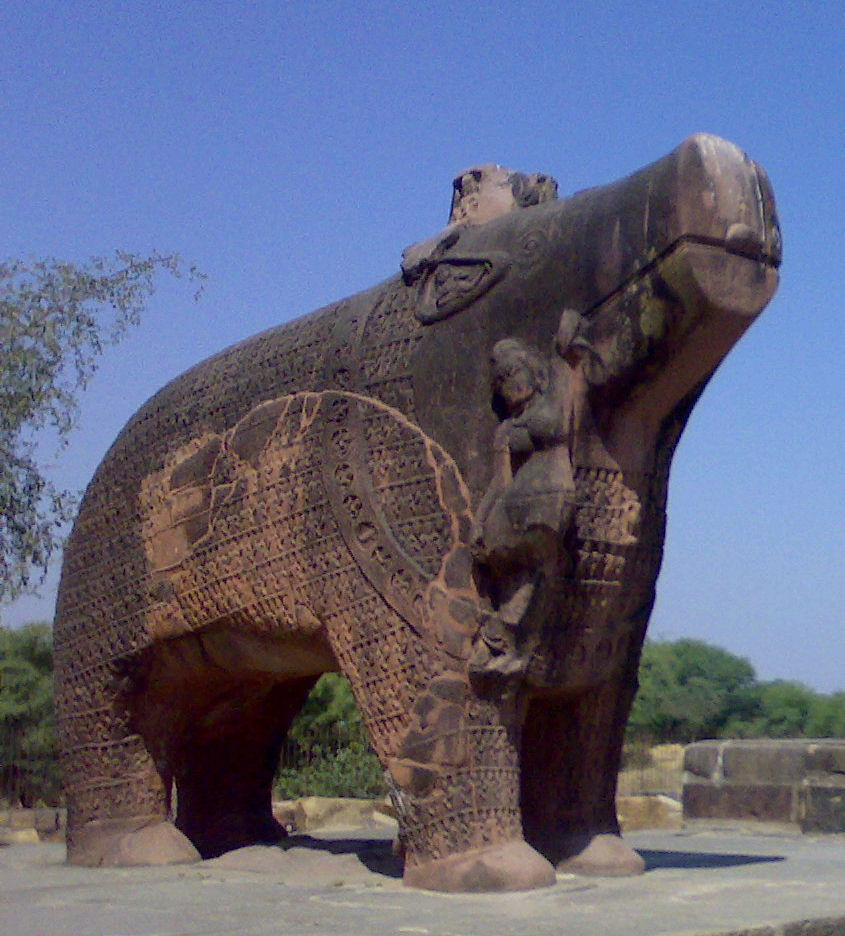
Colossal theriomorphic Varaha at Eran.Dedicated by the Huna king Toramana, circa 510 CE.

The scriptures emphasize Varaha's gigantic size. The Brahmanda Purana, Vayu Purana, Matsya Purana, Harivamsa, and Linga Purana describes Varaha as 10 yojanas wide and a 1000 yojanas high. He is large as a mountain and blazing like the sun. Dark like a rain cloud in complexion, his tusks are white, sharp and fearsome. His body is the size of the space between the earth and the sky. His thunderous roar is frightening. In one instance, his mane is so fiery and fearsome that Varuna, the god of the waters, requests Varaha to save him from it. Varaha complies and folds his mane.

Early texts like the Brahmanda Purana and the Vayu Purana build up on the Taittiriya Brahmana Vedic cosmogonic concept of Yajna-varaha (Varaha as sacrifice). The Brahmanda Purana describes the boar form as composed of Vedic sacrifices and his body parts are compared with various implements or participants of a yajna (sacrifice). This description of Yajna-varaha was adopted in other Puranas (Brahma Purana, Bhagavata Purana, Matsya Purana, Padma Purana, Venkatacala Mahatmya of the Skanda Purana, Vishnudharmottara Purana), Harivamsa, Smriti texts (including Vishnu Smriti,), Tantras and Adi Shankara's commentary on the Vishnu Sahasranama explaining the epithet Yajnanga ("whose body is yajna"). The Vishnu Purana, the Bhagavata Purana and the Padma Purana embeds the sacrificial description within a paean to Varaha by the sages of Janaloka after Varah saves the earth. Roshen Dalal describes the symbolism of his iconography based on the Vishnu Purana as follows:

His four feet represent the Vedas (scriptures). His tusks represent sacrificial stakes. His teeth are offerings. His mouth is the altar, the tongue is the sacrificial fire. The hair on his head denotes the sacrificial grass. The eyes represent the day and night. The head represents the seat of all. The mane represents the hymns of the Vedas. His nostrils are the oblation. His joints represent the various ceremonies. The ears are said to indicate rites (voluntary and obligatory).

Some texts like the Vishnu Purana, the Matsya Purana, the Harivamsa and the Padma Purana contain a panegyric - dedicated to Varaha - and the earth's plea for rescue, clearly identifying Varaha with Vishnu. In Brahmanda Purana and other texts, Varaha carries the earth on his tusks and restores her on the waters, flattening and dividing the earth into seven portions by creating mountains. Further, Brahma, identified with Vishnu, creates natural features like mountains, rivers, oceans, various worlds as well as various beings. The Venkatacala Mahatmya and the first account in the Bhagavata Purana mentions only the rescue of the earth by Varaha, omitting the creation activities attributed to him in other texts. The Venkatacala Mahatmya states that Varaha placed beneath the earth the world elephants, serpent Shesha, and the world turtle as support. The Bhagavata Purana alludes to the slaying of a demon - identified with Hiranyaksha in other narratives in the Purana.

The Linga Purana and the Markendeya Purana also identify Varaha as the rescuer of the earth, with Vishnu, barring the cosmogonic myth.

=== Slayer of demons ===
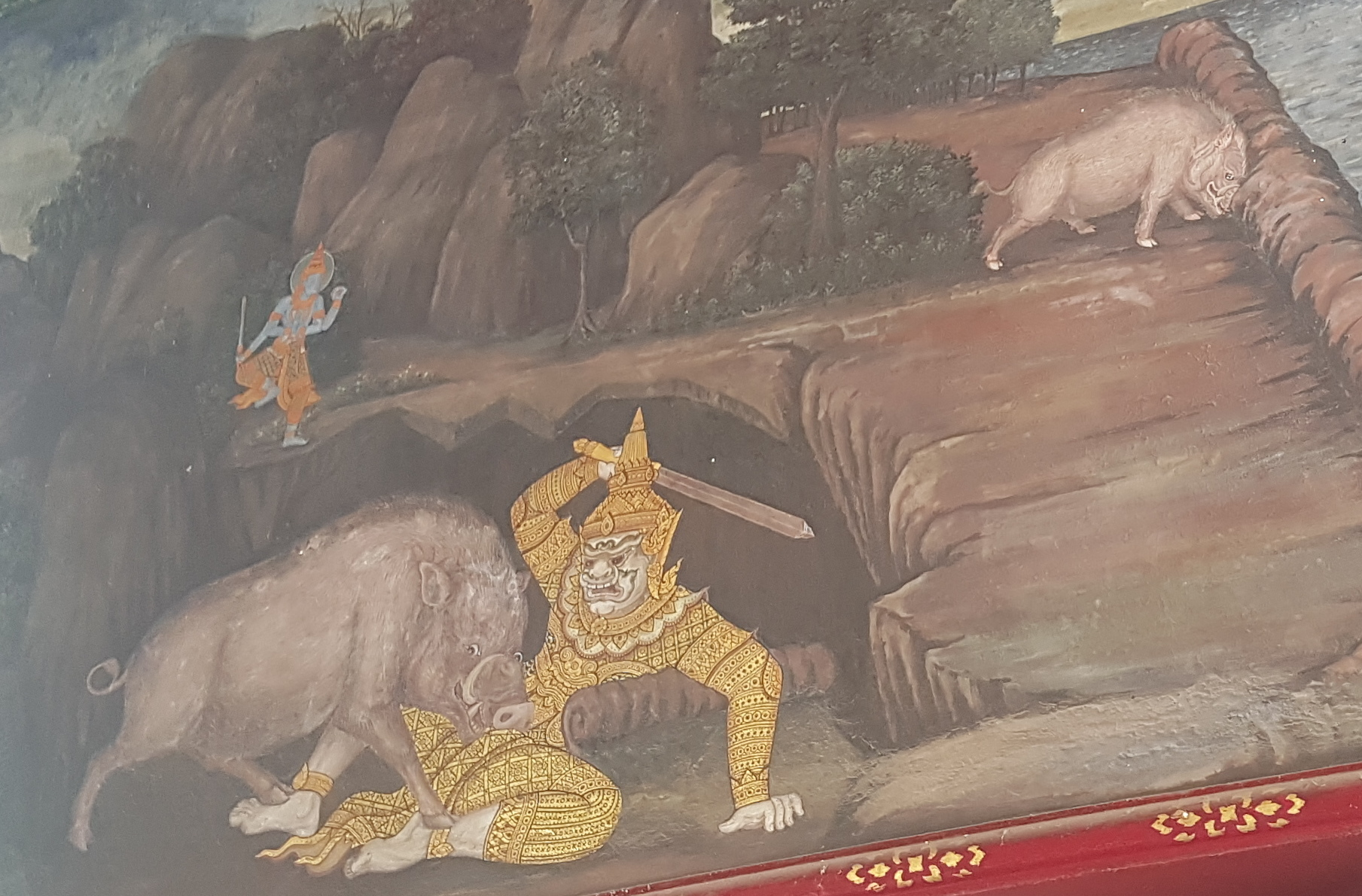
Scene from the Thai version of the Ramayana - the Ramakien - Vishnu (Witsanu) transforms into a boar to kill the demon Hiranyaksha (Hiranta) who curls the earth up in an attempt to take over the world.

Early references in the Mahabharata to the demon Hiranyaksha do not relate him to Varaha. Vishnu is later said to have taken the boar form to slay a demon Naraka. Another late insertion describes Vishnu lifting the earth as well as defeating the Danavas (demons). Late passages start the association of Hiranyaksha with Varaha. Vishnu is praised as Varaha, the vanquisher of Hiranyaksha in three instances.

The Agni Purana mentions the obliteration of the demon Hiranyaksha as Varaha's main purpose. The Linga Purana and the Kurma Purana narrate that the daitya (demon; lit. "son of Diti") Hiranyaksa defeats the gods and entraps the earth in the subterranean realm. Taking the Varaha form, Vishnu slays the demon by piercing him by his tusks. Later, he uplifts the earth from the netherworld and restores her to her original position. The Linga Purana continues further: Later, Vishnu discards his boar body and returns to his heavenly abode of Vaikuntha; the earth cannot bear the weight of his tusks. Shiva relieves the earth by using the same as an ornament.

The Brahmanda Purana, the Vayu Purana, the Matsya Purana and the Padma Purana mentions that Varaha's battle with the asuras (demons) is one of twelve in this kalpa between the gods and the demons. The Brahmanda Purana states that Hiranyaksha is pierced by Varaha's tusk, while Vayu Purana comments that Hiranyaksha is killed in this battle before Varaha rescued the earth. The Harivamsa narrates that the demons led by Hiranyaksha overpower and imprison the gods, Vishnu assumes the boar form and slays the demon-king with his Sudarshana chakra (discus) after a fierce war.

The Shrishti Khanda book of the Padma Purana provides an elaborate description of the war between the gods and the demons led by Hiranyaksha. The demon army is routed by the gods, who in turn by overpowered by the demon-king. Vishnu combats with Hiranyaksha for a hundred divine years; finally the demon expands his size and seizing the earth escapes to the netherworld. Vishnu follows him, taking up the Varaha form and rescues the earth. After engaging in a fierce mace-battle, Varaha finally beheads the demon with his discus.

In the Shiva Purana, the annihilation of Hiranyaksha appears as a cursory tale in the story of subduing of his adopted son Andhaka by Shiva. The demon king Hiranyaksha confines the earth to Patala. Vishnu becomes Varaha (identified with Sacrifice) and slaughters the demon army by trashing them by his snout, piercing by tusks and kicking by his legs. Finally, Varaha decapitates the demon king with his discus and crowns Andhaka as his successor. He picks the earth on his tusks and places it in her original place.

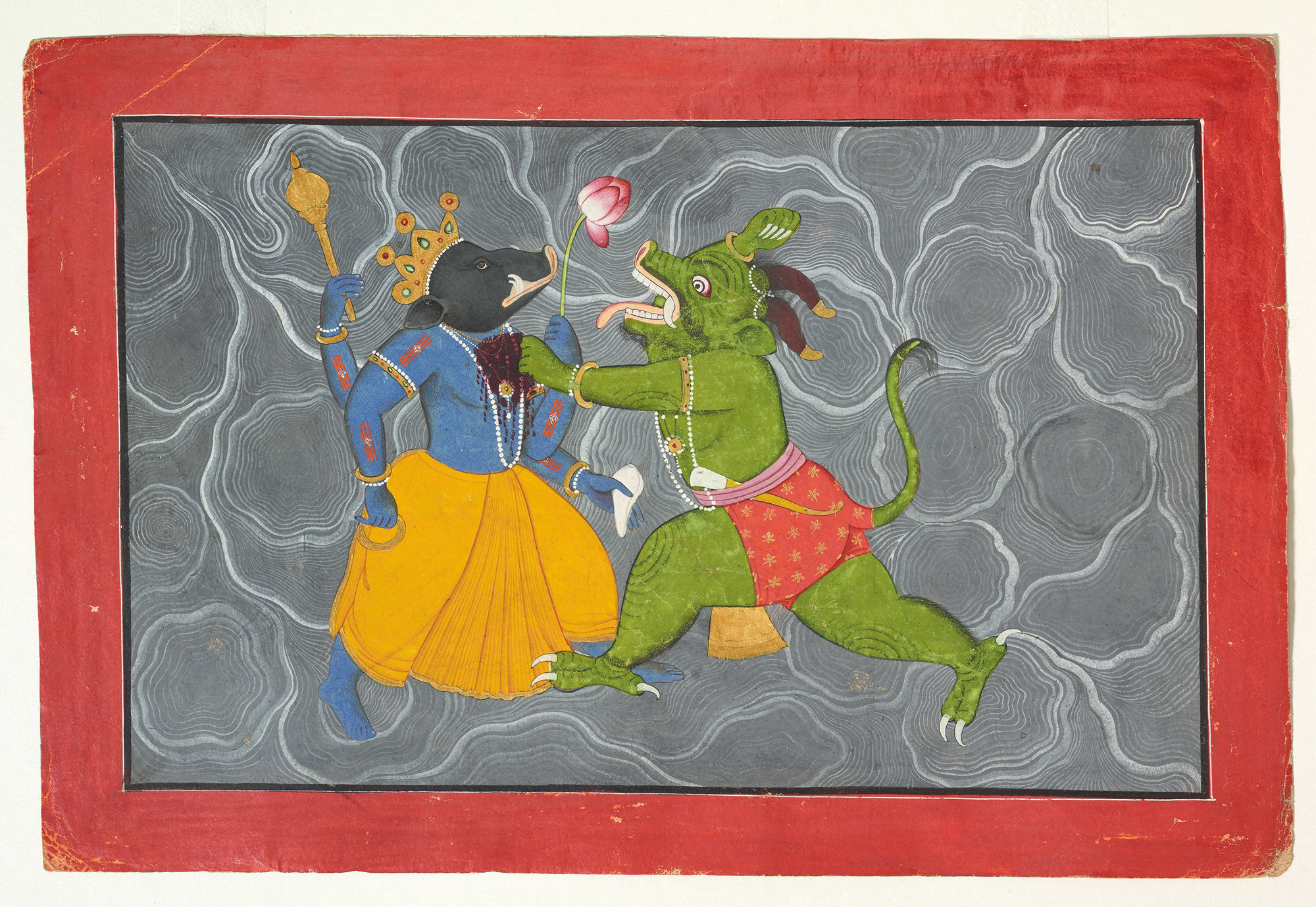
Varaha battles the demon Hiranyaksha, Scene from the ''Bhagavata Purana'' by Manaku of Guler (c. 1740)

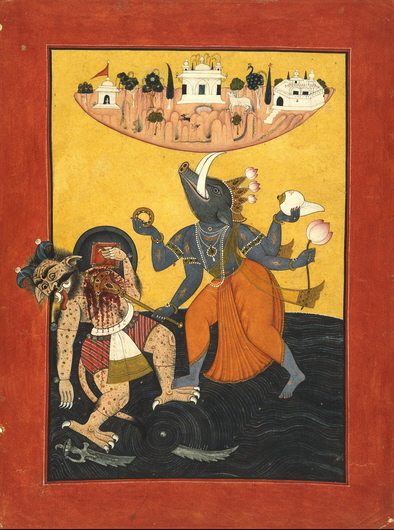
Varaha killing Hiranyaksha and saving Bhumi, 1740 CE, Chamba painting

A detailed second account in the Bhagavata Purana narrates that Jaya and Vijaya, the doorkeepers of Vishnu's abode Vaikuntha, were cursed by the four Kumaras to be born as demons. In their first birth, they are born as the daityas Hiranyakashipu (who is slain by another of Vishnu's avatara of Narasimha) and Hiranyaksha as the twin sons of Diti and the sage Kashyapa. Blessed by Brahma, the king of daityas Hiranyaksha became powerful and conquered the universe. He challenges the sea god Varuna to combat, who redirects him the more powerful Vishnu. The demon confronts Vishnu as Varaha, who is rescuing the earth at the time. The demon mocks Varaha as the animal and warns him not to touch earth. Ignoring the demon's threats, Varaha lifts the earth on his tusks. Varaha engages in a mace-duel with the demon. Varaha destroys with the discus, the demon horde created by the demon's magic; finally slaying Hiranyaksha hitting him with his foreleg after the thousand-year battle.

The Garuda Purana, that refers to the Bhagavata Purana, alludes to the curse in the Hiranyaksha tale. The cursed Vijaya is born as the demon Hiranyaksha, begins a boon from Brahma. He takes the earth to Patala. Vishnu, as Varaha, enters Patala via the ocean. He lifts the earth with the tusks and annihilates the demon; then places the four world elephants to support the earth and settles in Srimushnam. The Uttarakhanda book of the Padma Purana also narrates about the curse of the Kumaras. Jaya and Vijaya choose three births on the earth as foes of Vishnu, rather than seven existences as his devotees to lessen the period of the curse. Hiranyaksha carries the earth away to the underworld. Varaha pierces the demon fatally by his tusk and then places the earth over the hood of the serpent and becomes the world turtle to support it. The Avantikshetra Mahatmya section of the Avantya Khanda Book of the Skanda Purana also refers to the curse. The earth sinks in the waters tormented by the daityas; Varaha vanquishes Hiranyaksha.

In a passing reference in the Brahmanda Purana, the Vayu Purana and Matsya Purana, Varaha is said to have slain Hiranyaksha on Mount Sumana (also called Ambikeya or Rishabha) on/ near the legendary island Jambudvipa. Besides to alluding to the raising of the earth from the waters by Varaha, the Brahmavaivarta Purana also mentions that Hiranyaksha was slain by Varaha. The Garuda Purana and the Narada Purana also refers to Varaha as the slayer of Hiranyaksha.

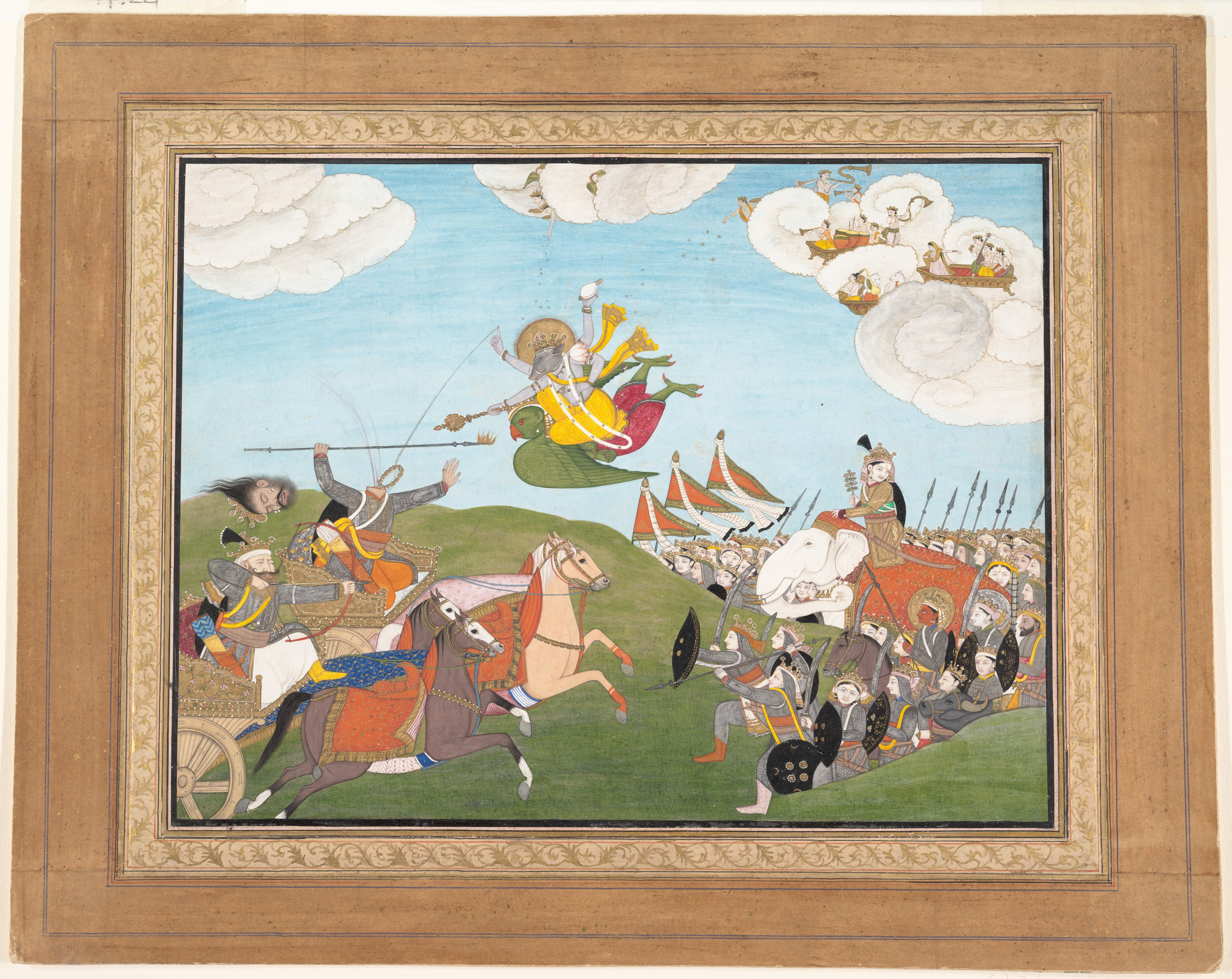
Vishnu as Varaha slaying Banasur

The Brahma Purana narrates another tale where a rakshasa (demon) named Sindhusena defeated the gods and took the sacrifice to the netherworld Rasatala. Implored by the gods, Vishnu takes the form of Varaha and enters Rasatala. He slew the demons and recovered the sacrifice holding it in his mouth (mukha), thus sacrifice known as makha. Near Brahmagiri hill in Trimbak, Varaha washed his blood-stained hands in the river Ganga (identified with the Godavari alias Gautami river); the water collected forms the sacred pond called Varaha-tirtha or Varaha-kunda.

=== Saviour of the ancestors ===
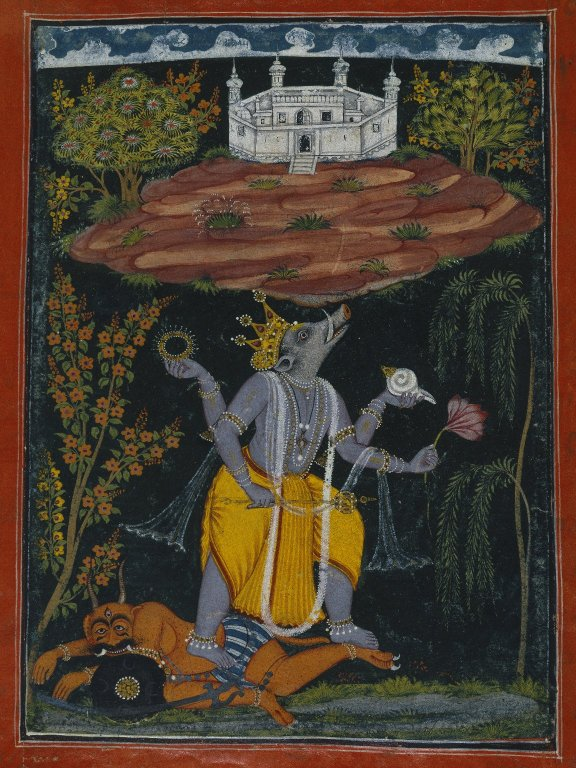
Varaha rescuing the earth, c. 1720-50

In an instance in the Mahabharata after raising the earth, Vishnu as Varaha, shakes his tusk and three balls of mud fall in the South, which he declares as the three pindas (riceballs) to be given to the Pitrs (ancestors). Varaha's association with the three pindas is reiterated in later texts like the epic's appendix Harivamsa, the Vishnudharmottara Purana and the Brahma Purana. This tale constitutes the mythology of Pitr-yajna or Shraddha, sacrifice to the ancestors.

The Brahma Purana narrates about Varaha's deliverance of the Pitrs (manes). Once, the Pitrs lust for Urja (also known as Svadha and Koka), the daughter of the moon-god Chandra. Cursed by Chandra, the Pitrs fall as humans on the Himalayan mountains from their elevated positions, while Koka transforms into a river in the mountains. The demons attack the Pitrs, who hides under a slab in the Koka river. Eulogized by the Pitrs, Varaha uplifted the drowning Pitrs from the river by his tusks. Then, he performs the rites of Shraddha by performing libations and pindas to the Pitrs with the Earth acting as Chaya - his consort in the rituals. Varaha liberated the Pitrs from the curse and blessed Koka to be reborn as Svadha (the food or oblations offered to Pitrs) and become the wife of the Pitrs. Further, Narakasura (also called Bhauma) was born to the earth due to her contact with Varaha. Also, Varaha's temple was established at Kokamukha, where Varaha freed the Pitrs.

=== Children ===
The Vishnu Purana, the Brahma Purana and the Bhagavata Purana, in the episode of the killing of the demon Narakasura by Krishna avatar of Vishnu, mentions that he was the foster son of Varaha and the earth goddess Bhumi. In some versions of the tale, Vishnu-Varaha promises the earth that he will not kill their son, without any consent. In Krishna form, Vishnu slays the demon with the support of Satyabhama, Krishna's consort and the avatar of Bhumi.

The Brahmavaivarta Purana narrates that Varaha slew Hiranyaksha and rescued the earth from the waters. Varaha and the earth goddess were attracted to each other and had sex. After they regained consciousness, Varaha worshipped the earth and decreed that the earth be worshipped at specific occasions, such as the construction of a house, lakes, wells, dams, etc. From their union, Mangala, the god of the planet Mars, was born.

The Avantikshetra Mahatmya of the Skanda Purana states that after slaying Hiranyaksha, the Shipra River springs from the heart of Varaha. Thus, the sacred river is described as the daughter of Varaha.

=== In avatar listings ===
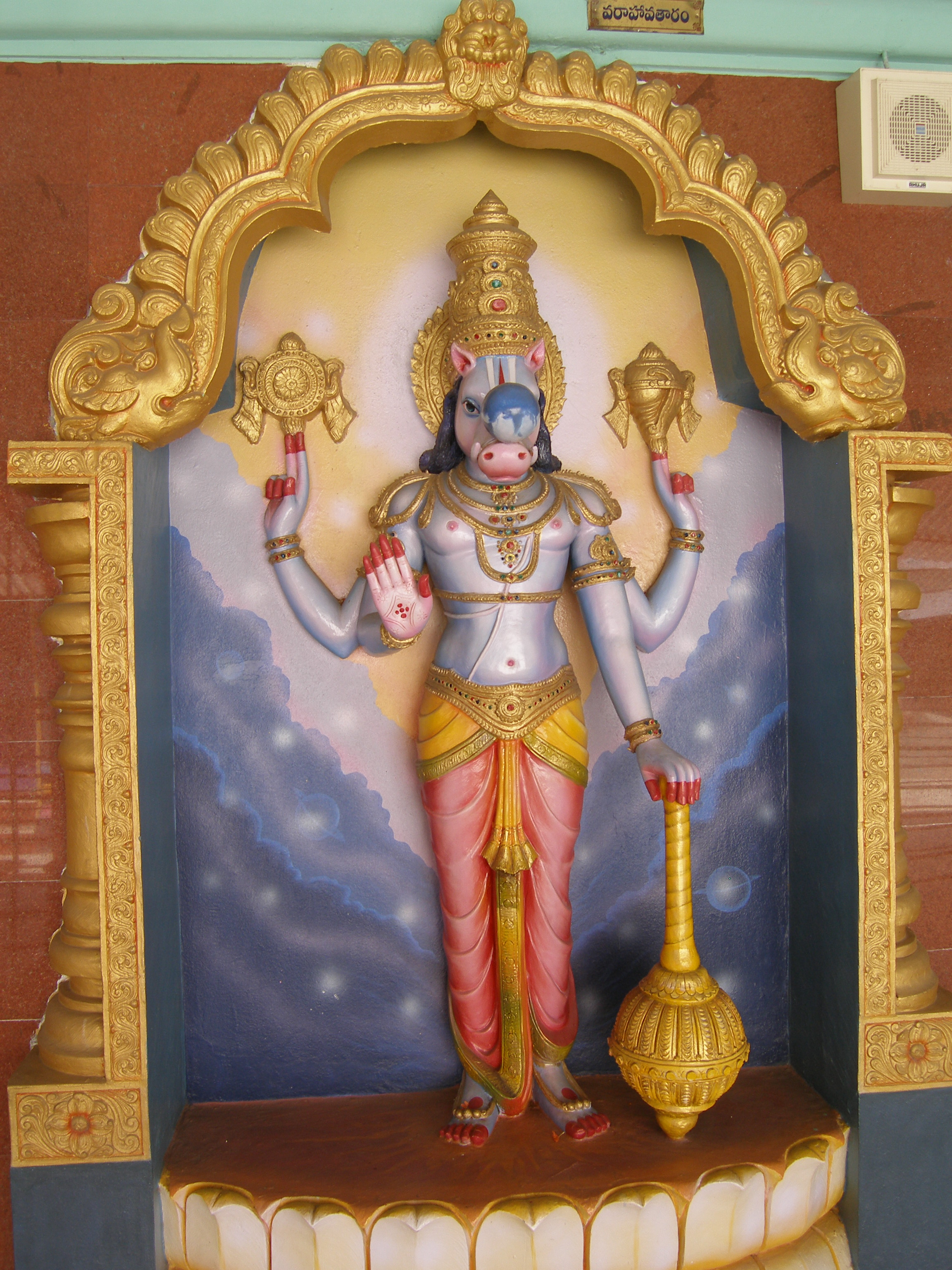
Varaha depicted as a Dashavatara in a modern temple in Srikakulam. Varaha holds the earth as a globe.

The Mahabharata lays the foundation for the avatar concept in Vishnu theology; the term pradurbhava ("manifestation") appears in the early lists, instead the term avatar. Varaha is listed as one of the four incarnations of Narayana-Vishnu who "relieve the burden of the earth" in an early list; in another list which may be a later addition to the epic, Varaha is one among eight pradurbhavas. Some manuscripts of the epic expand this list into the classical ten Dashavatara list; with Varaha listed as third or fourth pradurbhava. Varaha is also referred to Yajna-Varaha ("sacrifice boar") in some instances.

The Agni Purana, while narrating tales of the Dashavatara in sequence, briefly mentions that the Hiranyaksa, a chief of asuras (demons), defeated the gods and captured Svarga (heaven). Vishnu, in his third avatar as Varaha, slew the demons.

The Linga Purana mentions that Vishnu takes the avatars due to a curse by the sage Bhrigu. It mentions Varaha as the third of the Dashavatara. The Narada Purana, the Shiva Purana and the Padma Purana concurs placing Varaha as third of ten avatars.

The Bhagavata Purana and Garuda Purana mention Varaha as the second of 22 avatars. They describe Varaha, "the lord of sacrifices", as rescuing the earth from the netherworld or from the waters. In two other passages of the Garuda Purana, Varaha is mentioned as third of the classical Dashavatara.

The Narada Purana has a variant of Caturvyuha with Krishna, Varaha, Vamana and Balarama (Haladhara) as the four emanations.

=== Other legends and textual references ===
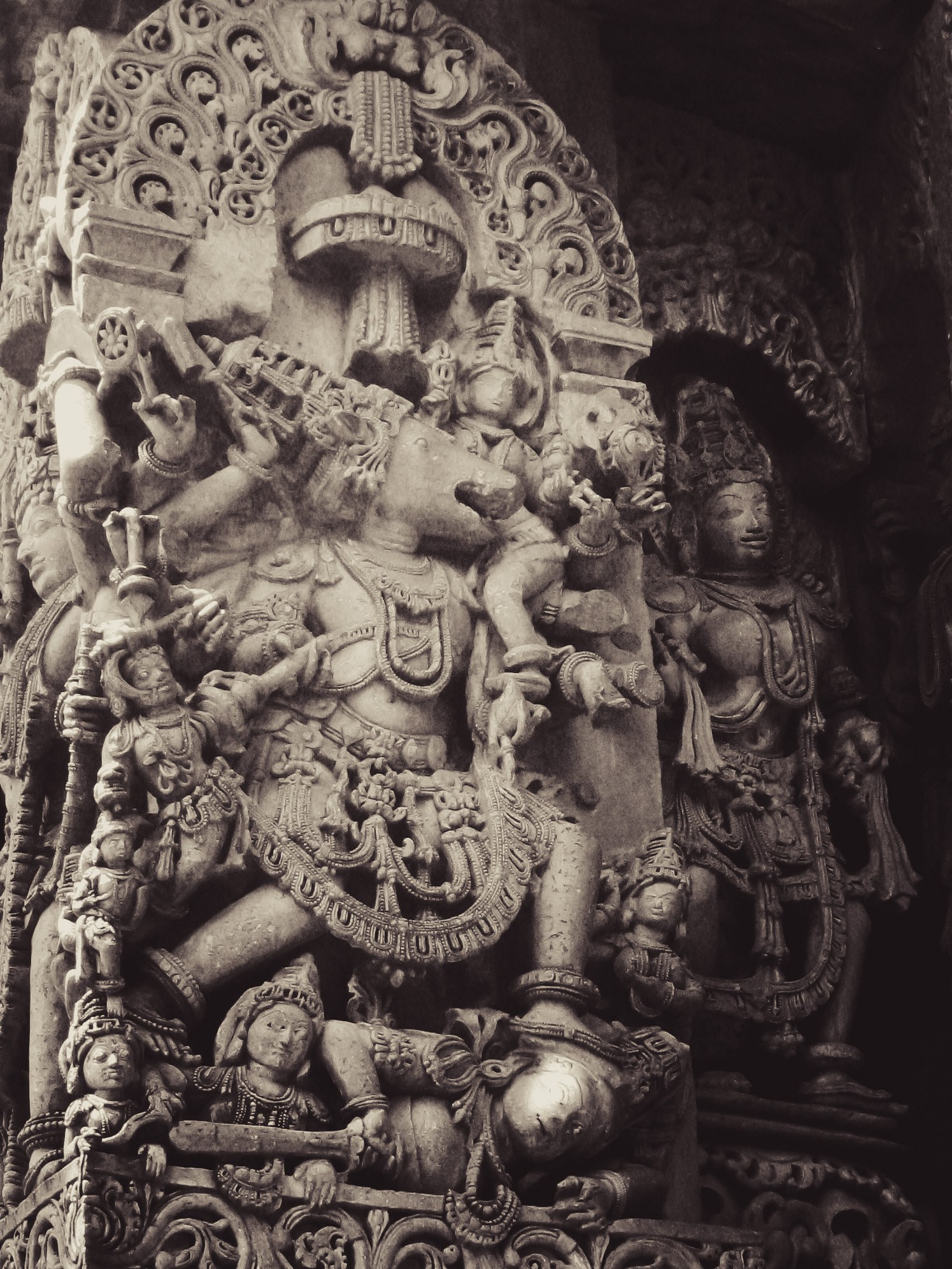
Varaha tramples the killed demon Hiranyaksha with Bhumi on his shoulder, Hoysaleshvara Temple.

The Linga Purana, the Shiva Purana and the Shaiva Khanda Book of the Skanda Purana mention Vishnu taking the Varaha form in the tale of the base of Shiva as the lingam (the aniconic symbol of Shiva) along with Brahma taking the Hamsa form in the tale of the tip of Shiva as the lingam (the aniconic symbol of Shiva). Once, Brahma and Vishnu contest for superiority. A large, fiery pillar which was Shiva himself as the lingam appears. Brahma as a hamsa (swan) flies up to find its top; while Varaha as large varaha (boar) digs down to find its bottom. However, both fail the ends of the lingam. Shiva appears in the place of lingam and enlightens them that he is the Supreme Being. The Shiva Purana says that Vishnu chose the boar form due to the animal's inborn ability to burrow in this story. It also notes that the current kalpa is known as Varaha-kalpa due to Vishnu's form as Varaha in the beginning of the kalpa when this incident happened. This tale is iconographically depicted in the Lingodbhava icon of Shiva where Shiva is shown as emerging from a fiery cosmic pillar which is he himself, while Vishnu as Varaha is seen at the base going down and Brahma as Hamsa is seen at the top going up. The Lingodbhava icon of the Shiva-worshipping Shaiva sect was aimed to counter the avatar theory of Vishnu that presented him as the Supreme Being. The icon elevated Shiva to the Supreme Being position and demoted Vishnu as inferior to Shiva by belittling the Varaha avatar of his by defeating him. Similarly, the Sharabha form of Shiva belittled Narasimha, the lion-man avatar of Vishnu by killing him.

Another legend in the minor Purana named Kalika Purana also depicts the sectarian conflicts between the Vaishnava and Shaiva sects. In this legend, Varaha lifts Bhumi by raising his tusks beneath her. Ignoring Shiva's request to abandon his boar form, Varaha travels to the mountain called Lokaloka. Thereafter, Varaha and Bhumi, in the form of a swine, enjoy an amorous dalliance. He sires three boar sons with her named Suvrtta, Kanaka, Ghora. The three boar sons create mayhem in the world. Due to his fatherly affection for his children, Varaha does not intervene in their destructive acts. The gods, headed by Indra, visit Vishnu, informing him of their plight. Vishnu suggests Brahma and the other gods to infuse Shiva with all of their power, allowing him to take the form of Sharabha. The retinues of Sharabha and Varaha, aided by Narasimha, fight. In the war, Narasimha is killed by Sharabha. Thereafter, Varaha requests Sharabha to dismember him and create implements of sacrifice from his body parts; Sharabha complies by slaying Varaha and he kills his three sons and creates implements of sacrifice from his body.

Varaha also appears in the Shakta (Goddess-oriented) narrative in the final episode of the Devi Mahatmya text embedded in the Markendeya Purana. Vishnu as Varaha creates his shakti Varahi (along with other deities, together called the eight matrika goddesses) to aid the Great Goddess to fight the demon Raktabija and they kill him.

The scripture Varaha Purana is believed to be narrated by Vishnu to Bhumi, as Varaha. The Purana is devoted more to the "myths and genealogies" connected to the worship of Vishnu. Though Varaha is praised numerous times as the saviour of the earth from the waters, the detailed legend is not given in the Purana. Bhumi praises Vishnu as Varaha who rescued her numerous times in various avatars and sees the complete universe in his mouth, when Varaha laughs. The Varaha Upanishad, a minor Upanishad, is narrated as a sermon from Varaha to the sage Ribhu.

The Agni Purana, Brahma Purana, the Markendeya Purana, the Vishnu Purana say that Vishnu resides as Varaha in Ketumala-varsha, one of the regions outside the mountains surrounding Mount Meru. The Bhagavata Purana says that Vishnu dwells as Varaha with Bhumi in the Uttara Kuru-varsha. The Vayu Purana describes an island called Varaha-dvipa near Jambudvipa, where only Vishnu as Varaha is worshipped.

== Iconography ==
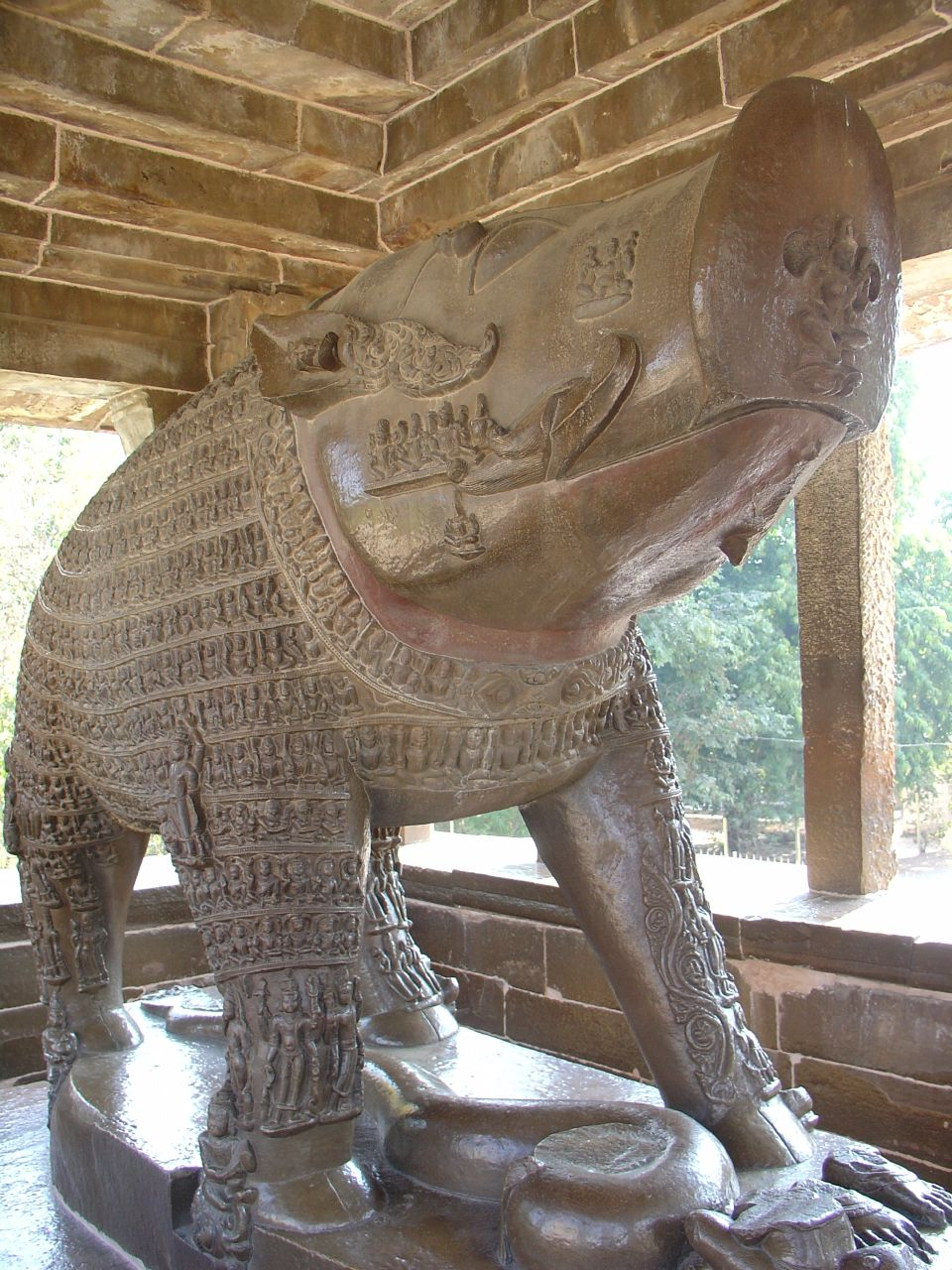
Zoomorphic Varaha, Khajuraho. On its body are carved saints, sages, gods, seven mothers and numerous beings which he symbolically protects. The goddess earth is ruined and missing.

Like Vishnu's first two avatars – Matsya (fish) and Kurma (turtle) – the third avatar Varaha is depicted either zoomorphically as a wild boar or anthropomorphically as a boar-headed man. The main difference in the anthropomorphic form portrayal is that the first two avatars are depicted with a torso of a man and the bottom half as animal, while Varaha has an animal (boar) head and a human body. The portrayal of the anthropomorphic Varaha is similar to the fourth avatar Narasimha (portrayed as a lion-headed man), who is the first avatar of Vishnu that is not completely animal.

=== Textual descriptions ===
The Agni Purana describes Varaha as having human body with boar's head. In one configuration, he carries a gada (mace), shankha (conch), padma (lotus) with Lakshmi on his left. In another form, he is depicted with the earth goddess on his left elbow and the serpent Shesha at his feet.

The Vishnudharmottara Purana describes the iconography of Nri-varaha ("human-boar"), with a human body and boar head. Varaha be depicted standing in the combative alidha pose (With a leg held straight and the other leg bent a little) on the four-armed serpent Shesha with folded arms. He holds a conch in his left land; on this elbow he supports the earth goddess who depicted with folded hands. He also holds mace, lotus and chakra (discus) and may be depicted hurling the chakra at Hiranyaksha or raising a spear at the demon. Varaha can be also depicted in meditative posture like the sage Kapila or offering pindas. He can depicted in battle surrounded by demons or zoomorphically as boar supporting the earth. The text prescribes Varaha worship for prosperity; the demon personifies adversity and ignorance while Varaha is wisdom, wealth and power.

The Matsya Purana describes that Varaha standing with the left foot on a turtle and the right foot on the hood of Shesha, holding the raised earth on his left elbow, his left hand on his Shakti (consort) to his left, and holding a lotus and mace. The lokapala deities should surround him, worshipping him.

The Narada Purana recommends Varaha be pictured as golden in complexion, having the earth on his white tusks and holding an iron-club, a conch, a discus, a sword, a javelin in his hands and making the abhayamudra (hand gesture of assurance).

The Venkatacala Mahatmya of the Skanda Purana describes a boar-faced, four-armed Varaha holding the discus and the conch, making the gestures of blessing (varadamudra) and assurance. He wears various ornaments including the Kaustubha jewel and yellow garments, with the srivatsa symbol on his chest and the earth goddess seated on his left lap.

=== Depictions ===
In the zoomorphic form, Varaha is often depicted as a free-standing boar colossus, for example, the monolithic sculpture of Varaha in Khajuraho (c. 900–925) made in sandstone, is 2.6 metres (8 ft 6 in) long and 1.7 metres (5 ft 7 in) high. The sculpture may not resemble a boar realistically, and may have his features altered for stylistic purposes. The earth, personified as the goddess Bhumi, clings to one of Varaha's tusks. Often the colossus is decorated by miniature figurines of deities, other celestail beings, sages, anthropomorphic planets, stars, other world creatures appearing all over his body, which signify the whole of creation. The goddess of speech and knowledge, Sarasvati is often depicted on his tongue, while Brahma is often depicted on his head with Shiva and Parvati on his forehead and neck. Besides Khajuraho, such sculptures are found in Eran, Muradpur, Badoh, Gwalior, Jhansi, Apasadh.

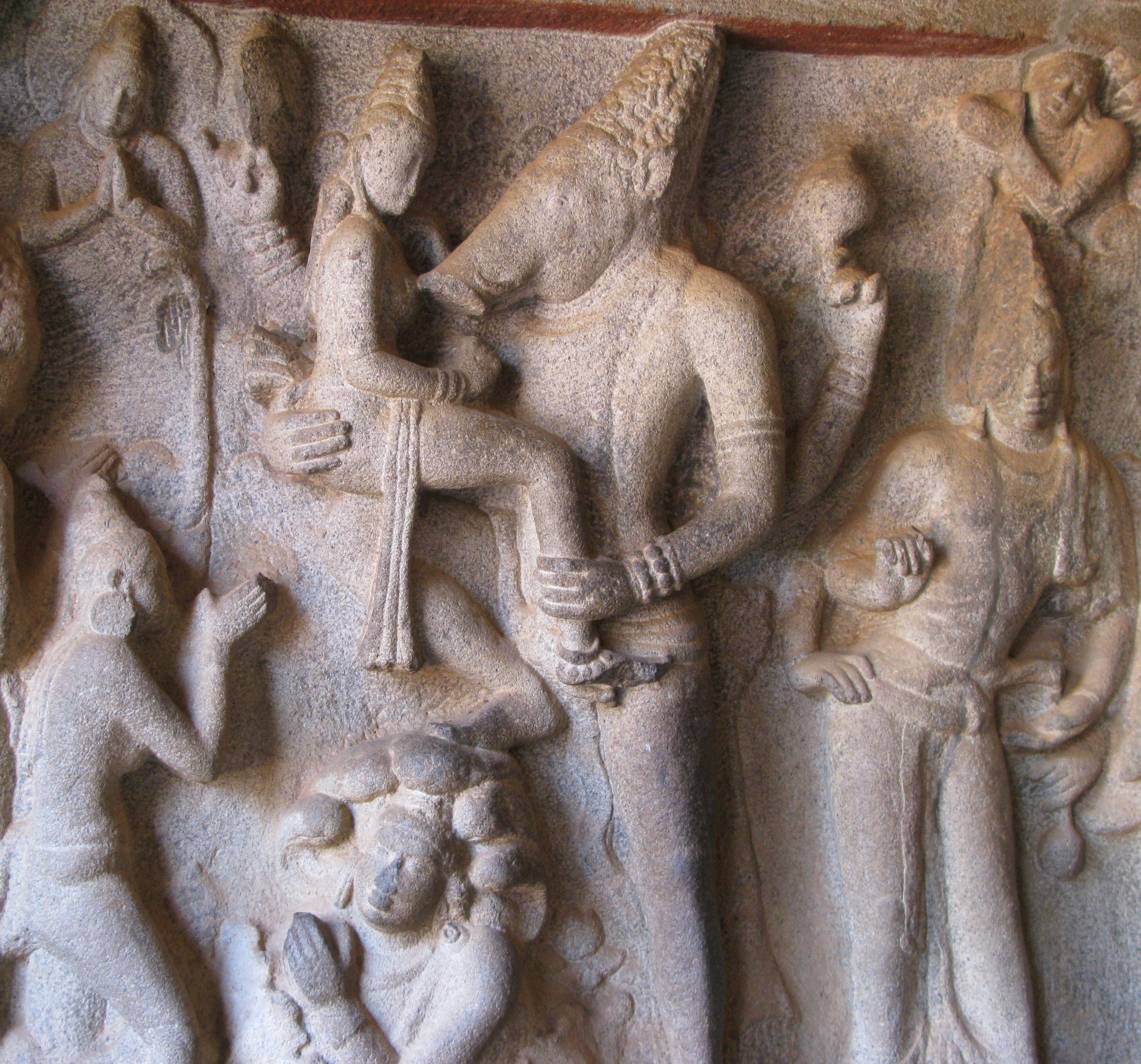
A rare right-facing Varaha holding Bhudevi, 7th century CE, Mahabalipuram.

In the anthropomorphic form, Varaha often has a stylized boar face, like the zoomorphic models. The snout may be shorter. The position and size of the tusks may also be altered. The ears, cheeks, and eyes are generally based on human ones. Early sculptors in Udayagiri and Eran faced the issue of how to attach the boar head to the human body and did not show a human neck. However, in Badami, the problem was resolved by including a human neck. While some sculptures show a mane, it is dropped and replaced by a high conical crown – typical of Vishnu iconography – in others. Varaha sculptures generally look up to the right; there are very rare instances of left-facing Varaha depictions.

Varaha has four arms, two of which hold the Sudarshana Chakra (discus) and Panchajanya (conch), while the other two hold a gada (mace), a sword, or a lotus or one of them makes the varadamudra (gesture of blessing). Varaha may be depicted with all of Vishnu'a attributes in his four hands: the Sudarshana Chakra, the Panchajanya, the gada and the lotus. Sometimes, Varaha may carry only two of Vishnu's attributes: a shankha and the gada personified as a female called Gadadevi. Varaha may also wear a vanamala - a garland of forest flowers, which is a regular characteristic in Vishnu icons. Varaha is often shown with a bulky physique and in a heroic pose. He is often depicted triumphantly emerging from the ocean as he rescues the earth.

The earth may be shown as the goddess Bhumi in Indian sculpture. Bhumi is often shown as a small figure in the icon. She may be seated on or dangling from one of Varaha's tusks, or is seated on the corner of his folded elbow or his shoulder and supports herself against the tusk or the snout, as being lifted from the waters. In later Indian paintings, the whole earth or a part of it is depicted lifted up by Varaha's tusks. In Mahabalipuram, a rare portrayal shows an affectionate Varaha looking down to Bhumi, who he carries in his arms. The earth may be portrayed as a globe, a flat stretch of mountainous land or an elaborate forest landscape with buildings, temples, humans, birds, and animals. The defeated demon may be depicted trampled under Varaha's feet or being killed in combat by Varaha. Nagas (snake gods) and their consorts Naginis (snake goddesses), residents of the underworld, may be depicted as swimming in the ocean with hands folded as a mark of devotion. Varaha may be also depicted standing on a snake or other minor creatures, denoting the cosmic waters. Sometimes, Lakshmi - Vishnu's primary consort - is depicted in the scene near the right foot of Varaha.

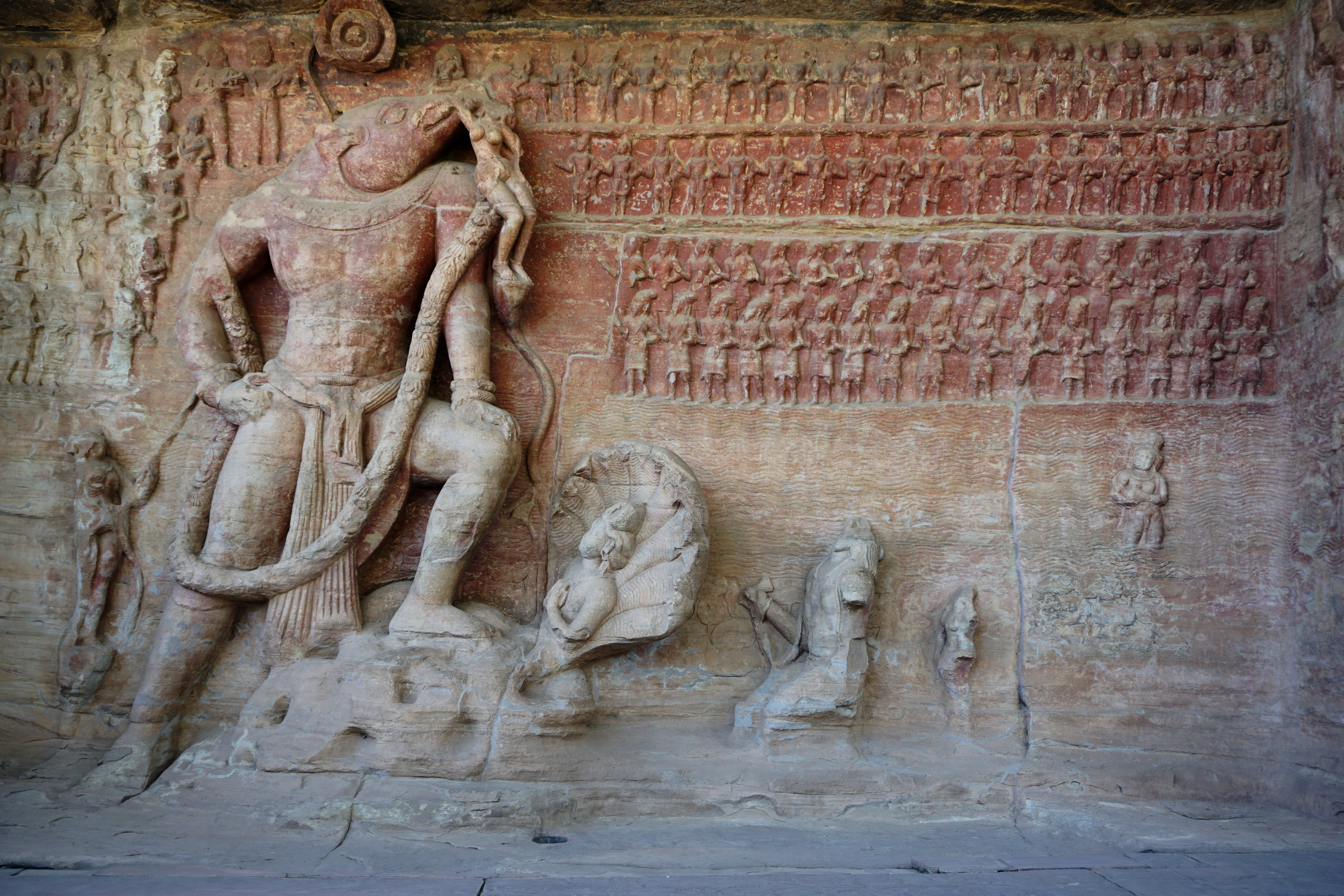
The Varaha panel in Cave 5, Udyagiri Caves, is one of the most studied reliefs from the Gupta Empire era. Circa 400 CE, reign of Chandragupta II.

The Udayagiri Varaha panel is an example of an elaborate depiction of Varaha legend. It presents the goddess earth as the dangling woman, the hero as the colossal giant. His success is cheered by a galaxy of the divine as well as human characters valued and revered in the 4th-century. Their iconography of individual characters is found in Hindu texts.

Two iconographical forms of Varaha are popular. Yajna Varaha – denoting yajna (sacrifice) – is seated on a lion-throne and flanked by Bhumi and Lakshmi. As Pralaya Varaha – indicative of lifting the earth from the stage of the pralaya (the dissolution of the universe) – he is depicted only with Bhumi. Varaha may be depicted with Lakshmi alone too. In such sculptures, he may be depicted identically to Vishnu in terms of iconography with Vishnu's attributes; the boar head identifying the icon as Varaha. Lakshmi may be seated on his thigh in such portrayals.

Varaha often features in the Dashavatara stele – where the ten major avatars of Vishnu are portrayed – sometimes surrounding Vishnu. In the Vaikuntha Vishnu (four-headed Vishnu) images, the boar is shown as the left head. Varaha's shakti (energy or consort) is the Matrika (mother goddess) Varahi, who is depicted with a boar head like the god. The Vishnudharmottara Purana prescribes Varaha be depicted as a boar in the Lingodbhava icon of Shiva.

== Evolution ==
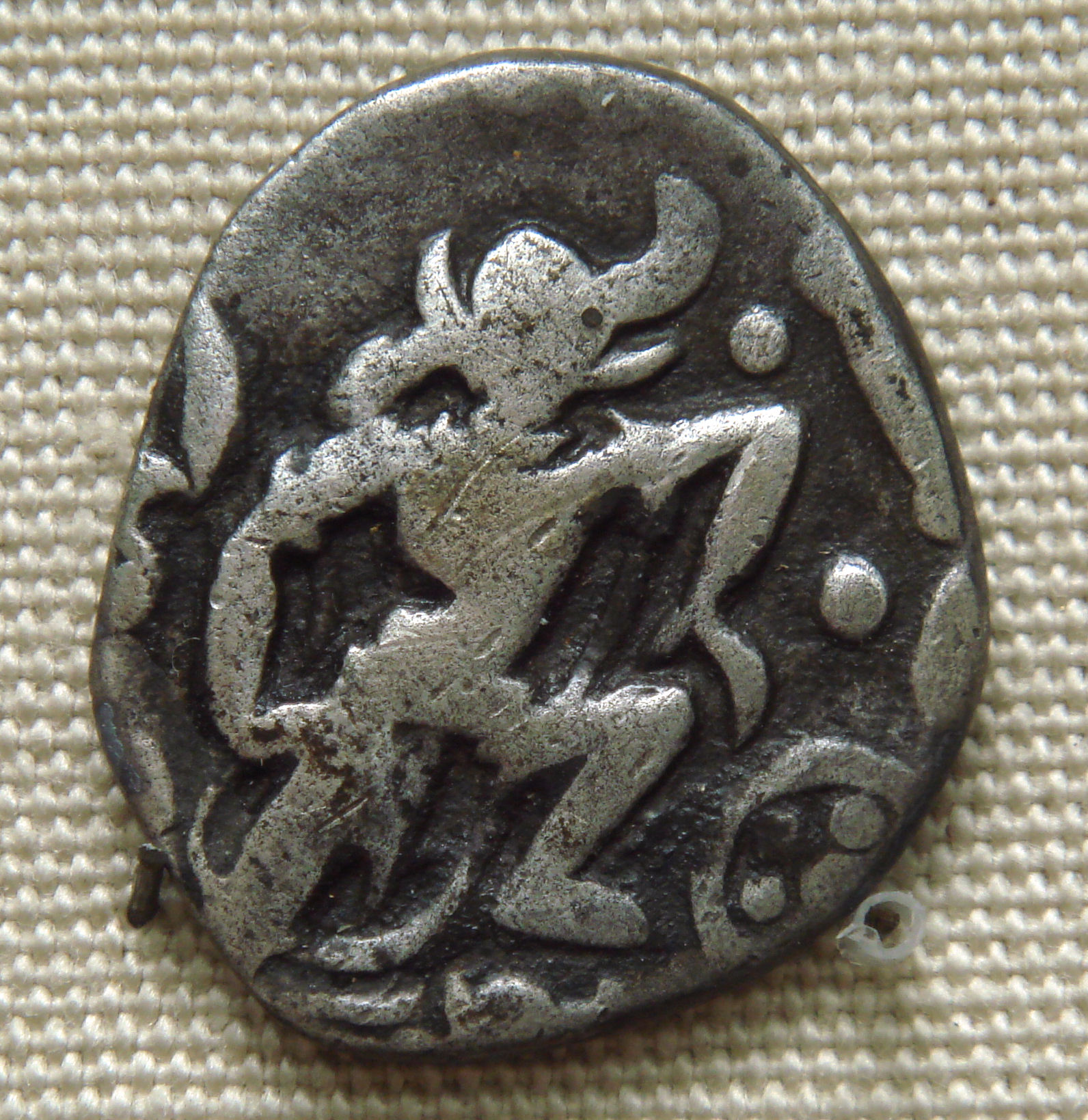
Coin with Varaha on a Gurjara-Pratihara coin possibly from the reign of King Mihira Bhoja, 850–900 CE, British Museum.

The earliest Varaha images are found in Mathura, dating to the 1st and 2nd century CE. The Gupta era (4th–6th century) in Central India temples and archaeological sites have yielded a large number of Varaha sculptures and inscriptions; signifying cult worship of the deity in this period. These include the anthropomorphic version in Udayagiri Caves and the zoomorphic version in Eran. Other early sculptures exist in the cave temples in Badami in Karnataka (6th century) and Varaha Cave Temple in Mahabalipuram (7th century); both in South India and Ellora Caves (7th century) in Western India. By the 7th century, images of Varaha were found in all regions of India, including Kashmir in the north. By the 10th century, temples dedicated to Varaha were established in Khajuraho (existent, but worship has ceased), Udaipur, Jhansi (now in ruins) etc. The boar was celebrated in the first millennium as a "symbol of potency".

The Chalukya dynasty (543–753) was the first dynasty to adopt Varaha in their crest and minted coins with Varaha on it. The Gurjara-Pratihara king Mihira Bhoja (836–885 CE) assumed the title of Adi-varaha and also minted coins depicting the Varaha image. Varaha was also adopted as a part of royal insignia by the Chola (4th century BCE–1279 CE) and Vijayanagara Empires (1336–1646 CE) of South India. In Karnataka, a zoomorphic image of Varaha is found in a carving on a pillar in Aihole, which is interpreted as the Vijayanagara emblem, as it is seen along with signs of a cross marked Sun, a disc and a conch.

However, the boar and its relative the pig started being seen as polluting since the 12th century, due to Muslim influence on India. Muslims consider the pig unclean. This led to a "change of attitude" towards Varaha. While Varaha once enjoyed cult following particularly in Central India, his worship has declined significantly today.

According to historian Dr. Suniti Kumar Chatterjee, Boro people trace their mythological origins to Varaha.

Some academics believe the Varaha avatara is a single-horned rhino, rather than a boar although it was disproven .

== Symbolism ==
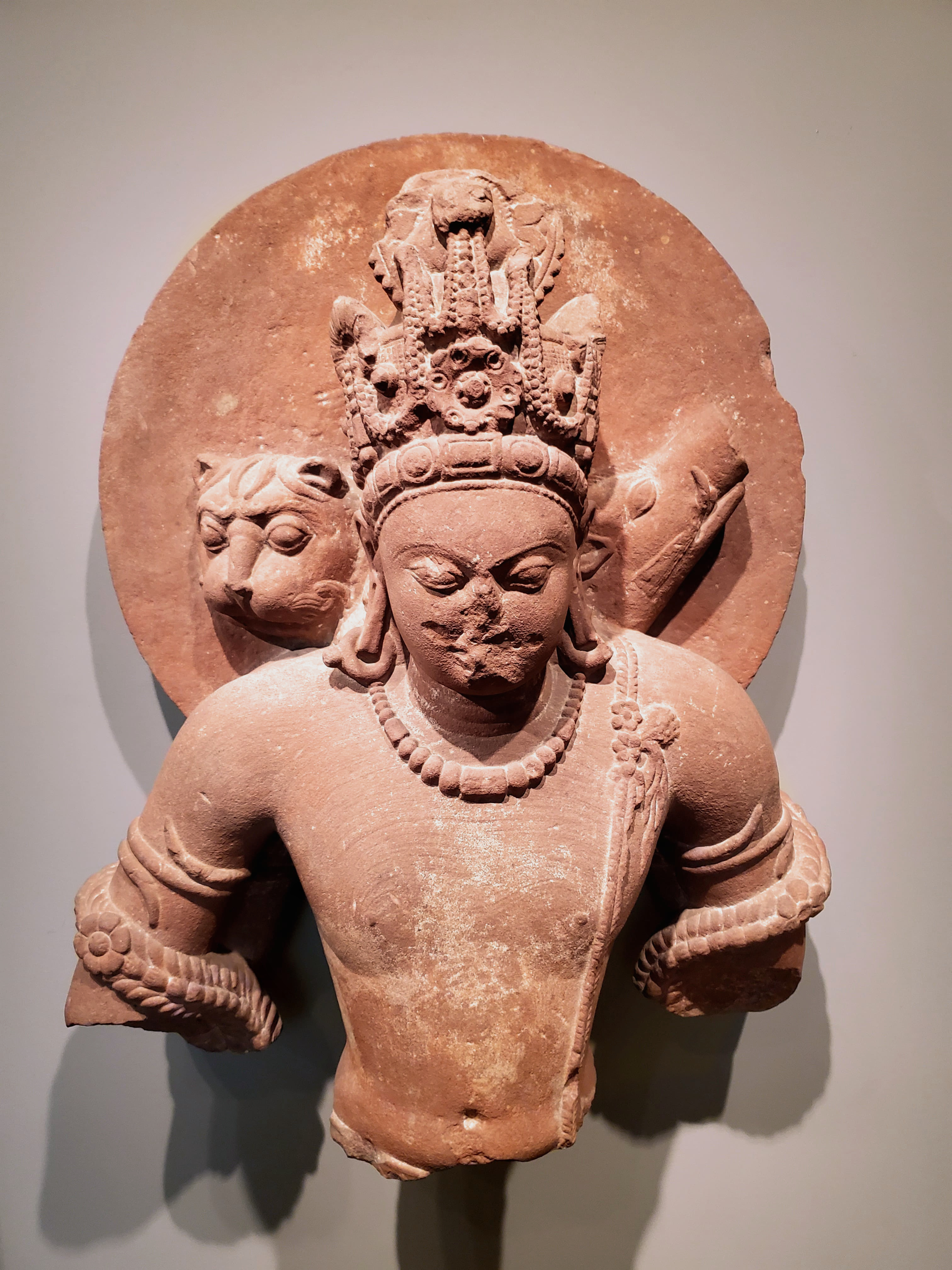
Varaha as the left head in the Vaikuntha Chaturmurti icon of Vishnu. Mathura, Gupta period, mid-5th century CE. Boston Museum.

Varaha represents yajna (sacrifice), as the eternal upholder of the earth. Varaha is the embodiment of the Supreme Being who brings order amidst chaos in the world by ritual sacrifice. Various scriptures reiterate Varaha's identification with sacrifice, comparing his various body parts to implements and participants of a sacrifice. According to H.H. Wilson, the legend of Varaha symbolizes the resurrection of the earth from sin by sacred rituals. Vishnu is identified with sacrifice; Bhatta Bhaskara identifies Varaha with the sutya day in soma sacrifices, when the ritual drink of soma was consumed. A theory suggests that Varaha's identification with Sacrifice streams from the early use of a boar as sacrificial animal.

In royal depictions of Varaha, the icon is interpreted to allude to the Rajasuya sacrifice for royal consecration or Ashvamedha sacrifice to establish to establish sovereignty. The Varaha icon describes the role of a warrior king, rescuing goddess earth (kingdom) from a demon who kidnaps her, torments her and the inhabitants. It is a symbolism for the battle between right versus wrong, good versus evil, and of someone willing to go to the depths and do what is necessary to rescue the good, the right, the dharma. He is the protector of the innocent goddess and the weak who have been imprisoned by the demonic forces. The sculpture typically show the symbolic scene of the return of Varaha after he had successfully killed the oppressive demon Hiranyaksha, found and rescued goddess earth (Prithivi, Bhumi), and the goddess is back safely. Whether in the zoomorphic form or the anthropomorphic form, the victorious hero Varaha is accompanied by sages and saints of Hinduism, all gods including Shiva and Brahma. This symbolizes that just warriors must protect the weak and the bearers of all forms of knowledge and that the gods approve of and cheer on the rescue.

Various holy books state that the boar form was taken to rescue the earth from the primordial waters, as the animal likes to play in the water. Wilson speculates that the legend may be an allusion to a deluge or evolution of "lacustrine" mammals in the earth's early history.

Another theory associates Varaha with tilling of the land for agriculture. When the boar tills the land with its tusk in nature, plants sprouts in the spot quickly. In the context of agriculture, Roy associates Varaha with the cloud, referring the Vedic etymology of varaha and similar to the Germanic association of the pig with "cloud, thunder and storm". The boar, as the cloud, ends the demon of summer or drought.

Various theories associate the Orion constellation with Varaha; though the constellation is also associated with other deities. In autumn, Vishnu or Prajapati (the Sun) enters the southern hemisphere (equated with the netherworld or the ocean), while returns as Orion, the boar, on the spring equinox.

In the Vaikuntha Chaturmurti icon when associated with the Chaturvyuha concept, Varaha is associated with the hero Aniruddha and energy.

== Worship ==
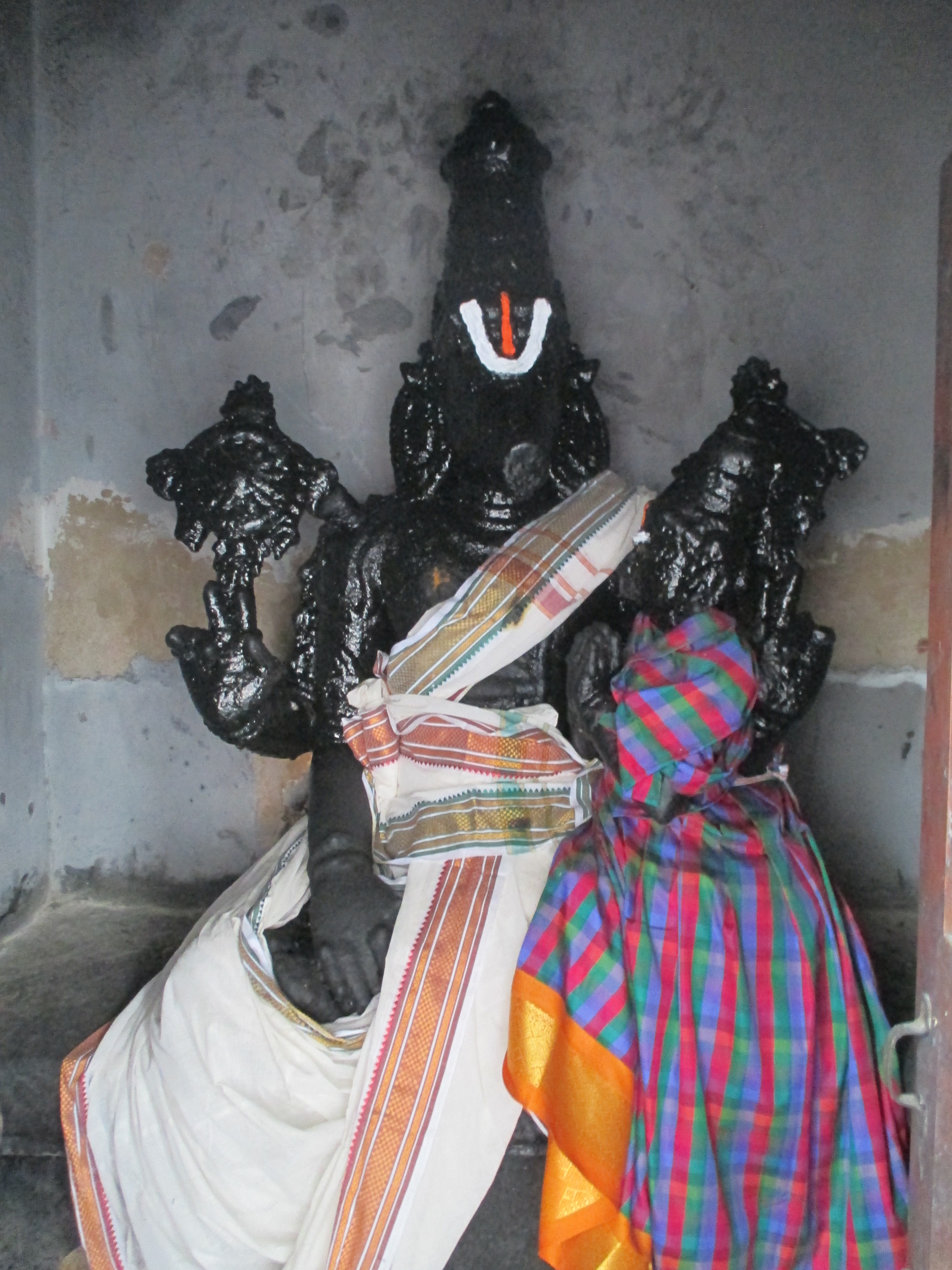
Varaha with his consort on his lap, worshipped as a subsidiary deity in the Sundaravarada Perumal temple dedicated to Vishnu.

The Agni Purana prescribes that Varaha be in the north-east direction in Vishnu temples or worship. Installation of the icon of Varaha is said to bestow one with sovereignty, prosperity and moksha (emancipation).

The Narada Purana mentions Varaha's mantra "Om namo Bhagavate Varaharupaya Bhurbhuvassvah pataye Bhupatitvam me dehi dadapaya svaha" and recommends Varaha to be worshipped for kingship. A shorter mantra "Om bhu varahay namah" is also given for gaining prosperity. Varaha is prescribed to be worshipped for ucchatana (eradication) of foes, ghosts, poison, disease, "evil planets". The one-syllabed mantra hum for Varaha is also noted. The Bhagavata Purana invokes Varaha for protection while travelling. The Venkatacala Mahatmya of the Skanda Purana mentions the mantra of Varaha as Om Namah Srivarahaya Dharanyuddharanaya Ca Svaha ("Saluation to Varaha who lifted the Earth"). The Agni Purana and the Garuda Purana associate the mantra Bhuh with Varaha.

The Garuda Purana recommends the worship of Varaha for sovereignty. A vrata involving the worship of a gold Varaha image on ekadashi (eleventh lunar day) in bright half of Magha month (i.e. Bhaimi Ekadakshi), is told in the Garuda Purana and the Narada Purana. Varaha Jayanti, the birthday of Varaha, is celebrated on the third lunar day in the bright fortnight of the Bhadrapada month. The worship of Varaha and overnight vigil (jagran) with Vishnu tales being told are prescribed on this day.

The Vishnu Sahasranama embedded in the thirteenth Book Anushasana Parva of the epic is a hymn listing the thousand names of Vishnu. The Varaha legend is alluded to in the following epithets: Mahibharta ("husband of the earth"), Dharanidara ("one who upholds the earth", may also refer to other Vishnu forms - Kurma, Shesha or Vishnu in general), Maha-varaha ("the great boar"), Kundara ("One who pierced the earth"), Brihadrupa ("who takes form of a boar"), Yajnanga ("whose body is yajna or sacrifice) and Vaikhana ("one who dug the earth"). The epithet Kapindra ("Kapi-Lord") may refer to Varaha or Rama avatar, depending the interpretation of the word kapi as boar or monkey respectively. The title Shringi ("horned") generally interpreted as Matsya, may also refer to Varaha. The Vishnu Sahasranama version from the Garuda Purana mentions Shukura (Boar) as an epithet of Vishnu. The Padma Purana includes Varaha in a hundred-name hymn of Vishnu. The thousand-name hymn version in the Padma Purana mentions that Vishnu is Varaha, the protector of sacrifices and destroyer of those who obstruct them.

=== Temples ===
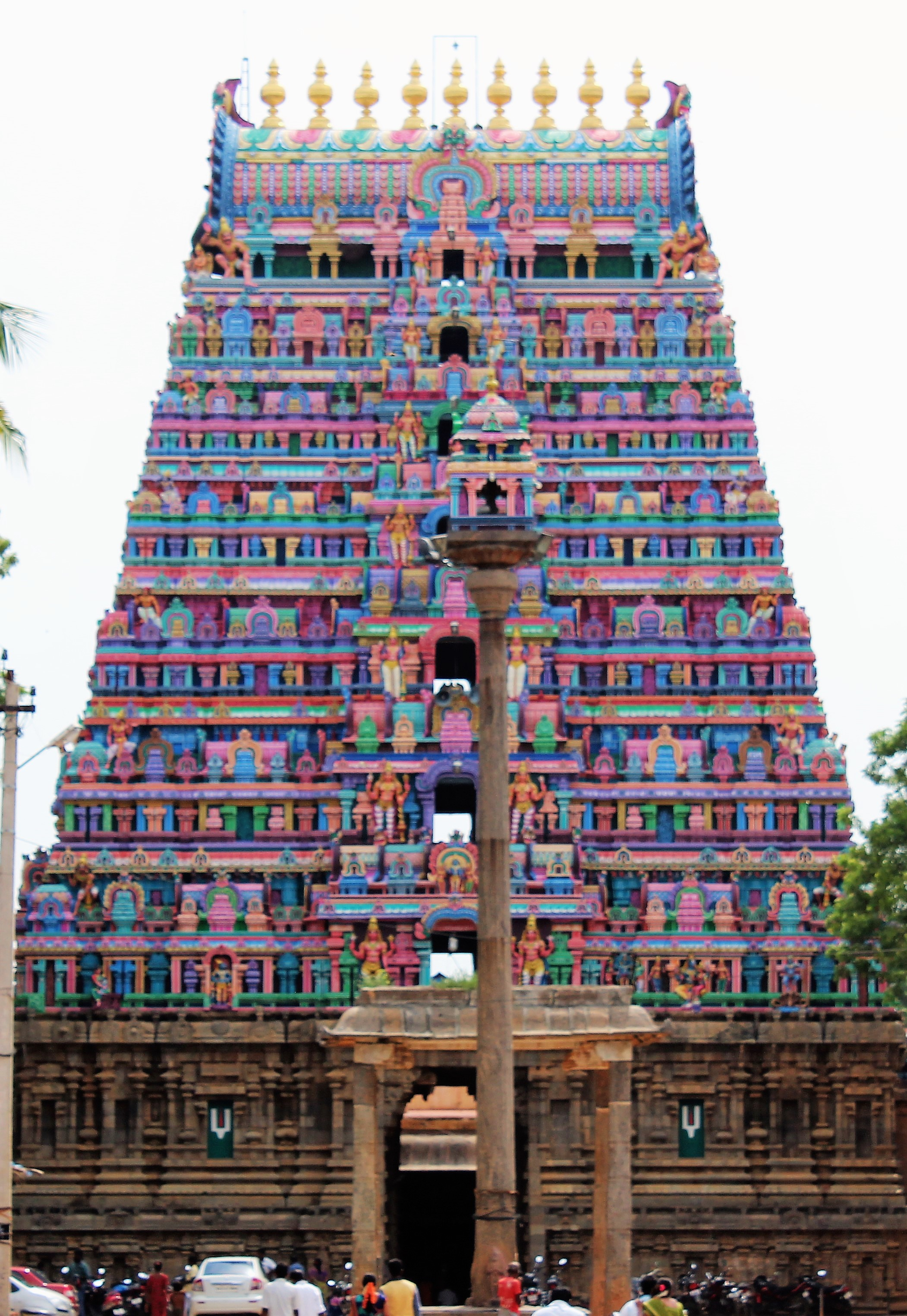
Bhuvarahasvami Temple in Srimushnam.

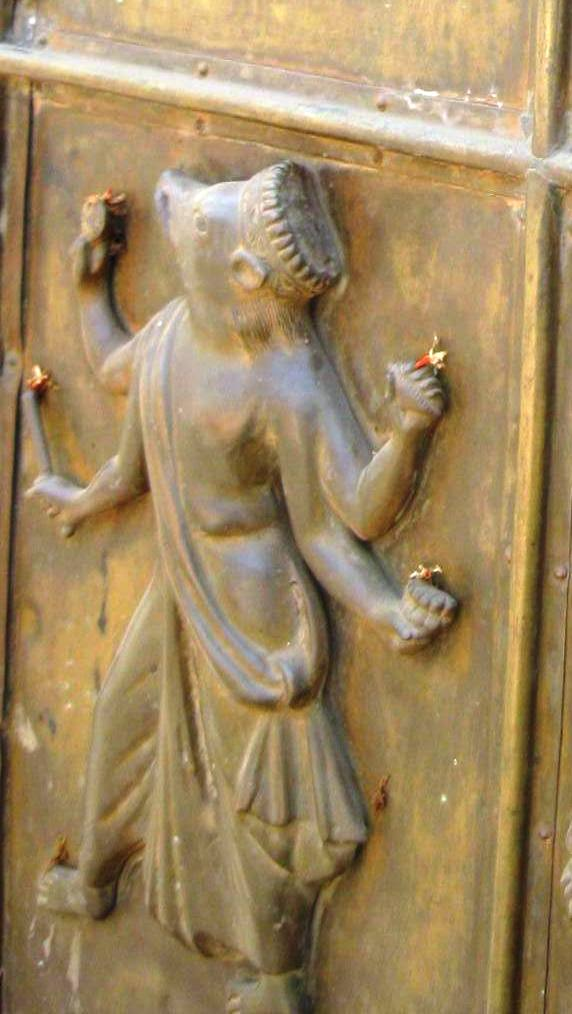
Varaha Avatar on a brass chariot of Searsole Rajbari, West Bengal, India

The most prominent temple of Varaha is the Sri Varahaswami Temple in Tirumala, Andhra Pradesh. It is located on the shores of a temple pond, called the Svami Pushkarini, in Tirumala, near Tirupati; to the north of the Tirumala Venkateshvara Temple (another temple of Vishnu in the form of Venkateshvara). The region is called Adi-Varaha Kshestra, the abode of Varaha. According to legend, at the end of Satya Yuga (the first in the cycle of four aeons; the present one is the fourth aeon), devotees of Varaha requested him to stay on earth, so Varaha ordered his mount Garuda to bring his divine garden Kridachala from his abode Vaikuntha to Venkata hills, Tirumala. Venkateswara is described as having taken the permission of Varaha to reside in these hills, where his chief temple, Tirumala Venkateswara Temple, stands. Hence, pilgrims are prescribed to worship Varaha first and then Venkateswara. In the Atri Samhita (Samurtarchanadhikara), Varaha is described to be worshipped in three forms here: Adi Varaha, Pralaya Varaha and Yajna Varaha. The image in the sanctum is of Adi Varaha.

The Venkatacala Mahatmya of the Skanda Purana says that Varaha resides with Bhudevi on the banks of the Svami Pushkarini lake, Tirupati. Varaha is said to rest there in the jungle after rescuing the earth. Varaha roams in the forest near the lake as a lustrous boar. A tribal chief called Vasu follows the boar, who enters an anthill. Vasu digs the anthill but cannot trace the boar, finally swoons due to fatigue. His son finds him. Varaha possesses Vasu and instructs him to inform the king Tondaman to build his temple at the place. Varaha is also presented as the narrator of the tale of Venkateshvara, whose chief temple is in Tirupati, to the Earth in a part of Venkatacala Mahatmya.

Another important temple is the Bhuvarahaswami Temple in Srimushnam, Tamil Nadu. It was built in the late 16th century by Krishnappa II, a Thanjavur Nayak ruler. The image of Varaha is considered a swayambhu (self-manifested) image, one of the eight self-manifested Swayamvyakta kshetras. An inscription in the prakaram (circumambulating passage around the main shrine) quotes from the legend of the Srimushna Mahatmaya (a local legend), describing the piety one derives in observing festivals during the 12 months of the year when the sun enters a particular zodiacal sign. This temple is venerated by Hindus and Muslims alike. Both communities take the utsava murti (festival image) in procession during the annual temple festival in the Tamil month of Masi (February–March). The god is credited with many miracles and called Varaha sahib by Muslims.

The Varaha temple in Pushkar is also included in the Swayamvyakta kshetra list. The Garuda Purana says Varaha performs a sacrifice near Pushkar lake in every Kartika month. The Padma Purana narrates that Brahma organizes a great sacrifice in Pushkar for the benefit of the universe. Varaha, appears there as the embodiment of Sacrifice (his sacrificial attributes are reiterated), to protect the sacrifice against any obstruction or evil. Brahma requests Varaha to always reside in and protect the sacred place of Pushkar (identified with Kokamukha).

Varaha shrines are also included in Divya Desams (a list of 108 abodes of Vishnu). They include Adi Varaha Perumal shrine Tirukkalvanoor, located in the Kamakshi Amman Temple complex, Kanchipuram and Thiruvidandai, 15 km from Mahabalipuram.

Another pilgrimage place where Varaha resides is mentioned in the Brahma Purana near Vaitarana river and Viraja temple, Utkala (modern-day Odisha) (See Varahanatha Temple).

In Muradpur in West Bengal, worship is offered to an in-situ 2.5-metre (8 ft 2 in) zoomorphic image of Varaha (8th century), one of the earliest known images of Varaha. A 7th-century anthropomorphic Varaha image of Apasadh is still worshipped in a relatively modern temple. Other temples dedicated to Varaha are located across India in the states of Andhra Pradesh (including Varaha Lakshmi Narasimha temple, Simhachalam dedicated to a combined form of Varaha and Narasimha), in Haryana Pradesh at Baraha Kalan, and Lakshmi Varaha Temple, in Karnataka at Maravanthe and Kallahalli, Panniyur Sri Varahamurthy Temple in Kerala, Sreevaraham Lakshmi Varaha temple, Thiruvananthapuram in Kerala, Sree Varaha Swamy Temple, Varapuzha in Ernakulam, Kerala, Azheekal Sree Varaha Temple in Ernakulam, Kerala, in Majholi, Madhya Pradesh, in Odisha at Lakshmi Varaha Temple, Aul, in Tamil Nadu and in Uttar Pradesh. A Varaha temple is also located in Mysore Palace premises at Mysore, Karnataka. The Varahashyam temple in Bhinmal, Rajasthan also has an 8 ft Varaha icon.

In the Neo-Vaishnavite tradition of Assam, the legends of Vishnu avatars are actively kept alive across generations through local traditional drama performances known as Bhaona. Srimanta Sankardev was a revolutionary figure who taught the philosophy of Vishnu to the local people.

A person portrays Varaha in a spiritual manner in an Assamese drama (Bhaona) from Assam.

He established namghars and created a traditional drama system around 1468 AD, through which different mythological avatars are depicted and good moral values are taught to humans. The traditional drama was performed at night, accompanied by beautiful musical instruments—khol and Taal, and the performances had a spiritual character, including a distinctive walking style (gati and phut), a speaking style (the Brajavali language), and acting styles (angika and sattvika abhinaya). In this way, performers had to maintain discipline to play a spiritual role in the namghar. Sankardev translated different spiritual texts and wrote in the local language; one of these is Nrisingha Yatra , which depicts Varaha and Narasimha. When both mythological avatars appear in the performance, they give traditional gamosa, betel nuts and leaves, and offer prayers by touching the feet. It is the moment when people can express their thoughts to God and gain knowledge of moral values.

== See also ==
- Varaha Upanishad
- Narasimha
- Varahi

== Bibliography ==
- Aiyangar, Narayan (1901). Essays On Indo Aryan Mythology. Madras: Addison and Company.
- Brockington, J. L. (1998). The Sanskrit Epics. BRILL Academic. ISBN 90-04-10260-4.
- Dutt, Manmatha Nath (1896). Markandeya Puranam. Elysium Press.
- Lochtefeld, James G. (2002). The Illustrated Encyclopedia of Hinduism: A-M. The Rosen Publishing Group. ISBN 0-8239-2287-1.
- Nagar, Shanti Lal (2005). Brahmavaivarta Purana. Parimal Publications.
- Nanditha Krishna (2009). Book Of Vishnu. Penguin Books India. ISBN 978-0-14-306762-7.
- Nanditha Krishna (2010). Sacred Animals of India. Penguin Books India. ISBN 978-0-14-306619-4.
- Rao, T.A. Gopinatha (1914). "Dasavataras of Vishnu: The Varahavatara". Elements of Hindu iconography. Vol. 1: Part I. Madras: Law Printing House. pp. 128–145.
- Roy, J. (2002). Theory of Avatāra and Divinity of Chaitanya. Atlantic. ISBN 978-81-269-0169-2.
- Wilson, H. H. (Horace Hayman) (1862). The Vishnu Purána : a system of Hindu mythology and tradition. Works by the late Horace Hayman Wilson. Vol. VI. Princeton Theological Seminary Library. London : Trübner.
  - Wilson, H. H. (Horace Hayman) (1862b). The Vishnu Purána : a system of Hindu mythology and tradition. Works by the late Horace Hayman Wilson. Vol. VII. Princeton Theological Seminary Library. London : Trübner.
  - Wilson, H. H. (Horace Hayman) (1862a). The Vishnu Purána : a system of Hindu mythology and tradition. Works by the late Horace Hayman Wilson. Vol. X. Princeton Theological Seminary Library. London : Trübner.
- Shastri, J.L. (1990) [1951]. Linga Purana - English Translation - Part 1 of 2. Vol. 1. Motilal Banarsidass Publishers Pvt. Ltd.
- Shastri, J. L.; Bhatt, G. P.; Gangadharan, N. (1998) [1954]. Agni Purana. Motilal Banarsidass Publishers Pvt. Ltd.
- Tagare, G. V. (2002) [1958]. Brahmanda Purana. Vol. I. Motilal Banarsidass Publishers Pvt. Ltd.
  - Tagare, G. V. (2002a) [1958]. Brahmanda Purana. Vol. I. Motilal Banarsidass Publishers Pvt. Ltd.
- Talukdar of Oudh (1916). The Matsya Puranam.
- Tagare, G. V. (1960). The Vayu Purana. Vol. 1. Motilal Banarsidass Publishers Pvt. Ltd.
  - Tagare, G. V. (1960a). The Vayu Purana. Vol. 2. Motilal Banarsidass Publishers Pvt. Ltd.
- Brahma Purana. UNESCO collection of Representative Works - Indian Series. Motilal Banarsidass. 1955.
- The Garuda Purana. Vol. 1. Motilal Banarsidas. 2002 [1957].
  - The Garuda Purana. Vol. 2. Motilal Banarsidas. 2002 [1957].
  - The Garuda Purana. Vol. 3. Motilal Banarsidas. 2002 [1957].
- Gupta, Anand Swarup (1972). The Kūrma Purāṇa (with English translation). All-India Kashi Raj Trust.
- The Narada Purana. Vol. 1. Motilal Banarsidas. 1995 [1950].
  - The Narada Purana. Vol. 3. Motilal Banarsidas. 1997 [1952].
  - The Narada Purana. Vol. 4. Motilal Banarsidas. 1997 [1952].
  - The Narada Purana. Vol. 5. Motilal Banarsidas. 1952.
- Shastri, J. L. (2002) [1950]. The Śiva Purāṇa. Vol. 1. Motilal Banarsidas.
  - Shastri, J. L. (2000) [1950]. The Śiva Purāṇa. Vol. 2. Motilal Banarsidas.
  - Shastri, J. L. (2002a) [1950]. The Śiva Purāṇa. Vol. 4. Motilal Banarsidas.
- Shastri, J. L.; Tagare, G. V. (1999) [1950]. The Bhāgavata Purāṇa. Motilal Banarsidas.
- Deshpande, Dr. N A (1988). Padma Purana. UNESCO collection of Representative Works - Indian Series. Vol. 1. Motilal Banarsidas.
  - Deshpande, Dr. N A (1989). Padma Purana. UNESCO collection of Representative Works - Indian Series. Vol. 2. Motilal Banarsidas.
  - Padma Purana. Vol. 3. Motilal Banarsidas. 1999 [1951].
  - Padma Purana. Vol. 7. Motilal Banarsidas. 1952.
  - Padma Purana. Vol. 9. Motilal Banarsidas. 1956.
- Shah, Priyabala (1990). Shri Vishnudharmottara. The New Order Book Co.
- The Varaha Purana. UNESCO collection of Representative Works - Indian Series. Vol. 1. Motilal Banarsidas. 1960.
- The Skanda Purana. Vol. 3. Motilal Banarsidas. 1990 [1951].
  - The Skanda Purana. Vol. 4. Motilal Banarsidas. 1951.
  - The Skanda Purana. Vol. 12. Motilal Banarsidas. 2003 [1955].
- Dutt, Manmatha Nath, ed. (1897). A Prose English Translation Of Harivamsha. Elysium Press.
- Becker, Catherine (2010). "Not Your Average Boar: The Colossal Varāha at Erāṇ, an Iconographic Innovation". Artibus Asiae. 2. 70 (1): 123–149. JSTOR 20801634.
- Verma, A. (2012). Temple Imagery from Early Mediaeval Peninsular India. Ashgate. ISBN 978-1-4094-3029-2.
