= Sreevaraham Lakshmi Varaha Temple, Thiruvananthapuram =

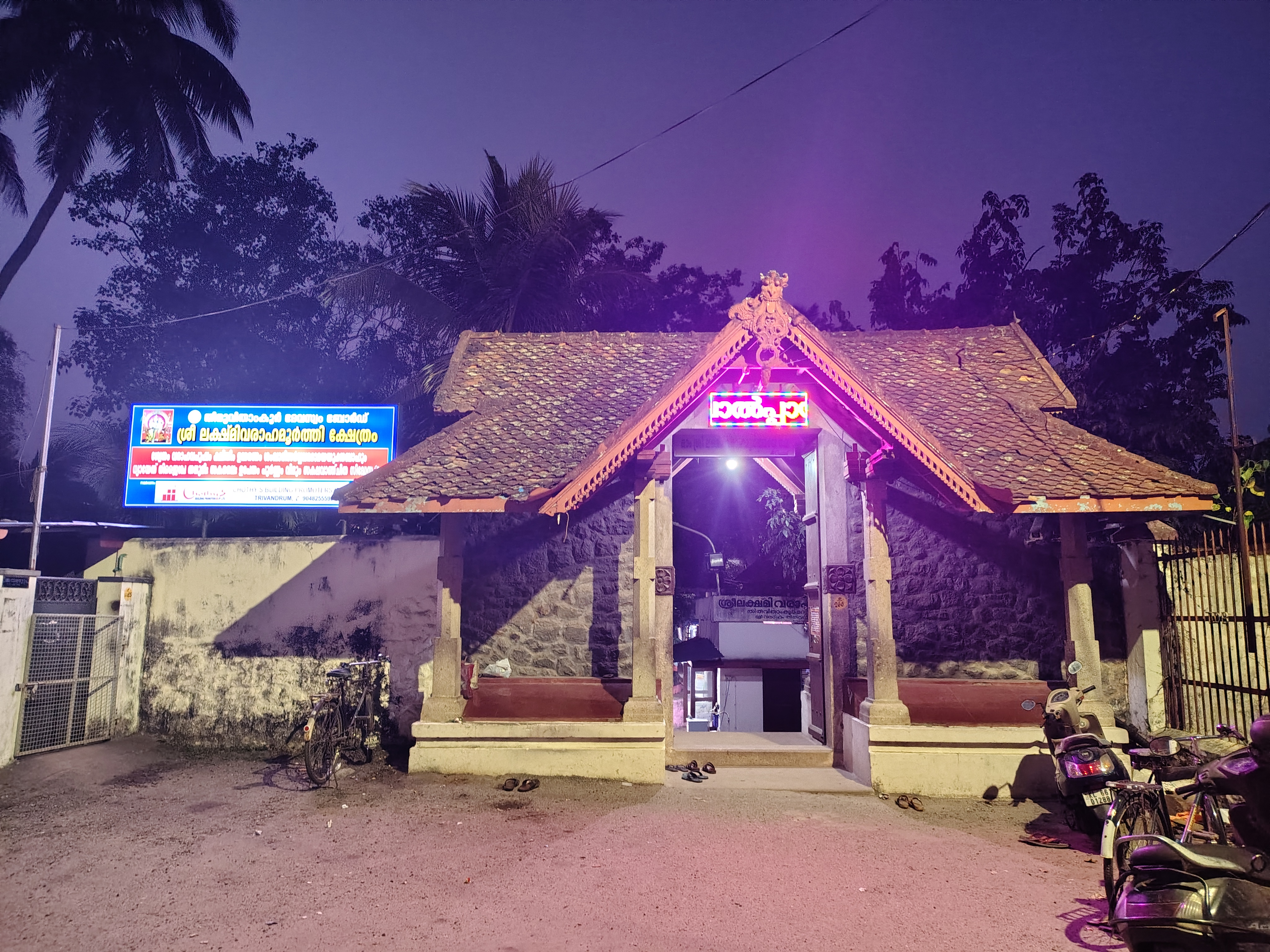

- Sreevaraham Lakshmi Varaha Temple, Thiruvananthapuram, Kerala

Religion
- Affiliation: Hinduism
- District: Thiruvananthapuram
- Deity: Lakshmi Varahar
- Festivals: Festival in the Malayalam month of Meenam, Varaha Jayanthi

Location
- Location: Thiruvananthapuram
- State: Kerala
- Country: India
- Interactive map of Sreevaraham Lakshmi Varaha Temple, Thiruvananthapuram
- Coordinates: 8°28′38.6″N 76°56′32.6″E

Architecture
- Type: Architecture of Kerala

Specifications
- Temple: One
- Elevation: 37.01 m (121 ft)

Sreevaraham Lakshmi Varaha Temple, locally known as Sreevaraham Temple, is a Hindu temple in Sreevaraham, Thiruvananthapuram, near to the Padmanabhaswamy Temple. The principal deity of the temple is Varaha, the third avatar of the god Vishnu.

The temple is administered by the Travancore Devaswom Board.

== Deities ==
The main deity is Lakshmi Varaha - Varaha sitting with his consort Lakshmi on his lap. The sub-deities are Ganapathy, Krishna, Nagaraja, Yakshiamma and others.

== Importance ==
The principal deity of the temple is Varaha, the third avatar of Vishnu. This is one of the few temples in India where Lakshmi is depicted with Varaha. Only three temples of Varaha exist in Kerala.

== Architecture ==
The temple is of typical Kerala style architecture and the sanctum is round in shape and its roof is covered with copper plates. The 'nalambalam' which is the outer structure is square shaped. There is a golden flag post in the temple.

The temple pond is the largest temple pond in Kerala and has an area of 2.5 acre

== Offerings ==
Offerings that are common in other Vishnu temples are done here also which includes 'Archana, Ganapathy Homam, Ashtothararchana, Thrimadhuram, Paalpayasam, Unniyappam, Thulabaram and so on.

== Festivals ==
The main festival is in the Malayalam month of Meenam (mid March -mid April) and during the same period of 'Painguni Festival' of Padmanabhaswamy temple. Varaha Jayanthi in the Malayalam month of Meenam is also celebrated in a grand manner.
