= Varaha Temple, Khajuraho =

Temple in India

Varaha Temple
- वराह मंदिर
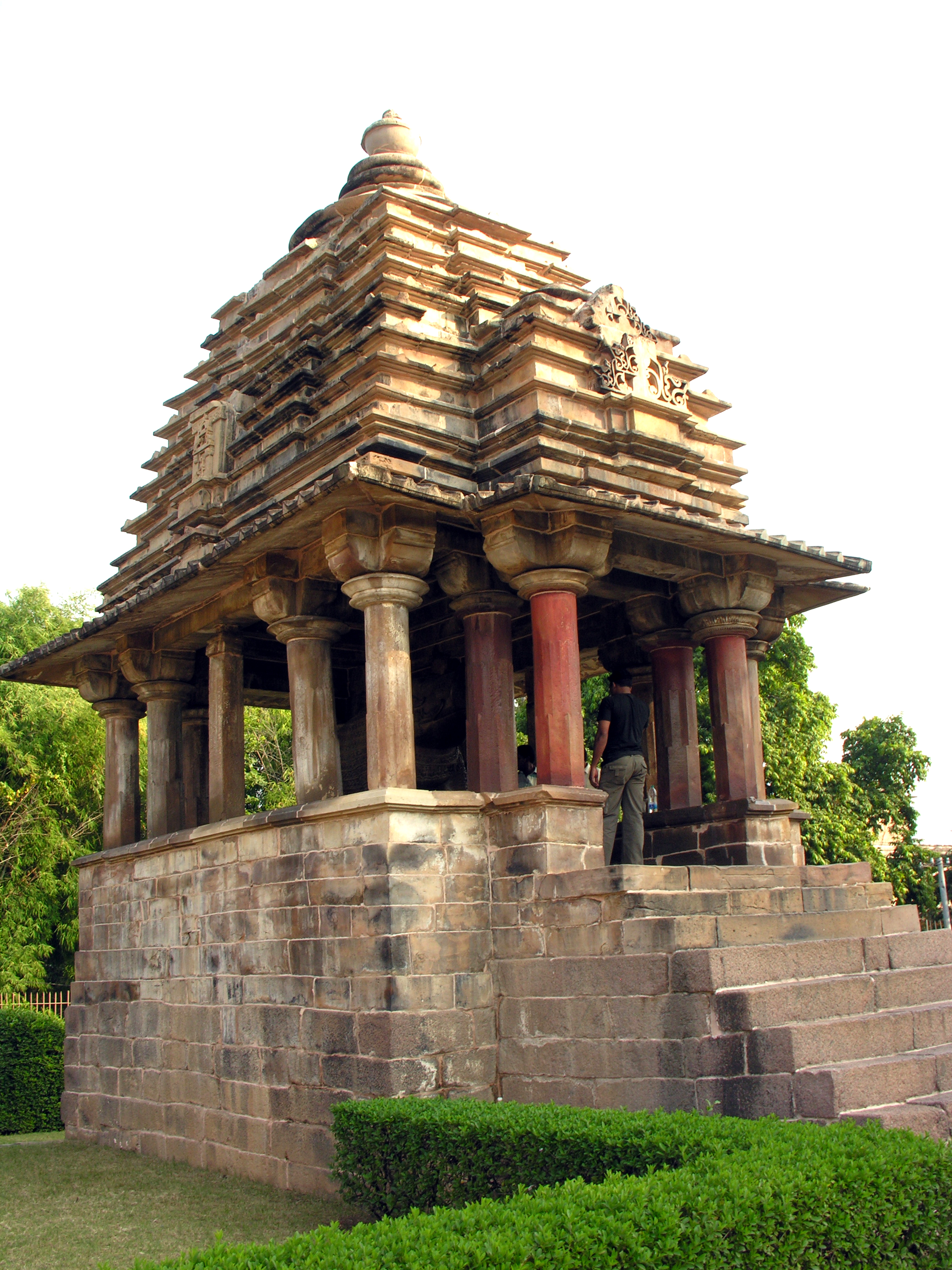
- Varaha temple at Khajuraho

- Location in Madhya Pradesh

Religion
- Affiliation: Hinduism
- District: Chattarpur, Khajuraho
- Deity: Varaha, Incarnation of Vishnu

Location
- Location: Khajuraho
- State: Madhya Pradesh
- Country: India
- Interactive map of Varaha Temple
- Coordinates: 24°51′7.3″N 79°55′20″E

Architecture
- Creator: Chandela Rulers
- Completed: CIRCA 900–925 AD
- Temple: 1

The Varaha Temple at Khajuraho (Devanagri: वराह मंदिर) enshrines a colossal monolithic image of Varaha, the boar avatar of the Hindu god Vishnu. This temple depicts Varaha as a purely animal form. The temple is located in the Western Group of Temple Complex Khajuraho Group of Monuments, a World Heritage Site inscribed by UNESCO in 1986 because of its outstanding architecture and testimony to the Chandela dynasty. Khajuraho is a small village in Chattarpur District of Madhya Pradesh, India.

== Legend ==
Vishnu appeared in the form of a boar in order to defeat Hiranyaksha, a demon who had taken the Earth (represented as the goddess Bhudevi) and carried her to the bottom of the cosmic ocean. After batting for a thousand years, Varaha slew the demon. He carried the Earth out of the ocean between his tusks and restored her to her place in the universe. Vishnu married Bhudevi in this avatar.

== Description ==
The Varaha Temple is one of the monuments among Khajuraho Group of Monuments, a World Heritage Site in India. It is dated to c. 900–925 AD. Inside the temple complex, Varaha Temple is located next (South) to Lakshmi Temple and opposite to Lakshman Temple.

== Architecture ==
The Varaha Shrine, built on a lofty plinth, is simple and modest. It has an oblong pavilion with a pyramidal roof of receding tiers, resting on fourteen plain pillars. The shrine is built entirely of sandstone.

The statue of Varaha is 2.6 m long and 1.7 high. The sculpture is colossal and monolithic and made of sandstone. The sculpture is carved with numerous figures on its entire body (also seen in image). The sculpture carved between nose and mouth, depicts goddess Saraswati carrying Veena in her arms.

== Gallery ==
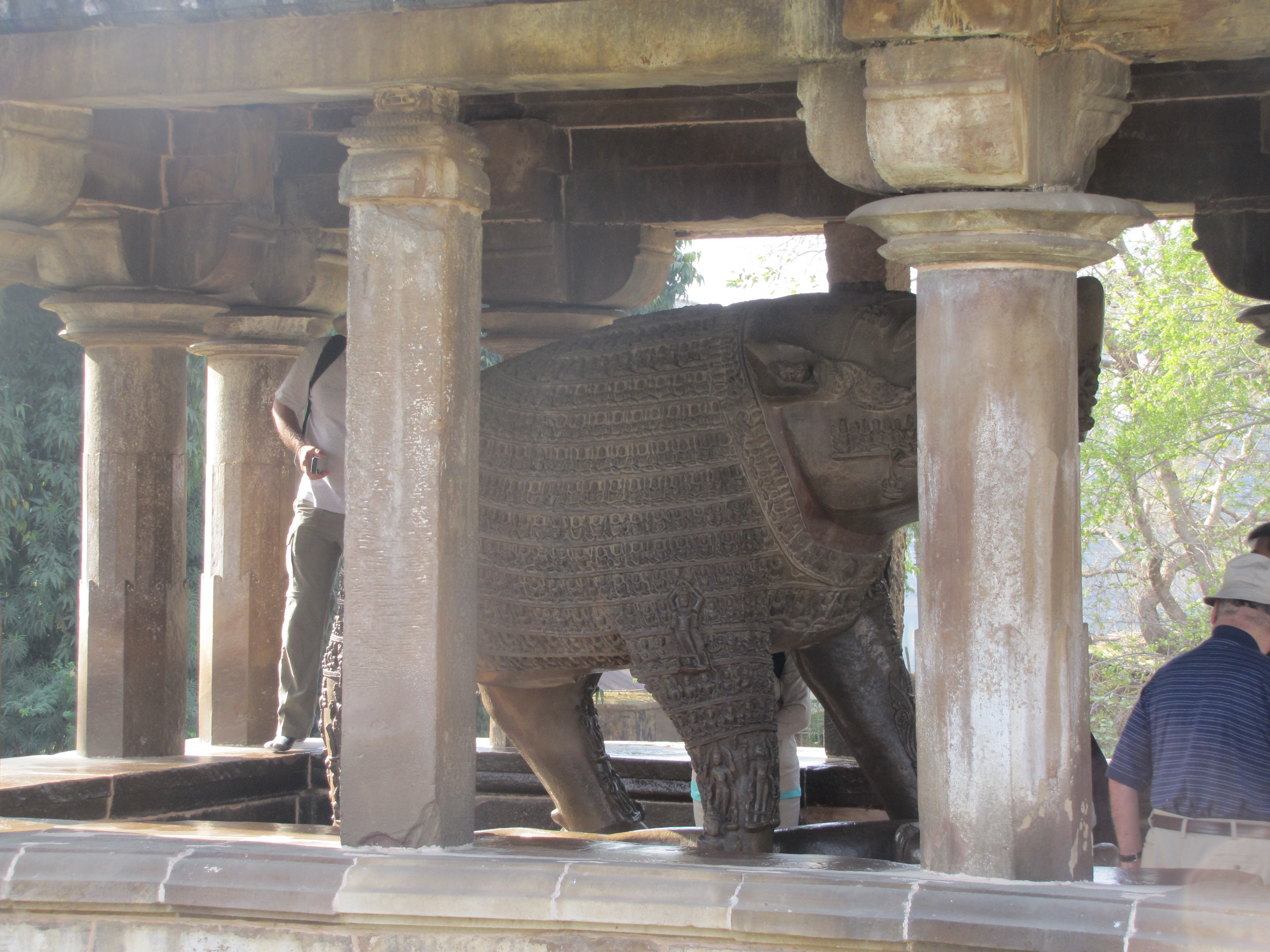
Varaha Temple, Khajuraho India.

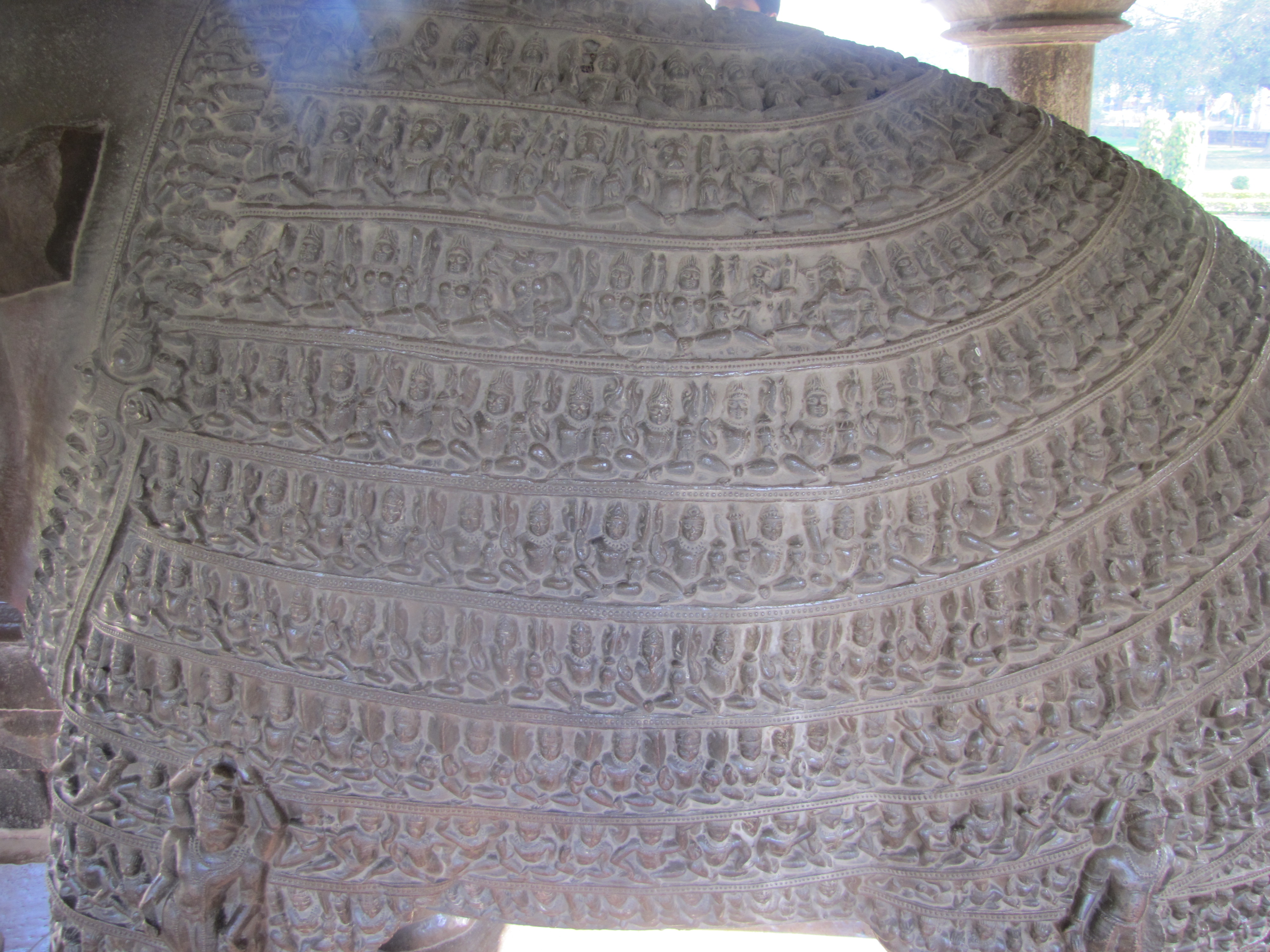
Varaha Temple, Khajuraho India.

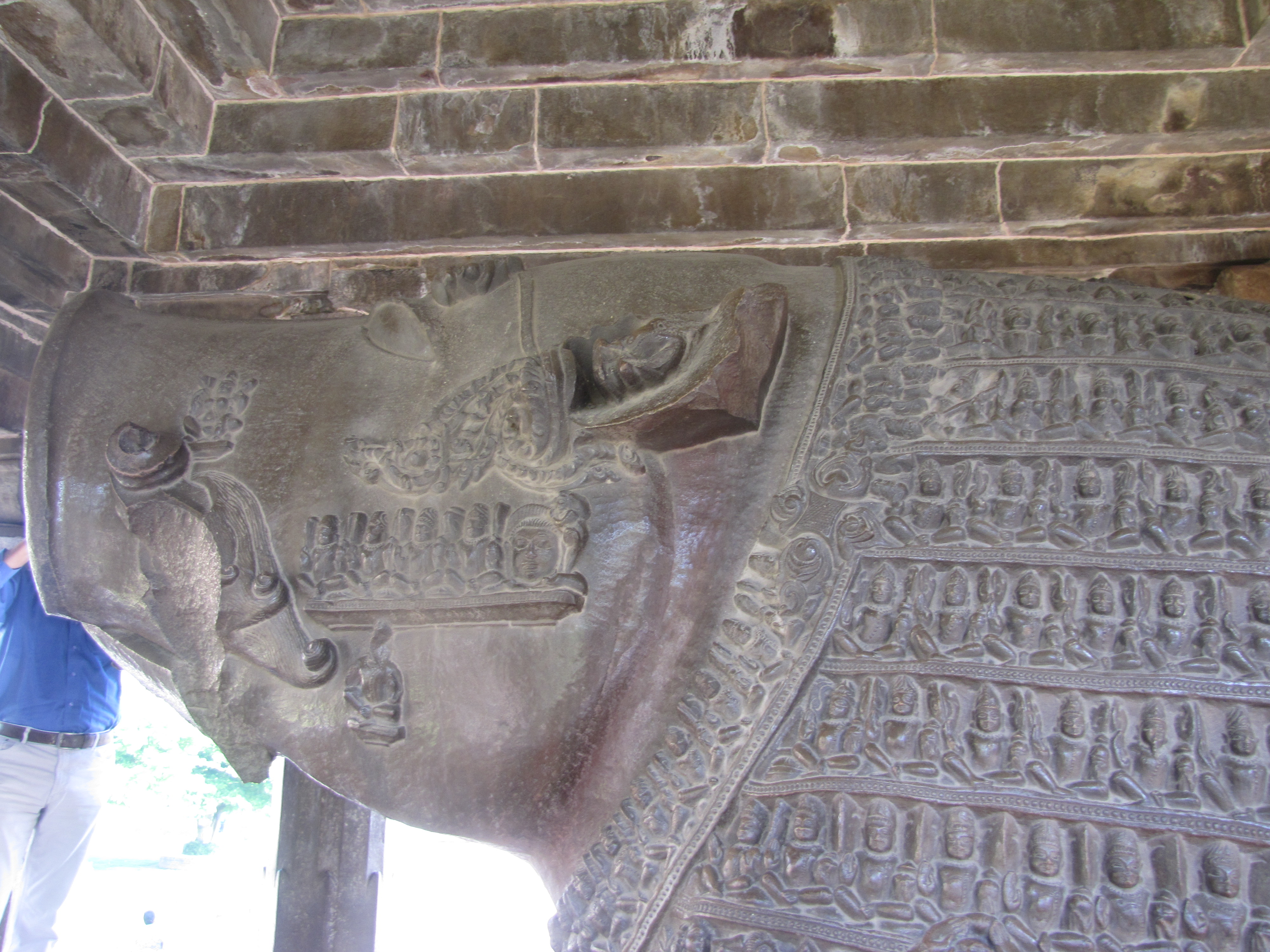
Varaha Temple, Khajuraho India.

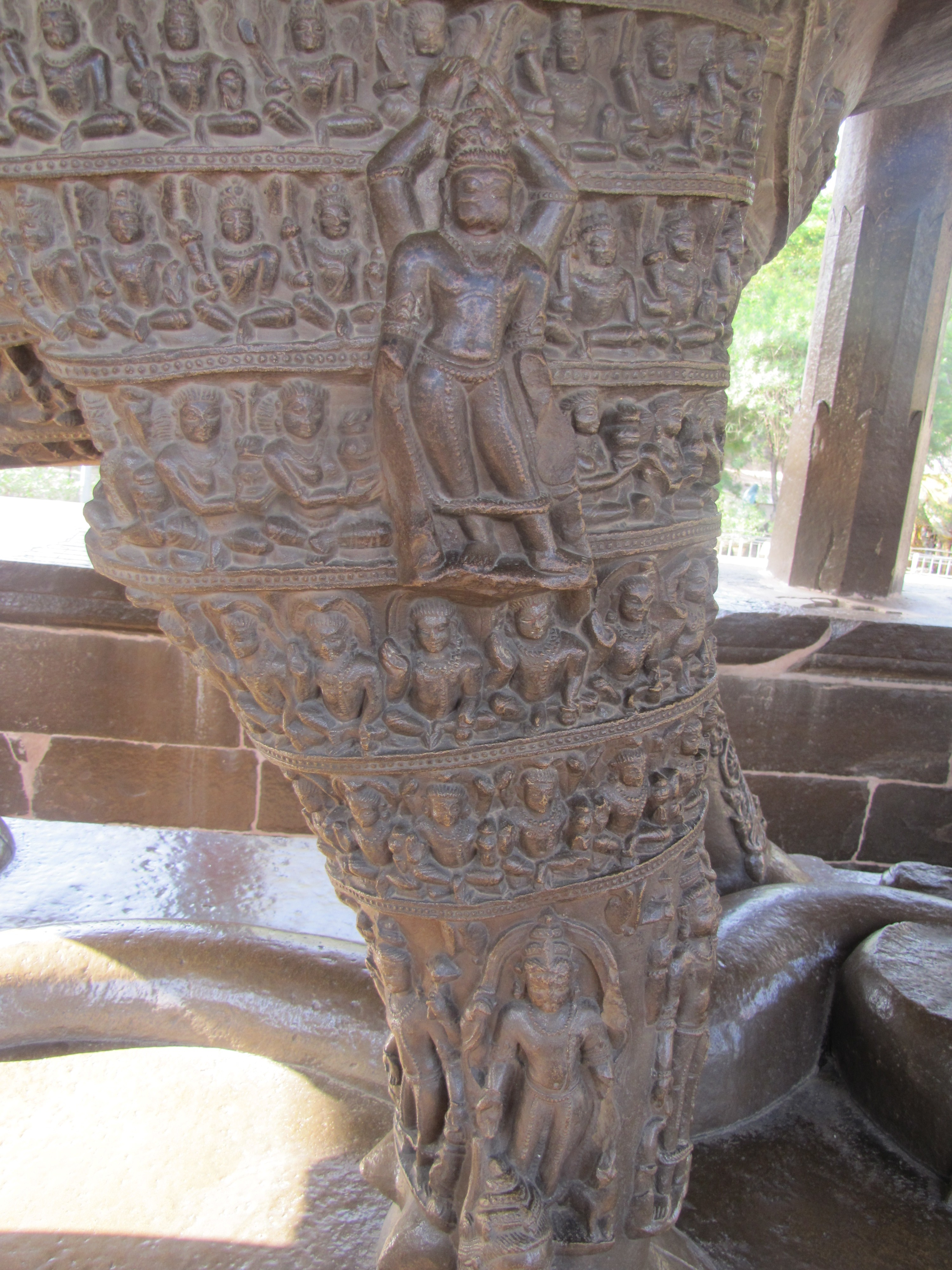
Varaha Temple, Khajuraho India.

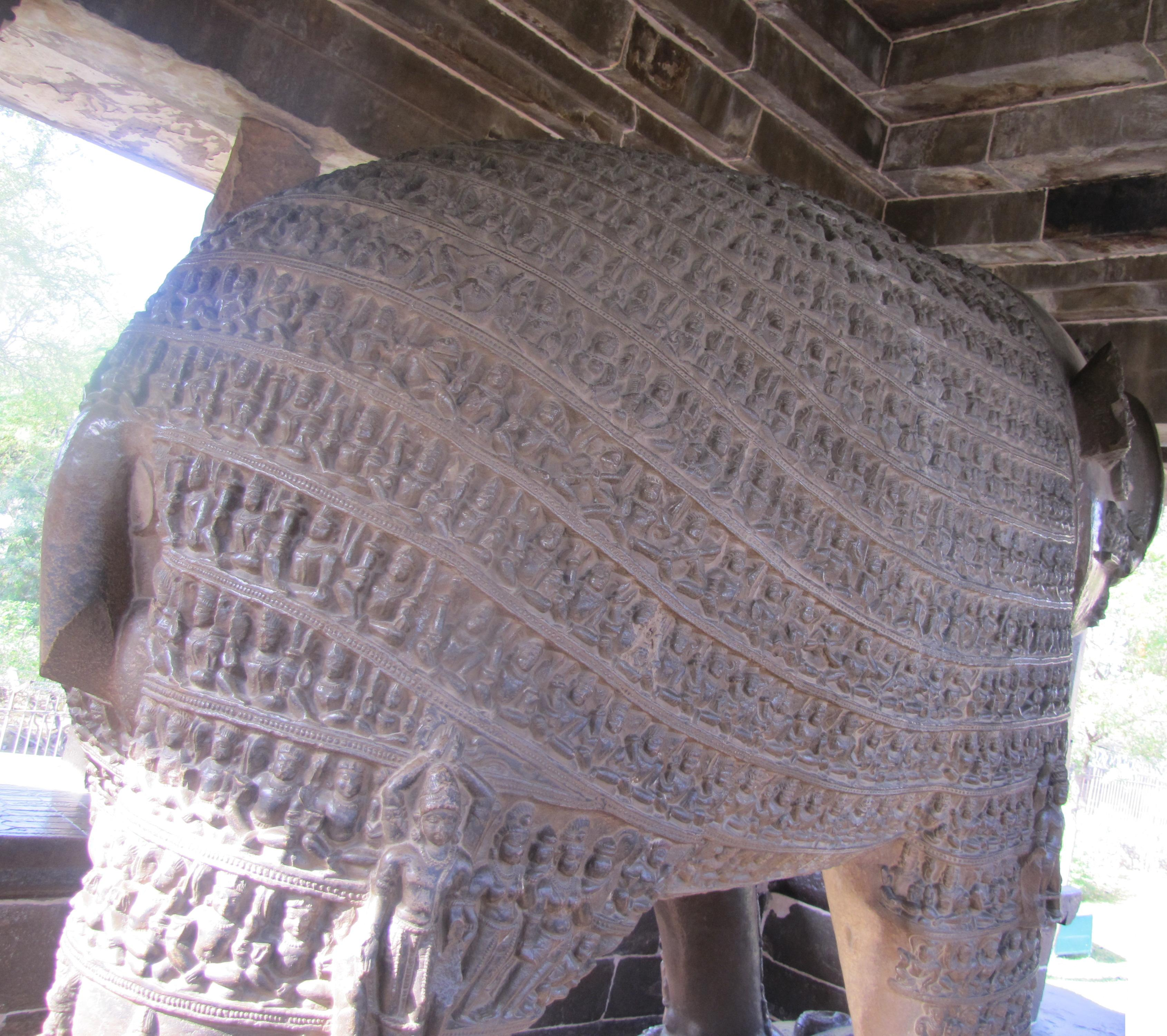
Varaha Temple, Khajuraho India.

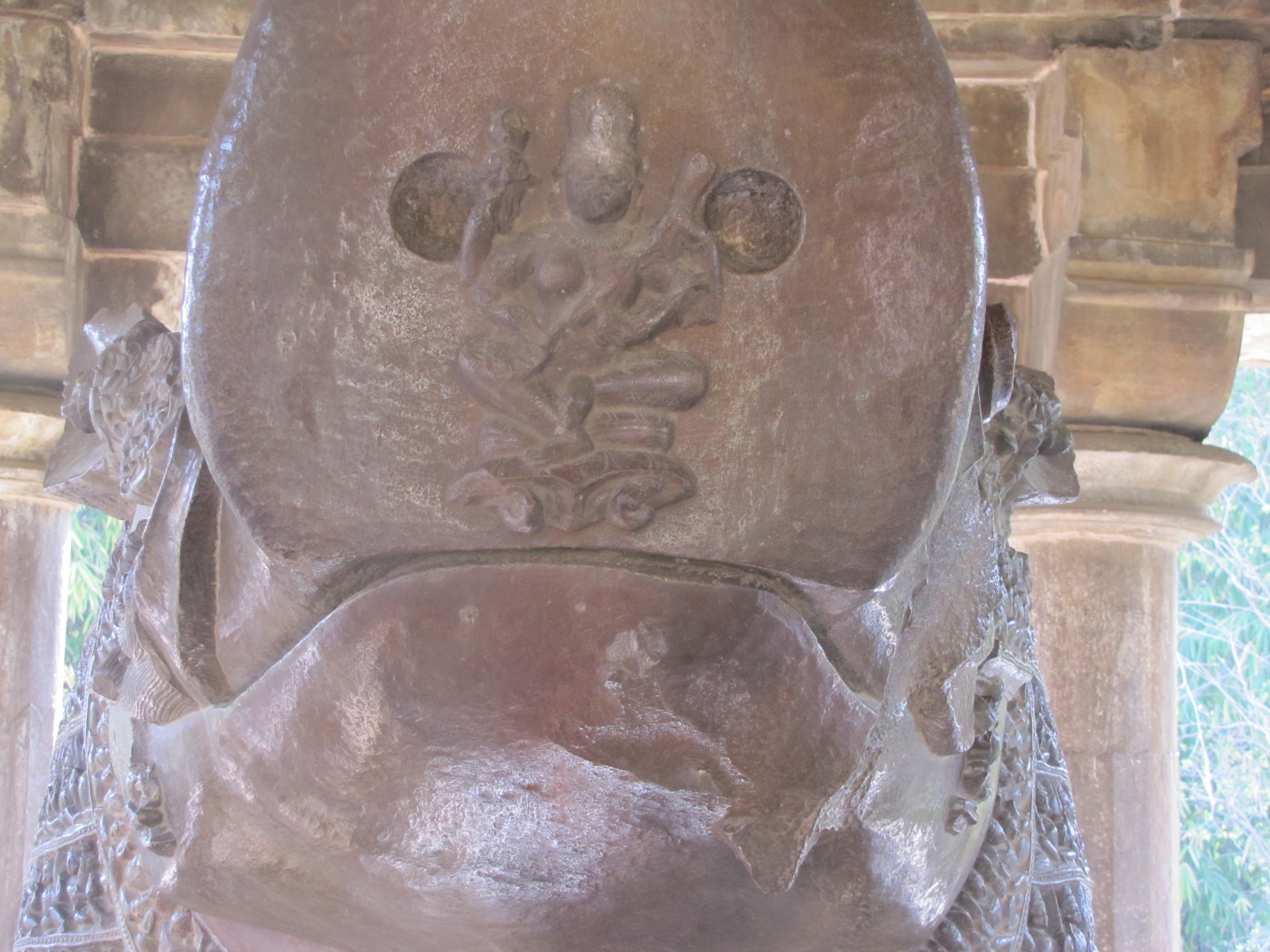
Varaha Temple, Khajuraho India.

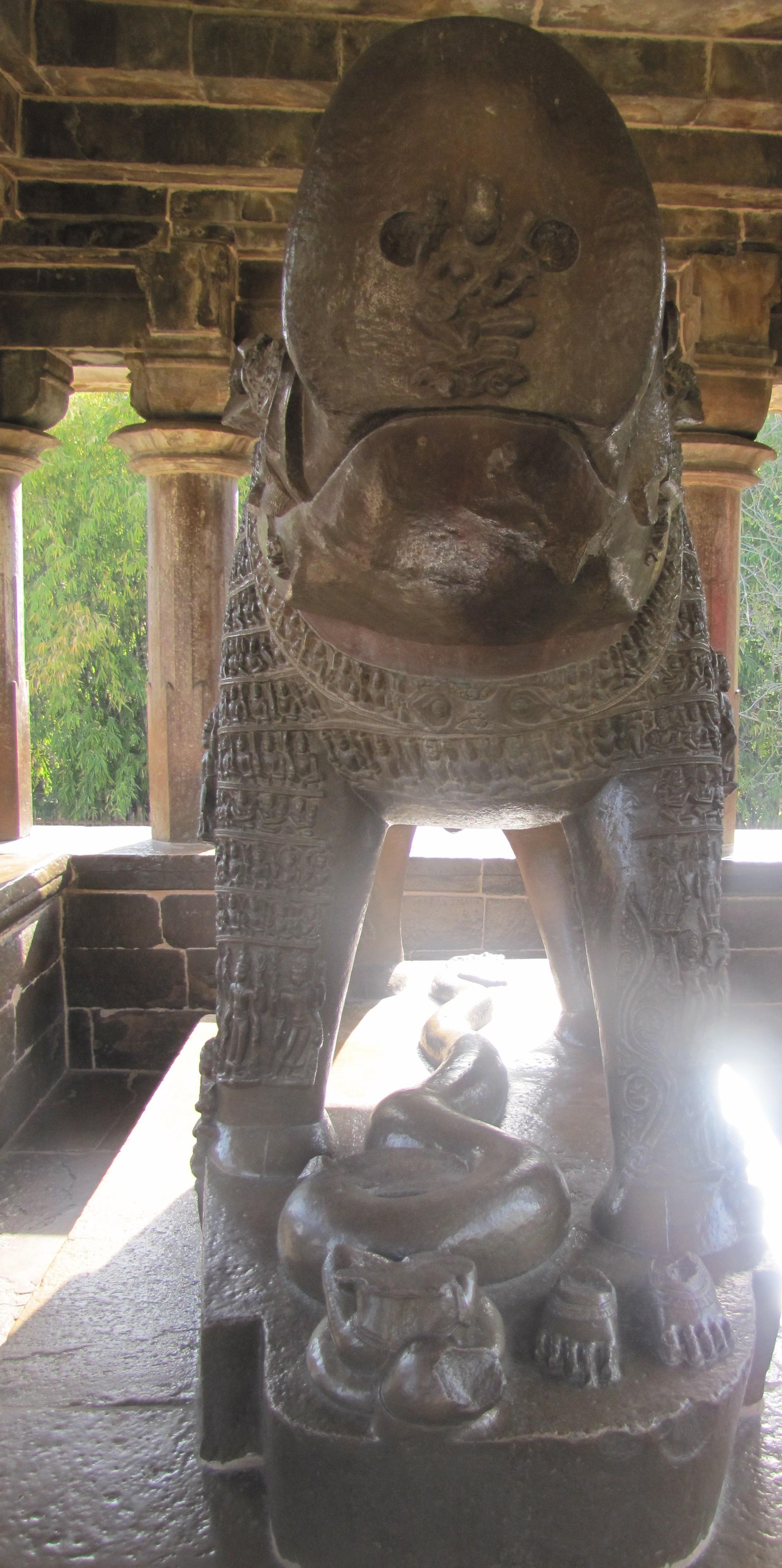
Varaha Temple, Khajuraho India.
