= Baraha Kalan =

Village in Madhya Pradesh, India

Coordinates: 23°03′N 78°34′E

Baraha kalan is a village in Udaipura tehsil of Raisen district in Madhya Pradesh, India. The primarily spoken language is Bundeli.
