= Mahishasuramardini Mandapa =

Mahishasuramardini Mandapa Mahishasuramardini Cave Temple
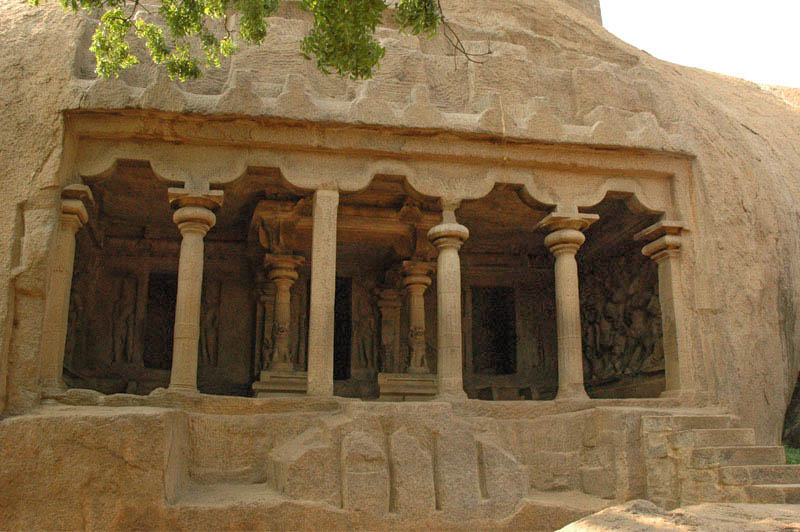
- Mahishamardini Rock Cut Mandapam

- Location within Tamil Nadu

Religion
- Affiliation: Hinduism
- District: Kancheepuram district
- Deity: Vishnu, Durga and Somaskanda

Location
- State: Tamil Nadu
- Country: India
- Coordinates: 12.6167°N 80.1917°E

Architecture
- Creator: Pallava dynasty
- Completed: Mid-7th century
- Temple: 1
- Inscriptions: Inscribed in 1984 under Asia-Pacific of UNESCO

Mahishasuramardhini Mandapa (Cave Temple; also known as Yampuri) is an example of Indian rock-cut architecture dating from the late 7th century, of the Pallava dynasty. It is a rock-cut cave temple located on a hill, near a lighthouse, along with other caves in Mamallapuram. Mamallapuram, also popularly known as Mahabalipuram, is a small village to the south of Chennai, in the state of Tamil Nadu, India. The temple is part of the Group of Monuments at Mahabalipuram, a UNESCO World Heritage Site inscribed in 1984. This Cave Temple has many interesting architectural features of which three exquisitely carved reliefs on the cave walls of three sanctums are prominent. One is of Vishnu reclining on the seven hooded serpent, Adishesha, another of Durga, the main deity of the cave temple Durga slaying the buffalo headed demon Mahishasura, and the third sanctum has a sculpture of Shiva.

== History ==
The cave is dated to the period of king Narasimhavarman Mahamalla (630–668 AD) of the Pallava dynasty, after whom the town is also named. The cave architecture is also said to be a continuation of the great religious themes that were carved in Western India. The cave reflects a transitional style of architecture in its columns mounted on seated lions and frescoes carved on the walls inside the cave which evolved during the rule of Pallava kings Mahendra Varman I and Rajasimha or Narasimhavarman I known as Mamalla. This style was continued by Mamalla's son Parameshvaravarman I. Historical research has also confirmed that Mahabalipuram town came to be established only after it was named after Mamalla and the caves and rathas are all attributed to his reign during the year 650 AD.

== Geography ==
Mahishasura Mardhini Cave or Mantapa is situated on the top of a hill range along with other caves in Mahabalipuram town, on the Coromandel Coast of the Bay of Bengal of the Indian Ocean. Now in the Kanchipuram district, it is approximately 58 kilometres (36 mi) from Chennai city (previously, Madras) and about 20 miles (32 km) from Chingelpet.

== Layout ==
The cave shrine faces east and has three chambers. Its internal dimensions are 32 feet (9.8 m) in length, 15 feet (4.6 m) in width, and 12.5 feet (3.8 m) in height. There is frontal projection of the main central chamber when compared to the two chambers which flank it. In the front façade of the cave are 10 horseshoe-shaped windows which are kudus on the cornice; these are unfinished carvings. The cornice also depicts carvings of five gable-roofed semi-complete shrines. The façade has four carved pillars and two pilasters at the ends, which are part of the façade and are carved in the traditional Pallava architectural style. The central chamber is fronted by a small mukhamandapa (entrance porch), which has two carved pillars with lion bases in the Pallava style.

== Architecture ==
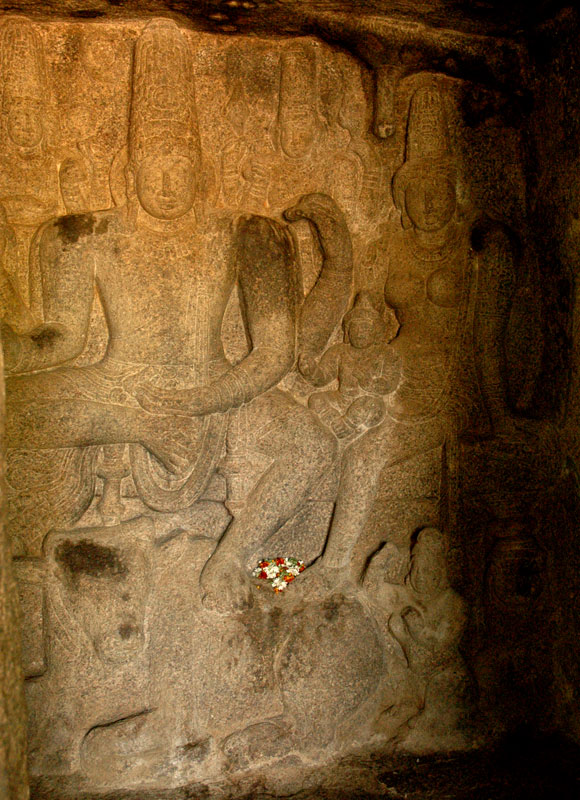
The Somaskhanda Panel of Shiva Parvati and their son Skanda

The mandapa is one of the most important caves in Mahabalipuram. It is dedicated to the goddess Mahishasuramardini, who is considered an incarnation of the goddess Durga. The mandapa is carved into the granite rock face of a hill. The verandah cut at the cave entrance, long and calumniated, has a composition of three chambers; the central chamber entrance depicts guardians (dwarapalas) on the flanks. The back wall of the central chamber features a carving of a Somaskanda panel; this panel is carved with images of Shiva and his consort Parvathi in their regal dress, each wearing a crown known as kirita-mukuta and other ornamentation, with their son Skanda seated between them. This panel also shows the carving of Nandi (bull), Shiva's mount (Vahana). Chandeshvara Nayanar, an ardent devotee of Shiva, is carved to the left of the carved images of the trinity gods Shiva, Brahma, and Vishnu, who are shown standing behind the main image of Shiva and Parvathi. The carving of the trinity gods gives the impression that they are pleased with the seated couple of Shiva, his consort and their son. In the individual depiction, Brahma is carved with four heads and four hands, with the upper hands holding a water vessel and akshamala; the lower right hand is shown raised in an appreciative gesture to Shiva, while the left hand is in a kataka mudra. Vishnu's carving is also depicted with four hands; chakra and shankha are held in his upper hands, with the lower left hand showing a gesture of appreciation to Shiva, and the lower right hand held up in a kataka mudra. The image of Surya (Sun) is carved on the top part of the panel, between Brahma and Vishnu. A separate Brahma panel carving appears on the back wall of the left chamber, while the right chamber is repeated with a panel of Shiva that, according to the opinion of archaeologists, wasoriginally meant to host a panel of Vishnu. Another interpretation mooted for the dominance of Shiva panels in this cave is that the religious leaning of the Kings who ruled at that time changed from Vaishnavism to Shavisim. Additionally, the Somaskanda panel in this cave is of a different architectural composition than similar panels carved in Dharmaraja Ratha, the Shore Temple, and the Atiranachanda Cave. Archeologists suggest the panel here was created during the reign of Rajasimha.

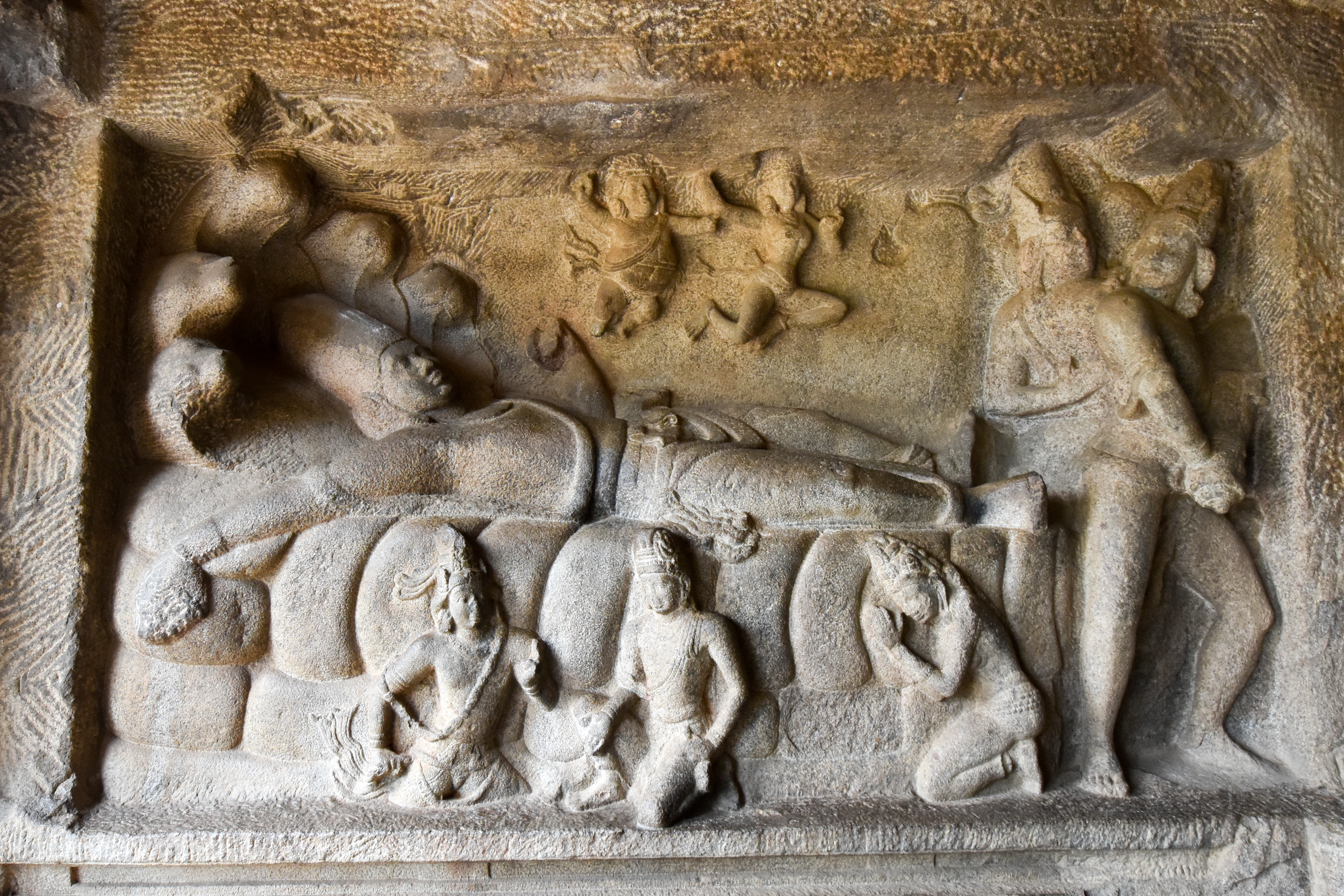
Front View of the Ananthashayani Pannel

On the southern face of the cave, there is a panel of Maha Vishnu in an Anantasayana mudra, (a reclining posture), lying on the bed of a serpent. He is shown with two hands, one is patting the coil of the Thousand-headed serpent known as Adisesha to pacify him, which forms a cover over Vishnu's head and the other hand with Lotus. Madhu-Kaitabha, the two demons, are carved near Vishnu's feet in an attacking mode, armed with a Gada (mace). The demons are in a position of retreat, as Adisesha hisses at them with flames emerging from its hoods attack the demons. Vishnu who is unconcerned, is patting Adisesha to pacify him. Also shown in the panel are the two ganas (dwarfs). The Dwarfs are Vishnu's ayudhapurushas (his personified weapons); the male gana is known as Shanka, and the female gana is Vishnu's gada. The other scene in the panel, is at its lower end, where three figures; his chakra (discus) in ayudha-purusha form, Khadga (Vishnu's sword) on the right and the female figure is Bhudevi. This carving explains the legend mentioned in the Bhagavata Purana, It states that during the creation, the asuras Madhu and Kaitabha stole the Vedas from Brahma, and deposited them deep inside the waters of the primeval ocean. Vishnu was the only god who could save the Vedas so they wanted to attack him, Sesha gets enraged and hisses flames at them emerging from its hoods and attacks the demons. Maha Vishnu Pacifies Sesha and takes the Hayagriva Avatharam. He killed the demons and retrieved the Vedas to Brahma. This led to Vishnu being offered the epithets Madhusudana - the killer of Madhu, and Kaitabhajit - the victor of Kaitabha. The bodies of Madhu and Kaitabha disintegrated into 2 times 6 — which is twelve pieces (two heads, two torsos, four arms and four legs). These are considered to represent the twelve seismic plates of the Earth.

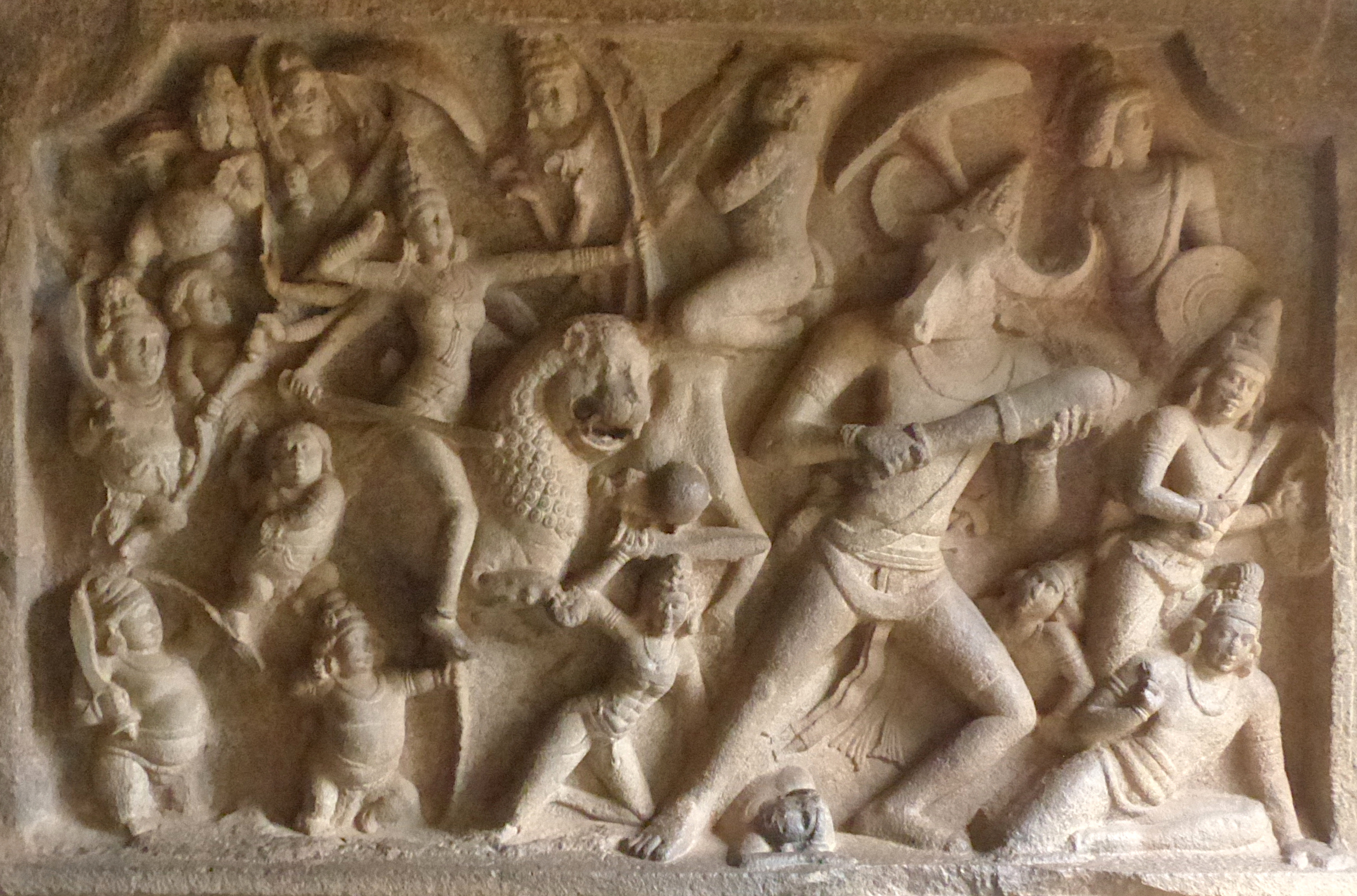
Mahishasura Mardini panel

The north wall in the cave contains a relief depicting the battle scene of the two adversaries, the supreme goddess Durga and the demon buffalo-headed Mahishasura. This panel symbolizes the triumph of good over evil. The carving is considered one of the best creations of the Pallava period. In the war scene, Durga appears with eight hands riding a fierce lion. She is holding a Sword, Dhanusha (Bow), bana (Arrows), Ghanta (Bell) in her four right hands; her four left hands display Pasha, Shankha, and Dagger. An attendant holds a chatra (parasol) over Durga's head. She is in the battlefield with her army of female warriors and ganas (dwarfs). She is shown attacking, with arrows, the demon Mahisha, causing him to retreat with his followers. Mahishasura is armed with a Gada (Club). Mahishasura's legend is told in the major texts of the Shaktism traditions known as the Devi Mahatmya, which is part of Markandeya Purana. The story of Mahishasura is told in the chapter where Markandeya is narrating the story of the birth of Savarnika Manu. Per the Markandeya Purana, the story of Mahishasura was narrated in the second Manvantara (approximately 1.3 billion years ago, as per the Vishnu Purana) by Maharishi Medha to a king named Soorut, as an incident which occurred in times ancient for even the 2nd Manvantara. Mahishasura is described as an evil being who can change his outer form, but never his demonic goals. According to Christopher Fuller, Mahishasura represents the forces of ignorance and chaos hidden by outer appearances. The symbolism is carried in Hindu art found in South Asia and South-East Asia (e.g., Javanese art), where Durga is shown as a serene, calm, collected and graceful symbol of good as she pierces the heart and kills the scared, overwhelmed and outwitted Mahishasura.
