= Vaikuntha Chaturmurti =

Four-headed aspect of Hindu god Vishnu

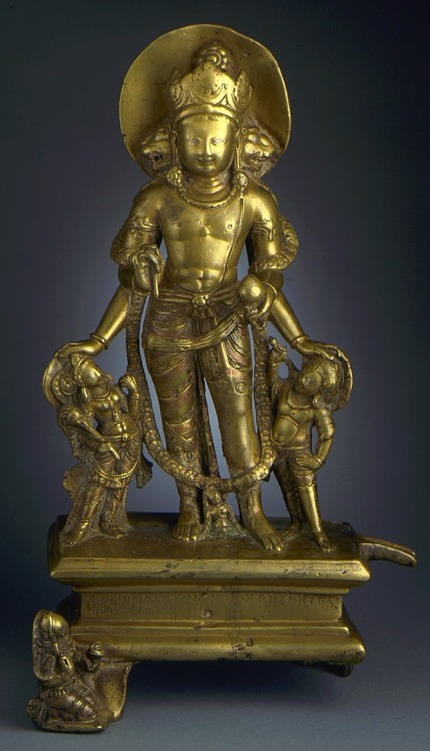
- Vaikuntha Chaturmukha, 9th century, Kashmir in Los Angeles County Museum of Art
- Affiliation: Form of Vishnu
- Mount: Garuda

Vaikuntha Chaturmurti or Vaikuntha Vishnu is a four-headed aspect of the Hindu god Vishnu, mostly found in Nepal and Kashmir (northern part of the Indian subcontinent). The icon represents Vishnu as the Supreme Being. He has a human head, a lion head, a boar head and a fierce head. Sometimes, even three-headed but aspects of Vishnu where the fierce rear head is dropped are considered to represent Vaikuntha Chaturmurti. Though iconographical treatises describe him to eight-armed, he is often depicted with four. Generally, Vaikuntha Chaturmurti is shown standing but sometimes he is depicted seated on his vahana (mount) Garuda.

The concept of a four-headed Vishnu first appears in the Hindu epic Mahabharata, but the complete iconography was first found in a 5th-century Pancharatra text. The icon reflects influences from the Gupta period and the Gandhara architectural tradition. While as per one interpretation, the animal heads represent Vishnu's avatar Narasimha (lion-headed man) and Varaha (boar), another theory based on Pancharatra texts relates the four heads to the Chaturvyuha: Vasudeva (Krishna), Samkarshana (Balarama), Pradyumna and Aniruddha – four vyuhas (manifestations) of Vishnu. A cult centered on Vaikuntha Chaturmurti developed in Kashmir in the 8–12th century, when the deity also enjoyed royal patronage in the region. The Lakshmana Temple of Khajuraho suggests his worship in the Chandela kingdom (Central India) in the 10th century.

== Names ==
The icon is known by various names: Vaikuntha, Vaikunthanatha ("Lord of Vaikuntha"), Chaturmurti ("four-fold representation"), Chaturanana ("four-faced"), Para Vasudeva Narayana, Vishnu Chaturmurti, Vishnu Chaturanana and Vaikuntha Chaturmukhi ("four-faced Vaikuntha"). The Vishnudharmottara Purana calls him Vishnu-Vaikuntha. The icon may be called Chaturvyuha ("having four vyuhas"), when identified with the four manifestations or vyuhas of Vishnu.

Vaikuntha generally refers to Vishnu's abode, but in the Mahabharata and the Puranas, this term is also used as an epithet of Vishnu. Though no clear etymology of vaikuntha exists, the term is believed to be derived from vi-kuntha, literally meaning "not blunt". The earliest scriptures like the Vedas, Upanishads and Brahmanas connect the epithet to Indra, the king of the gods and the Supreme god of the era. By the time of the Mahabharata, Vishnu gained the role of Indra and the epithet vaikuntha was transferred to him. The use of vaikuntha in the name also suggests that the form represents the Para (Ultimate Reality) form of Vishnu.

The name Chaturmurti also appears in the Vishnu sahasranama (thousand names of Vishnu).

== Iconography ==
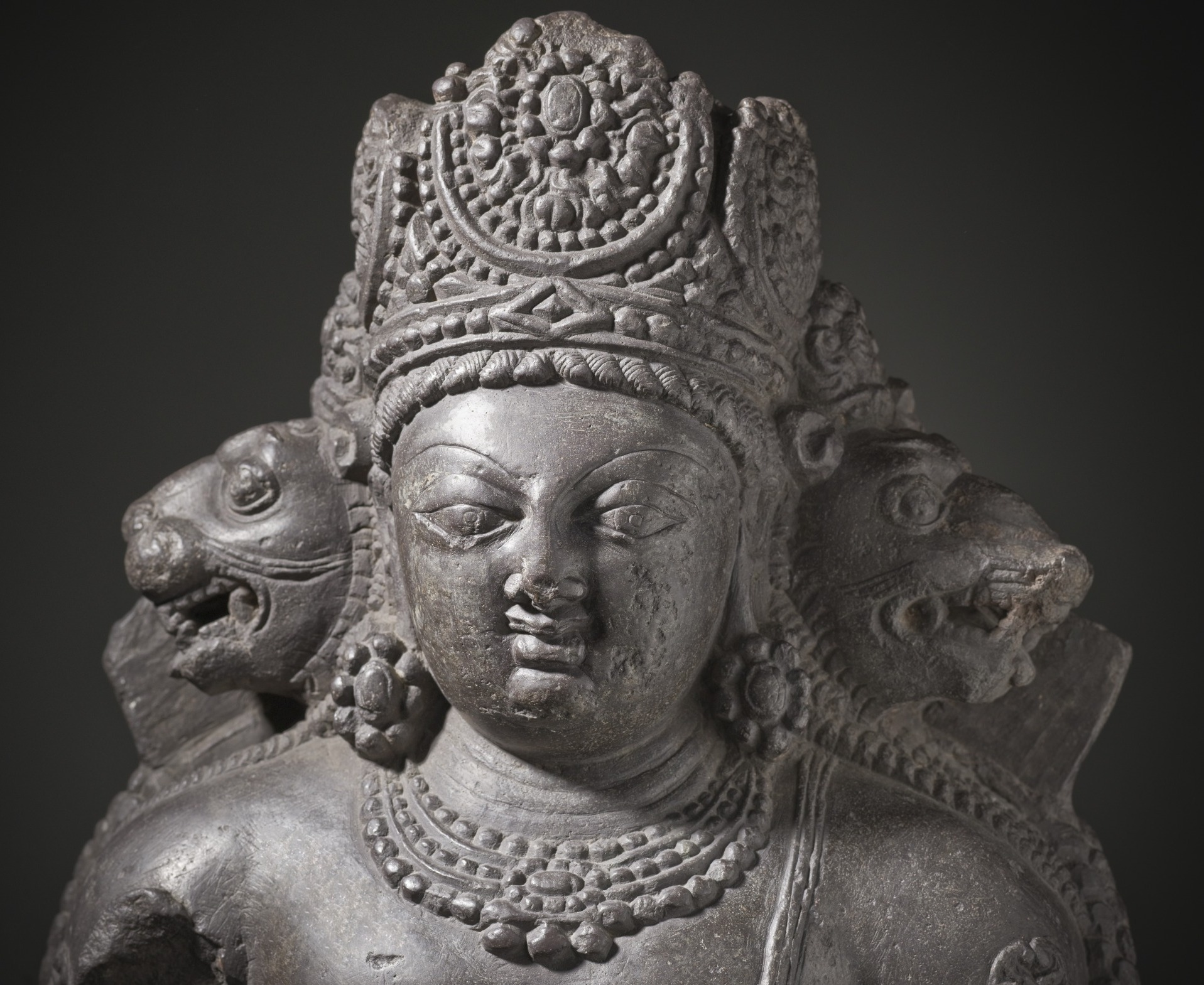
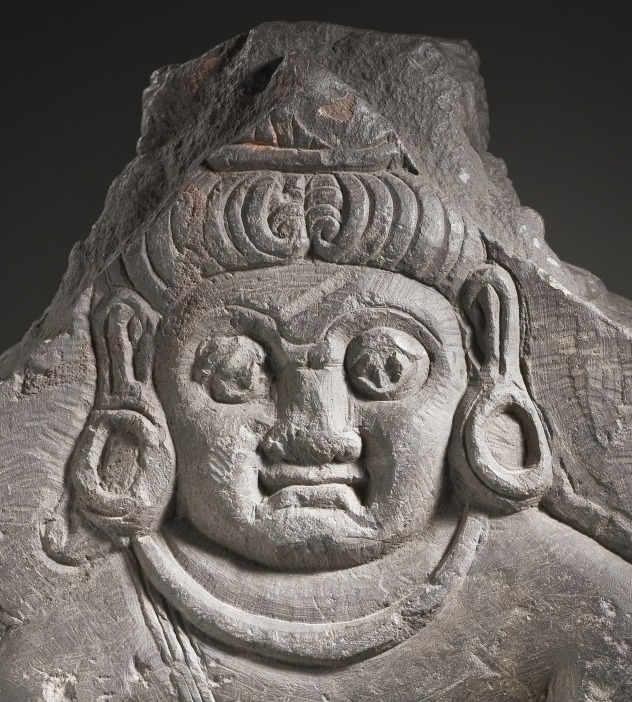
(left) The three front faces: (from left) lion, human and boar and (right) the demonic face

The Pancharatra text Jayakhya-Samhita mentions that Vaikuntha Chaturmurti has four faces: Vaikuntha, Narasimha, Varaha and Kapila and four arms holding the usual attributes of Vishnu: shankha (conch), chakra, gada (mace) and padma (lotus). In the Vishnudharmottara Purana, Vaikuntha Chaturmurti is described as having eight arms and four faces, human (nara – human or saumya – mild or purusha – man) facing the East (front), lion (Narasimha – the lion-headed avatar of Vishnu) on the South (his right head, left), boar (Varaha – the boar avatar of Vishnu) on the North (his left head, right) and demonic (kapila or raudra – fierce/wrathful or rakshasa – demon) facing the west (rear).

In one of earliest Vaikuntha Chaturmurti images dating from the Gupta era – c. 6th century (now housed in Mathura Museum), the positions of the boar and lion heads are reversed, though this is a rare aberration. The central front face may be smiling. Sometimes, the back face may be omitted. The fourth head may be replaced by a horse (Hayagriva, another avatar of Vishnu) or a Chakrapurusha (the personified Sudarshana Chakra – the discus weapon of Vishnu). The kapila head may have a moustache, bulging large eyes, a third eye, grinning teeth, fangs, a short chin, broad eyebrows and a ferocious, grim or sad expression. His hair are generally tied up in a large knot – a jata (matted hair) like a sage; rarely he may wear a crown.

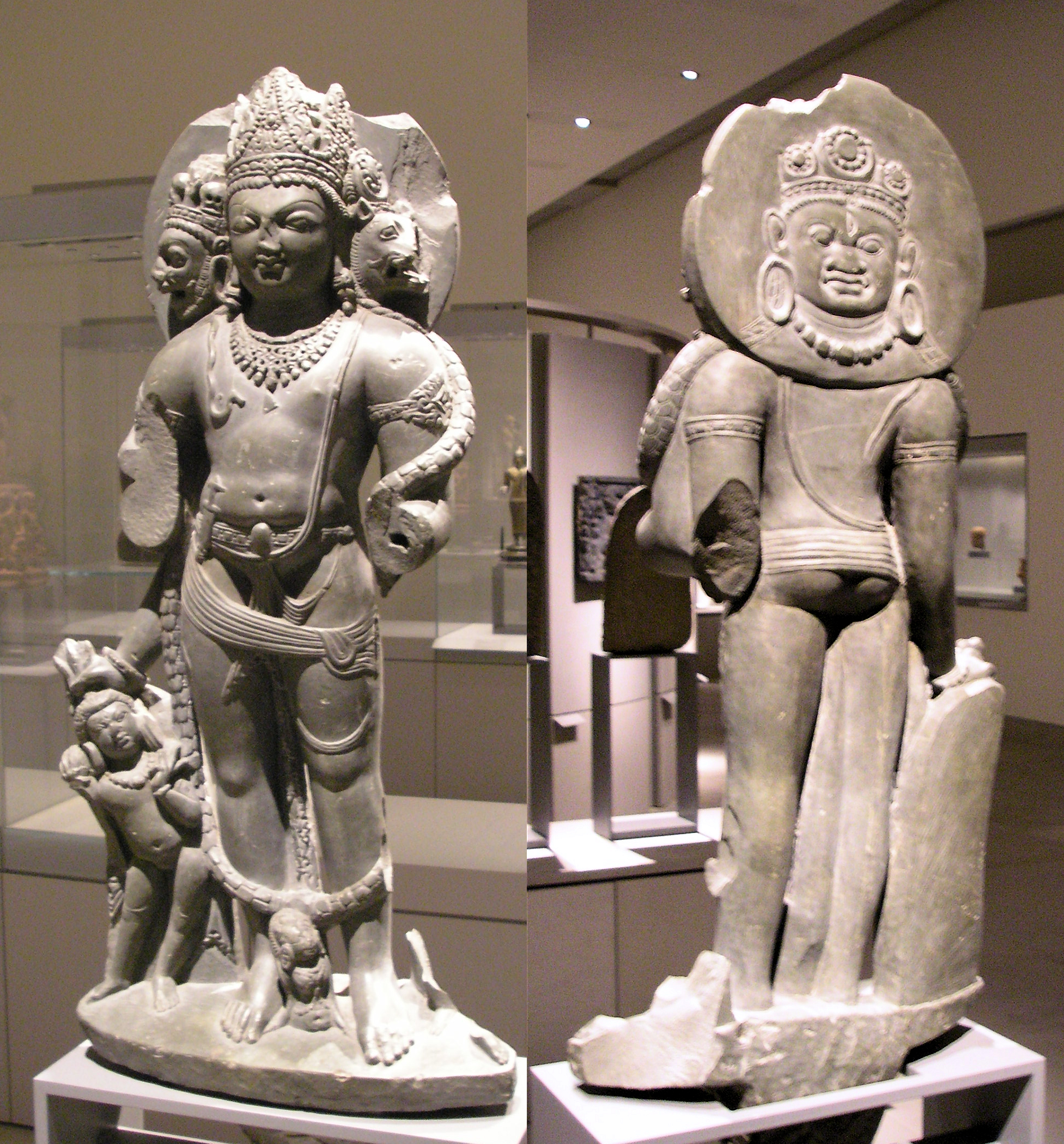
Four-armed, four-headed Vishnu Vaikuntha Chaturmurti, Kashmir, 9th century CE

The name of the fourth head as Kapila is interpreted in two ways. Taking the literal meaning of kapila as red, it is interpreted as meaning fierce or angry. The epithet kapila is associated with the fire god Agni and the solar deity Surya in early canonical texts. Another theory relates to Vishnu's sage avatar and founder of Samkhya philosophy, Kapila, who is described as having a wrathful nature and cursing the sons of Sagara to turn into ashes for insulting him. The head-dress jatajuta is typical of Brahmin sages like Kapila. The Agni Purana also describes the icon having four heads, without describing the nature of each. The iconographical treatises Aparajitapriccha and the Rupamandana mention that the fourth head is Shri (Lakshmi – the wife of Vishnu) and Stri (female) respectively, however no sculptures with a fourth female head have been discovered. The back face may be carved on the halo behind the central three heads in low relief or in a space between the halo.

In the iconography of Kashmir, during the 8th and 9th centuries, the gods of Hindu Trimurti – Brahma, Vishnu and Shiva – each are depicted with three heads. In a sculpture displayed in the Metropolitan Museum of Art in New York, the four-headed Brahma as well as Shiva are shown with three visible heads. Vishnu is depicted as Vaikuntha Chaturmurti in this configuration, with three visible heads.

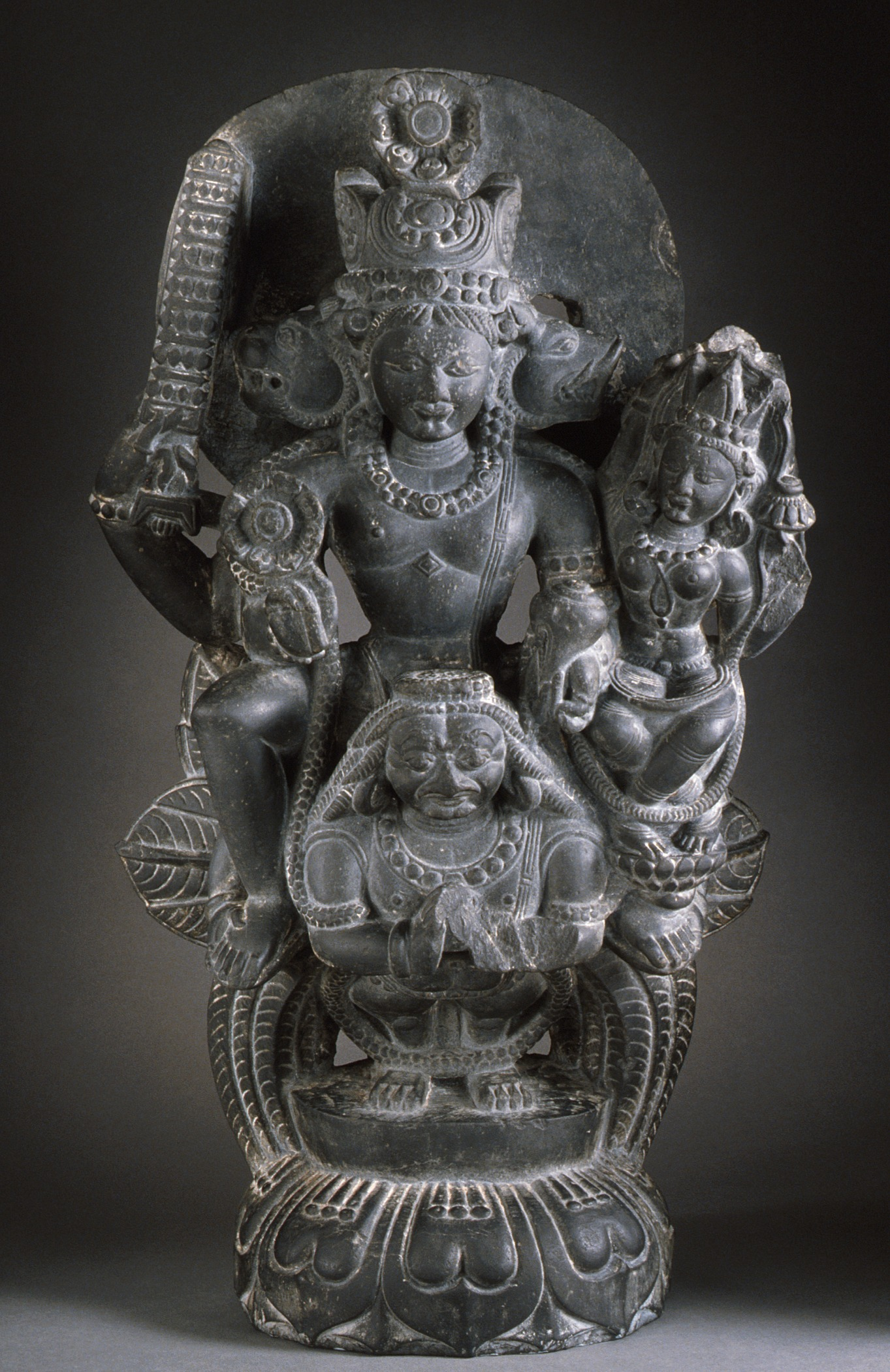
Lakshmi-Vaikuntha riding his vehicle (vahana) Garuda, 11th century Kashmir

Vaikuntha Chaturmurti is generally depicted standing. He wears rich clothes (generally in sculpture, only a dhoti) as well as various ornaments like a crown, armbands, necklaces etc., symbolic of royalty and the yagnopavita (sacred thread). In his eight arms, he is prescribed in the texts to carry gada (mace), sword, arrow and the Sudarshana Chakra in his left hands and shankha (conch), shield, bow and lotus in his right hands. However, in sculpture, he is often four-armed and in two of his hands, he holds a lotus and a conch, while his other hands rest on the heads of his personified weapons (ayudhapurusha) – Gadadevi or Gadanari (gada as a female) on his right and Chakrapurusha on his left, who stand as small figures besides his legs. They both look upwards towards him and hold fly whisks. A tiny figurine of the earth goddess Prithvi (who associated with Varaha and Vishnu as his consort) rises from the pedestal in between his feet, as though supporting the deity. A short dagger or sword may be tucked up in the waist belt of the god near the right hip, a peculiar feature of Kashmir icons. Attendants or devotees may be also shown besides or below Vishnu. Sometimes, Brahma and Shiva and the ten avatars of Vishnu may be depicted in the background.

As prescribed in the Jayakhya-Samhita, Vaikuntha Chaturmurti may be depicted as riding his vehicle (vahana) Garuda too, though these images are rarer. In this configuration, the god holds a sword, a lotus, a mace or a conch and the chakra. Generally, on four feathers of Garuda sit four female figures, two on either side of Vaikuntha Chaturmurti. The identity of the female figures is uncertain. They are interpreted as two goddesses (possibly consorts of Vishnu – Lakshmi and Bhumi) and two female attendants. The Jayakhya-Samhita mentions that four goddesses Lakshmi, Kirti, Jaya and Maya as the female counterparts of Vaikuntha Chaturmurti. Rarely, Vaikuntha Chaturmurti is accompanied with his consort Lakshmi, who sits on his left thigh. This form is called Lakshmi Vaikuntha in the Jayakhya-Samhita.

In rare instances, true to the textual descriptions, Vaikuntha Chaturmurti is depicted as eight-armed. Examples of these exist in Kandariya Mahadeva Temple, Khajuraho; Siddhanatha Mahadeva Temple, Sandera, Gujarat and Jhalawar Museum. A ten-armed Vaikuntha Chaturmurti is found at Sasbahu temple, Nagda. A twelve armed Vaikuntha image is categorized as a different form called Ananta by iconographical treatises; an illustration of the same is found at Lakshana Devi temple, Brahmaur, Chamba. This form is also identified with the Vishvarupa form of Vishnu. Another variant of Vaikuntha image is sixteen-armed and is called Trailokyamohana.

There are some sculptures that synthesize Vaikuntha form with other forms of Vishnu. An 1170 CE sculpture at Chamba depicts Seshasayi Vishnu (Vishnu reclining on the serpent Shesha) with the three heads of Vaikuntha form. Another sculpture in Markula Devi Temple, Udaipur combines Trivikrama (another avatar of Vishnu) with Vaikuntha's three heads.

== Development and symbolism ==
Vaikuntha Chaturmurti in Mathura
5th century CE

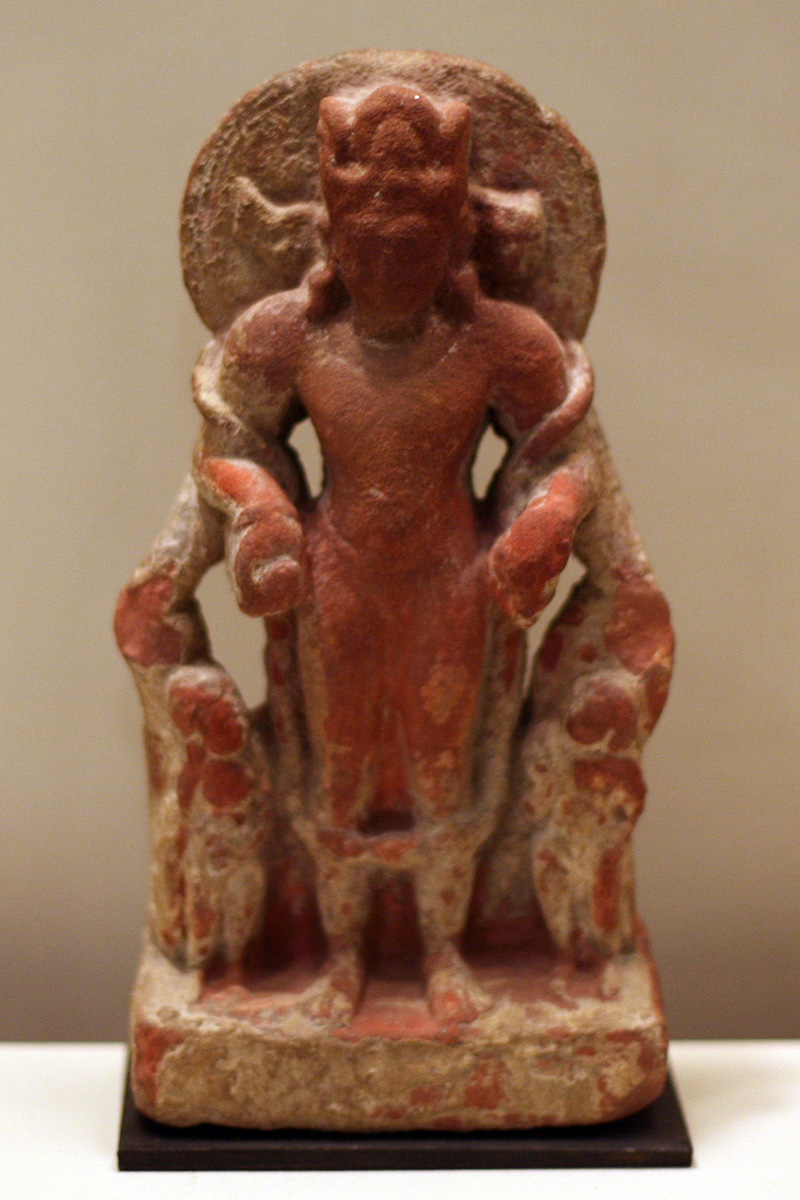
Full figure of four-armed, three-faced Vishnu. 5th century CE. Brooklyn Museum.

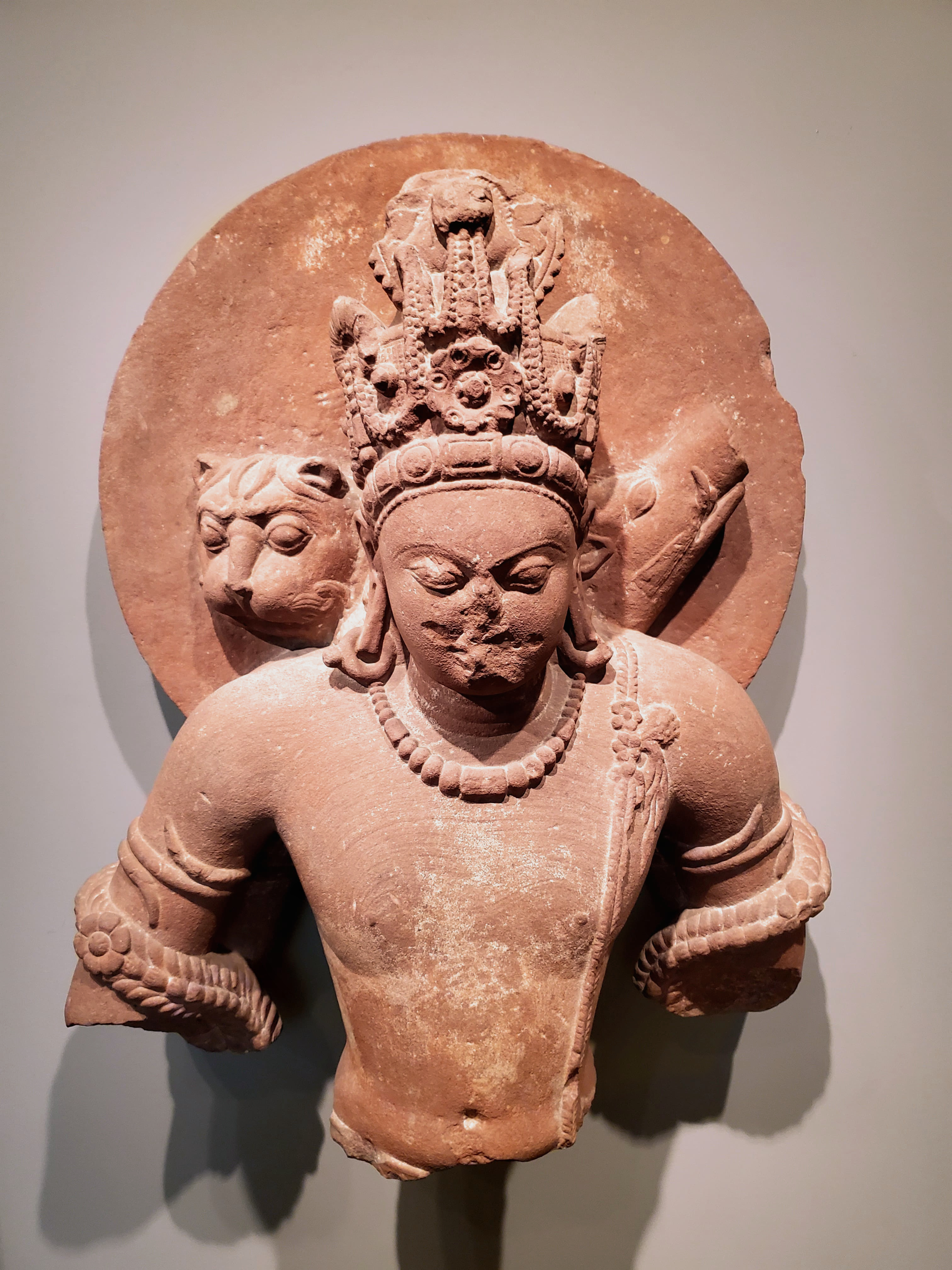
Fragment of a statue of Vishnu with the three faces, mid-5th century. Museum of Fine Arts, Boston.

The God Vishnu in three incarnations (Chaturvyuha): Vishnu himself or Krishna in human form, Varaha as a boar, Narasimha as a lion. Art of Mathura, Gupta period.

Vaikuntha Chaturmurti first appears in the Mahabharata, where he is known as Murtichatushtaya. Besides the four faces, no details of his iconography are found though. The Jayakhya-Samhita, generally dated to the Gupta period (c. 5th century CE), is the first iconographical reference to Vaikuntha Chaturmurti.

Though three-faced Vishnu images from the Mathura school exist from the Gupta period, not a single four-faced Vaikuntha Chaturmurti from this era has been found until this day. It is suggested by scholars that the three-faced Vishnu images should be considered as Vaikuntha Chaturmurti too, where the fourth head was dropped by sculptors just for sake of convenience. An alternate theory dates Jayakhya-Samhita to c. 600–850 CE and suggests that the three-faced Vishnu images of Gupta era as well as Gupta icons of Vishvarupa (another form of Vishnu) inspired the iconography of the Vaikuntha Chaturmurti, which developed in Kashmir in the 8th century and attached the fourth head on the back of the older icon of a three-faced Vishnu. Though popular in Kashmir, the four-headed icon is rarely seen outside of it.

The iconography of Vaikuntha Chaturmurti was influenced by Gandhara architectural tradition, which impacted the iconographic depictions of sculptures of Northwest India, particularly those made in Kashmir. Keeping with the Gandhara style, the body and legs are depicted as strong and sturdy. The muscular body is considered to be inflated with prana (life-breath), an Indian concept. The bow arched eyebrows and lotus shaped eyes are also characteristic of the Indian school of sculpture. The presence of the earth goddess at the feet also reflects Central Asian influence. The ayudhapurushas in the icon may be inspired by those in the Vishnu iconography of Gupta art. They and the earth goddess are also part of traditional Vishnu iconography, even when he is depicted as one-headed.

The central Vishnu head and side heads of Varaha and Narasimha may be influenced by other configurations in architecture. For example, Vishnu, Varaha and Narasimha may be depicted on back (western) and side (northern/southern) walls of temples. Varaha (rescues the earth from the cosmic waters at the beginning of an eon), Vishnu (as a human) and Narasimha (destroying a demon) may represent creation, preservation and destruction – the three functions in the Hindu universe. Vaikuntha Chaturmurti represents Vishnu as the Supreme Being, Creator of the Universe. Also, Varaha and Narasimha are oldest in antiquity (avatars Matsya and Kurma which are described in sacred texts to be appearing before Varaha and Narasimha were associated with Vishnu at a later date). Their presence in the iconography of Vaikuntha Chaturmurti suggests that this form originated in the Gupta era, where their cults were at their peak.

Many writers associate the boar and lion heads to the avatars Varaha and Narasimha, others associate with the Chaturvyuhas, however the latter is heavily disputed. The Vishnudharmottara Purana describes the Chaturvyuhas – Vasudeva (Krishna), Samkarshana (Balarama), Pradyumna, Aniruddha – four manifestations of Vishnu. Though the text does not explicitly equate the two forms. Many modern indologists as well as Pancharatra followers associate both of them based on the association of Chaturvyuhas with gunas (qualities) in the Vishnudharmottara Purana and the Pancharatra texts. The gunas are in turn associated with Vaikuntha Chaturmurti. The human face is Vasudeva, who symbolizes strength/power (bala); the lion is Samkarshana, who is knowledge/wisdom (jnana) personified; the demonic form is Pradyumna, who is prosperity/sovereignty (aishvarya) and the boar is Aniruddha, the Lord of energy (shakti).

== Worship ==
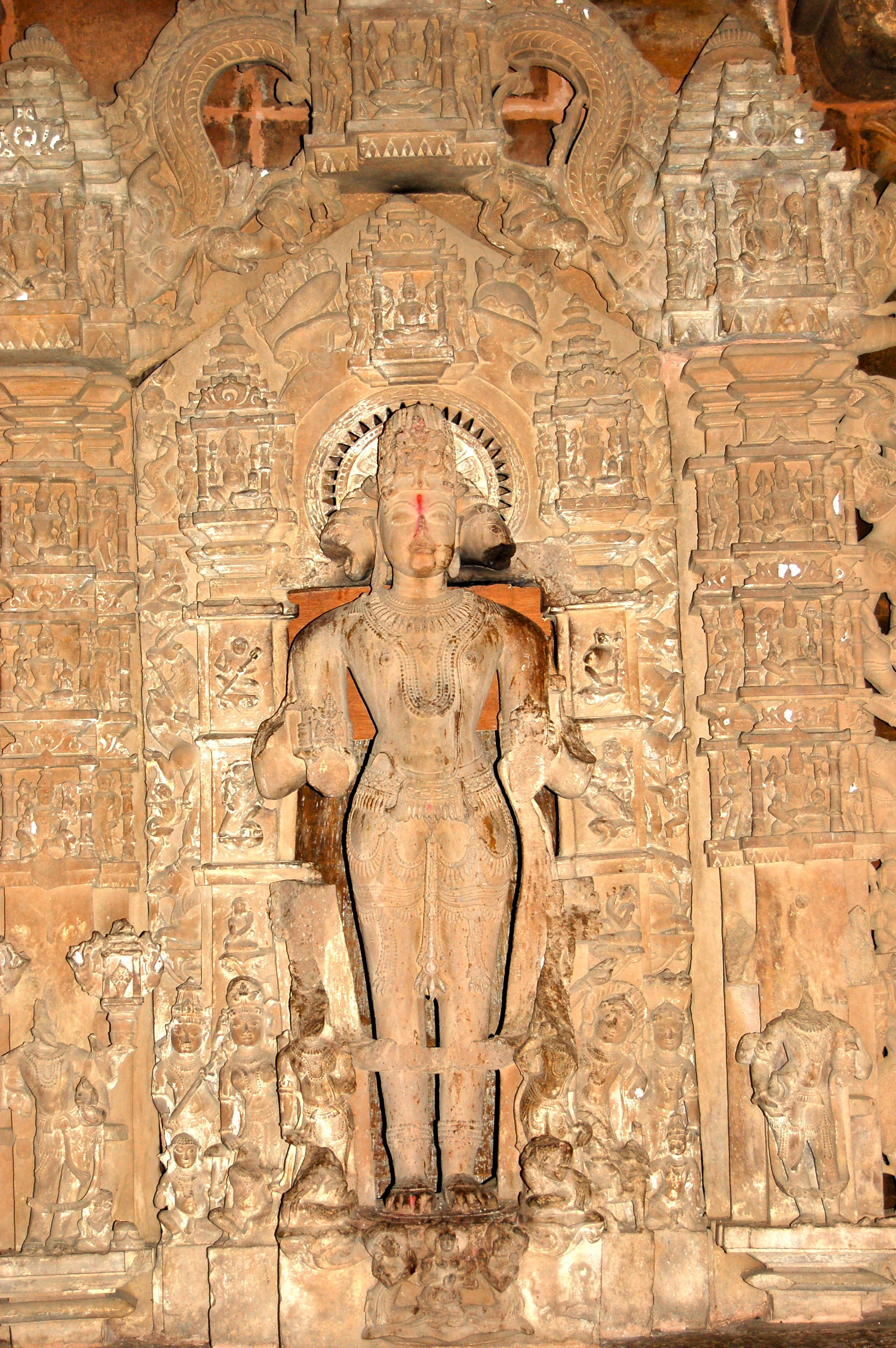
Vaikuntha Chaturmurti as the central icon in Lakshmana Temple, Khajuraho

The presence of Vaikuntha Chaturmurti found in Kashmir and north West India predating 10th century suggests the worship of Vishnu in this form in the era. The form developed a cult between 8th to 10th century CE. The 12th century chronicle Rajatarangini also mentions about the installation of this form of Vishnu. The icon received royal patronage from King Avantivarman, the founder of Utpala dynasty (reign: 855–883 CE); temples built in his reign often depict Vaikuntha Chaturmurti. Vaikuntha Chaturmurti became the tutelary deity of the Karkotas and Utpala dynasties of Kashmir. It was also popular in the regions adjoining Kashmir.

The Lakshmana Temple of Khajuraho is dedicated to Vaikuntha Chaturmurti. Though three-faced, an inscription in the temple suggests that it should be considered four-faced. It also records a legend where Kapila and other demons conjoined together in a single form and were blessed by Brahma that only someone in the same form could slay them so Vishnu took the form of Vaikuntha Chaturmurti. The presence of the Lakshamana Temple in Khajuraho suggests worship in the Chandela kingdom in the 10th century.

The Trailokyamohana form of Vishnu was worshipped in Gujarat between 12th to 15th century CE.
