= Nandaka =

Sword of the Hindu god Vishnu

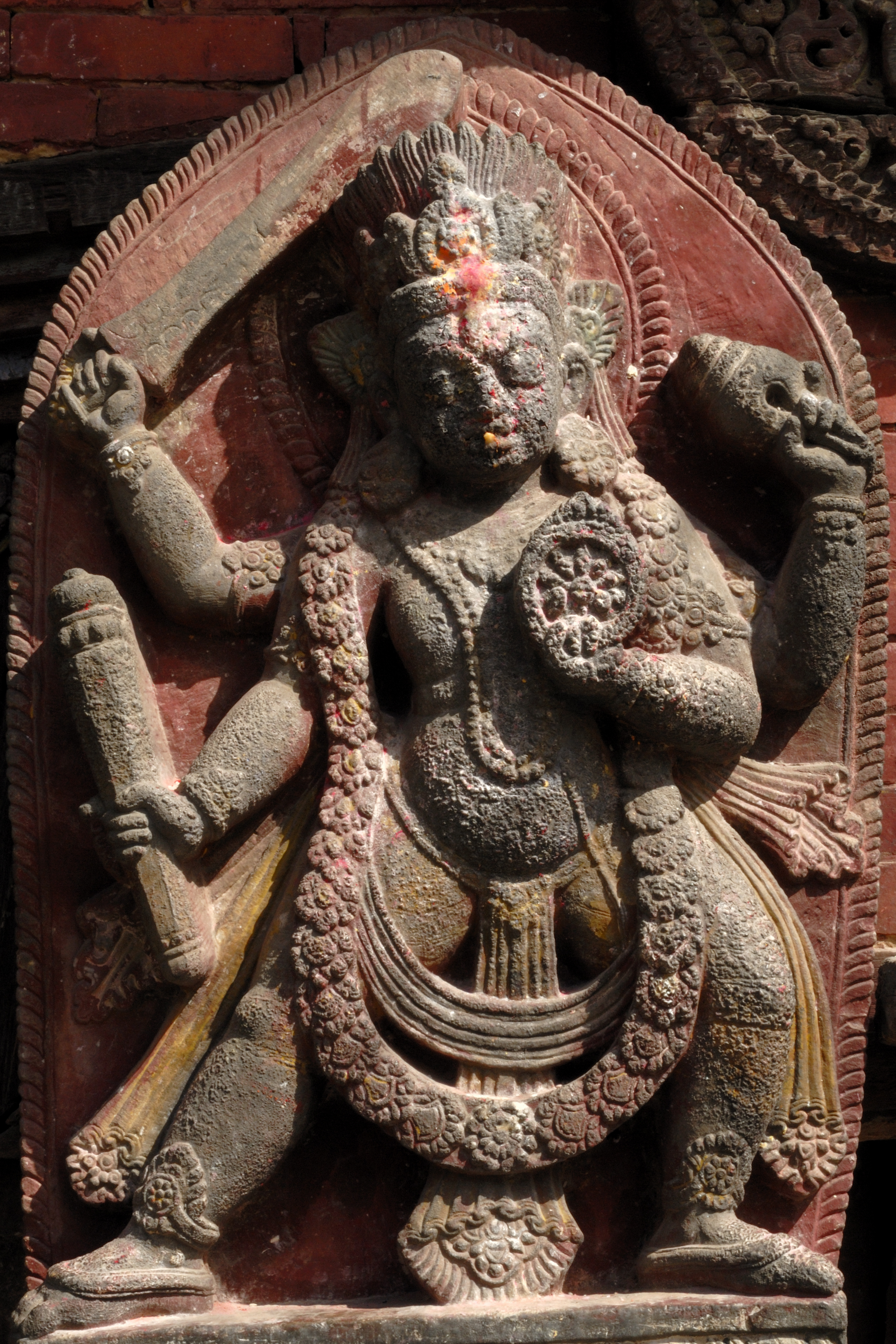
Sculpture of Vishnu wielding the Nandaka

Nandaka (Sanskrit: नन्दक, lit. 'source of joy') or Nandaki is the sword of the Hindu god Vishnu. Nandaka is generally depicted in images where Vishnu is represented with more than his usual four arms. The sword is compared to knowledge in Hindu scriptures.

In Sri Vaishnavism (a major Vaishnava tradition), the saints Annamacharya and Peyalvar are considered to be the avatars of Nandaka.

== Legend ==
According to the Agni Purana, the creator-god Brahma was performing a sacrifice on Mount Meru. The hundred-armed asura Loha obstructed the same. Vishnu manifested before Brahma from the sacrificial fire. Vishnu seized the sword called Nandaka from the asura and unsheathed it. The sword is described as blue-hued with a gem-studded handle. Wielding his mace, the asura drove several heavenly beings from the mountain. Vishnu slew the asura with the sword; the severed parts of the asura's body fell on earth and turned into iron due to their contact with Nandaka. Vishnu blessed the asura that his fallen body-parts will be employed for the manufacture of weapons on earth.

== Literature ==
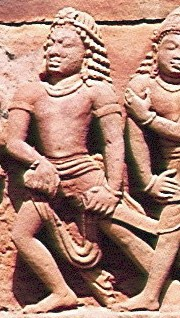
Nandaka personified as a youth with a sword.

Vishnu is usually depicted as four-armed with the four attributes in his hands: the shankha (conch), the Sudarshana Chakra, the padma (lotus) and the Kaumodaki gada (mace). In eight- or sixteen-armed depictions of the deity, he may be shown holding a sword. The sword appears very rarely in the depictions of Vishnu. It appears in Vishnu iconography as late as the Gupta era (320–550).

Nandaka is mentioned as the sword of Vishnu's avatar Rama in the Hindu epic Ramayana. The Harivamsa as well as the Brihatbrahma Samhita prescribe that the sword be shown in Vishnu's four-armed images. The Sattvata Samhita recommends that it be shown in a right hand of a six-armed Vishnu and in a left hand in a ten-armed Vishnu. Vishnu's avatar Vamana is described to hold the Nandaka in his right hand in the Kalika Purana. An 11th-century image shows the sword tied to his belt.

The Vishnu Sahasranama, which lists the 1000 epithets of Vishnu, mentions Nandaka twice. In a mantra, Vishnu is praised as the holder of the shankha, Nandaka, and the chakra. The 994th name of Vishnu is "Nandaki", the one who wields the Nandaka.

In a rare depiction in the Sheshashayi Vishnu panel of the Gupta temple at Deogarh, Nandaka is depicted anthropomorphically as a young man holding a sword (see Ayudhapurusha). He is depicted leading the other personified weapons of Vishnu against the demons Madhu and Kaitabha. Nandaka is also depicted as an ayudhapurusha in the scene of Madhu and Kaitabha in the Mahishasuramardini mandapa, Mahabalipuram.

== Symbolism ==
The Vishnu Purana says that Nandaka, "the pure sword", represents jnana (knowledge), which is created from vidya (translated variously as wisdom, knowledge, science, learning, scholarship, philosophy), its sheath is avidya (ignorance or illusion). The Varaha Purana describes it as the destroyer of ignorance.

The Krishna Upanishad equates the sword to the destroyer god Shiva. It says that the 'Great God' (Maheshvara, an epithet of Shiva) takes the form of a flaming sword of knowledge, one that destroys ignorance.
