= Ayudhapurusha =

Personified divine weapons in Hindu art

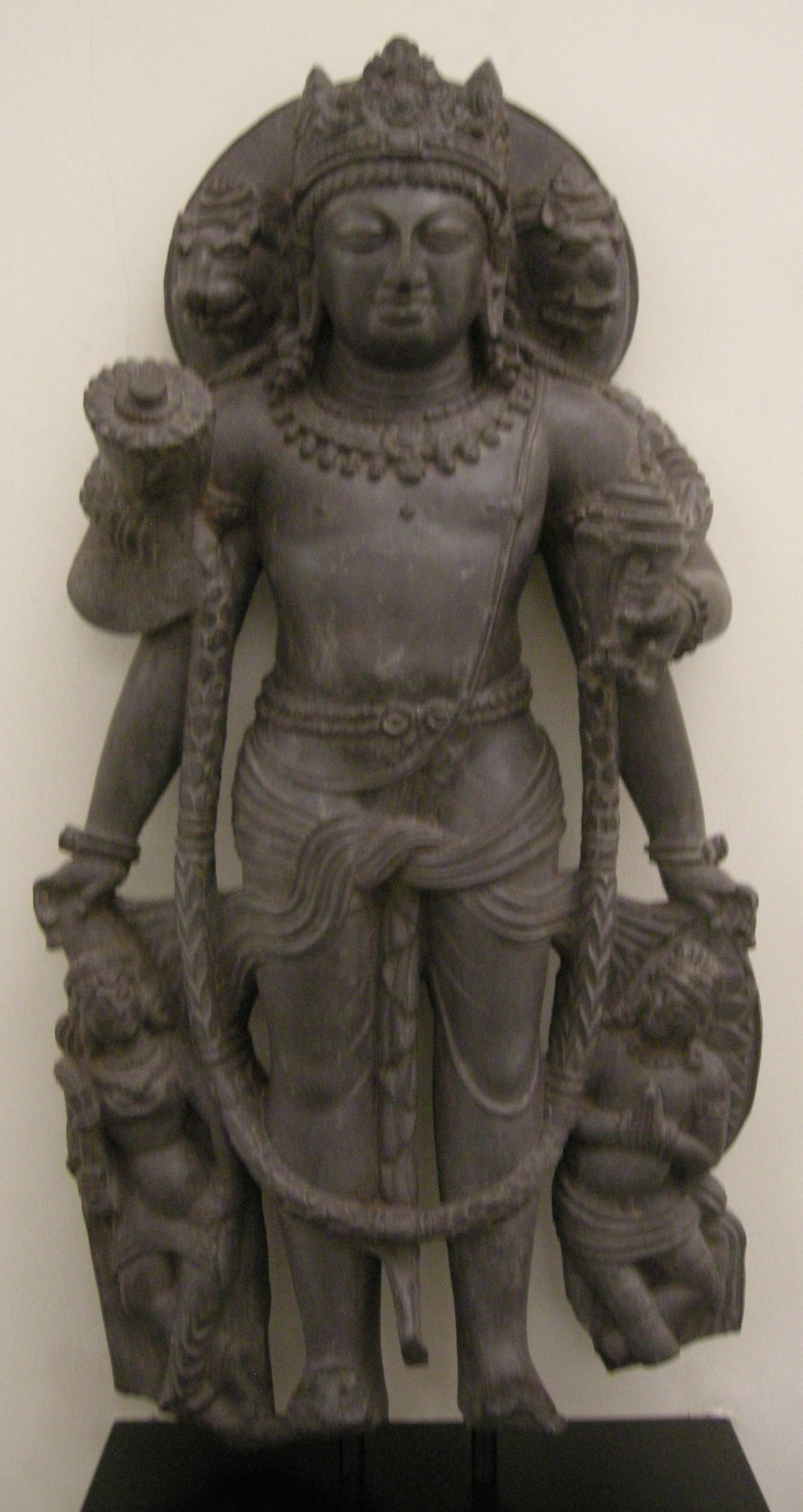
Vishnu's Vaikuntha Chaturmukha form holding Gadadevi (right hand) and Chakrapurusha in his hands.

Ayudhapurusha is the anthropomorphic depiction of a divine weapon in Hindu art. Ayudhapurushas are sometimes considered as partial incarnates of their divine owners.

The sex of the personified weapon is determined by the gender of the weapon in the Sanskrit language. The suffix "purusha" (man) is added to masculine weapons and "devi" (goddess) to female ones. The weapons Shakti, Heti (a Hatchet-like weapon) and Gada (mace), especially Kaumodaki (the mace of Vishnu), Dhanus/Dhanushya ("bow") are women. Chakra, especially Vishnu's Sudarshana Chakra (discus of Vishnu), Shankha ("conch"), Padma (lotus), Ankusha (elephant goad), Pasha (noose), Trisula (trident), vajra (thunderbolt), Khadga (sword), Danda (a sceptre or club), Bana/Shara ("arrow") and Bhindi (sling) are depicted male.

While weapons are personified in ancient Hindu epics like the Ramayana and the Mahabharata, the ayudhapurushas were depicted in sculpture starting from the Gupta era. They might be depicted as humans with the weapons against them or holding the weapon or with the weapon on their head or emerging from it. The most popular ayudhapurushas are associated with the god Vishnu and appear in his iconography.

== Textual references ==
The first instance where weapons are personified in Hindu scriptures is in the Hindu epic Ramayana. Two daughters of the Prajapati Daksha, Jaya and Suprabha, are married to the sage Krisasva. For the destruction of rakshasas, Jaya bore fifty sons - powerful divine weapons who could take any form. Suprabha gave birth to fifty invincible sons who were called Samharas ("destroyers"). These magical weapons were known as Shastra-devatas – the gods of weapons - and were given to king Kaushika, who later became the sage Vishvamitra. The weapons served him and later his pupil Rama, an avatar of Vishnu. The Mahabharata states that at the time of the chakra-mushala conflict, the weapons of Krishna – another avatar of Vishnu, and his brother, Balarama, appear in human form from the heavens to watch the battle. They include Krishna's Sudarshana Chakra and Kaumodaki, and Balarama's Samvartaka (plough) and Saumanda (pestle). The Duta-Vakya ("envoy's message") of the Sanskrit playwright Bhasa (c. 2nd century BCE – 2nd century CE) describes an episode from the Mahabharata when Krishna goes as an envoy to Kauravas' court to broker peace between them and their cousins the Pandavas, on behalf of the latter. However, when the Kauravas try to arrest Krishna, Krishna assumes his Vishvarupa (universal form) and summons his weapons, who appear as humans. The ayudhapurushas include the discus Sudarshana Chakra, the bow Sharanga, the mace Kaumodaki, the conch Panchajanya, and the sword Nandaka, elaborate descriptions of whom are found in the text. This is the only Sanskrit play that depicts the weapons on stage as humans. The Raghuvamsa of Kalidasa mentions about dwarf-like ayudhapurushas denoting Vishnu's chakra, lotus, sword, bow, and mace.

== Textual descriptions ==
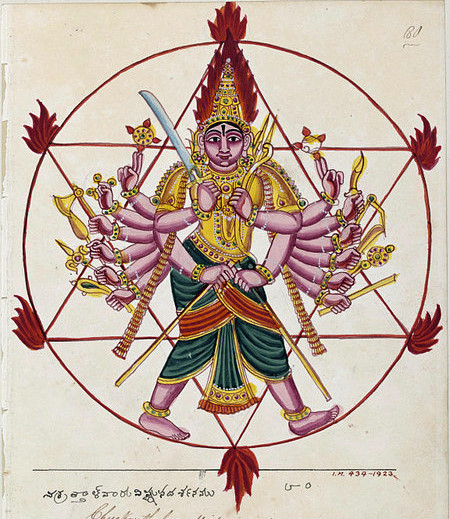
Sudarshana Chakra depicted as an ayudhapurusha and fierce aspect of his owner Vishnu.

Treatises such as the Vishnudharmottara Purana and various Agamas describe the iconography of the ayudhapurushas. Shakti is depicted as a red-hued woman seated on a wolf. The Danda is a fearful black-complexioned man with wrathful red eyes. The Khadga is also a dark and angry man. Pasha is depicted as a male snake with seven hoods. Dhvaja ("banner") is a yellow-coloured strong man with his mouth wide open. The Trishula is a handsome black-complexioned man with lovely eyebrows. The Shankha is described as a white male with adorable eyes. The Bana (arrow) is a red-coloured man with beautiful eyes, however the Vaikhaashagama describes it to be a black-complexioned eunuch with three eyes, dressed in white clothes and riding on the wind. The Dhanus (bow) is a red lotus coloured female with a stringed bow on her head. The Vishnudharmottara Purana describes Chakra as man with a fat belly and round eyes, decorated with various ornaments and holding a chamara (chowry) and with Vishnu's left hand on his head. The slim-waisted woman Gada holds a chowry in her hands and is adored with ornaments, with Vishnu's right hand resting on her head.

While the Sudarshana Chakra is depicted as a subordinate figure with Vishnu, in many South Indian Vishnu temples, the Chakra as an ayudhapurusha is worshipped in its own shrine attached to the central temple. Here, the Chakra is regarded as an aspect of Vishnu and called Chakra-rupi Vishnu – Vishnu in the form of the Chakra. In the outline of the ordinary circular Chakra with a hexagram inscribed in it (shat-kona-chakra) – stands the personified Chakra in fierce form generally with eight arms. Often, Yoga-Narasimha, the lion-man ferocious aspect of Vishnu is depicted on the back of the Chakra sculpture. The Shilparatna describes that the fierce Chakra-rupi Vishnu should hold in his hands gada, chakra, a snake, a lotus, musala (a pestle), tramsha, pasha and ankusha. He is depicted as radiant as the sun and with protruding tusks from the sides of his mouth. Another description describes the Chakra as a sixteen-armed fierce form of Vishnu. He holds a chakra, shankha, bow, parashu, asi (sword), arrow, trishula, pasha, ankusha, agni (fire), khadga (sword), shield, hala (plough), musala, gada and kunta. Three-eyed and golden-coloured with protruding tusks, the Chakra stands in the shat-kona-chakra, with Narasimha on the reverse of the sculpture.

== Sculptural depictions ==
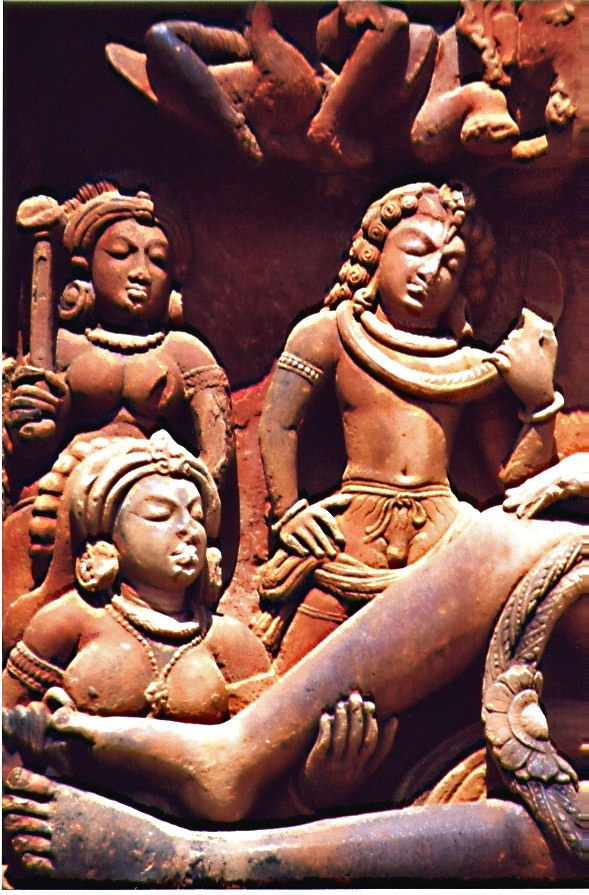
The Sudarshana Chakra is depicted against the Chakra (right) and the Kaumodaki holding a gada (left), while goddess Lakshmi, Vishnu's wife, seated pressing his feet.

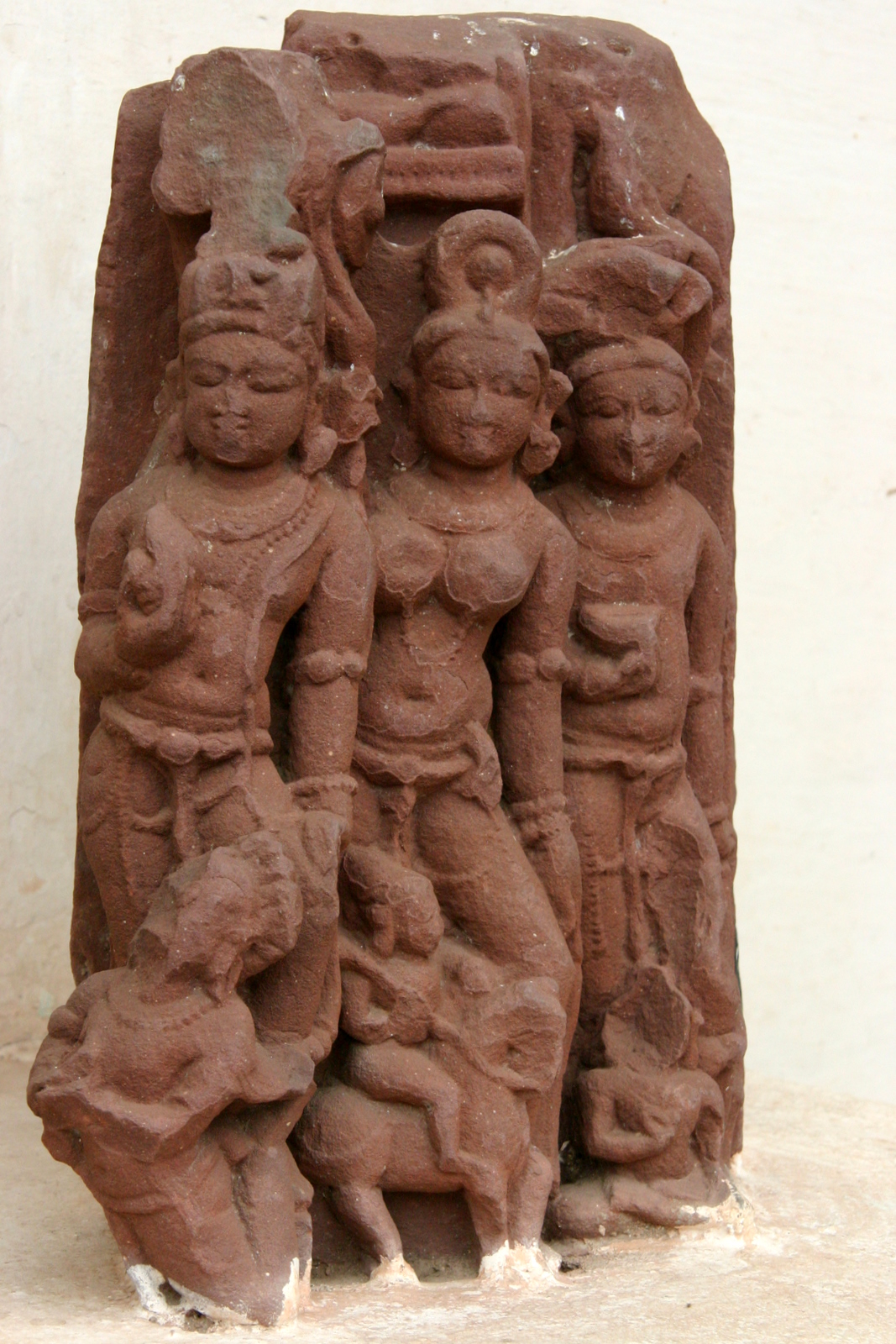
Chakra (centre) and Shankha (right) with the weapons on their head.

An ayudhapurusha is generally depicted as a two-armed figure, prescribed to be shown with a karanda mukuta (conical crown). An ayudhapurusha may be depicted as a dwarf, concurring with Kalidasa's description in the Raghuvamsa. Such icons are present in Rajgir, Mahabalipuram and Badami. They may be depicted as normal humans as in Udayagiri Caves and in the Sheshashayi Vishnu panel of the Gupta era (320–550 CE) Deogarh temple. At Deogarh, the Sudarshana Chakra is depicted against the Chakra/wheel and the Kaumodaki holding a gada. In another instance, the ayudhapurushas are depicted without their weapons, though C. Sivaramamurti opines that there is enough evidence to identify them as ayudhapurushas. The human Chakrapurusha depicted against the Chakra is seen on the chakra-vikrama coin of the Gupta ruler Chandragupta II where the Chakrapurusha – here denoting the wheel of sovereignty – is dedicated bestowing the three pellets of sovereignty to the king. The Gupta era and medieval sculptures often depict the ayudhapurushas in normal human proportions. Chola and Chalukya sculptors continued the trend, mostly focussing on the Sudarshana Chakra in a fierce multiple-armed human form. Sometimes, the ayudhapurusha is depicted emerging from the associated weapon.

In another variation, the ayushapurusha stands besides the deity with folded hands (in anjali mudra posture) with the weapon depicted on the head as part of the crown or the weapon mark on the forehead. The Sudarshana Chakra with the Chakra on his head in Deogarh and Chola era bronzes of Chakra and Gada in similar fashion are some illustrations.

In the last variation of the ayudhapurusha iconography, he/she holds the associated weapon. Common examples are the Sudarshana Chakra, the Shankha-purusha and Kaumodaki, mostly found in Uttar Pradesh and Bengal art. Sharanga with the bow in his hand and Nandaka with the sword as in Deogarh are other examples.

In some cases, the weapon may be depicted as in both anthropomorphic and their true form. While the central icon of Vishnu may hold the weapons, the ayudhapurushas of the same weapon may stand at the feet of the central icon.
