= Krishna Upanishad =

Hindu Vaishnava text

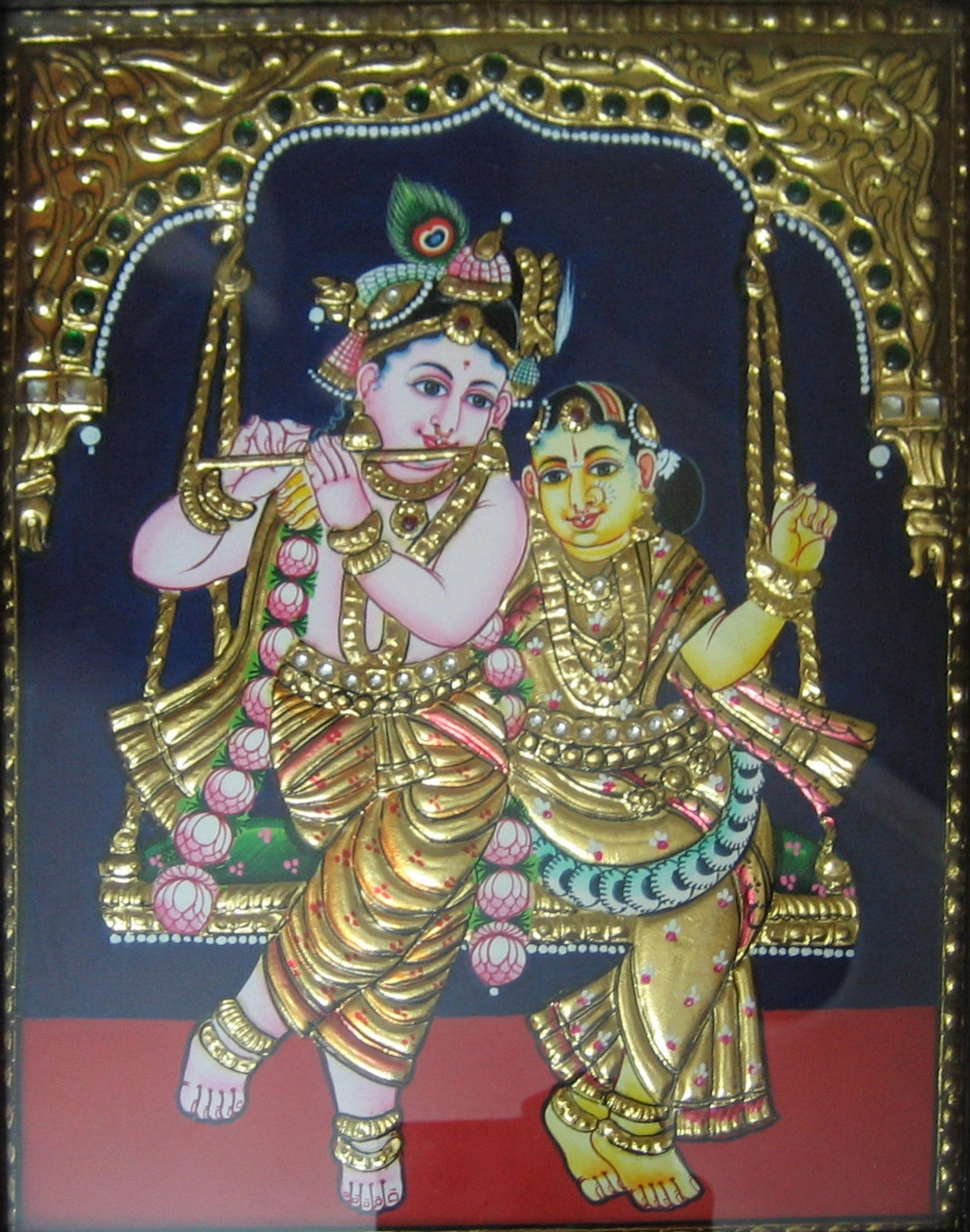
- Thanjavur painting of Krishna and his chief wife, Rukmini
- Devanagari: कृष्ण उपनिषद्
- IAST: Kṛṣṇa Upaniṣad
- Title means: The Upanishad of Krishna
- Type: Vaishnava
- Linked Veda: Atharvaveda
- Chapters: 2

The Krishna Upanishad (Sanskrit: कृष्ण उपनिषत्) or Krishnopanishad is one of 108 Upanishads of Hinduism, written in the Sanskrit language. It is a minor Vaishnava Upanishad, dedicated to the god Krishna, and adheres to the tradition of Vaishnavism. The Krishna Upanishad is attached to the Atharvaveda.

The Upanishad narrates how the god Rama took birth as Krishna, and how various divinities and virtues became people or objects in Krishna's life.

== Development ==
The date or author of Krishna Upanishad is unknown. It is likely a late medieval era text. Manuscripts of this text are also found titled as Krsnopanisad. In the Telugu language anthology of 108 Upanishads of the Muktika canon, narrated by Rama to Hanuman, it is listed at number 96.

== Structure ==
The text is structured into two khanda (parts). The first part is in verse form, the second in prose form. However, some manuscripts of the Krishna Upanishad lack the second part.

== Contents ==
=== Book I ===
The Upanishad starts with the prelude tale when the rishis (sages) come to meet the god Rama (Vishnu's seventh avatar) in the forest. Enthralled by the sight of Rama, the sages express their wish to hug him. Rama advised them to wait for making such an expression of divine love. Rama said, that even if the sages used Yoga to assume the form of females, he is unable to grant them their wish, because it would inappropriate given the vow he has given to his wife Sita. He added that he would take the avatar of Krishna and the sages will be reborn as gopis (milkmaids) when they can choose to embrace him. The sages, asserts the text, were delighted with Rama's offer.

Then the Upanishad describes the avatar of Krishna and those in his life. Krishna's childhood home Gokulam is described as heaven; Vishnu incarnated as Krishna the cowherd, gopa. His fellow cowherds were gods, states the text. His foster-parents Nanda and Yashoda were Bliss and Moksha (salvation). Those who underwent tapas were born as trees in Gokulam. Pranava (Om) became Devaki, while the Nigama of the Vedas became Vasudeva – the father of Krishna. The hymns of the Vedas became the cows, asserts Krishna Upanishad. The verses of the Upanishads became 16,108 girls infatuated with the Brahman manifested in the form of Krishna, and each herself the supreme Brahman in the hymns of Rigveda.

Mercy was born as his "mother" Rohini, Bhudevi (the earth goddess) became his wife Satyabhama. Tranquility became his friend Sudama. Anger, greed, and other vices became asuras (demons). Self-restraint (Damah), truth (Satya) and the Ocean of milk became Uddhava, Akrura, and broken curd pots for Krishna's play respectively, asserts the text. Sage Kashyapa and Aditi – the mother of the gods – became the mortar and rope to which the mischievous Krishna was tied to. Shiva, Kali, and Maya became his weapons, sword, mace, and bow respectively. The lotus in his hands is stated to be the origin of the universe. The harvest season Sharada was his food. Vishnu's abode Vaikuntha was recreated on Earth.

=== Book II ===
The second part of the text describes a symbolic reality of how living beings and virtues emerged in the universe. The text asserts that Vishnu as ultimate reality was first born into a living creature named Sanskarsana, who desired and begot offsprings, starting with god of love (Pradyumna), who himself procreated Aniruddha (unrestraint), Ahamkara (ego) and Hirangarbha (golden womb). The last procreated and produced Prajapatis, Marici, air, Sthanu, Daksha, Kardama, Priya-vrata, and Uttanapada. It is these, asserts the text, who procreated all life in the universe.

The remnants of Vishnu's Shesha asserts the text is all matter and life, as well as knowledge, and meta-knowledge. He is the embodiment of skill, and dharma (virtues) too, states the Upanishad. Meditating on this origin of the universe, of the ultimate nature of Vishnu, repeatedly muttering his name and attributes, is the path to liberation, asserts the text.

== Commentary ==
The celestials descend on Earth to be with Krishna, experience Bliss through their love of Krishna. The Upanishad advocates Bhakti yoga, serving God by love and bhakti (devotion) to achieve emancipation.

The Vaishnava philosopher Vallabhacharya in his commentary on this Upanishad observed that the gopas and the gopis were the male and female friends of Krishna. The greedy people living there were described as demons. He also stated that the five facets of ignorance, symbolized as five evil people, were eliminated by Krishna.
