= Kaumodaki =

Mace of the Hindu god Vishnu

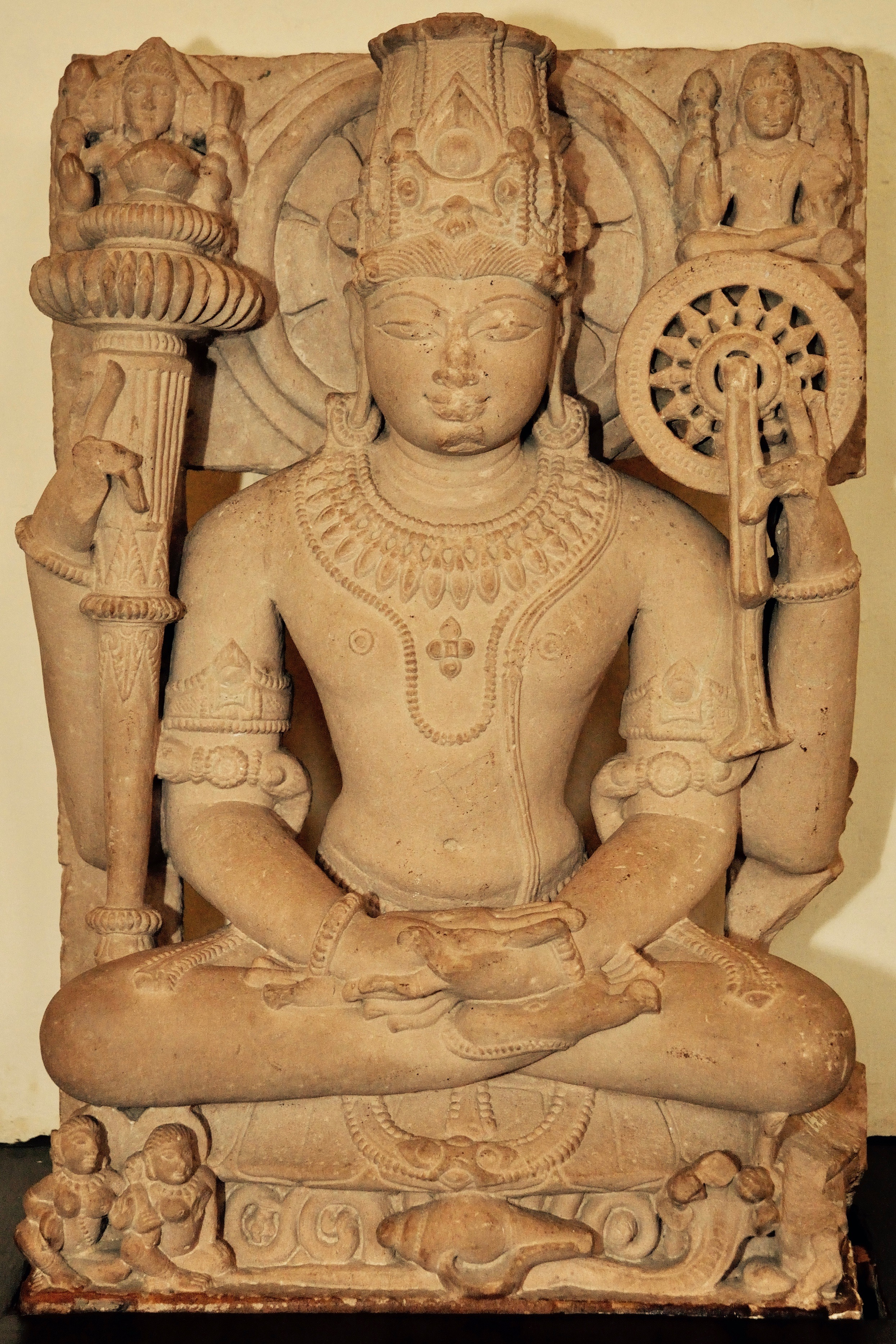
Kaumodaki in the right upper hand of a seated Vishnu, medieval sculpture currently in Mathura museum

Kaumodaki (Sanskrit: कौमोदकी, romanized: Kaumodakī, lit. 'captivator of the mind') is the gadā (mace) of Vishnu, a Hindu deity. Vishnu is often depicted holding the Kaumodaki in one of his four hands; his other attributes are the chakra, the conch and the lotus. The gada is also found in the iconography of some of Vishnu's avatars.

The name, 'Kaumodak' first appears in the Hindu epic Mahabharata, where it is associated with Vishnu's avatar, Krishna. The gada is depicted in images of Vishnu since c. 200 BCE. While initially unadorned, the size and shape of Kaumodaki vary in depictions. More elaborate design features like flutes and segments were added in depictions of Vishnu's gada.

Though the weapon may be depicted as an inanimate gada, Kaumodaki sometimes appears personified as a woman known as Gadadevi or Gadanari in sculptures of Vishnu. In depictions that use this version, Vishnu rests one of his hands on her head, while she herself holds the gada, is seen emerging from it or has the gada carved on her head/crown.

The gada, regarded as one of the oldest and strongest weapons, is a symbol of Vishnu's shakti. Various texts discuss the symbolism of Kaumodaki in Vishnu's iconography.

== Etymology ==
The etymology of, 'Kaumodaki' is unclear. According to a popular etymology, Kaumodaki derives its name from the Sanskrit word kumuda, the blue water-lily or the blue lotus (Nymphaea nouchali). Another theory suggests that the mace may derive its name from the epithet of Vishnu, Kumodaka or vice versa. The literal synonym of Kaumodaki, kaumudi is interpreted as "joy on the earth". Based on the Vishnu Purana, Alain Daniélou translates Kaumodaki as "stupefier of the mind".

== Iconography ==
Vishnu is usually depicted as four-armed with the four attributes in his hands: the Panchajanya, the Sudarshana Chakra, the Padma and the Kaumodaki. A popular epithet of Vishnu is Shankha-chakra-gada-pani, "he who holds in his hands shankha, chakra, and gada". Generally, the gada is held in the lower (natural) left hand of Vishnu in contemporary images. The gada sometimes also appears in the depictions of Vishnu's avatars Matsya, Kurma, Varaha and Narasimha.

The gada appears as an attribute in the oldest known sculpture of Vishnu (from Malhar, Chhattisgarh), dated to c. 200 BCE. One of the earliest images of Vishnu date to the Kushan period (30–375 CE) found around Mathura, the gada does not appear in a stylised design as in later depictions, but the mace is a simple "round top-heavy rod" held in his upper (back) right hand and lifted above the shoulders. In another Kushan sculpture, the gada is depicted as a long rod which is almost the height of Vishnu and is held in his upper right hand. It is depicted similar to a long pestle (musala). A similar image found in Jhusi as well as early images from Western India depict Vishnu resting his upper right hand on the mace or holding the mace in this hand. Gupta images continue the trend of having upper (back) right hand resting on or holding the gada. The gada started being depicted in other arms. Twenty-four configurations of Vishnu images are noted, where the order of the four attributes is changed.

While the hand holding the gada changed, the design of the weapon transformed too. In late medieval art, especially Pala (8th–12th century CE), the size of the handle of the gada is reduced to a flute, while the top takes a highly decorated round form. In Uttar Pradesh, the handle is tapered and expands at the top; sphere on the top also depicted with flutes. The Chalukyan gada is thick and "barrel"-shaped, while the Pallava gada is depicted thick throughout. The Cholas carve Kaumodaki thinner, but is ridged and segmented.

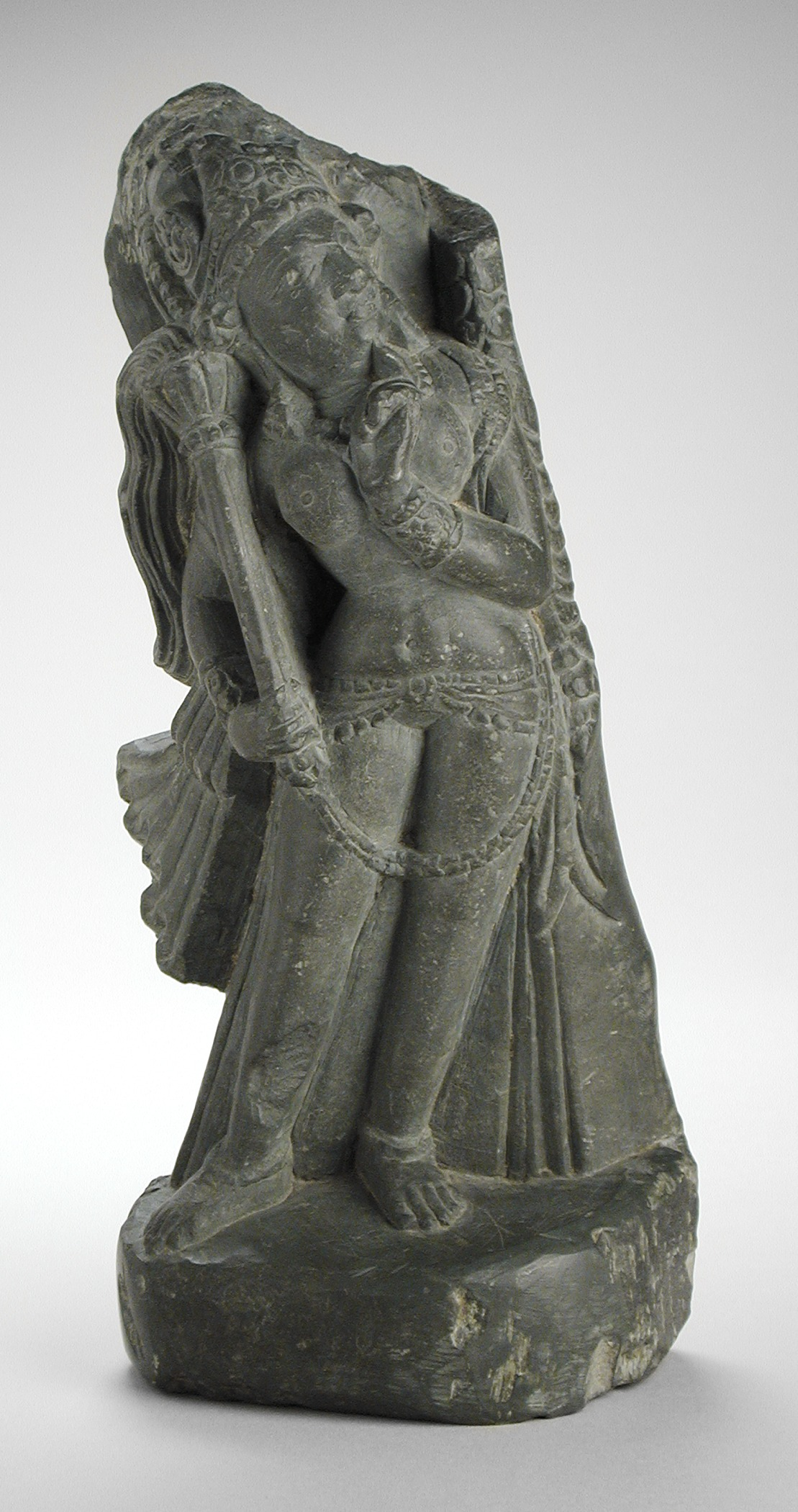
Kaumodaki as Gadadevi, personified as a woman

The Vishnudharmottara Purana describes the iconography of Vishnu. While the lotus and shankha are held in the upper hands, the lower hands rest on two dwarf figures: the personified gada and chakra. The gada personified as a slim-waisted woman, holds a fly-whisk (chamara or chowry) in her hands and is adorned with ornaments, with Vishnu's right hand resting on her head; chakra stands as a man on Vishnu's left. The personified weapons known as Ayudhapurusha emerge in Gupta era (320–550 CE) sculptures. The personified Kaumodaki is also known as Gada-Devi (the suffix devi means goddess) or Gada-nari ("gada-woman"). Since the Sanskrit word gada is feminine, gada is regarded as a woman. A Gupta Vishnu in Udayagiri Caves depicts Vishnu accompanied by Gadadevi and the personified chakra. Gadadevi often appears in Vishnu images from Kashmir, including Vishnu's four-headed form Vaikuntha Chaturmurti. She holds a chamara and looks in adoration towards her master, whose hand rests on her head. She wears a crown or has an elaborate hairstyle. Apart from a lower garment, she might wear a blouse or have a bare torso. She is depicted emerging from the gada.

Gadadevi may be depicted as a dwarf or as a normal human as in the Sheshashayi Vishnu panel of the Gupta Deogarh temple. She is depicted holding the gada. The motif of Kaumodaki holding the gada is mostly found in Uttar Pradesh and Bengal art. In another variation, Kaumodaki stands besides Vishnu with folded hands (in anjali mudra posture) with the gada depicted on the head as part of the crown or the weapon mark on her forehead, as in Chola era bronzes of the gada.

== Development and symbolism ==
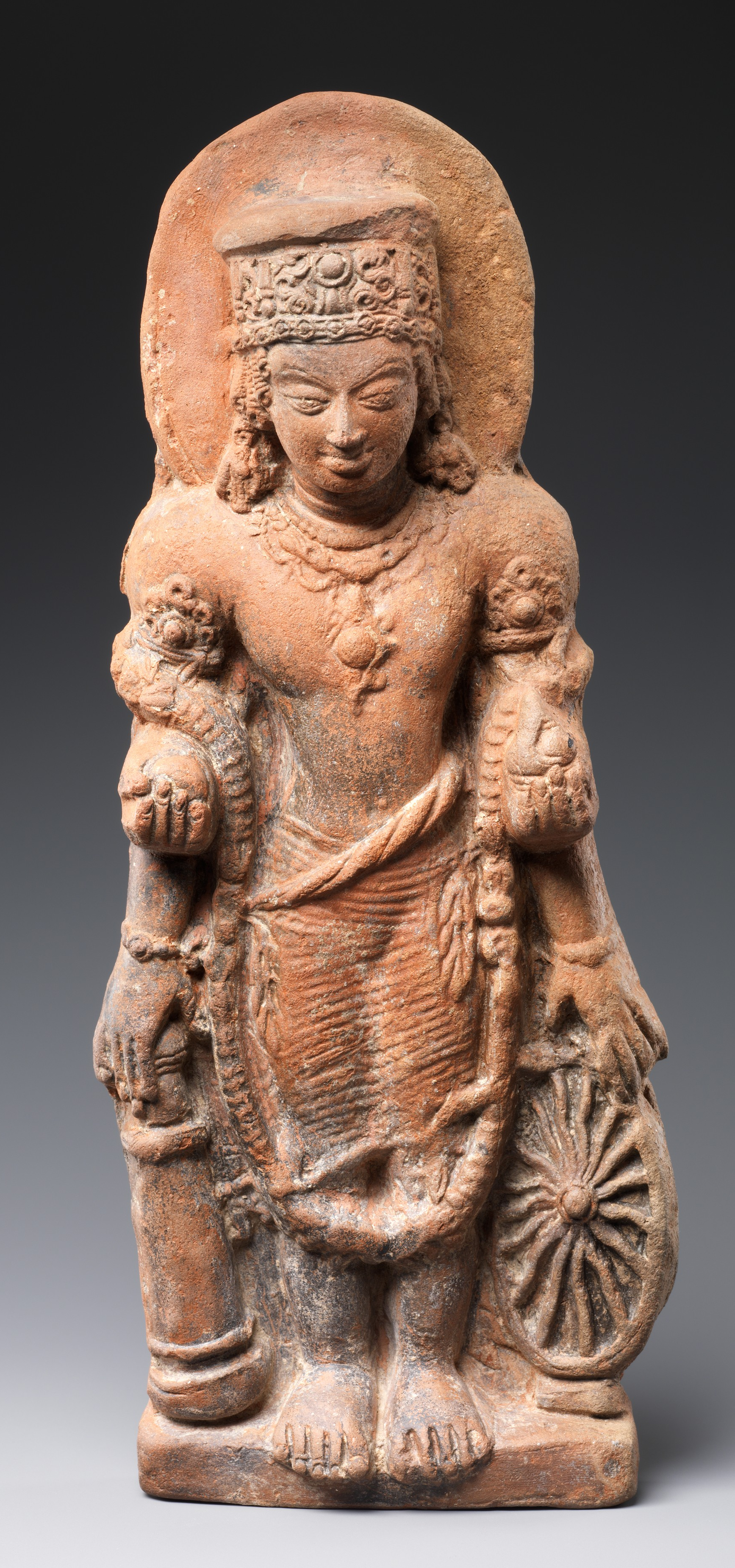
Vishnu holds the Kaumodaki in his lower right hand; 5th century.

The mace or club is one of the oldest types of weapons. The popularity of the weapons with Vishnu worshippers may have led to its depiction with the deity. The gada – a symbol of strength – was a common weapon for hand-to-hand combat and was regarded as the strongest of weapons. Vishnu's attributes originate from his avatars, Rama and Krishna, the heroes of the ancient Hindu epics Ramayana and Mahabharata (existing in the 5th to 4th century BCE) respectively. Both the epics narrate various characters – gods, men and demons alike – using the gada.

In the philosophical meaning expounded by the Vishnu-worshipping Vaishnava sect, Kaumodaki symbolizes "the intellect, the power of knowledge and the power of time". While explaining the symbolism of four attributes in Vishnu's hands, the Gopala Tapani Upanishad says that the gada – which represents primordial knowledge – is held in the lower left hand, which denotes "individual existence". The Vishnu Purana calls the gada the power of knowledge. Kaumodaki is said to "intoxicate" the mind.

According to the Vishnudharmottara Purana, Kaumodaki represents Vishnu's wife Lakshmi, the goddess of wealth and beauty. The Krishna Upanishad equates the gada to the goddess Kali, "the power of time". The text further says that like the invincible Time, the mace is the destroyer of all opponents.

Another interpretation suggests that the Kaumodaki symbolizes the life-force (prana) from which all "physical and mental powers" arise. Vishnu's gada also stands for discipline, complemented by his lotus, that denotes praise. While the lotus and shankha in his hands are water symbols representing life and love, the gada and the chakra are fire symbols denoting pain and destruction and command adherence to the rules of society and nature. The Varaha Purana says the gada is to teach a lesson to irreligious rulers. Vishnu is also said to clear illusion by his gada.

== Literature ==
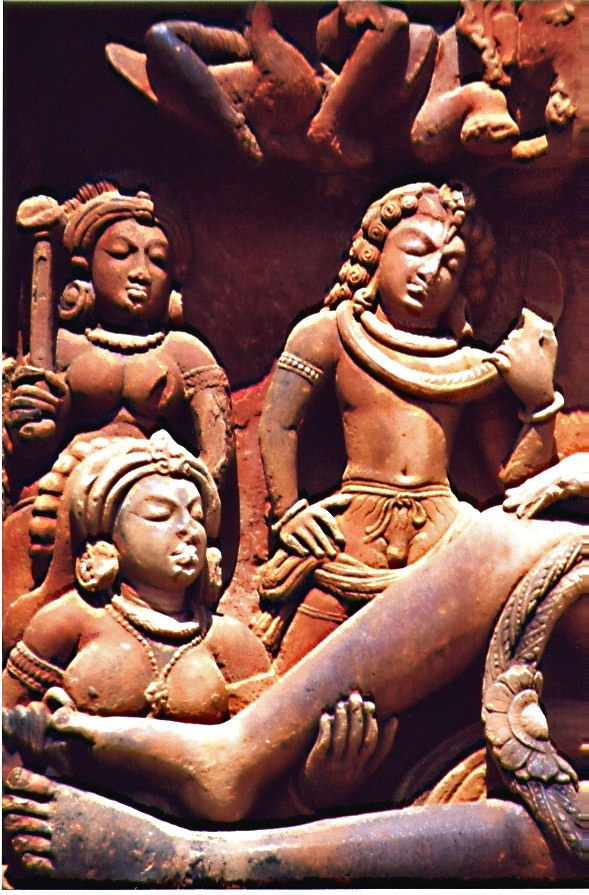
Kaumodaki personified as a woman stands with a gada (left, standing) with Chakra-man (right), while goddess Lakshmi, Vishnu's wife, seated presses his feet.

In the Mahabharata, Kaumodaki is described to sound like the lightning and was capable of slaying many daityas (demons). It is granted to Vishnu-Krishna by Varuna, the god of the seas. The Pandava princes were given the Khandava Forest to build their kingdom. The fire-god Agni wanted to "eat" the forest to cure his indigestion. He asked the Pandava Arjuna and his friend Krishna to aid him, as he feared the king of the gods and protector of the forest, Indra, will interfere. Arjuna and Krishna agreed and were given celestial weapons by Varuna. Krishna was given the Sudarshana Chakra and Kaumodaki gada, while Arjuna got the bow Gandiva and various divine arrows. The duo defeat Indra and Agni burns down the forest, pacing way for the establishment of the Pandava capital Indraprastha.

The Mahabharata describes Vishnu holding a gada and a chakra, possibly indicating two-armed images of Vishnu. The Mahabharata also records at the time of the chakra-musala war, Krishna's Kaumodaki along with other weapons appear in human form from the heavens to watch the battle. The Harivamsa, an appendix to the Mahabharata describes four of Vishnu's weapons fall from the heavens to aid Krishna and his brother Balarama in his battle against Jarasandha. Balarama uses the plough and the club called Saunanda; while Krishna battles with Kaumodaki and the bow Sharanga.

The Duta-Vakya ("envoy's message") of the Sanskrit playwright Bhasa (c. 2nd century BCE – 2nd century CE) describes an episode from the Mahabharata when Krishna depicts his Vishvarupa (all pervading "Universal form") in the Hastinapura court and summons his weapons, who appear as humans, including the Kaumodaki. The Raghuvamsa of Kalidasa mentions dwarf-like ayudhapurushas including Vishnu's mace.

In the Garuda Purana, the Kaumodaki is mentioned in the Vishnu Panjaram:

Take up thy club Kaumodaki, O lotus-navelled deity, salutation unto thee.

— Garuda Purana, Chapter 13
