= Vishvarupa =

Universal form of vishnu in Hinduism

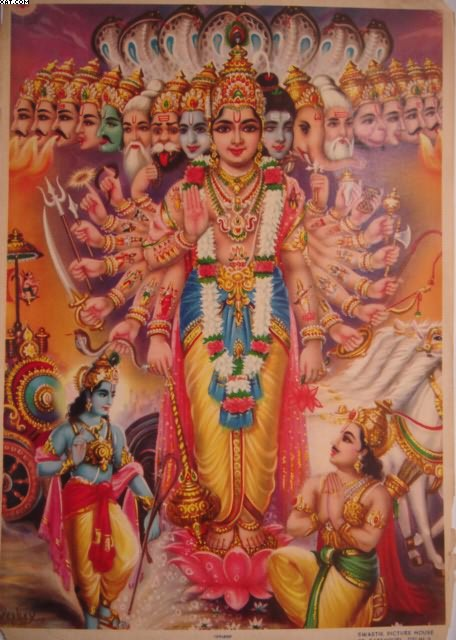
Arjuna bows to the Vishvarupa of Vishnu-Krishna.

Vishvarupa (Sanskrit: विश्वरूप, romanized: Viśvarūpa, lit. 'universal form'), also spelt as Vishwaroopa and known as Virāḍrūpa, is an iconographical form and theophany of Hindu deity Vishnu in contemporary Hinduism. Though there are multiple Vishvarupa theophanies, the most celebrated is in the Bhagavad Gita, given by Krishna in the epic Mahabharata, which was shown to Pandava prince Arjuna on the battlefield of Kurukshetra in the war between the Pandavas and Kauravas. Vishvarupa is considered the supreme form of Vishnu, where the whole universe is described as contained within him.

== Literary descriptions ==
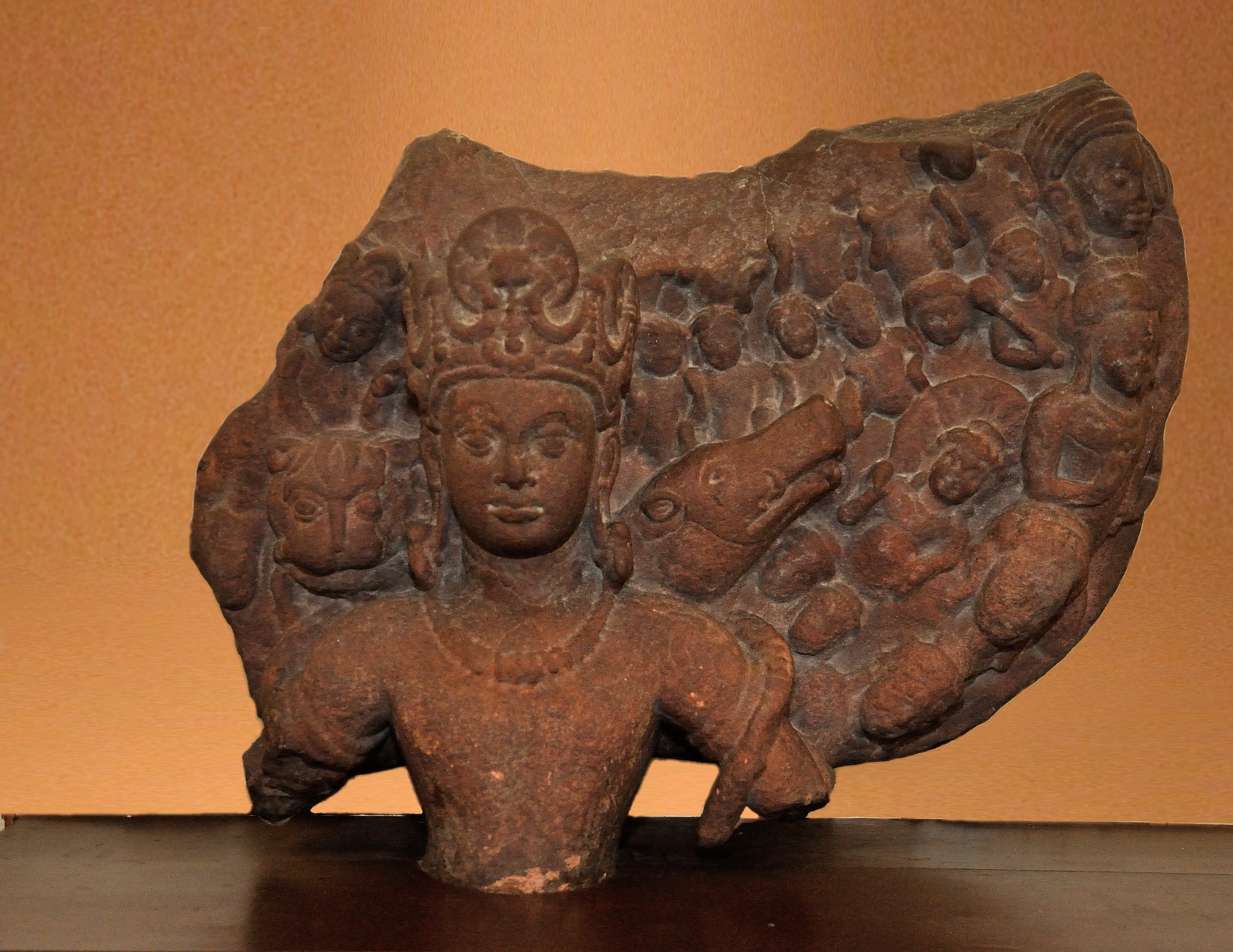
Early Visnu Visvarupa: Vishnu as three-headed cosmic creator, showing Vishnu with a human head, flanked by his avatars (the head of a lion for Narasimha, the muzzle of a boar for Varaha), with a multitude of beings on his aureole, symbol of the emanations resulting from his creative power. 5th century CE, Art of Mathura

=== Bhagavad Gita ===
In the climactic war in the Mahabharata, the Pandava prince Arjuna and his brothers fight against their cousins, the Kauravas, with Krishna as Arjuna's charioteer. Faced with the moral dilemma of whether or not to fight against and kill his own family, Arjuna has a crisis of conscience. To appease him, Krishna discourses with Arjuna about life and death as well as dharma (duty) and yoga in form of the Bhagavad Gita. In chapters 10 and 11, Krishna reveals himself as the Supreme Being and finally displays his Vishvarupa to Arjuna. Arjuna experiences the vision of the Vishvarupa with divine vision endowed to him by Krishna. Vishvarupa's appearance is described by Arjuna, as he witnesses it.

Vishvarupa has innumerable forms, eyes, faces, mouths and arms. (11:16) All creatures of the universe are part of him. He is the infinite universe, without a beginning or an end. He contains peaceful as well as wrathful forms. Unable to bear the scale of the sight and gripped with fear, Arjuna requests Krishna to return to his four-armed Vishnu form, which he can bear to see. Fully encouraged by the teachings and darshan of Krishna in his full form, Arjuna continues the Mahabharata War.

=== Mahabharata ===
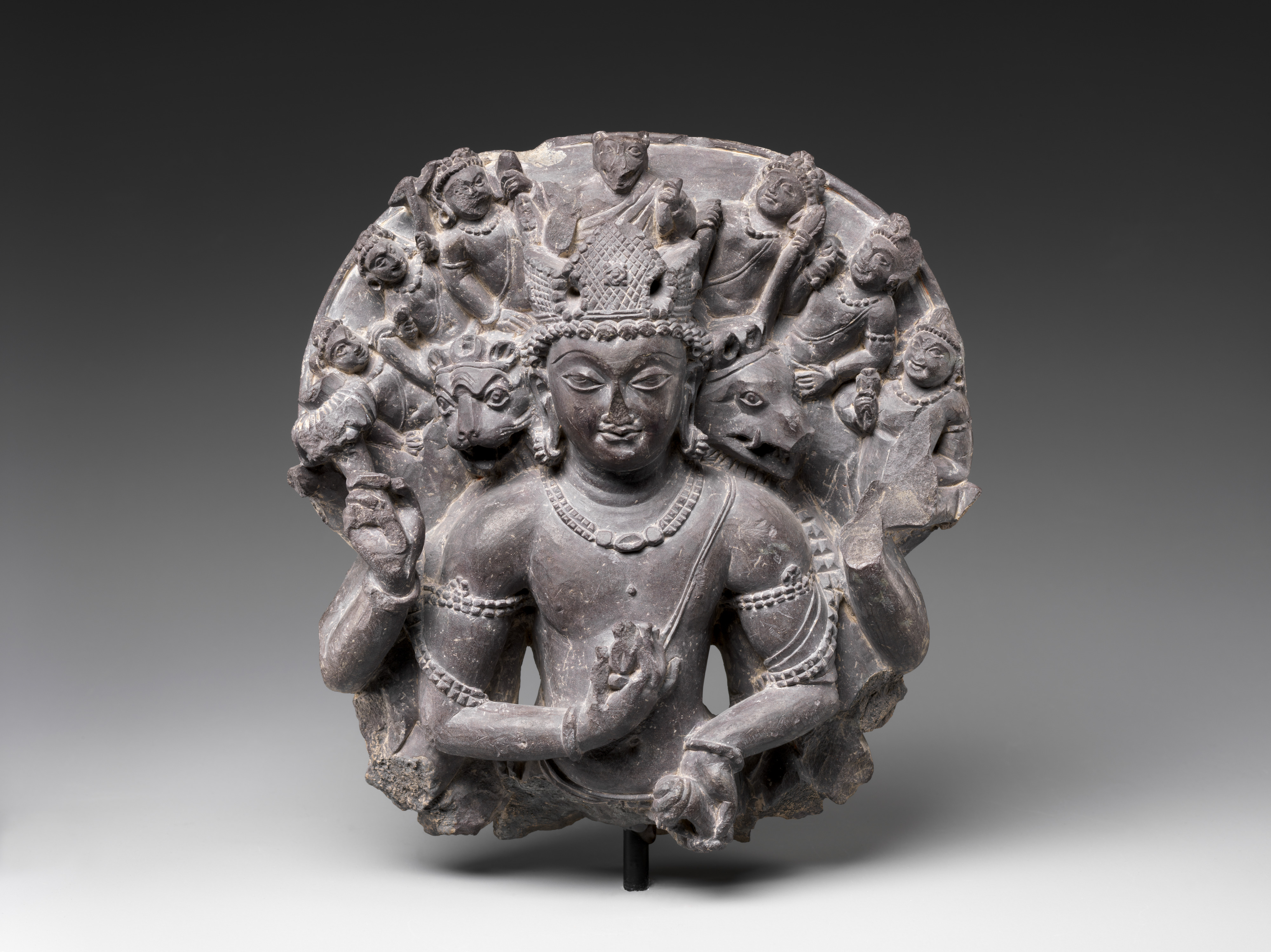
Vishvarupa Vishnu, Kingdom of Kashmir, Jammu & Kashmir, 6th century CE

There are two more descriptions in the Mahabharata, where Krishna or Vishnu-Narayana offers the theophany similar to the Vishvarupa in the Bhagavad Gita. When negotiations between Pandavas and Kauravas break down with Krishna as the Pandava messenger, Krishna declares that he is more than human and displays his cosmic form to the Kaurava leader Duryodhana and his assembly. Vishvarupa-Krishna appears with many arms and holds many weapons and attributes traditionally associated with Vishnu like the conch, the Sudarshana chakra, the gada (mace), his bow, his sword Nandaka. The inside of his body is described. Various deities (including Vasus, Rudras, Adityas, Dikpalas), sages and tribes (especially those opposing the Kauravas, including the Pandavas) are seen in his body. This form is described as terrible and only people blessed with divine vision could withstand the sight.

The other theophany of Vishnu (Narayana) is revealed to the divine sage Narada. The theophany is called Vishvamurti. The god has a thousand eyes, a hundred heads, a thousand feet, a thousand bellies, a thousand arms and several mouths. He holds weapons as well as attributes of an ascetic like sacrificial fire, a staff, a kamandalu (water pot).

Another theophany in the Mahabharata is of a Vaishnava (related to Vishnu or Krishna) form. It misses the multiple body parts of Vishvarupa, but conveys the vastness and cosmic nature of the deity. His head covers the sky. His two feet cover all ground. His two arms encompass the horizontal space. His belly occupies the reattaining space in the universe.

=== Other texts ===
Vishvarupa is also stated as the Harivamsa, as Vishnu's consisting form of all gods. During a Devasura war, he took this form and slew the demons (including Taraka and Maya).

Vishvarupa is also used in the context of Vishnu's "dwarf" avatar, Vamana in another part in the Harivamsa. Vamana, arrives at the asura king Bali's sacrifice as a dwarf Brahmin boy and asks for three steps of land as donation. Where the promise is given, Vamana transforms into his Vishvarupa, containing various deities in his body. The Sun and the Moon are his eyes. The Earth his feet and heaven is his head. Various deities; celestial beings like Vasus, Maruts, Ashvins, Yakshas, Gandharvas, Apsaras; Vedic scriptures and sacrifices are contained in his body. With two of his strides, he gains heaven and Earth and places the third on Bali's head, who accepts his mastership. Bali is then pushed to the realm of Patala (underworld).

== Development ==
The name Viśvarūpa (Sanskrit: विश्वरूप) is composed from viśva and rūpa. Taken together, it refers to an omniscient form that pervades the entire universe. It first appears as a name of Trisiras, the three-headed son of Tvastr, the Vedic creator-god who grants form to all beings. In the Rig Veda, he is described as generating many forms and containing several forms in his womb. The epithet Vishvarupa is also used for other deities like Soma (Rig Veda), Prajapati (Atharva Veda), Rudra (Upanishad) and the abstract Brahman (Maitrayaniya Upanishad). The Atharva Veda uses the word with a different connotation – a bride is blessed to be vishvarupa (all-formed) - to be showered with glory and offspring.

Then, Vishvarupa is revealed in the Srimad Bhagavad Gita and then the Puranas in connection to Vishnu-Krishna. However, these literary sources do not detail the iconography of Vishvarupa. The Bhagavad Gita may be inspired by the description of Purusha as thousand-headed, thousand-eyed and thousand-footed or a cosmic Vishnu ("creator of the universe").

Vishvarupa is mentioned as Vishnu's avatar in Pañcaratra texts like the Satvata Samhita and the Ahirbudhnya Samhita (which mention 39 avatars) as well as the Vishnudharmottara Purana, that mentions 14 avatars.

Vishvarupa is also interpreted as "the story of evolution", as the individual evolves in this world doing more and more with time. The Vishvarupa is a cosmic representation of gods and goddesses, sages and asuras, good and the bad as we perceive in our own particular perspective of existence in this world.

== Iconography ==
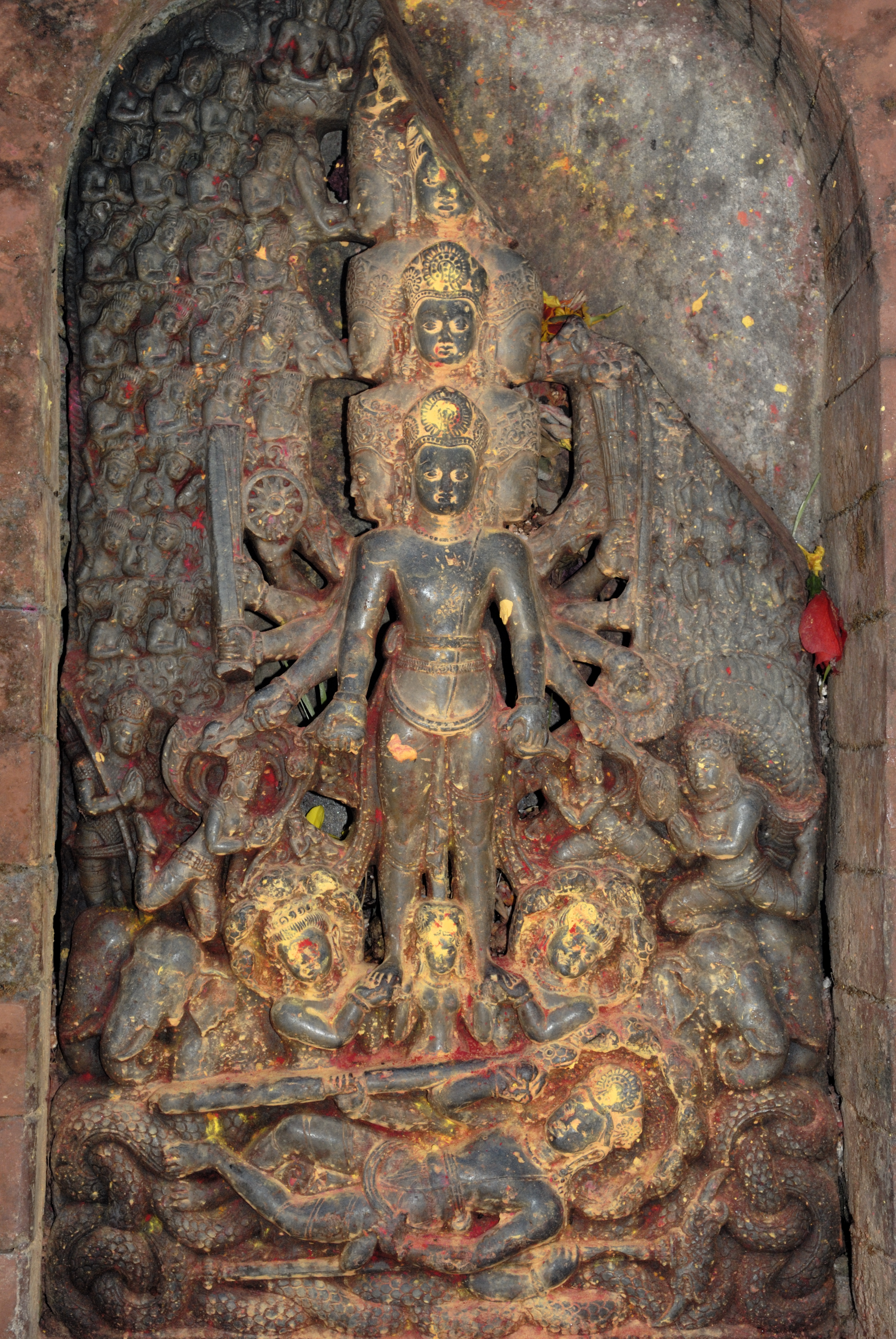
Changu Narayan temple Vishvarupa

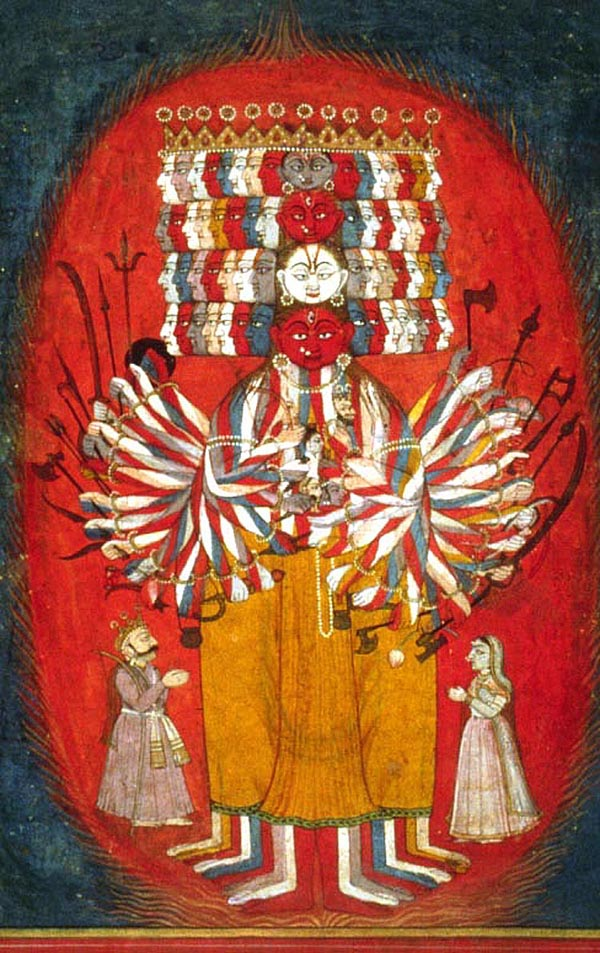
Vishvarupa with many heads, arms and legs, c.1740, Bilaspur

=== Early depictions ===
The literary sources mentions that Vishvarupa has "multiple" or "thousand/hundred" (numeric equivalent of conveying infinite in literary sources) heads and arms, but do not give a specific number of body parts that can be depicted. Early Gupta and post-Gupta sculptors were faced with difficulty of portraying infiniteness and multiple body parts in a feasible way. Arjuna's description of Vishvarupa gave iconographers two options: Vishvarupa as a multi-headed and multi-armed god or all components of the universe displayed in the body of the deity. Early Vishvarupa chose the former, while Buddhist images of a Cosmic Buddha were displayed in the latter format. An icon, discovered in Parel, Mumbai dated to c. 600, has seven figures all appearing interlinked to each other. Though the icon mirrors the Vishvarupa of Vishnu, it is actually a rare image of the Vishvarupa of Shiva.

Vishvarupa becomes crystallized as an icon in the early Vishnu cult by the time of Guptas (6th century CE). The first known image of Vishvarupa is a Gupta stone image from the Mathura school, found in Bhankari, Angarh district, dated c. 430-60 CE. The Gupta sculptor is inspired by the Bhagavad Gita description. Visvarupa has three heads: a human (centre), a lion (the head of Narasimha, the man-lion avatar of Vishnu) and a boar (the head of Varaha, the boar avatar of Vishnu) and four arms. Multiple beings and Vishnu's various avatars emerge from the main figure, accompanying half of the 38 cm (high) X 47 cm (wide) stela. Another early image (70 cm high) is present in the Changu Narayan temple, Nepal, dated 5th-6th century. The central image is ten-headed and ten-armed and is surrounded by the three regions of Hindu cosmology, Svarga (heavenly realms, upper portion of the stone relief), Prithvi (the earth, the middle) and Patala (the underworld, the bottom) and corresponding beings gods, humans and animals and nagas and spirits respectively. The figures on his right are demonic while on the left are divine, representing the dichotomy of his form. A similar early image is also found at and the Varaha Temple, Deogarh, Uttar Pradesh. A 5th century Garhwa image shows Vishvarupa with six arms and three visible heads: a horse (centre, Hayagriva-avatar of Vishnu), a lion and a boar. Possibly a fourth head existed which popped up from the horse head. An aureole of human head surround the central heads. Flames emitting from the figure, illustrating its blazing nature as described by Arjuna. Three Vishvarupa icons from Shamalaji, Gujarat dated sixth century have three visible animal heads and eight arms, with a band of beings emanating from the upper part of the deity forming an aureole. Unlike other icons which are in standing position, the Shamalaji icons are in a crouching position, as though giving birth and is similar to icons of birth-giving mother goddesses in posture. The posture may convey the idea that he is giving birth to the beings radiating from him, though none of them are near his lower area.

=== Scriptural iconographic descriptions ===
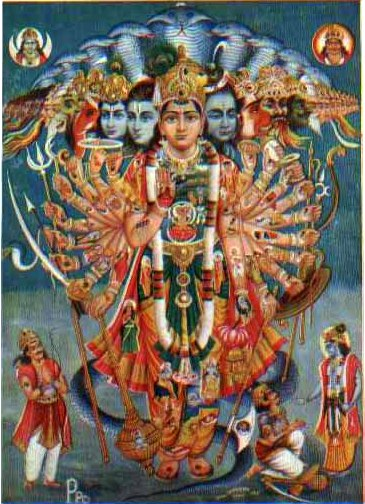
c.1900s Vishvarupa lithograph

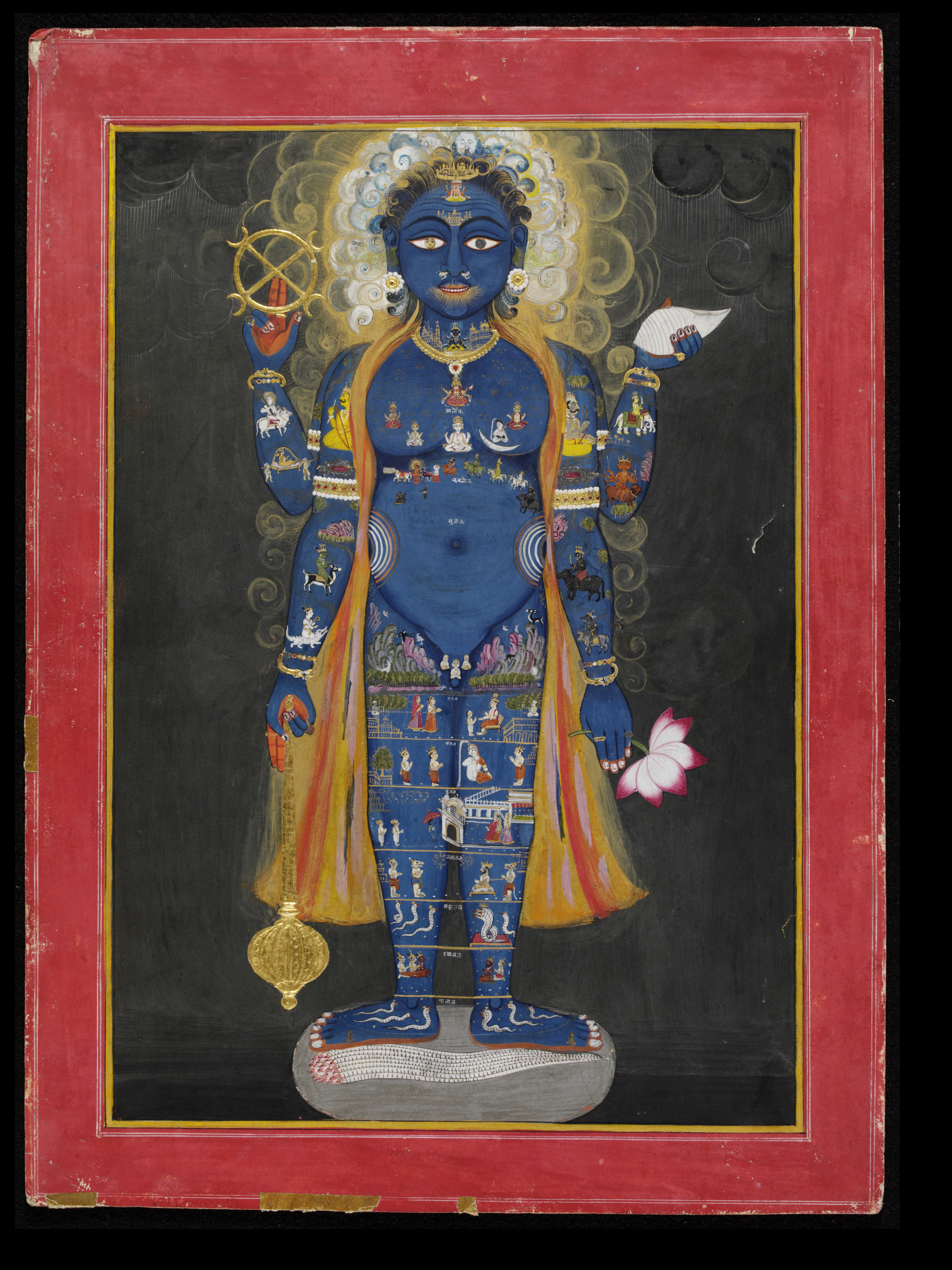
Vishvarupa with the three realms: heaven (head to belly), earth (groin), underworld (legs), c. 1800-50, Jaipur

The Vishnudharmottara Purana prescribes that Vishvarupa have four arms and should have as many as arms that can be possibly depicted. A 12th-century sculpture of Vishvarupa from Rajasthan shows a fourteen-armed Vishnu riding his mount Garuda. The image has three visible human heads, unlike the early sculptures which include animal ones. Some iconographic treatises prescribe a fourth demonic head at the back, however this is generally not depicted in iconography.

Another iconography prescribes that Vishvarupa be depicted with four faces: male (front, east), lion/Narasimha (south), boar/Varaha (north) and woman (back/west). He should ride his Garuda. He has twenty arms: a left and right arm outstretched in pataka-hasta and another pair in yoga-mudra pose. The other fourteen hold hala (plough), shankha (conch), vajra (thunderbolt), ankusha (goad), arrow, sudarshana chakra, a lime fruit, danda (staff), pasha (noose), gada (mace), sword, lotus, horn, musala (pestle), akshamala (rosary). A hand is held in varada mudra (boon-giving gesture).

In the Bhagavata Purana, another description of this cosmic form is given by Suka to Parikshit. This form is known as Vairājaḥ Puruṣaḥ. This cosmic form is described as having the sole of his feet as patāla, his heels and toes as rasātala, ankles form the mahātala, while his shanks are talātala, sutāla is the knees, lower part of thigh is vitala and the upper part is atala. The earth (bhuloka) is his hips and the navel vault is the sky (bhuvarloka). His chest is the svargaloka, with stars. His neck is maharloka, his mouth the janaloka, his forehead the tapaloka and his head the satyaloka, abode of Brahma.

=== Depictions in Nepal ===
The artistic imagination of Hindu artists of Nepal has created iconic Vishvarupa images, expressing "sacred terror", as expressed by Arjuna. Vishvarupa has twenty heads arranged in tiers. They include Vishnu's animal avatars Matsya (fish), Kurma (tortoise), Varaha (boar), Narasimha (lion) as well as heads of vahanas (mounts) of Hindu deities: elephant (of Indra), eagle (Garuda of Vishnu), swan (Hansa of Brahma) and bull (of Shiva). Among the human heads, Vishnu's avatars as Parashurama, Rama, Krishna and Buddha. His two main hands hold the sun and the moon. He has ten visible legs and three concentric rings of hands accounting to 58. Other artistic representations of Vishvarupa in Nepal have varying number of heads, hands and legs and some have even attributes of Mahakala and Bhairava, such as flaying knife and skull bowl. Other attributes shown are arrows, bows, bell, vajra, sword with shield, umbrella and canopy. Another terrifying feature is a face on the belly that gorges a human being.

=== Modern depictions ===
In modern calendar art, Vishvarupa is depicted having many heads, each a different aspect of the divine. Some of the heads breathe fire indicating destructive aspects of God. Many deities are seen on his various body parts. His many hands hold various weapons. Often Arjuna features in this scene bowing to Vishvarupa. Jyotisar, where Krishna revealed the Bhagavad Gita to Arjuna, has a 40 feet (12 m) tall statue of Krishna in viratswaroop (vishvarupa) made of ashtadhatu (eight metals).

== In popular culture ==
In the Infinity Horizon universe, Vishva-Rupa is the name of a highly organized, eusocial civilization that inhabits the upper atmosphere of the gas giant Grro Thum.

== See also ==
- Macranthropy
- Microcosm–macrocosm analogy

== Sources ==
- Howard, Angela Falco (1986). "Possible Brahmanic Influences in the cosmological Buddha". The Imagery of the Cosmological Buddha. Brill Archive. ISBN 978-90-04-07612-9.
- Srinivasan, Doris (1997). Many Heads, Arms, and Eyes: Origin, Meaning, and Form of Multiplicity in Indian Art. BRILL. ISBN 978-90-04-10758-8.
