= Panchajanya =

Conch of the Hindu god Vishnu

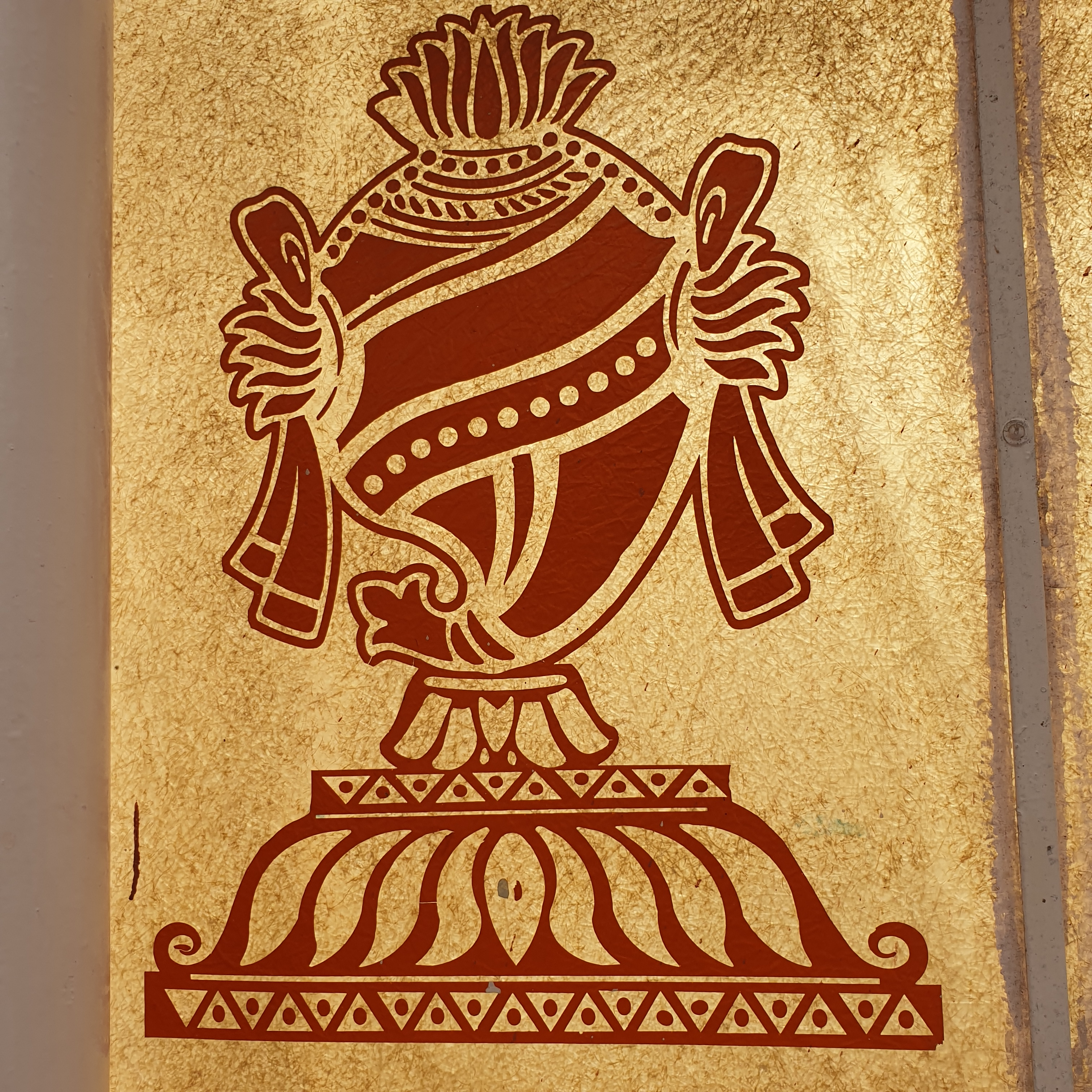
Iconography of the Panchajanya on a temple wall

Panchajanya (Sanskrit: पाञ्चजन्य, IAST: Pāñcajanya) is the shankha (conch) of the Hindu preserver deity Vishnu, one of his four primary attributes. The Panchajanya symbolises the five elements, and is considered to produce the primeval sound of creation when blown.

== Literature and Incarnations ==
=== Ramayana ===
According to the Ramayana, when Vishnu takes his seventh avatar Rama, as the son of Ayodhya's king Dasharatha, Panchajanya accompanies him (along with Shesha and Sudarshana) and takes the avatar of Bharata, Rama's younger brother. Bharata marries Mandavi, who is an avatar of Lakshmi's shankha.

=== Mahabharata ===
According to the Mahabharata, Vishnu is said to have slain a daitya (a member of a clan of asuras) named Panchajana on a mountain named Chakravan, which was constructed by Vishvakarma, and to have seized the conch shell in which Panchajana had lived. The conch is named after the daitya.

=== Bhagavad Gita ===
In the Bhagavad Gita, the Panchajanya is mentioned:

Then, Lord Krishna blew His conchshell, called Pancajanya; Arjuna blew his, the Devadatta; and Bhima, the voracious eater and performer of extremely difficult tasks, blew his terrific conchshell called Paundram

— Bhagavad Gita, Chapter 1, Verse 15

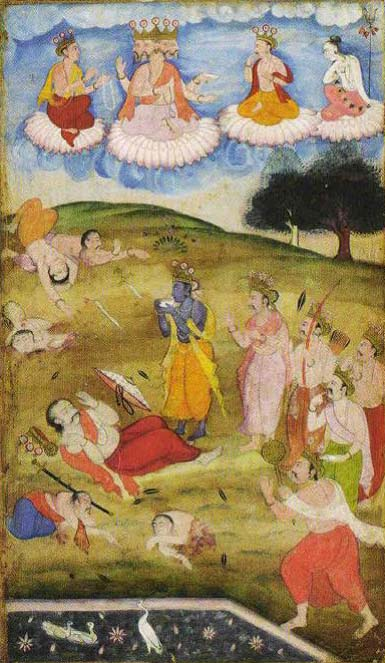
Krishna blows the Panchajanya to signal the end of the Kurukshetra War, Razmnama

=== Harivamsha ===
As per the Harivamsha, Krishna is described as possessing a conch shell called Panchajanya, one of his four attributes, along with the mace Kaumodaki, the disc-like weapon Sudarshana Chakra, and a lotus. The conch was used during the Kurukshetra War and, in popular tradition, is believed to have signaled both its beginning and end.

=== Skanda Purana ===
The Skanda Purana features two origin legends for the conch.

The Panchajanya is mentioned to be among the various substances and beings that emerged during the Samudra Manthana:

Then came out the Śārṅga bow, the presiding deity of all weapons. Then emerged Pāñcajanya, the conch, the supreme deity of all musical instruments.

— Skanda Purana, Vasudeva Mahatmya, Chapter 12, Verse 14

In another legend, Sandipani, the guru of Krishna, Balarama, Sudama, and Uddhava, states that his son was swallowed by a whale at Prabhasa while on a pilgrimage, and seeks his return as his dakshina (honorarium). The Ocean is said to have informed Krishna of a great daitya of the name Panchajana dwelling in its depths, who had indeed swallowed the boy. Krishna slew the daitya who was in the form of a whale, and seized from within him the Panchajanya, a conch that had previously belonged to Varuna. Not finding his guru's son, Krishna descended to Naraka with Balarama and demanded his return. Yama and Chitragupta battled the deities until Brahma intervened and urged Yama to restore the boy back to life. His desire fulfilled, Brahma eulogised Krishna, prompting him to blow his conch:

The sound of the conch was conducive to the liberation of the men who had committed sinful activities and therefore had been consigned to hells. Due to the sound of the conch and the recollection of Acyuta, all of them got into divine aerial chariots and went to heaven. That region (of hell) became a void, due to the contact with Nārāyaṇa.

— Skanda Purana, Avantiksetra Mahatmya, Chapter 1, Verses 101 - 102

Krishna and Balarama then returned the son back to his father, who rejoiced in surprise and hailed their names.
