= Shaivism =

Hindu tradition that worships Shiva

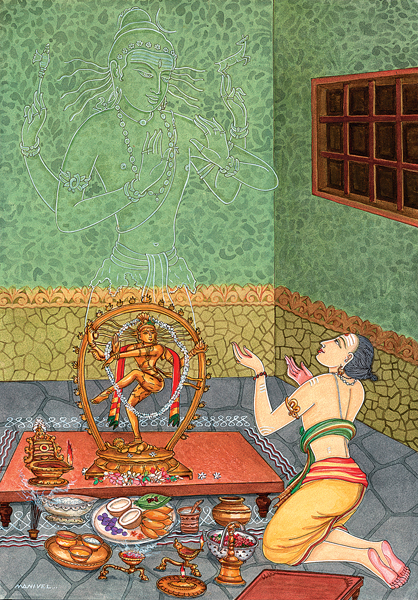
- Shiva (above) is the primary God in Shaivism.

Shaivism (/ˈʃaɪvɪzəm/; Sanskrit: शैवसंप्रदायः, romanised: Śaivasampradāyaḥ) is an umbrella-term for a number of Hindu religious traditions, which worship Shiva as the supreme being. The followers of Shaivism are called Shaivas or Shaivites, numbering about 385 million people, across South Asia predominantly in India, Sri Lanka, and Nepal.

Shaivism developed as an amalgam of pre-Aryan religions and traditions, Vedic Rudra, and post-Vedic traditions, accommodating local traditions and Yoga, puja and bhakti. Worship of the Vedic deity Rudra forms its earliest traceable root, but the earliest evidence for sectarian Rudra-Shiva worship appears with the Pasupata (early CE), which emerged with the Hindu synthesis, when many local traditions were aligned with the Vedic-Brahmanical fold. The Pāśupata movement rapidly expanded throughout North India, giving rise to different forms of Shaivism and followed by the emergence of various tantric traditions. Both devotional and monistic Shaivism became popular in the 1st millennium CE, and it became the dominant religious tradition of several Hindu kingdoms. It arrived in Southeast Asia shortly thereafter, leading to the construction of thousands of Shaiva temples on the islands of Indonesia as well as Cambodia and Vietnam, co-evolving with Buddhism in these regions.

Shaivism encompasses a wide range of sub-traditions. Historically, a basic distinction can be made between Puranic Shaivism, such as the Shiva-worship in the Smarta tradition, and non-Puranic (Agamic/Tantric) Shaivism. The latter is further divided in the atimarga, solely for sanyassins (ascetic renunciates), and the mantramarga, open to both sanyassons and householders. Within the mantramarga, the Shaiva Siddhanta is devotional dualistic theism, while the Tantric Kapalika gave rise to a number of yoga-oriented monistic systems, such as the Trika and Kashmiri Shaivism. Tantric Shaivism is closely related to Shaktism, and some Shaivas worship in both Shiva and Shakti temples. It is the Hindu tradition that most accepts ascetic life and emphasises yoga, and encourages one to discover and be one with Shiva within.

It has a vast literature, making appeals to Vedic orthodoxy but viewing the Agama texts as superior revelations.

== Etymology and nomenclature ==
Shiva (śiva, Sanskrit: शिव) literally means kind, friendly, gracious, or auspicious. As a proper name, it means "The Auspicious One".

The word Shiva is used as an adjective in the Rig Veda, as an epithet for several Rigvedic deities, including Rudra. The term Shiva also connotes "liberation, final emancipation" and "the auspicious one", this adjective sense of usage is addressed to many deities in Vedic layers of literature. The term evolved from the Vedic Rudra-Shiva to the noun Shiva in the Epics and the Puranas, as an auspicious deity who is the "creator, reproducer and dissolver".

The Sanskrit word śaiva or shaiva means "relating to the god Shiva", while the related beliefs, practices, history, literature and sub-traditions constitute Shaivism.

== Origins and history ==
The origins of Shaivism are unclear and a matter of debate among scholars. According to Chakravarti, it is an amalgam of pre-Vedic cults and traditions and Vedic culture. Gavin Flood associates it with the Brahmanization of local traditions. According to Bisschop, the earliest traceable root of Shaivism is the worship of the Vedic deity Rudra.

=== Indus Valley Civilisation ===
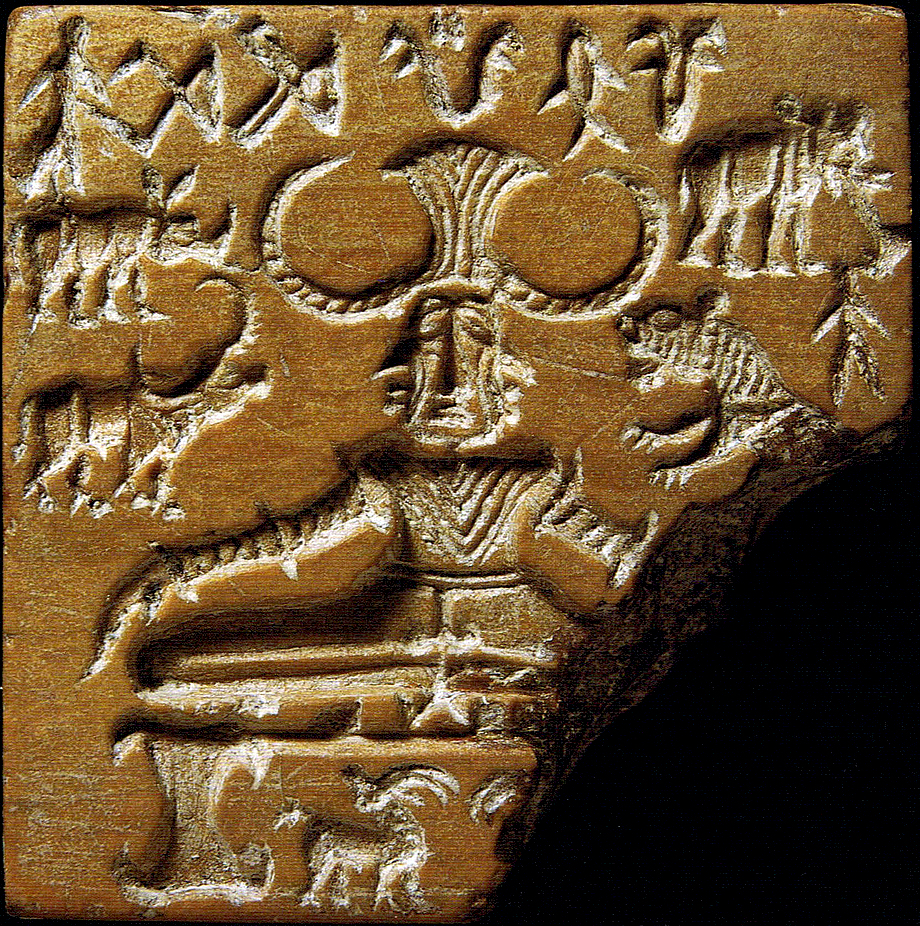
The "Pashupati" seal from the Indus Valley civilisation

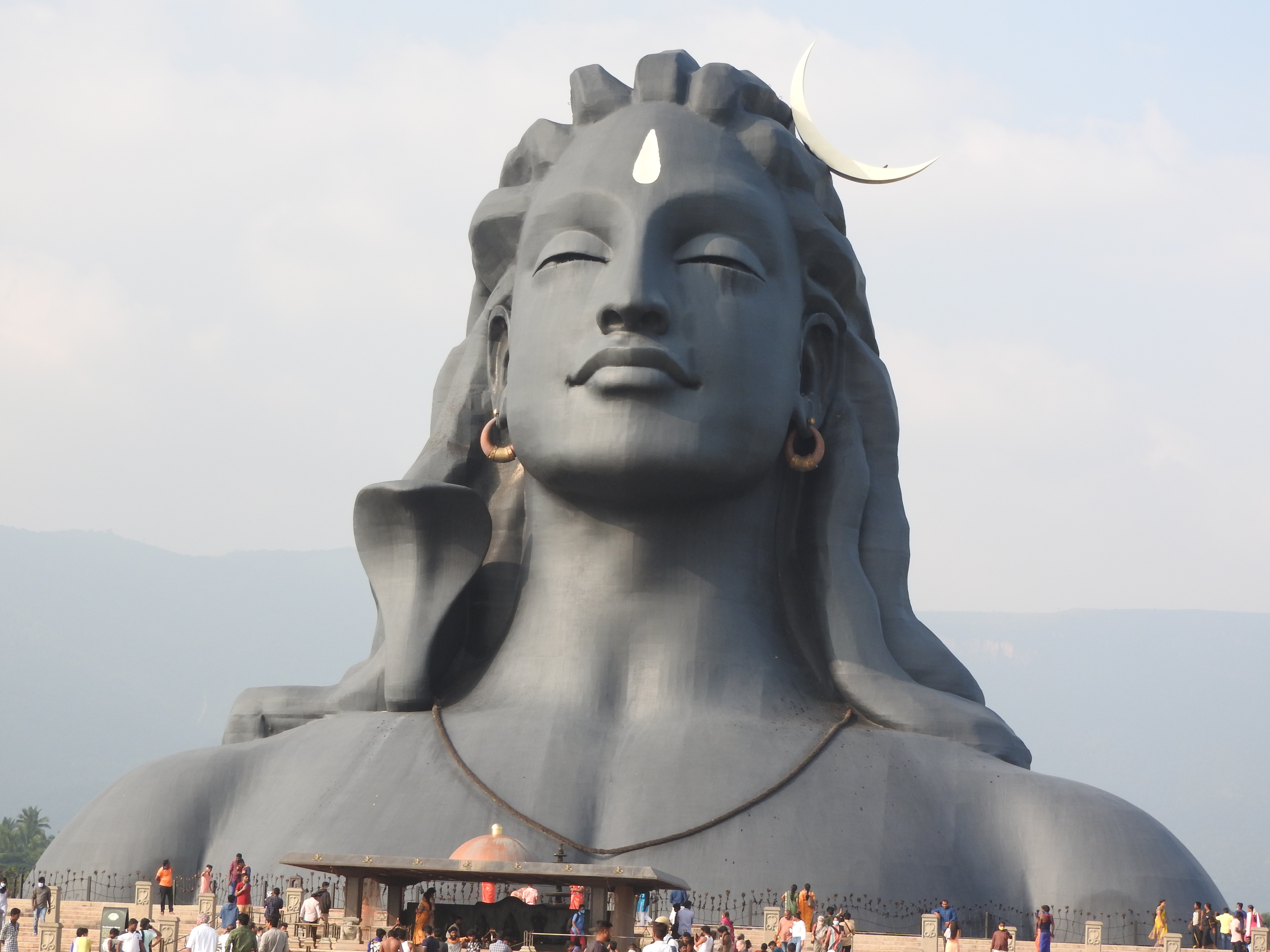
Shiva is worshipped as Adiyogi (the first yogi), the originator of yoga and the lord of yogis, in Shaivism and broader Hinduism.

Some trace the origins to the Indus Valley Civilisation, which reached its peak around 2500–2000 BCE. Archeological discoveries show seals that suggest a deity that somewhat appears like Shiva. Of these is the Pashupati seal, which early scholars interpreted as someone seated in a meditating yoga pose surrounded by animals, and with horns. This "Pashupati" (Lord of Animals, Sanskrit paśupati) seal has been interpreted by these scholars as a prototype of Shiva. Gavin Flood characterises these views as "speculative", saying that it is not clear from the seal if the figure has three faces, or is seated in a yoga posture, or even that the shape is intended to represent a human figure.

Other scholars state that the Indus Valley script remains undeciphered, and the interpretation of the Pashupati seal is uncertain. According to Srinivasan, the proposal that it is proto-Shiva may be a case of projecting "later practices into archeological findings". Similarly, Asko Parpola states that other archaeological finds such as the early Elamite seals dated to 3000–2750 BCE show similar figures and these have been interpreted as "seated bull" and not a yogi, and the bull interpretation is likely more accurate.

=== Vedic elements ===
The Rigveda (~1500–1200 BCE) has the earliest clear mention of Rudra ("Roarer") in its hymns 2.33, 1.43 and 1.114. Flood notes that Rudra is an ambiguous god, peripheral in the Vedic pantheon, possibly indicating non-Vedic origins. The text also includes a Satarudriya, an influential hymn with embedded hundred epithets for Rudra, that is cited in many medieval era Shaiva texts as well as recited in major Shiva temples of Hindus in contemporary times. Yet, the Vedic literature only presents scriptural theology, but does not attest to the existence of Shaivism.

=== Emergence of Shaivism ===
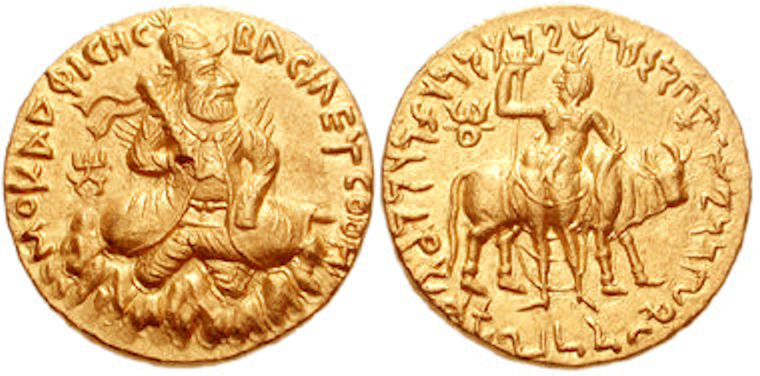
Kushan coin of Vima Kadphises (2nd century CE), with a possible Shiva, holding a trident, in ithyphallic state (Note: The ithyphallic representation of the erect shape connotes the very opposite in this context. It contextualises "seminal retention" and practice of celibacy (illustration of Urdhva Retas), and represents Lakulisha as "he stands for complete complete control of the senses, and for the supreme carnal renunciation".) and next to a bull, his mount, as in Shaivism. The deity was described by the later Kushans in their coinage as "Oesho", a possibly kushan deity.

According to Chakravarti, Shaivism developed as an amalgam of pre-Aryan religions and traditions, Vedic Rudra, and post-Vedic traditions, accommodating phallic, bull and serpent cults, the Dravidian Father God and Mother Goddess concept, and Yoga, puja and bhakti.

According to Gavin Flood, "the formation of Śaiva traditions as we understand them begins to occur during the period from 200 BC to 100 AD." Shiva was originally probably not a Brahmanical god. The pre-Vedic Shiva acquired a growing prominence as its cult assimilated numerous "ruder faiths" and their mythologies, and the Epics and Puranas preserve pre-Vedic myths and legends of these traditions assimilated by the Shiva-cult. Shiva's growing prominence was facilitated by identification with a number of Vedic deities, such as Purusha, Rudra, Agni, Indra, Prajāpati, Vāyu, among others. The earliest evidence for sectarian Rudra-Shiva worship appears with the Pasupata (early CE). The followers of Shiva were gradually accepted into the Brahmanical fold, becoming allowed to recite some of the Vedic hymns.

Patanjali's Mahābhāṣya, dated to the 2nd century BCE, mentions the term Shiva-bhagavata in section 5.2.76. Patanjali, while explaining Panini's rules of grammar, states that this term refers to a devotee clad in animal skins and carrying an ayah sulikah (iron spear, trident lance) as an icon representing his god.

The Shvetashvatara Upanishad mentions terms such as Rudra, Shiva, and Maheshwaram, but its interpretation as a theistic or monistic text of Shaivism is disputed. The dating of the Shvetashvatara is also in dispute, but it is likely a late Upanishad.

The Mahabharata mentions Shaiva ascetics, such as in chapters 4.13 and 13.140. Other evidence that is possibly linked to the importance of Shaivism in ancient times are in epigraphy and numismatics, such as in the form of prominent Shiva-like reliefs on Kushan Empire era gold coins. However, this is controversial, as an alternate hypothesis for these reliefs is based on Zoroastrian Oesho. According to Flood, coins dated to the ancient Greek, Saka and Parthian kings who ruled parts of the Indian subcontinent after the arrival of Alexander the Great also show Shiva iconography; however, this evidence is weak and subject to competing inferences.

In the early centuries of the common era is the first clear evidence of Pāśupata Shaivism. The inscriptions found in the Himalayan region, such as those in the Kathmandu valley of Nepal suggest that Shaivism (particularly Pāśupata) was established in this region by the 5th century, during the late Guptas era. These inscriptions have been dated by modern techniques to between 466 and 645 CE.

=== Puranic Shaivism ===
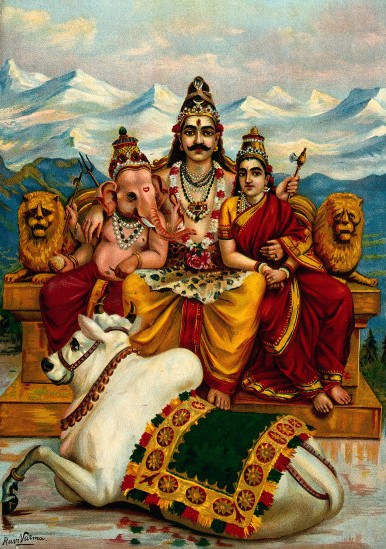
Shiva (middle) is the supreme being of Shaivism, accompanied by his son Ganesha (left) and consort Parvati (right). Painting by Raja Ravi Varma.

During the Gupta Empire (c. 320–500 CE) the genre of Purāṇa literature developed in India, and many of these Puranas contain extensive chapters on Shaivism – along with Vaishnavism, Shaktism, Smarta Traditions of Brahmins and other topics – suggesting the importance of Shaivism by then.

The most important Shaiva Purāṇas of this period include the Shiva Purāṇa, the Skanda Purāṇa, and the Linga Purāṇa.

=== Post-Gupta development ===
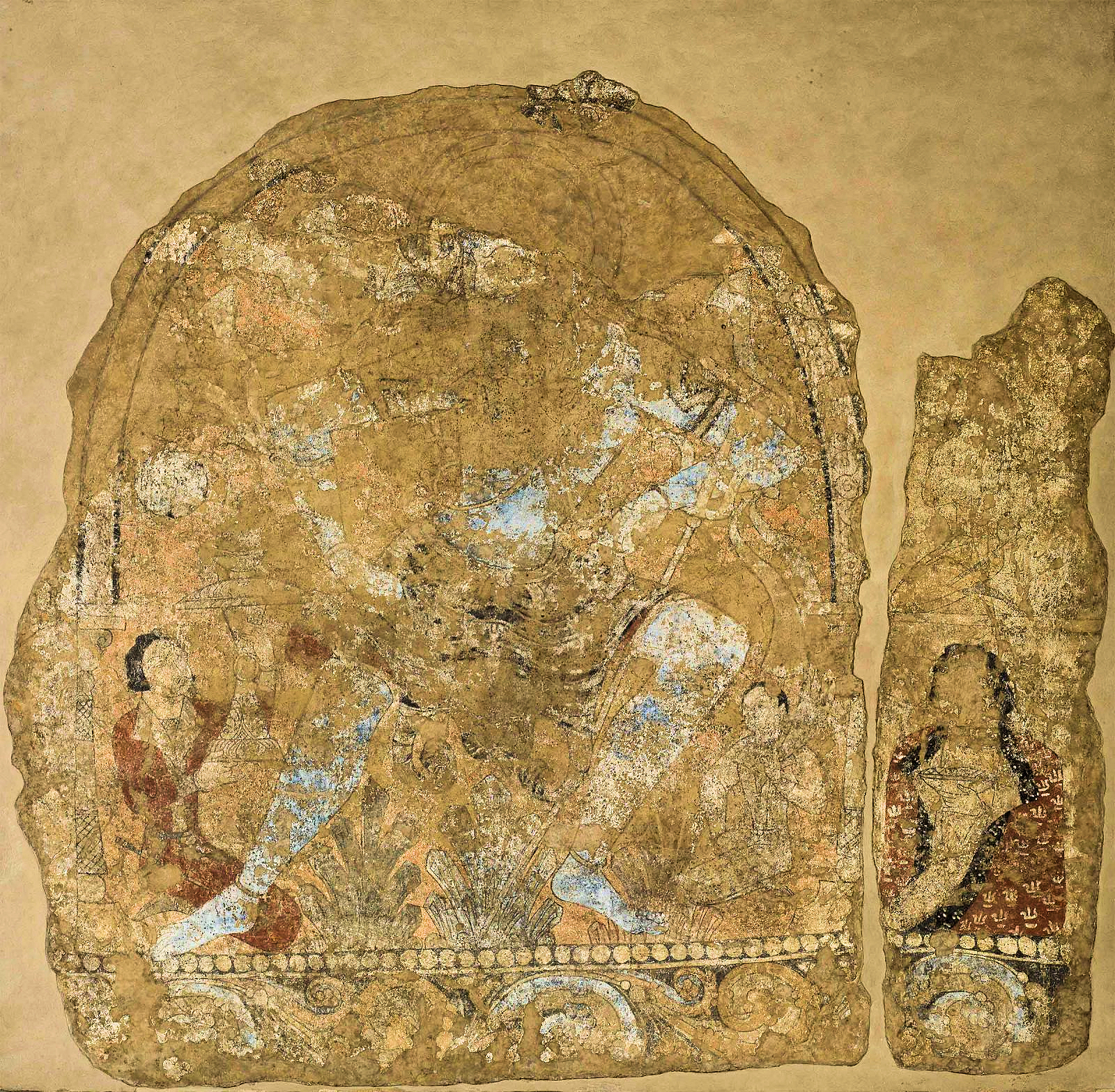
Shiva with Trisula, worshipped in Central Asia. Penjikent, Uzbekistan, 7th–8th century CE. Hermitage Museum.

Most of the Gupta kings, beginning with Chandragupta II (Vikramaditya) (375–413 CE) were known as Parama Bhagavatas or Bhagavata Vaishnavas and had been ardent promoters of Vaishnavism. But following the Huna invasions, especially those of the Alchon Huns circa 500 CE, the Gupta Empire declined and fragmented, ultimately collapsing completely, with the effect of discrediting Vaishnavism, the religion it had been so ardently promoting. The newly arising regional powers in central and northern India, such as the Aulikaras, the Maukharis, the Maitrakas, the Kalacuris or the Vardhanas preferred adopting Shaivism instead, giving a strong impetus to the development of the worship of Shiva. Vaishnavism remained strong mainly in the territories which had not been affected by these events: South India and Kashmir.

In the early 7th century, the Chinese Buddhist pilgrim Xuanzang (Huen Tsang) visited India and wrote a memoir in Chinese that mentions the prevalence of Shiva temples all over North Indian subcontinent, including in the Hindu Kush region such as Nuristan. Between the 5th and 11th century CE, major Shaiva temples had been built in central, southern and eastern regions of the subcontinent, including those at Badami cave temples, Aihole, Elephanta Caves, Ellora Caves (Kailasha, cave 16), Khajuraho, Bhuvaneshwara, Chidambaram, Madurai, and Conjeevaram.

Major scholars of competing Hindu traditions from the second half of the 1st millennium CE, such as Adi Shankara of Advaita Vedanta and Ramanuja of Vaishnavism, mention several Shaiva sects, particularly the four groups: Pashupata, Lakulisha, tantric Shaiva and Kapalika. The description is conflicting, with some texts stating the tantric, puranik and Vedic traditions of Shaivism to be hostile to each other while others suggest them to be amicable sub-traditions. Some texts state that Kapalikas reject the Vedas and are involved in extreme experimentation, (Note: Kapalikas are alleged to smear their body with ashes from the cremation ground, revered the fierce Bhairava form of Shiva, engage in rituals with blood, meat, alcohol, and sexual fluids. However, states David Lorenzen, there is a paucity of primary sources on Kapalikas, and historical information about them is available from fictional works and other traditions who disparage them.) while others state the Shaiva sub-traditions revere the Vedas but are non-Puranik.

=== South India ===
Shiva in the opening verse of the Periyapuranam:

"Omneity is He who is rare to be comprehended And expressed in words by all the worlds; In His crest rest the crescent and the flood; Limitless is His effulgence; He dances in the Ambalam. We hail and adore His ankleted flower-feet."

Shaivism was the predominant tradition in South India, co-existing with Buddhism and Jainism, before the Vaishnava Alvars launched the Bhakti movement in the 7th century, and influential Vedanta scholars such as Ramanuja developed a philosophical and organisational framework that helped Vaishnavism expand. Though both traditions of Hinduism have ancient roots, given their mention in the epics such as the Mahabharata, Shaivism flourished in South India much earlier.

The Mantramarga of Shaivism, according to Alexis Sanderson, provided a template for the later though independent and highly influential Pancaratrika treatises of Vaishnavism. This is evidenced in Hindu texts such as the Isvarasamhita, Padmasamhita, and Paramesvarasamhita.

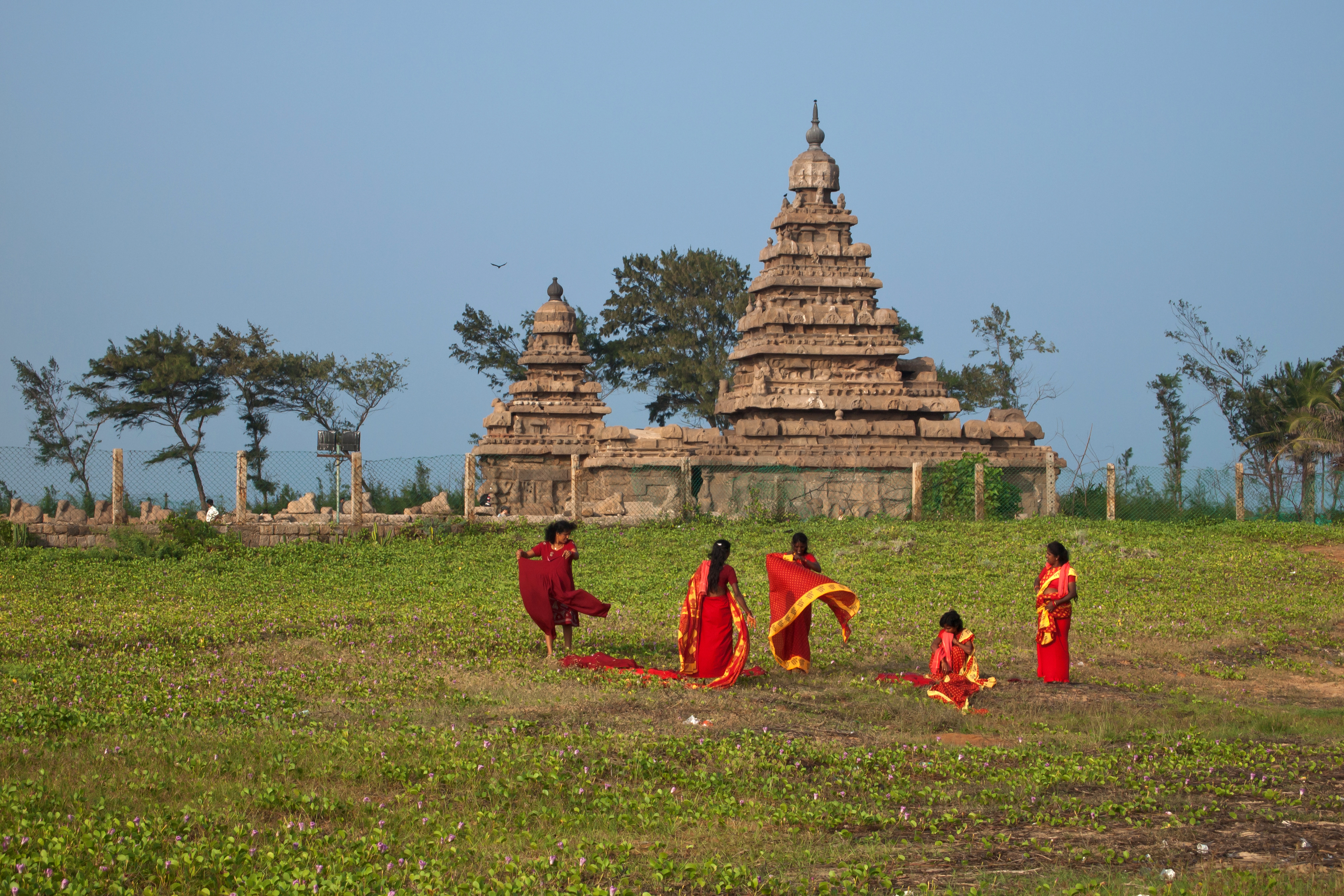
The 7th- to 8th-century Shore Temple at Mahabalipuram is a UNESCO World Heritage site. It features thousands of Shaivism-related sculptures.

Along with the Himalayan region stretching from Kashmir through Nepal, the Shaiva tradition in South India has been one of the largest sources of preserved Shaivism-related manuscripts from ancient and medieval India. The region was also the source of Hindu arts, temple architecture, and merchants who helped spread Shaivism into southeast Asia in early 1st millennium CE.

There are tens of thousands of Hindu temples where Shiva is either the primary deity or reverentially included in anthropomorphic or aniconic form (lingam, or svayambhu). Numerous historic Shaiva temples have survived in Tamil Nadu, Kerala, parts of Andhra Pradesh and Karnataka. Gudimallam is the oldest known lingam and has been dated to between 3rd- to 1st-century BCE. It is a carved five feet high stone lingam with an anthropomorphic image of Shiva on one side. This ancient lingam is in Chittoor district of Andhra Pradesh.

=== Southeast Asia ===
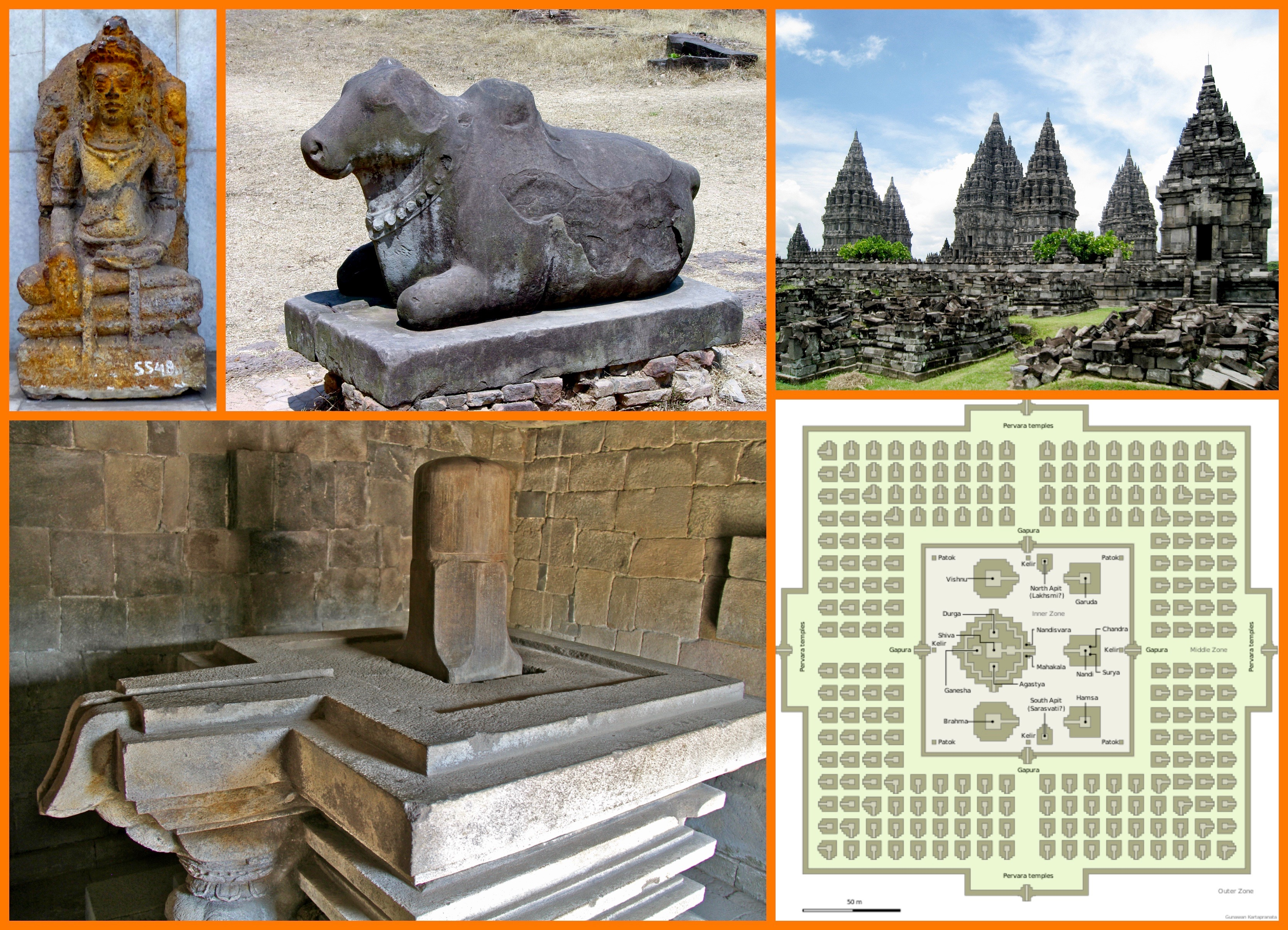
An image collage of 1st millennium CE Shaivism icons and temples from Southeast Asia (top left): Shiva in yoga pose, Nandi, Prambanan temple, Yoni-Linga and Hindu temple layout

Shaivism arrived in a major way in southeast Asia from south India, and to much lesser extent into China and Tibet from the Himalayan region. It co-developed with Buddhism in this region, in many cases. For example, in the Caves of the Thousand Buddhas, a few caves include Shaivism ideas. (Note: The Dunhuang caves in north China built from the 4th century onwards are predominantly about the Buddha, but some caves show the meditating Buddha with Hindu deities such as Shiva, Vishnu, Ganesha and Indra.) The epigraphical and cave arts evidence suggest that Shaiva Mahesvara and Mahayana Buddhism had arrived in Indo-China region in the Funan period, that is in the first half of the 1st millennium CE. In Indonesia, temples at archaeological sites and numerous inscription evidence dated to the early period (400 to 700 CE), suggest that Shiva was the highest god. This co-existence of Shaivism and Buddhism in Java continued through about 1500 CE when both Hinduism and Buddhism were replaced with Islam, and persists today in the province of Bali.

The Shaivist and Buddhist traditions overlapped significantly in southeast Asia, particularly in Indonesia, Cambodia, and Vietnam between the 5th and the 15th century. Shaivism and Shiva held the paramount position in ancient Java, Sumatra, Bali, and neighbouring islands, though the sub-tradition that developed creatively integrated more ancient beliefs that pre-existed. In the centuries that followed, the merchants and monks who arrived in Southeast Asia, brought Shaivism, Vaishnavism and Buddhism, and these developed in to a syncretic, mutually supporting form of traditions.

==== Indonesia ====
In Balinese Hinduism, Dutch ethnographers further subdivided Siwa (shaivaites) Sampradaya" in to five – Kemenuh, Keniten, Mas, Manuba and Petapan. This classification was to accommodate the observed marriage between higher caste Brahmana men with lower caste women.

== Traditions ==
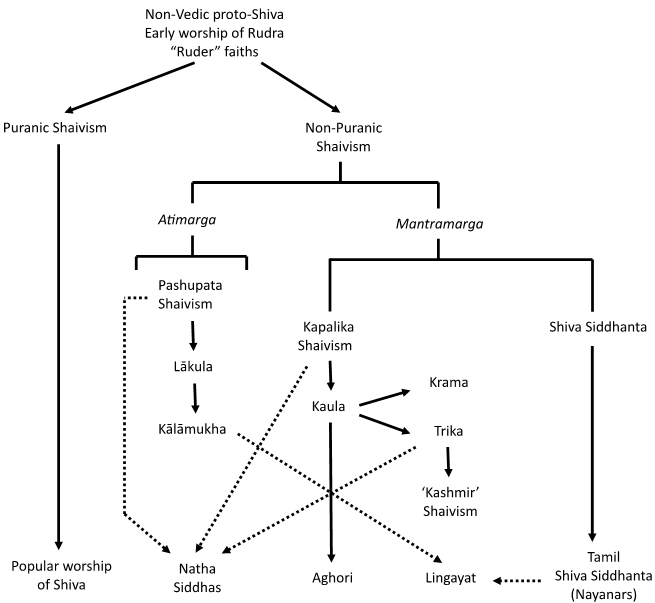
The development of various schools of Shaivism from pre-Vedic Shiva and early worship of Rudra

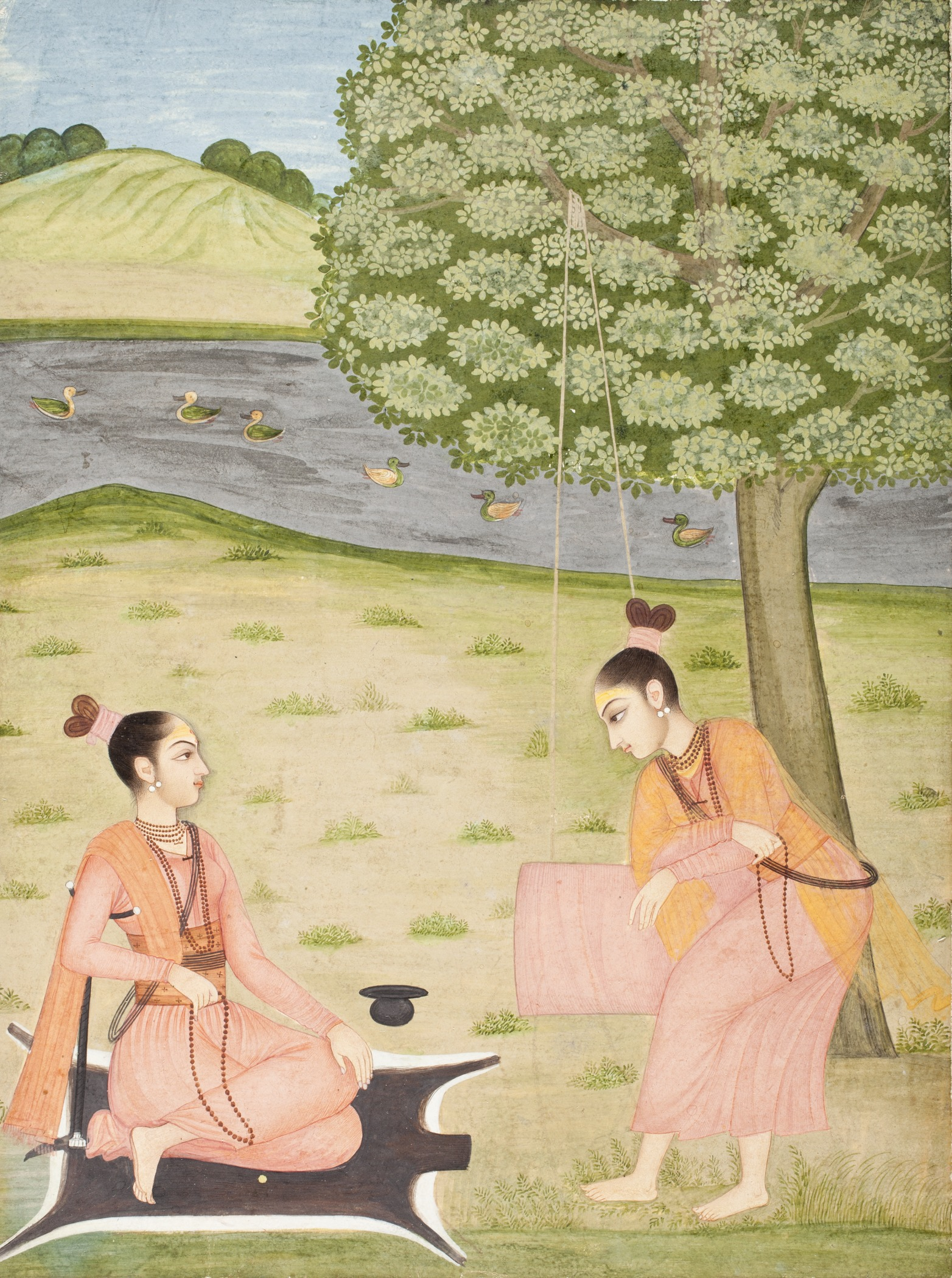
Two female Shaiva ascetics (18th century painting)

Shaivism centres around Shiva, but it has many sub-traditions whose theological beliefs and practices vary significantly. They can be broadly divided in to theistic dualism and nontheistic monism, but there are also combinations of the features or practices of the two.

Shaivism can also be divided in to Vedic, Puranic and non-Puranic (esoteric, tantric) Shaivism. Vedic and Puranic are often grouped together given the significant overlap.

Non-Puranic Shaivism consists of esoteric, minority sub-traditions wherein devotees are initiated (dīkṣa) in to a specific cult they prefer. These are traditionally further divided in to the atimarga or "outer higher path", only accessible for Shaiva sannyasins and the mantramarga, followed by both the renunciates (sannyasi) and householders (grihastha) in Shaivism. The atimarga consists of the Pashupata; the Lakula, a subschool of the Pashupata; and the Kalamukha, a subschool of the Lakula. Lingayatism is related to the Kalamukha, but was also influenced by Siva Siddhanta.

The Nath-tradition is a subgroup of the Siddha tradition, and related to heterodox ascetic Shaivite traditions especially the Kapalika and the Kaula,

=== Vedic-Puranic Shaivism ===
Vedic-Puranic Shaivism is a householder lay religion, followed by the majority within Shaivism. They revere the Vedas and the Puranas and hold beliefs that span from dualistic theism, such as Shiva Bhakti (devotionalism), to monistic non-theism dedicated to yoga and a meditative lifestyle. This sometimes involves renouncing household life for monastic pursuits of spirituality.

In Vedic-Puranic Shaivism, Shiva is also called Mahadeva or Maheshvara and others" synonymously, and most worshipped in the form of the Linga, while temples also feature the bull Nandi, the Trishula (trident), and anthropomorphic statues of Shiva, to help focus practices.

=== Atimarga ===
The Atimarga branch of Shaivism emphasises liberation (salvation) – or the end of all Dukkha – as the primary goal of spiritual pursuits. It was the path for Shaiva ascetics, in contrast to Shaiva householders whose path was described as Mantramarga and who sought both salvation as well as the yogi-siddhi powers and pleasures in life. The Atimarga revered the Vedic sources of Shaivism, and sometimes referred to in ancient Indian texts as Raudra (from Vedic Rudra).

The atimarga sub-traditions include Pashupatas and Lakula.

==== Pashupata ====
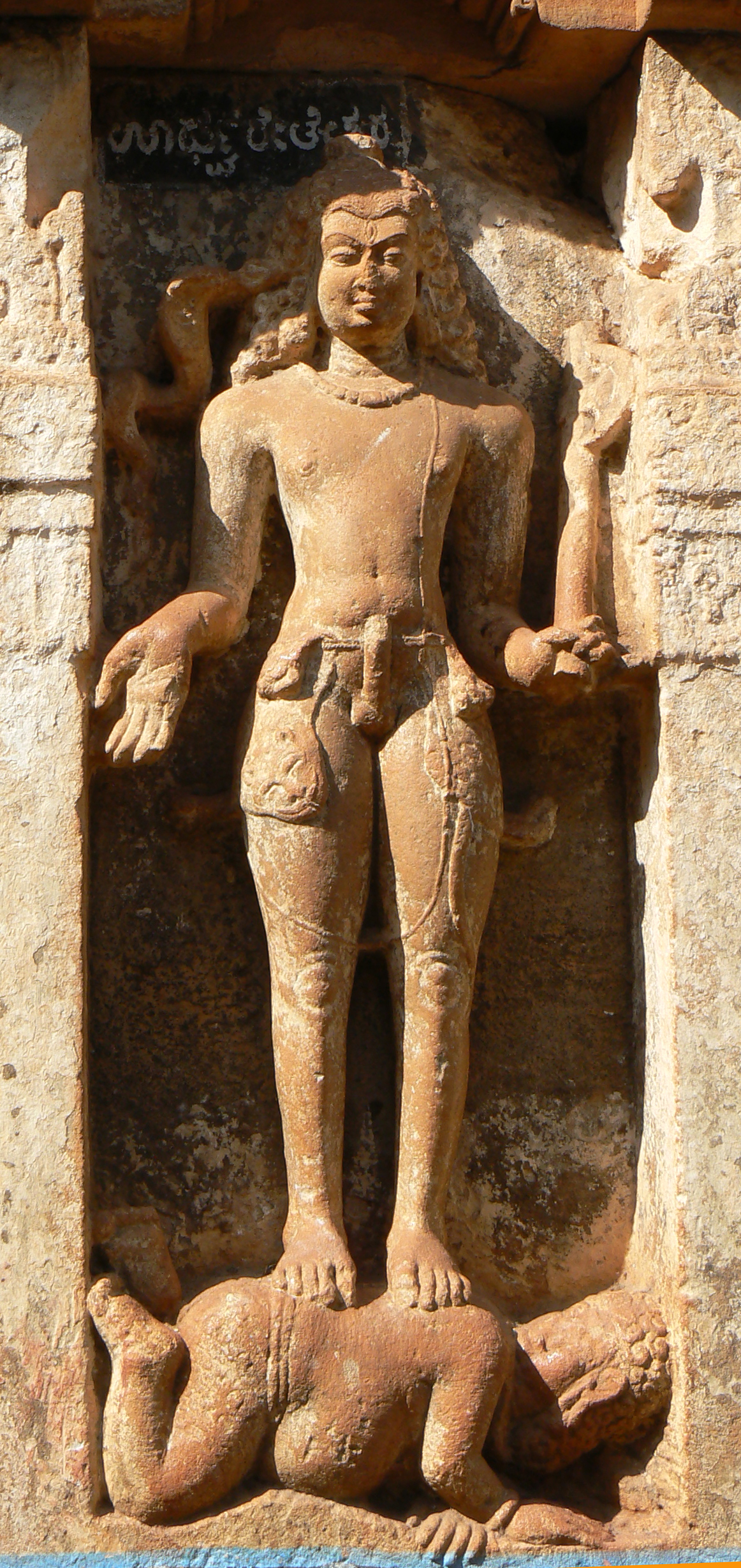
Lakulisha at Sangameshvara Temple at Mahakuta, Karnataka (Chalukya, 7th century CE). His 5th–10th century ithyphallic statues are also found in seated yogi position in Rajasthan, Uttar Pradesh and elsewhere.

Pashupata (IAST: Pāśupatas) are the Shaivite sub-tradition with the oldest heritage, as evidenced by Indian texts dated to around the start of the common era such as the Shanti Parva book of the Mahabharata epic. It is a monist tradition, that considers Shiva to be within oneself, in every being and everything observed. The Pashupata path to liberation is one of asceticism that is traditionally restricted to Brahmin males. (Note: Pashupatas have both Vedic-Puranik and non-Puranik sub-traditions.) Pashupata theology, according to Shiva Sutras, aims for a spiritual state of consciousness where the Pashupata yogi "abides in one's own unfettered nature", where the external rituals feel unnecessary, where every moment and every action becomes an internal vow, a spiritual ritual unto itself.

The Pashupatas derive their Sanskrit name from two words: Pashu (beast) and Pati (lord), where the chaotic and ignorant state, one imprisoned by bondage and assumptions, is conceptualised as the beast, and the Atman (Self, Shiva) that is present eternally everywhere as the Pati. The tradition aims at realising the state of being one with Shiva within and everywhere. It has extensive literature, and a fivefold path of spiritual practice that starts with external practices, evolving in to internal practices and ultimately meditative yoga, with the aim of overcoming all suffering (Dukkha) and reaching the state of bliss (Ananda).

The tradition is attributed to a sage from Gujarat named Lakulisha (~2nd century CE). He is the purported author of the Pashupata-sutra, a foundational text of this tradition. Other texts include the bhasya (commentary) on Pashupata-sutra by Kaudinya, the Gaṇakārikā, Pañchārtha bhāshyadipikā and Rāśikara-bhāshya. The Pashupatha monastic path was available to anyone of any age, but it required renunciation from four Ashrama (stage) into the fifth stage of Siddha-Ashrama. The path started as a life near a Shiva temple and silent meditation, then a stage when the ascetic left the temple and did karma exchange (be cursed by others, but never curse back). He then moved to the third stage of life where he lived like a loner in a cave or abandoned places or Himalayan mountains, and towards the end of his life he moved to a cremation ground, surviving on little, peacefully awaiting his death.

The Pashupatas have been particularly prominent in Gujarat, Rajasthan, Kashmir and Nepal. The community is found in many parts of the Indian subcontinent. In the late medieval era, Pashupatas Shaiva ascetics became extinct.

The tantric sub-tradition in this category is traceable to post-8th to post-11th century depending on the region of Indian subcontinent, paralleling the development of Buddhist and Jain tantra traditions in this period.

==== Lakula ====
The lakula developed from the Pashupatas. Their fundamental text too was the Pashupata Sutras. They differed from Pashupata in that they departed radically from the Vedic teachings, respected no Vedic or social customs. He would walk around, for example, almost naked, drank liquor in public, and used a human skull as his begging bowl for food. The Lakula Shaiva ascetic recognised no act nor words as forbidden, he freely did whatever he felt like, much like the classical depiction of his deity Rudra in ancient Hindu texts. However, according to Alexis Sanderson, the Lakula ascetic was strictly celibate and did not engage in sex.

Secondary literature, such as those written by Kashmiri Ksemaraja, suggest that the Lakula had their canons on theology, rituals and literature on pramanas (epistemology). However, their primary texts are believed to be lost, and have not survived in to the modern era.

=== Mantramarga ===
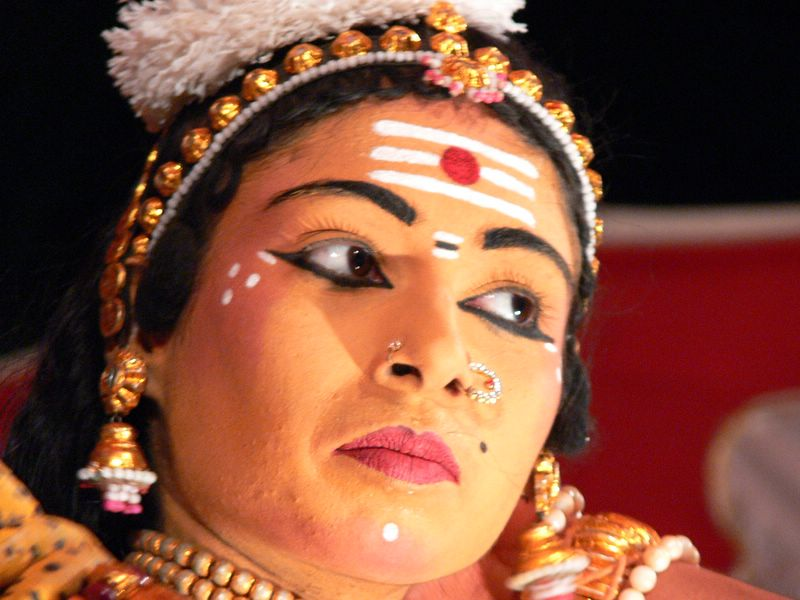
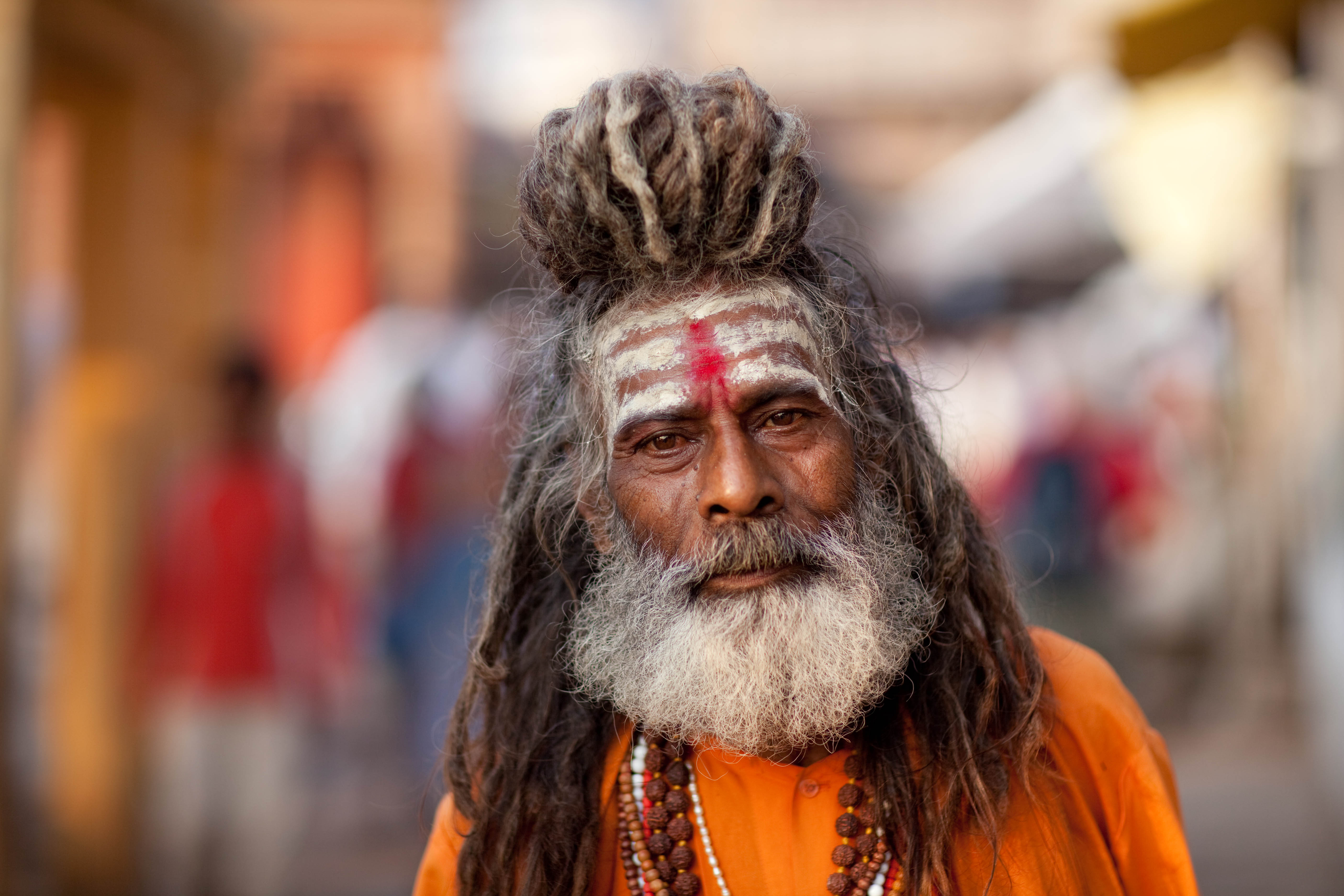
The horizontal three ash lines (Tripundra) with a red mark on forehead is a revered mark across Shaiva traditions symbolising Om.

"Mantramārga" (Sanskrit: मंत्रमार्ग, "the path of mantras") has been the Shaiva tradition for both householders and monks. It grew from the Atimarga tradition. This tradition sought not just liberation from Dukkha (suffering, unsatisfactoriness), but special powers (siddhi) and pleasures (bhoga), both in this life and next. The siddhi were particularly the pursuit of Mantramarga monks, and it is this sub-tradition that experimented with a great diversity of rites, deities, rituals, yogic techniques and mantras. These sub-traditions cherish secrecy, special symbolic formulae, initiation by a teacher and the pursuit of siddhi (special powers). Some of these traditions also incorporate theistic ideas, elaborate geometric yantra with embedded spiritual meaning, mantras and rituals.

Mantramārga grew to become a dominant form of Shaivism in this period. It also spread outside of India into Southeast Asia's Khmer Empire, Java, Bali and Cham.

The Mantramarga tradition created the Shaiva Agamas and Shaiva tantra (technique) texts. This literature presented new forms of ritual, yoga and mantra. This literature was highly influential not just to Shaivism, but to all traditions of Hinduism, as well as to Buddhism and Jainism. Mantramarga had both theistic and monistic themes, which co-evolved and influenced each other. The tantra texts reflect this, where the collection contains both dualistic and non-dualistic theologies. The theism in the tantra texts parallel those found in Vaishnavism and Shaktism. Shaiva Siddhanta is a major sub-tradition that emphasised dualism during much of its history.

Shaivism has had strong nondualistic (advaita) sub-traditions. Its central premise has been that the Atman (Self) of every being is identical to Shiva, its various practices and pursuits directed at understanding and being one with the Shiva within. This monism is close but differs somewhat from the monism found in Advaita Vedanta of Adi Shankara. Unlike Shankara's Advaita, Shaivism monist schools consider Maya as Shakti, or energy and creative primordial power that explains and propels the existential diversity.

Srikantha, influenced by Ramanuja, formulated Shaiva Vishishtadvaita. In this theology, Atman (Self) is not identical with Brahman, but shares with the Supreme all its qualities. Appayya Dikshita (1520–1592), an Advaita scholar, proposed pure monism, and his ideas influenced Shaiva in the Karnataka region. His Shaiva Advaita doctrine is inscribed on the walls of Kalakanthesvara temple in Adaiyappalam (Tiruvannamalai district).

==== Shaiva Siddhanta ====
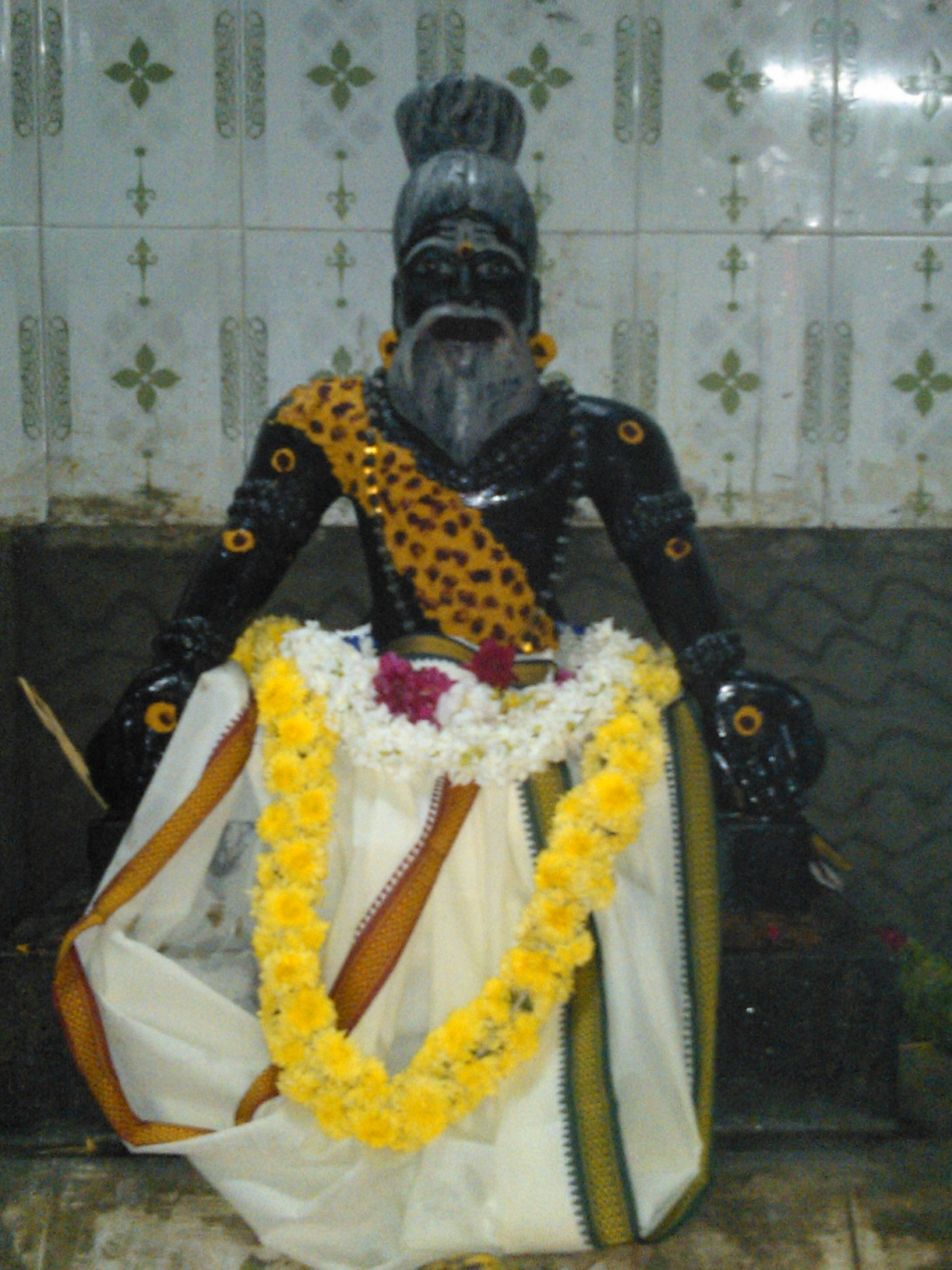
Tirumular, the great Tamil Śaivasiddhānta poet and mystic saint (siddha)

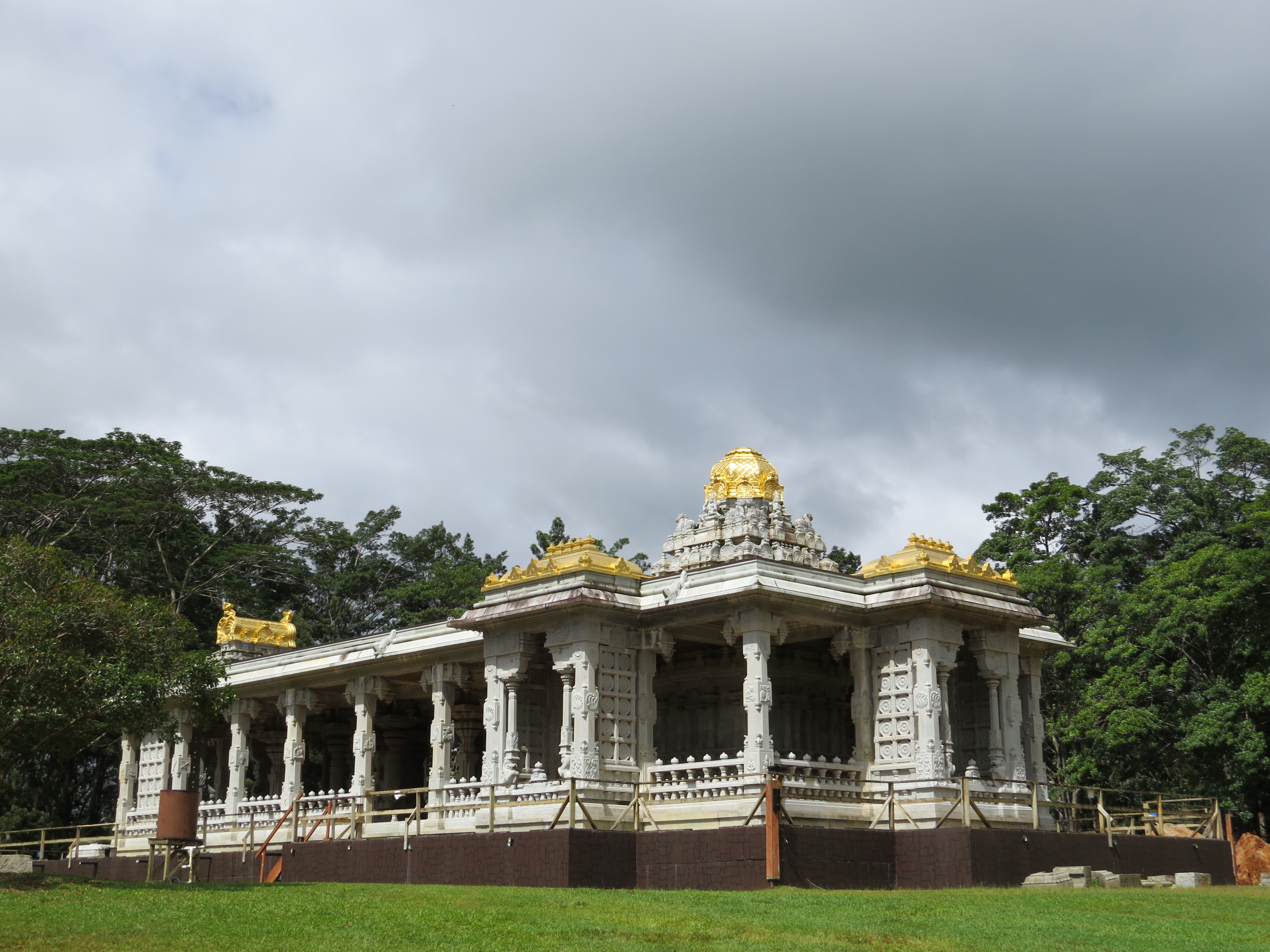
Kauai Hindu monastery on Kauaʻi Island in Hawaii is the only Hindu monastery (Shaivaite) in the United States.

The Śaivasiddhānta ("the established doctrine of Shiva") is the earliest sampradaya (tradition, lineage) of Tantric Shaivism, dating from the 5th century. The tradition emphasises loving devotion to Shiva, uses 5th- to 9th-century Tamil hymns called Tirumurai. A key philosophical text of this sub-tradition was composed by 13th-century Meykandar. This theology presents three universal realities: the pashu (individual Self), the pati (lord, Shiva), and the pasha (Self's bondage) through ignorance, karma and maya. The tradition teaches ethical living, service to the community and through one's work, loving worship, yoga practice and discipline, continuous learning and self-knowledge as means for liberating the individual Self from bondage.

The tradition may have originated in Kashmir where it developed a sophisticated theology propagated by theologians Sadyojoti, Bhaṭṭa Nārāyaṇakaṇṭha and his son Bhaṭṭa Rāmakaṇṭha (c. 950–1000). However, after the arrival of Islamic rulers in north India, it thrived in the south. The philosophy of Shaiva Siddhanta, is particularly popular in south India, Sri Lanka, Malaysia and Singapore.

The historic Shaiva Siddhanta literature is an enormous body of texts. The tradition includes both Shiva and Shakti (goddess), but with a growing emphasis on metaphysical abstraction. Unlike the experimenters of Atimarga tradition and other sub-traditions of Mantramarga, states Sanderson, the Shaiva Siddhanta tradition had no ritual offering or consumption of "alcoholic drinks, blood or meat". Their practices focussed on abstract ideas of spirituality, worship and loving devotion to Shiva as SadaShiva, and taught the authority of the Vedas and Shaiva Agamas. This tradition diversified in its ideas over time, with some of its scholars integrating a non-dualistic theology.

===== Tamil Shiva Siddhanta - Nayanars =====
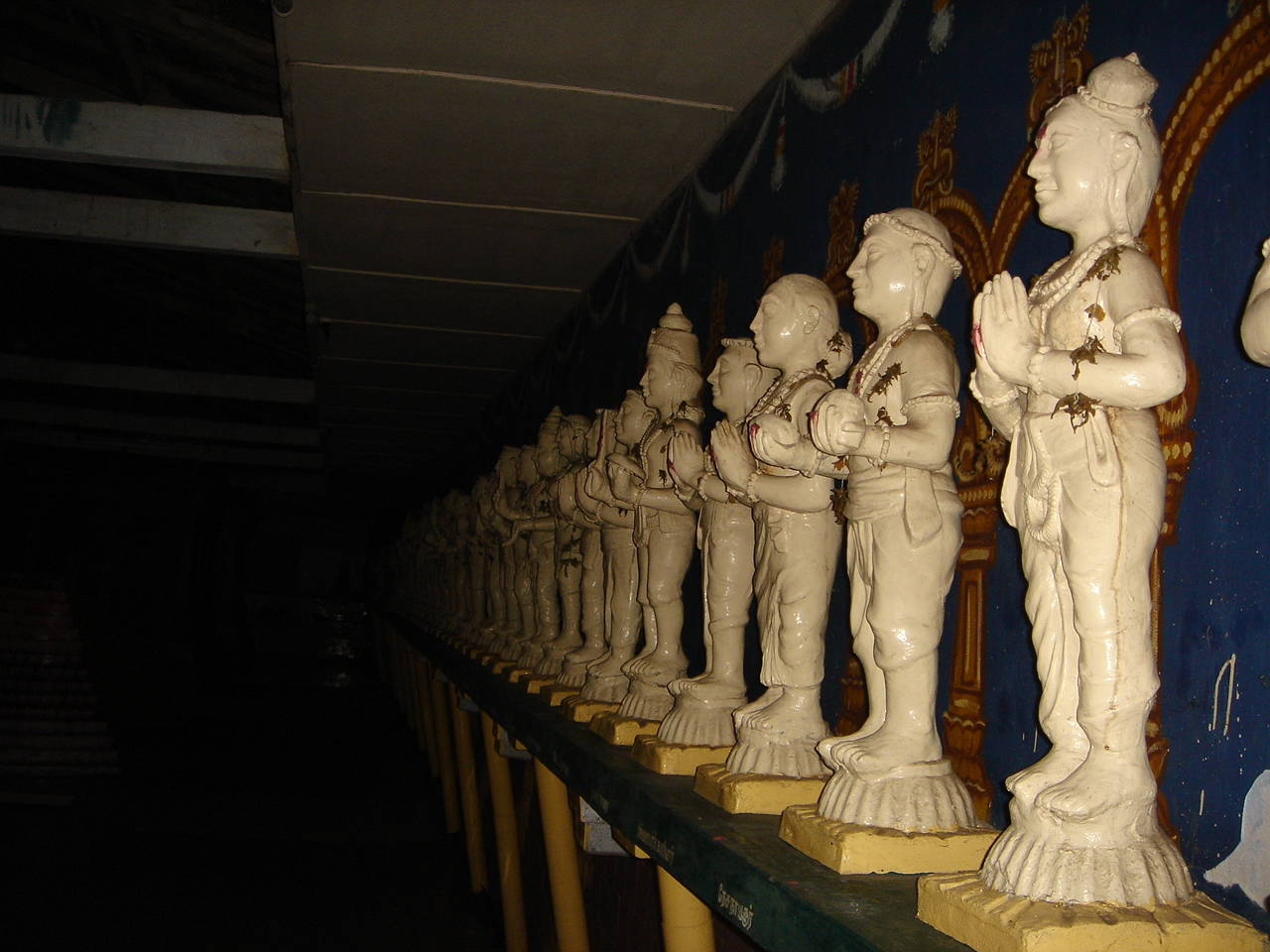
Nayanars Shaiva poet-saints are credited with Bhakti movement in Shaivism. It included three women saints, such as the 6th-century Karaikkal Ammaiyar.

By the 7th century, the Nayanars, a tradition of poet-saints in the bhakti tradition developed in ancient Tamilakam with a focus on Shiva, comparable to that of the Vaisnava Alvars. The devotional Tamil poems of the Nayanars are divided in to eleven collections together known as Tirumurai, along with a Tamil Purana called the Periya Puranam. The first seven collections are known as the Tevaram and are regarded by Tamils as equivalent to the Vedas. (Note: For eleven collections, with the first seven (the Thevaram) regarded as Vedic, see: Tattwananda (1984, p. 55).) They were composed in the 7th century by Sambandar, Appar, and Sundarar.

Tirumular (also spelled Tirumūlār or Tirumūlar), the author of the Tirumantiram (also spelled Tirumandiram) is considered by Tattwananda to be the earliest exponent of Shaivism in Tamil areas. Tirumular is dated as 7th or 8th century by Maurice Winternitz. The Tirumantiram is a primary source for the system of Shaiva Siddhanta, being the tenth book of its canon. (Note: For the Tirumantiram as the tenth book of the Shaiva Siddhanta canon see Brooks, Douglas Renfrew. "Auspicious Fragments and Uncertain Wisdom", in: Harper and Brown, p. 63.) The Tiruvacakam by Manikkavacagar is an important collection of hymns.

==== Kapalika ====
The Kāpālika (Sanskrit : कापालिक) tradition was a Tantric, non-Puranic form of Shaivism which originated in medieval India between the 4th and 8th century CE. The word is derived from the Sanskrit term kapāla, meaning "skull", and kāpālika can be translated as the "skull-men" or "skull-bearers".

Today, the Kāpālika tradition survives within its Shaivite offshoots: the Aghorī order, Kaulā, and Trika traditions.

In later Hatha Yoga, the Kaula visualization of kundalini rising through a system of chakras is overlaid onto the earlier bindu-oriented system.

===== Aghori =====
The Aghori (from Sanskrit: अघोर, lit. 'not dreadful', 'dreadless', IAST: aghora) are a Hindu monastic order of ascetic Shaivite sadhus based in Uttar Pradesh, India. They are the only surviving sect derived from the Kāpālika tradition, a Tantric, non-Puranic form of Shaivism which originated in Medieval India between the 4th and 8th century CE.

Similarly to their Shaivite predecessors, Aghoris usually engage in post-mortem rituals, often dwell in charnel grounds, smear cremation ashes on their bodies, and use bones from human corpses for crafting kapāla (skull cups which Shiva and other Hindu deities are often iconically depicted holding or using) and jewellery. They also practice post-mortem cannibalism, eating flesh from foraged human corpses, including those taken from cremation ghats.

Their practices are sometimes considered contradictory to orthodox Hinduism. Many Aghori gurus command great reverence from rural populations and are widely referred to in medieval and modern works of Indian literature, as they are supposed to possess healing powers gained through their intensely eremitic rites and practices of renunciation and tápasya.

===== Kulamārga =====
The Kāpālika tradition gave rise to the Kulamārga, a subsect of Tantric Shaivism which preserves some of the distinctive features of the Kāpālika tradition. Kaula developed in to four main systems, known as the Four Transmissions, namely eastern (Pūrvāmnāya; Trika-tradition, which developed into Kashmir Shaivism; goddess Kuleshvari), northern (Uttarāmnāya; Mata and Krama tradition; goddess Kali), western (Paścimāmnāya; goddess Kubjika), and southern (Daksinamnaya; goddess Tripurasundari). (Note: Sanderson (2012–2013, p. 58): "...liturgical systems differentiated most obviously by the identity of the central deity. Thus in an early classification, seen in the Ciñciṇīmata, we are given accounts of four systems of Kaula teaching, called the Āmnāyas (‘Traditions’), assigned to the four directions, east (Pūrvāmnāya), north (Uttarāmnāya), west (Paścimāmnāya), and south (Dakṣiṇāmnāya), each with a distinctive pantheon of worship.")

===== Trika and Kashmir Shaivism =====
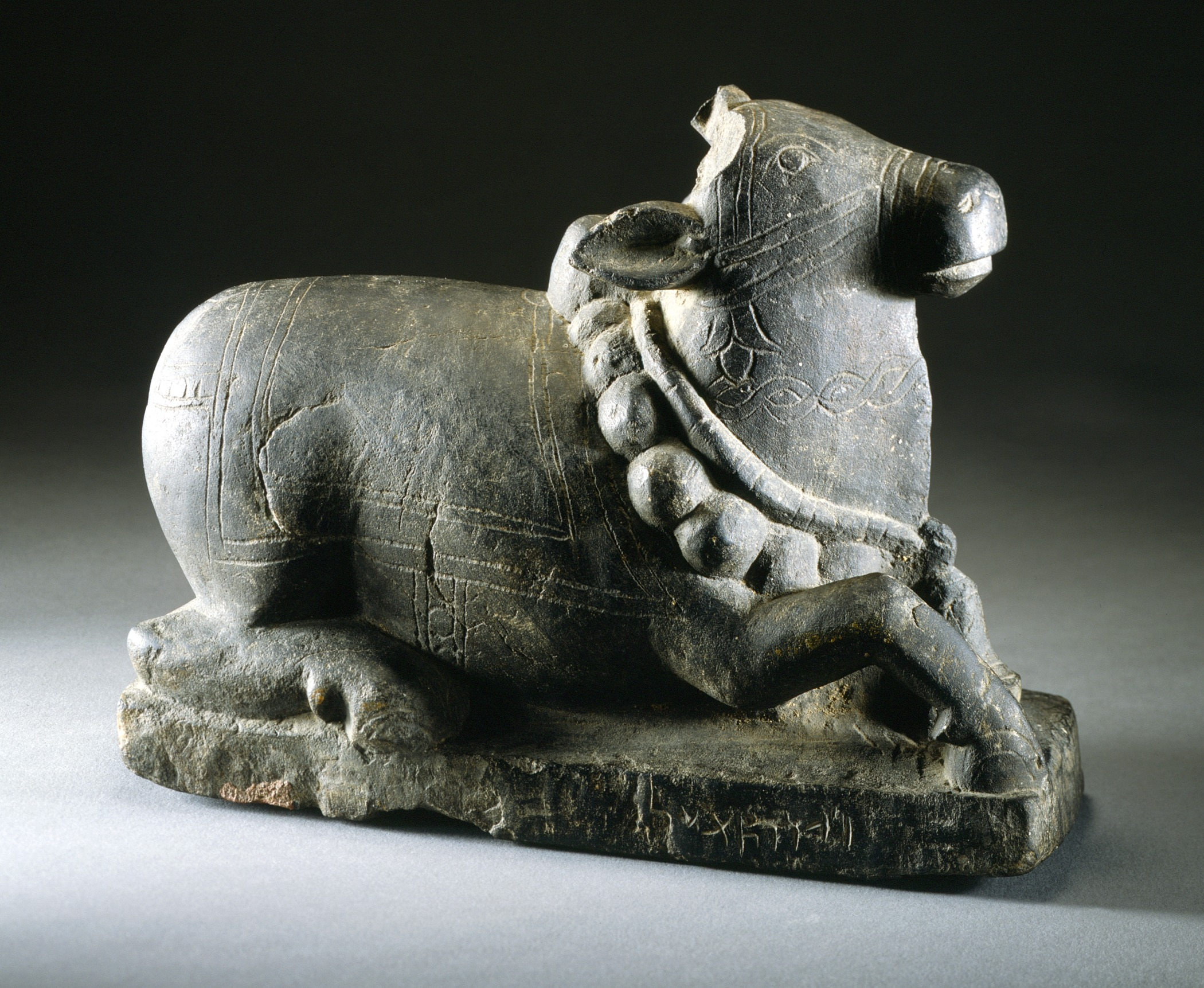
A 3rd century CE Nandi statue from Kashmir

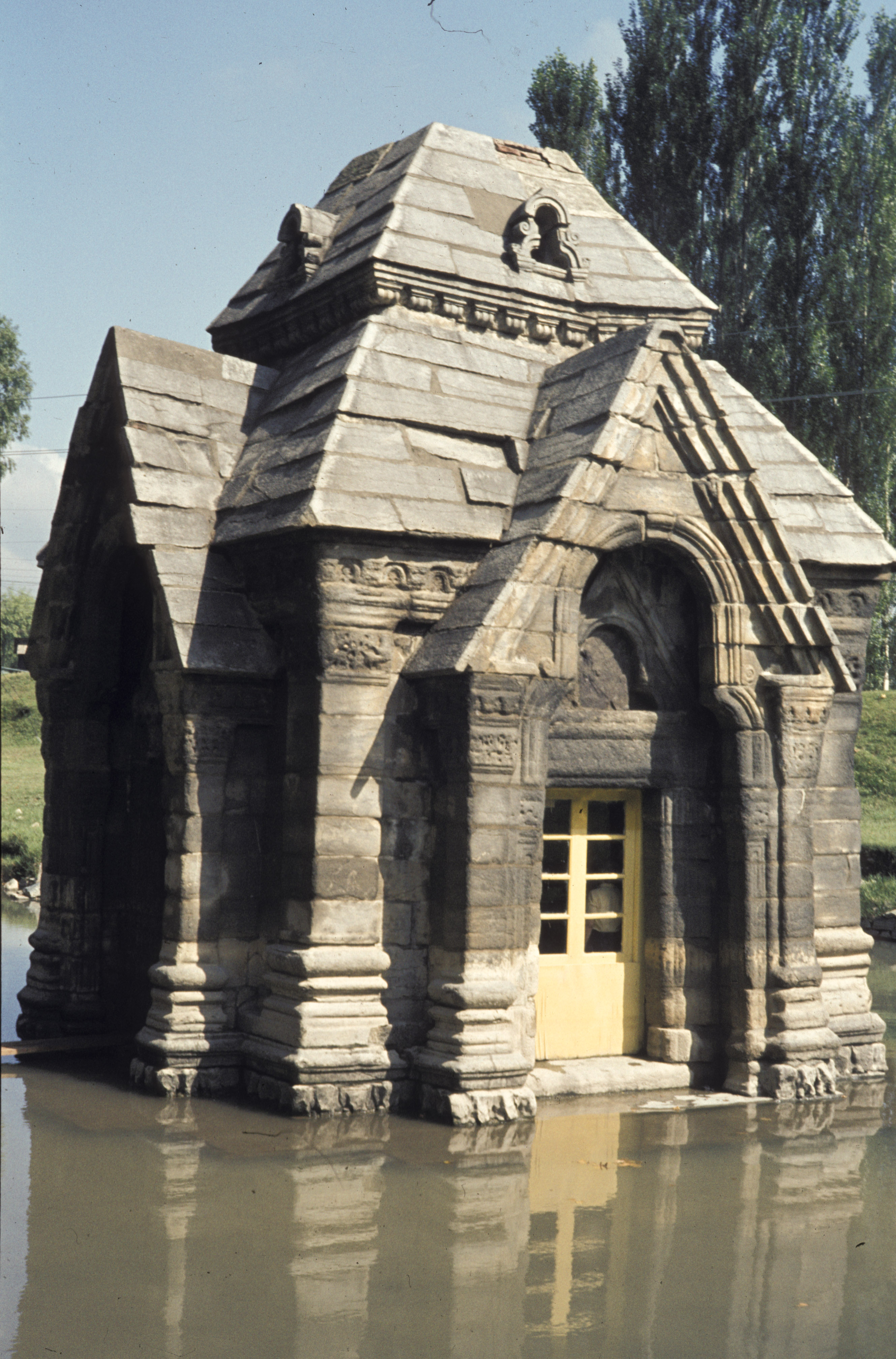
c. 8th–9th century CE Shiva Temple at Pandrethan, Kashmir

Kashmir Shaivism is an influential tradition within Shaivism that developed from the Trika school in Kashmir in the late 1st millennium CE and thrived in early centuries of the 2nd millennium, before the region was subjugated by the Islamic conquests from the Hindu Kush region. (Note: Singh (1989, p. ix–xiv): "After the demise of the Trika as a lineage in Kashmir in the late 13th century, due in large measure to the invasion of Islam, a few rare manuscripts of this important and complex text...") The Kashmir Shaivism traditions contracted due to Islam except for their preservation by Kashmiri Pandits. The tradition experienced a revival in the 20th century due especially to influence of Swami Lakshmanjoo and his students.

Kashmir Shaivism has been a nondual school, and is distinct from the dualistic Shaiva Siddhānta tradition that also existed in medieval Kashmir. The 10th century scholar Utpaladeva and 11th century Abhinavagupta and Kshemaraja, in their exegesis of Tantric scriptures, developed the Pratyabhijna-teaching, 'recognition of the essence, Shiva'. Their extensive texts established the Shaiva theology and philosophy in an advaita (monism) framework. The Siva Sutras of 9th century Vasugupta and his ideas about Spanda have also been influential to this and other Shaiva sub-traditions, but it is probable that much older Shaiva texts once existed.

A notable feature of Kashmir Shaivism was its openness and integration of ideas from Shaktism, Vaishnavism and Vajrayana Buddhism. For example, one sub-tradition of Kashmir Shaivism adopts Goddess worship (Shaktism) by stating that the approach to god Shiva is through goddess Shakti. This tradition combined monistic ideas with tantric practices. Another idea of this school was Trika, or modal triads of Shakti and cosmology as developed by Somananda in the early 10th century.

Nondual (Kashmir Trika) Shaivism emphasises yoga as a practice beyond the ritual obligations, categorizing it in to four upaya: anupaya, the "non-means" or the pathless path; sambhavopaya, related to desire or will, "the sudden upsurge of emotion and instinct that shatters thought construction", which is nirvikalpa, without thought-construction; saktopaya, related to cognition (jnana), "focusing on a pure thought construction (suddhavikalpa) that corresponds to a true state of affairs, such as "I am Siva"; anavopaya, individual means, related to kriya, action, the development of pure thoughts by eans of mantra, meditation on body-parts and the breath, and meditation on external objects.

==== Nath ====
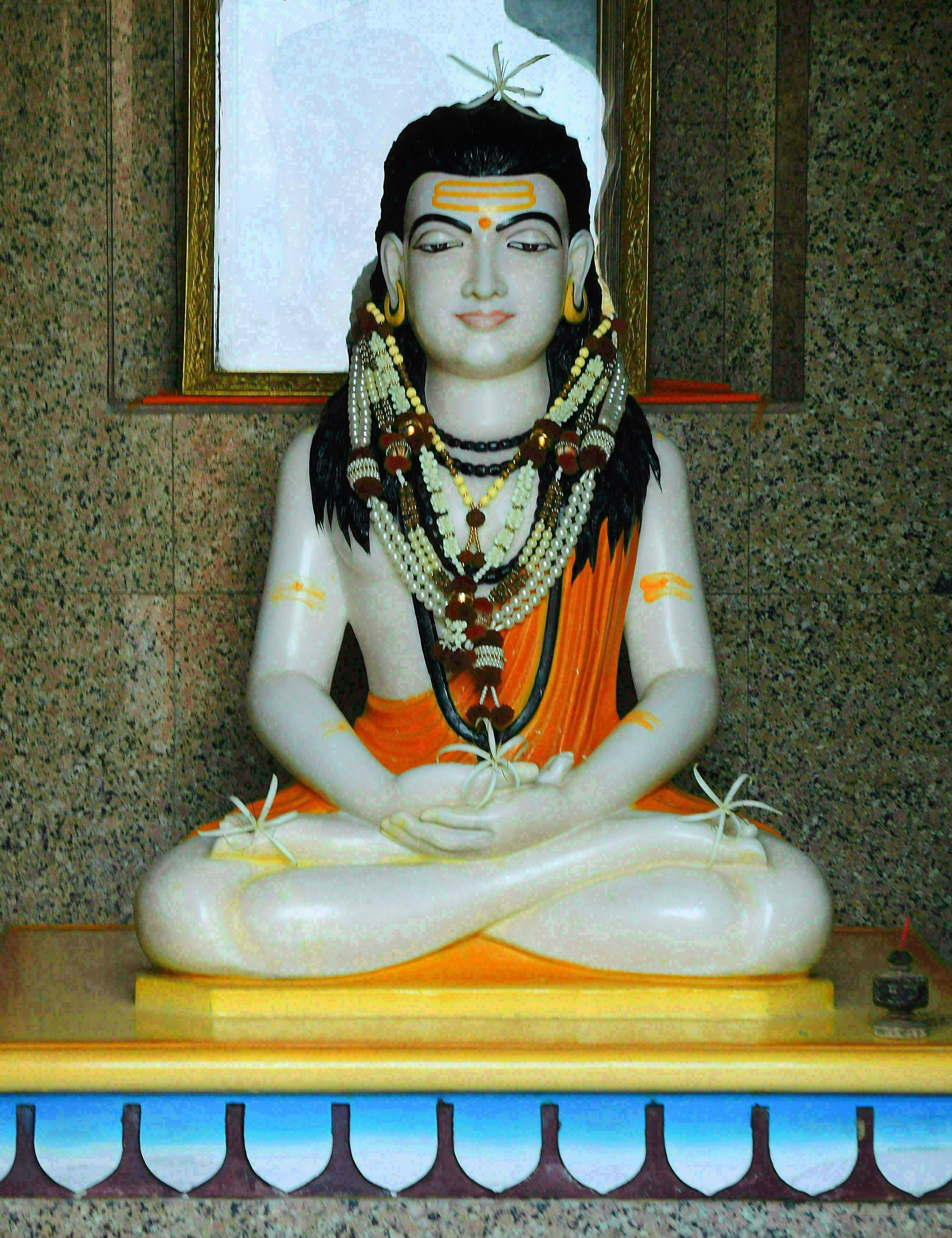
Goraknath founded the Nath Shaiva monastic movement.

Nath is a subgroup of the Siddha tradition, and related to heterodox ascetic Shaivite traditions especially the Kapalika and the Kaula, but also the Pashupata and the Saktas. They emerged as a confederation of Shiva-devotees in the 12th and 13th century.

The Nath consider Shiva as "Adinatha" or the first guru, and it has been a small but notable and influential movement in India whose devotees were called "Yogi" or "Jogi", given their monastic unconventional ways and emphasis on Yoga.

Nath theology integrated elements from Yoga, shaivism, Tantra, Buddhism and Advaita Vedanta. Their unconventional ways challenged all orthodox premises, exploring dark and shunned practices of society as a means to understanding theology and gaining inner powers. The tradition traces itself to 9th or 10th century Matsyendranath and to ideas and organisation developed by Gorakshanath. They combined both theistic practices such as worshipping goddesses and their historic Gurus in temples, as well monistic goals of achieving liberation or jivan-mukti while alive, by reaching the perfect (siddha) state of realising oneness of self and everything with Shiva.

They formed monastic organisations, and some of them metamorphosed in to warrior ascetics to resist persecution during the Islamic rule of the Indian subcontinent.

The Inchegeri Sampradaya, also known as Nimbargi Sampradaya, is a lineage of Hindu Navnath teachers from Maharashtra which was started by Shri Bhausaheb Maharaj. It is inspired by Sant Mat teachers as Namdev, Raidas and Kabir. The Inchegeri Sampraday has become well-known through the popularity of Nisargadatta Maharaj.

=== Lingayatism ===
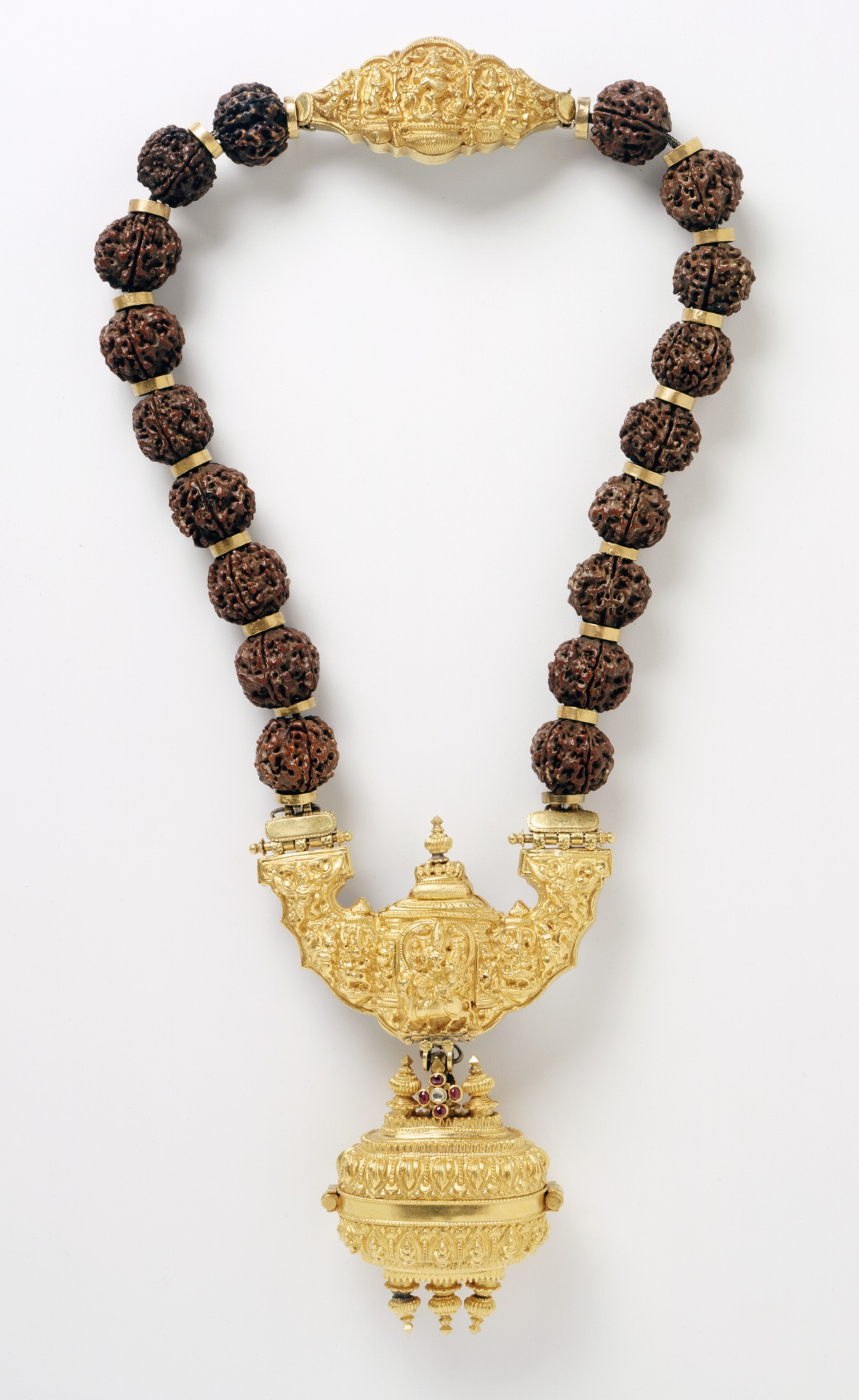
A necklace with pendant containing linga symbol of Shiva are worn by Lingayats

Lingayatism, also known as Veera Shaivism, is a distinct Shaivite religious tradition in India. It was founded by the 12th-century philosopher and statesman Basava and spread by his followers, called Sharanas.

Lingayatism emphasises qualified monism and bhakti (loving devotion) to Shiva, with philosophical foundations similar to those of the 11th–12th-century South Indian philosopher Ramanuja. Its worship is notable for the iconographic form of Ishtalinga, which the adherents wear. Large communities of Lingayats are found in the south Indian state of Karnataka and nearby regions. Lingayatism has its own theological literature with sophisticated theoretical sub-traditions.

They were influential in the Hindu Vijayanagara Empire that reversed the territorial gains of Muslim rulers, after the invasions of the Deccan region first by Delhi Sultanate and later other Sultanates. Lingayats consider their scripture to be Basava Purana, which was completed in 1369 during the reign of Vijayanagara ruler Bukka Raya I. Lingayat (Veerashaiva) thinkers rejected the custodial hold of Brahmins over the Vedas and the shastras, but they did not outright reject the Vedic knowledge. The 13th-century Telugu Virashaiva poet Palkuriki Somanatha, the author of the scripture of Lingayatism, for example asserted, "Virashaivism fully conformed to the Vedas and the shastras."

== Texts ==
Shaiva manuscripts that have survived
(post-8th century)

Nepal and Himalayan region=140,000
South India=8,600
Others (Devanagiri)=2,000
Bali and SE Asia=Many

— Alexis Sanderson, The Saiva Literature

Over its history, Shaivism has been nurtured by numerous texts ranging from scriptures to theological treatises. These include the Vedas and Upanishads, the Agamas, considered superior to the Vedas, and the Bhasya. According to Gavin Flood, Shaiva scholars developed a sophisticated theology, in its diverse traditions. Among the notable and influential commentaries by dvaita (dualistic) theistic Shaivism scholars were the 8th century Sadyojyoti, the 10th century Ramakantha, 11th century Bhojadeva. The dualistic theology was challenged by the numerous scholars of advaita (nondualistic, monistic) Shaivism persuasion such as the 8th/9th century Vasugupta, (Note: Vasugupta is claimed by two Advaita (Monistic) Shaivism sub-traditions to be their spiritual founder.) the 10th century Abhinavagupta and 11th century Kshemaraja, particularly the scholars of the Pratyabhijna, Spanda and Kashmiri Shaivism schools of theologians.

=== Vedas and Principal Upanishads ===
In Shaivism the Agamas are considered to be superior to the Vedas, incorporating the orthodox system as a lower level of understanding. According to Dyczkowski, the Shaivites developed "a corpus of sacred Saiva literature – the Saivagamas – that considered itself to be independent of the authority of the Vedas and had nothing to do with the Epics or Puranas." The surviving Vedic literature can be traced to the 1st millennium BCE and earlier, while the surviving Agamas can be traced to 1st millennium of the common era. According to David Smith, "a key feature of the Tamil Saiva Siddhanta, one might almost say its defining feature, is the claim that its source lies in the Vedas as well as the Agamas, in what it calls the Vedagamas", noting that this claim to Vedic orthodoxy was an attempt to broaden it's appeal, while viewing "the Siddhanta as the essence of the Vedas". This school's view of the Saivagama's as the essence is reflected by Arulnanti, who states that the Agamas contain the essence of the Vedas and Vedanta. Likewise, Umapati states:

The Veda is the cow, the true Agama its milk;
the liturgical Tamil of the Four [Tamil poets]
is the ghee churned therefrom.

The Śvetāśvatara Upanishad (400–200 BCE) is the earliest textual exposition of a systematic philosophy of Shaivism. (Note: For Śvetāśvatara Upanishad as a systematic philosophy of Shaivism see: Chakravarti 1994, p. 9.)

=== Shaiva minor Upanishads ===
Shaivism-inspired scholars authored 14 Shiva-focussed Upanishads that are called the Shaiva Upanishads. These are considered part of 95 minor Upanishads in the Muktikā Upanishadic corpus of Hindu literature. The earliest among these were likely composed in 1st millennium BCE, while the last ones in the late medieval era.

The Shaiva Upanishads present diverse ideas, ranging from bhakti-style theistic dualism themes to a synthesis of Shaiva ideas with Advaitic (nondualism), Yoga, Vaishnava and Shakti themes.

Shaivism Upanishads
Shaiva Upanishad	Composition date	Topics	Reference
Kaivalya Upanishad	1st millennium BCE	Shiva, Atman, Brahman, Sannyasa, Self-knowledge	
Atharvashiras Upanishad	1st millennium BCE	Rudra, Atman, Brahman, Om, monism	
Atharvashikha Upanishad	1st millennium BCE	Shiva, Om, Brahman, chanting, meditation	
Brihajjabala Upanishad	Late medieval, post-12th century	Shiva, sacred ash, prayer beads, Tripundra tilaka	
Kalagni Rudra Upanishad	Unknown	Meaning of Tripundra (three lines tilaka), Ritual Shaivism	
Dakshinamurti Upanishad	Unknown	Dakshinamurti as an aspect of Shiva, Atman, monism	
Sharabha Upanishad	Unknown	Shiva as Sharabha	
Akshamalika Upanishad	Late medieval, post-12th century CE	Rosary, japa, mantras, Om, Shiva, symbolism in Shaivism iconography	
Rudrahridaya Upanishad	Unknown	Rudra-Uma, Male-Female are inseparable, nondualism	
Bhasmajabala Upanishad	Late medieval, post-12th century	Shiva, sacred ash, body art, iconography, why rituals and Varanasi are important	
Rudrakshajabala Upanishad	After the 10th century	Shiva, Bhairava, Rudraksha beads and mantra recitation	
Ganapati Upanishad	16th or 17th century	Ganesha, Shiva, Brahman, Atman, Om, Satcitananda	
Pancabrahma Upanishad	About 7th century CE	Shiva, Sadashiva, nondualism, So'ham, Atman, Brahman, self-knowledge	
Jabali Upanishad	unknown	Shiva, Pashupata theology, significance of ash and body art	

=== Shaiva Agamas ===
The Agama texts of Shaivism are the most important texts of Shaivism. These texts include Shaiva cosmology, epistemology, philosophical doctrines, precepts on meditation and practices, four kinds of yoga, mantras, meanings and manuals for Shaiva temples, and other elements of practice. These canonical texts exist in Sanskrit and in south Indian languages such as Tamil.

The Agamas present a diverse range of philosophies, ranging from theistic dualism to absolute monism. In Shaivism, there are ten dualistic (dvaita) Agama texts, eighteen qualified monism-cum-dualism (bhedabheda) Agama texts and sixty four monism (advaita) Agama texts. The Bhairava Shastras are monistic, while Shiva Shastras are dualistic.

The Agama texts of Shaiva and Vaishnava schools are premised on existence of Atman (Self) and the existence of an Ultimate Reality, Shiva. The texts differ in the relation between the two. Some assert the dualistic philosophy of the individual Self and Ultimate Reality being different, while others state a Oneness between the two. Kashmir Shaiva Agamas posit absolute oneness, that is God (Shiva) is within man, God is within every being, God is present everywhere in the world including all non-living beings, and there is no spiritual difference between life, matter, man and God. While Agamas present diverse theology, in terms of philosophy and spiritual precepts, no Agama that goes against the Vedic literature, states Dhavamony, has been acceptable to the Shaivas.

== Influence ==
Shiva is a pan-Hindu god and Shaivism ideas on Yoga and as the god of performance arts (Nataraja) have been influential on all traditions of Hinduism.

Shaivism was highly influential in southeast Asia from the late 6th century onwards, particularly the Khmer and Cham kingdoms of Indochina, and across the major islands of Indonesia such as Sumatra, Java and Bali. This influence on classical Cambodia, Vietnam and Thailand continued when Mahayana Buddhism arrived with the same Indians.

In Shaivism of Indonesia, the popular name for Shiva has been Bhattara Guru, which is derived from Sanskrit Bhattaraka which means "noble lord". He is conceptualised as a kind spiritual teacher, the first of all Gurus in Indonesian Hindu texts, mirroring the Dakshinamurti aspect of Shiva in the Indian subcontinent. However, the Bhattara Guru has more aspects than the Indian Shiva, as the Indonesian Hindus blended their spirits and heroes with him. Bhattara Guru's wife in southeast Asia is the same Hindu deity Durga, who has been popular since ancient times, and she too has a complex character with benevolent and fierce manifestations, each visualised with different names such as Uma, Sri, Kali and others. Shiva has been called Sadasiva, Paramasiva, Mahadeva in benevolent forms, and Kala, Bhairava, Mahakala in his fierce forms. The Indonesian Hindu texts present the same philosophical diversity of Shaivism traditions found on the subcontinent. However, among the texts that have survived in to the contemporary era, the more common are of those of Shaiva Siddhanta (locally also called Siwa Siddhanta, Sridanta).

As Bhakti movement ideas spread in South India, Shaivite devotionalism became a potent movement in Karnataka and Tamil Nadu. Shaivism was adopted by several ruling Hindu dynasties as the state religion (though other Hindu traditions, Buddhism and Jainism continued in parallel), including the Chola, Nayaks(lingayats) and the Rajputs. A similar trend was witnessed in early medieval Indonesia with the Majapahit empire and pre-Islamic Malaya. In the Himalayan Hindu kingdom of Nepal, Shaivism remained a popular form of Hinduism and co-evolved with Mahayana and Vajrayana Buddhism.

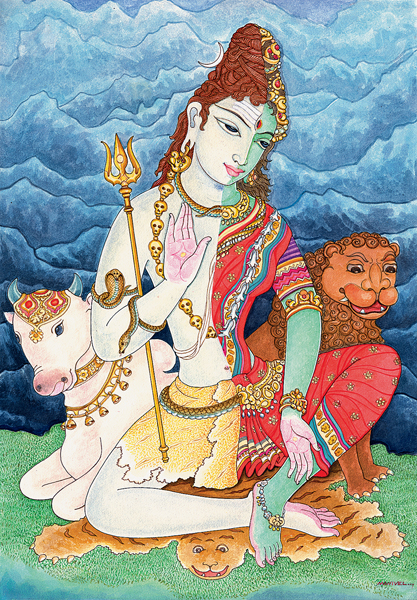
A seated Ardhanarishvara symbolically presenting the feminine Shakti as inseparable part of masculine Shiva

== Relation with other Indian traditions ==
Shaivism sub-traditions subscribe to various philosophies, are similar in some aspects and differ in others. These traditions compare with Vaishnavism, Shaktism and Smartism as follows:

Comparison of Shaivism with other traditions
	Shaiva Traditions	Vaishnava Traditions	Shakta Traditions	Smarta Traditions	References
Scriptural authority	Vedas, Upanishads and Agamas	Vedas, Upanishads and Agamas	Vedas and Upanishads	Vedas and Upanishads	
Supreme deity	Shiva	Vishnu	Devi	None (Considers Parabrahman to be so)	
Creator	Shiva	Vishnu	Devi	Brahman	
Avatar	Minor	Key concept	Significant	Minor	
Monastic life	Recommends	Accepts	Accepts	Recommends	
Rituals, Bhakti	Affirms	Affirms	Affirms	Optional	
Ahimsa and Vegetarianism	Recommends, Optional	Affirms	Optional	Recommends	
Free will, Maya, Karma	Affirms	Affirms	Affirms	Affirms	
Metaphysics	Brahman (Shiva), Atman (Self)	Brahman (Vishnu), Atman	Brahman (Devi), Atman	Brahman, Atman	
Epistemology (Pramana)	1. Perception; 2. Inference; 3. Reliable testimony 4. Self-evident	1. Perception; 2. Inference; 3. Reliable testimony	1. Perception; 2. Inference; 3. Reliable testimony	1. Perception; 2. Inference; 3. Comparison and analogy 4. Postulation, derivation 5. Negative/cognitive proof 6. Reliable testimony	
Philosophy	Dvaita, qualified advaita, advaita	Vishishtadvaita, Dvaita, qualified advaita, advaita	Shakti-advaita	Advaita, qualified advaita	
Liberation (Soteriology)	Jivanmukta, Charya-Kriyā-Yoga-Jnana	Videhamukti, Yoga, champions householder life	Bhakti, Tantra, Yoga	Jivanmukta, Advaita, Yoga, champions monastic life	

=== Shaktism ===
The goddess tradition of Hinduism called Shaktism is closely related to Shaivism. In many regions of India, not only did the ideas of Shaivism influence the evolution of Shaktism, but Shaivism also itself was influenced by it and progressively subsumed the reverence for the divine feminine (Devi) as an equal and essential partner of divine masculine (Shiva). The goddess Shakti in eastern states of India is considered the inseparable partner of God Shiva. According to Galvin Flood, the closeness between Shaivism and Shaktism traditions is such that these traditions of Hinduism are at times difficult to separate. Some Shaiva worship in Shiva and Shakti temples.

=== Smarta Tradition ===
Shiva is a part of the Smarta Tradition, sometimes referred to as Smartism, which is a tradition within Hinduism. The Smartas are associated with the Advaita Vedanta theology, and their practices include the Panchayatana puja, a ritual that incorporates simultaneous reverence for five deities: Shiva, Vishnu, Surya, Devi and Ganesha. The Smartas thus accept the primary deity of Shaivism as a means to their spiritual goals.

Philosophically, the Smarta tradition emphasises that all idols (murti) are icons of saguna Brahman, a means to realising the abstract Ultimate Reality called nirguna Brahman. The five or six icons are seen by Smartas as multiple representations of the one Saguna Brahman (i.e., a personal God with form), rather than as distinct beings. The ultimate goal in this practice is to transition past the use of icons, then follow a philosophical and meditative path to understanding the oneness of Atman (Self) and Brahman (metaphysical Ultimate Reality) – as "That art Thou".

Panchayatana puja that incorporates Shiva became popular in medieval India and is attributed to 8th century Adi Shankara, but archaeological evidence suggests that this practice long predates the birth of Adi Shankara. Many Panchayatana mandalas and temples have been uncovered that are from the Gupta Empire period, and one Panchayatana set from the village of Nand (about 24 kilometres from Ajmer) has been dated to belong to the Kushan Empire era (pre-300 CE). According to James Harle, major Hindu temples from 1st millennium CE commonly embedded the pancayatana architecture, from Odisha to Karnataka to Kashmir. Large temples often present multiple deities in the same temple complex, while some explicitly include dual representations of deities such as Harihara (half Shiva, half Vishnu).

=== Vaishnavism ===
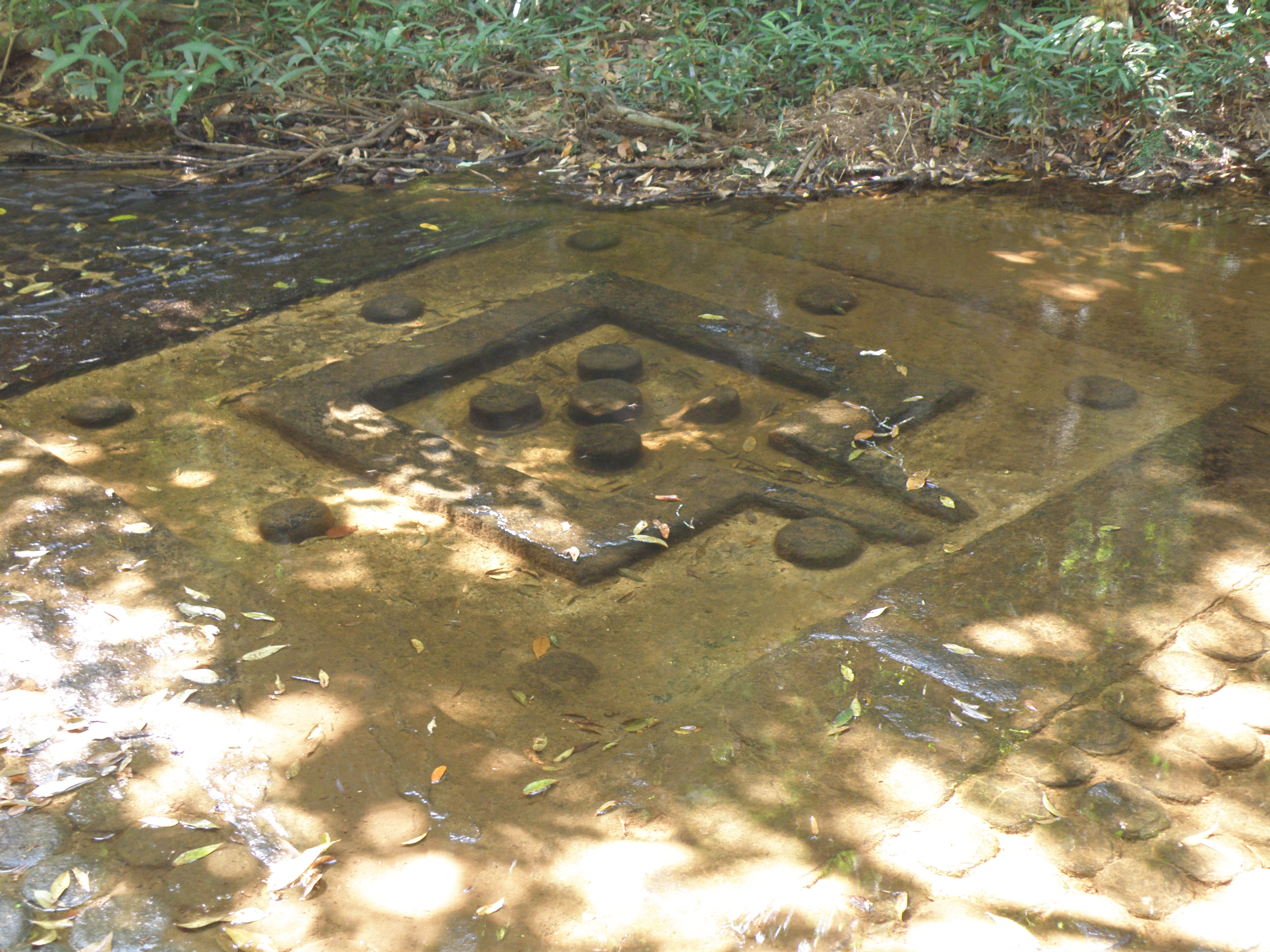
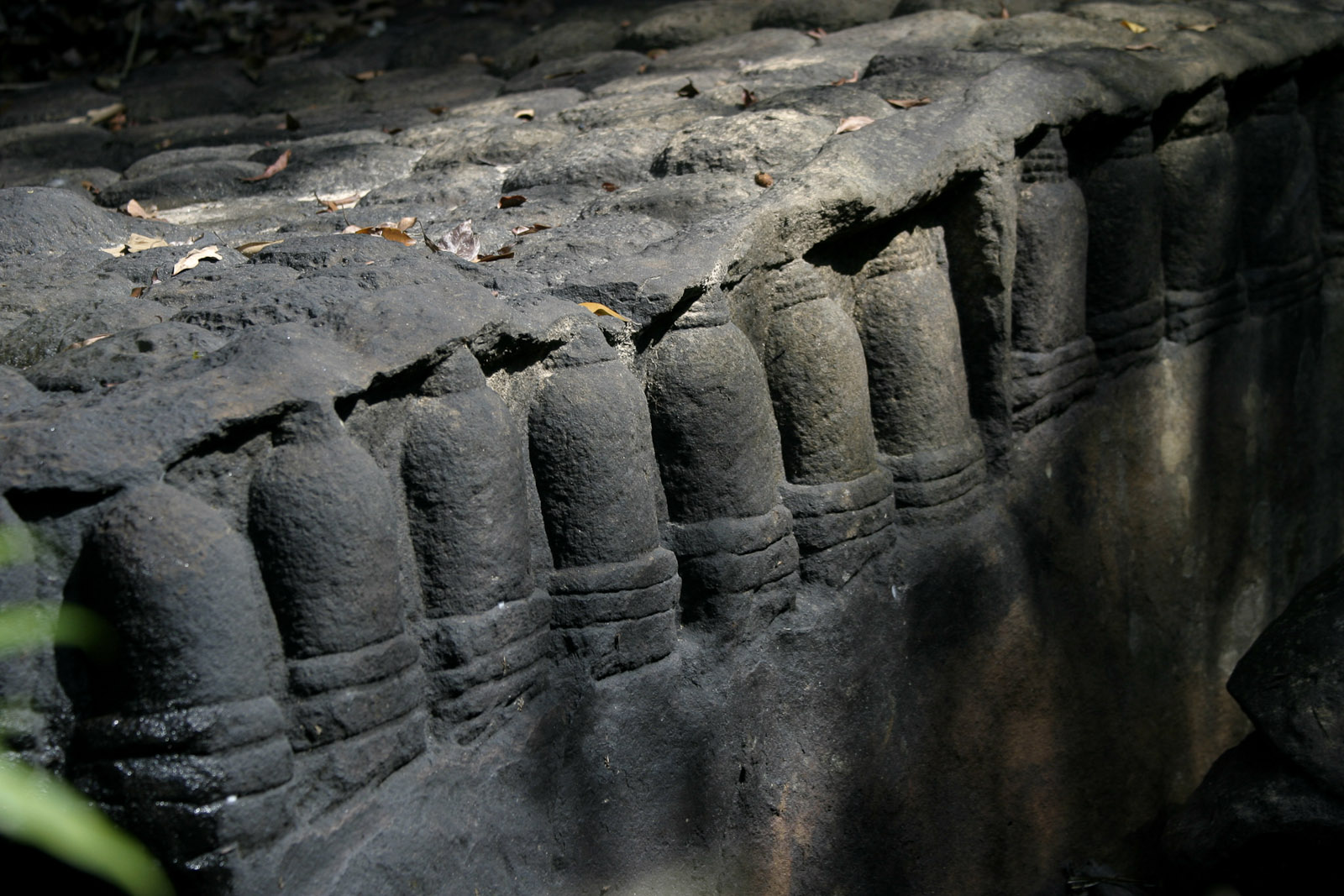
Shaivism iconography in Cambodia, at Kbal Spean river site. As in India, the site also co-features Vaishnavism-related iconography.

Vaishnava texts reverentially mention Shiva. For example, the Vishnu Purana primarily focuses on the theology of Hindu god Vishnu and his avatars such as Krishna, but it praises Brahma and Shiva and asserts that they are one with Vishnu. The Vishnu Sahasranama in the Mahabharata list a thousand attributes and epithets of Vishnu. The list identifies Shiva with Vishnu.

Reverential inclusion of Shaiva ideas and iconography are very common in major Vaishnava temples, such as Dakshinamurti symbolism of Shaiva thought is often enshrined on the southern wall of the main temple of major Vaishnava temples in peninsular India. Harihara temples in and outside the Indian subcontinent have historically combined Shiva and Vishnu, such as at the Lingaraj Mahaprabhu temple in Bhubaneshwar, Odisha. According to Julius Lipner, Vaishnavism traditions such as Sri Vaishnavism embrace Shiva, Ganesha and others, not as distinct deities of polytheism, but as polymorphic manifestation of the same supreme divine principle, providing the devotee a polycentric access to the spiritual.

Similarly, Shaiva traditions have reverentially embraced other gods and goddesses as manifestation of the same divine. The Skanda Purana, for example in section 6.254.100 states, "He who is Shiva is Vishnu, he who is Vishnu is Sadashiva."

=== Sauraism (Sun deity) ===
The sun god called Surya is an ancient deity of Hinduism, and several ancient Hindu kingdoms particularly in the northwest and eastern regions of the Indian subcontinent revered Surya. These devotees called Sauras once had a large corpus of theological texts, and Shaivism literature reverentially acknowledges these. For example, the Shaiva text Srikanthiyasamhita mentions 85 Saura texts, almost all of which are believed to have been lost during the Islamic invasion and rule period, except for large excerpts found embedded in Shaiva manuscripts discovered in the Himalayan mountains. Shaivism incorporated Saura ideas, and the surviving Saura manuscripts such as Saurasamhita acknowledge the influence of Shaivism, according to Alexis Sanderson, assigning "itself to the canon of Shaiva text Vathula-Kalottara.

=== Yoga movements ===
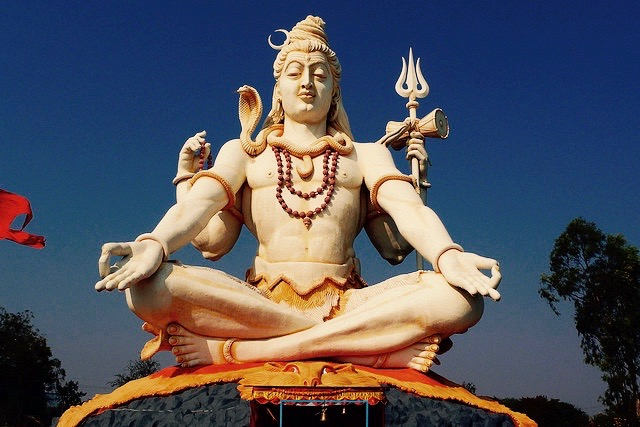
Many Shaiva temples present Shiva in yoga pose.

Yoga and meditation have been an integral part of Shaivism, and it has been a major innovator of techniques such as those of Hatha Yoga. Many major Shiva temples and Shaiva tritha (pilgrimage) centres, as well as Shaiva texts, depict anthropomorphic iconography of Shiva as a giant statue wherein Shiva is a lone yogi meditating.

In several Shaiva traditions such as the Kashmir Shaivism, anyone who seeks personal understanding and spiritual growth has been called a Yogi. The Shiva Sutras (aphorisms) of Shaivism teach yoga in many forms. According to Mark Dyczkowski, yoga – which literally means "to yoke", that is, to control oneself, but is also popularly understood as "union" – to this tradition has meant the "realisation of our true inherent nature which is inherently greater than our thoughts can ever conceive", and that the goal of yoga is to be the "free, eternal, blissful, perfect, infinite spiritually conscious" one is.

Many Yoga-emphasising Shaiva traditions emerged in medieval India, who refined yoga methods in ways such as introducing Hatha Yoga techniques. One such movement had been the Nath Yogis, a Shaivism sub-tradition that integrated "esoteric traditions drawn from Buddhism, Shaivism, and Hatha Yoga", and influenced 18th century Advaita Vedanta. It was founded by Matsyendranath and further developed by Gorakshanath. The texts of these Yoga emphasising Hindu traditions present their ideas in Shaiva context. (Note: For example: [It will] be impossible to accomplish one's functions unless one is a master of oneself. Therefore strive for self-mastery, seeking to win the way upwards. To have self-mastery is to be a yogin (yogitvam). [v. 1–2] [...] Whatever reality he reaches through the Yoga whose sequence I have just explained, he realizes there a state of consciousness whose object is all that pervades. Leaving aside what remains outside he should use his vision to penetrate all [within]. Then once he has transcended all lower realities, he should seek the Shiva level. [v. 51–53] [...] How can a person whose awareness is overwhelmed by sensual experience stabilize his mind? Answer: Shiva did not teach this discipline (sādhanam) for individuals who are not [already] disaffected. [v. 56–57] [...] — Bhatta Narayanakantha, Mrigendratantra (paraphrased), Transl: Alexis Sanderson)

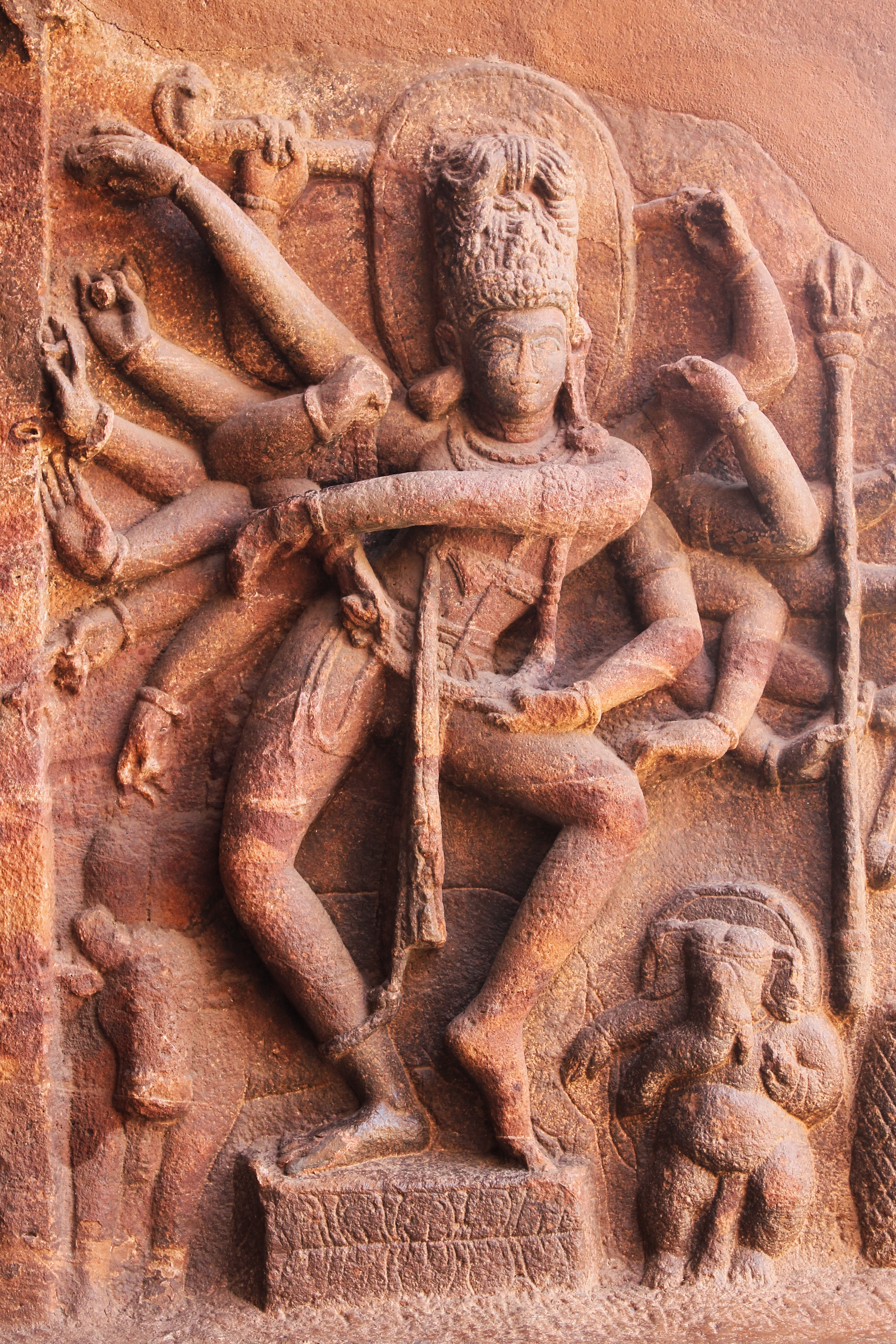
Dancing Shiva Nataraja at the 6th century Badami cave temples

=== Hindu performance arts ===
Shiva is the lord of dance and dramatic arts in Hinduism. This is celebrated in Shaiva temples as Nataraja, which typically shows Shiva dancing in one of the poses in the ancient Hindu text on performance arts called the Natya Shastra.

Dancing Shiva as a metaphor for celebrating life and arts is very common in ancient and medieval Hindu temples. For example, it is found in Badami cave temples, Ellora Caves, Khajuraho, Chidambaram and others. The Shaiva link to the performance arts is celebrated in Indian classical dances such as Bharatanatyam and Chhau.

=== Buddhism ===
Buddhism and Shaivism have interacted and influenced each other since ancient times in South Asia, Southeast Asia, and East Asia. Their Siddhas and esoteric traditions, in particular, have overlapped to an extent where Buddhists and Hindus worshipped in the same temple such as in the Seto Machindranath. In southeast Asia, the two traditions were not presented in competitive or polemical terms, rather as two alternate paths that lead to the same goals of liberation, with theologians disagreeing which of these is faster and simpler. Scholars disagree whether a syncretic tradition emerged from Buddhism and Shaivism, or it was a coalition with free borrowing of ideas, but they agree that the two traditions co-existed peacefully.

The earliest evidence of a close relationship between Shaivism and Buddhism comes from the archaeological sites and damaged sculptures from the northwest Indian subcontinent, such as Gandhara. These are dated to about the 1st-century CE, with Shiva depicted in Buddhist arts. (Note: Some images show proto-Vishnu images.) The Buddhist Avalokiteshvara is linked to Shiva in many of these arts, but in others Shiva is linked to Bodhisattva Maitreya with him shown as carrying his own water pot like Vedic priests. According to Richard Blurton, the ancient works show that the Bodhisattva of Compassion in Buddhism has many features in common with Shiva in Shaivism. The Shaiva Hindu and Buddhist syncretism continues in the contemporary era in the island of Bali, Indonesia. In Central Asian Buddhism, and its historic arts, syncretism and a shared expression of Shaivism, Buddhism and Tantra themes has been common. This is evident in the Kizil Caves in Xinjiang, where there are numerous caves that depict Shiva in the buddhist shrines through wall paintings.

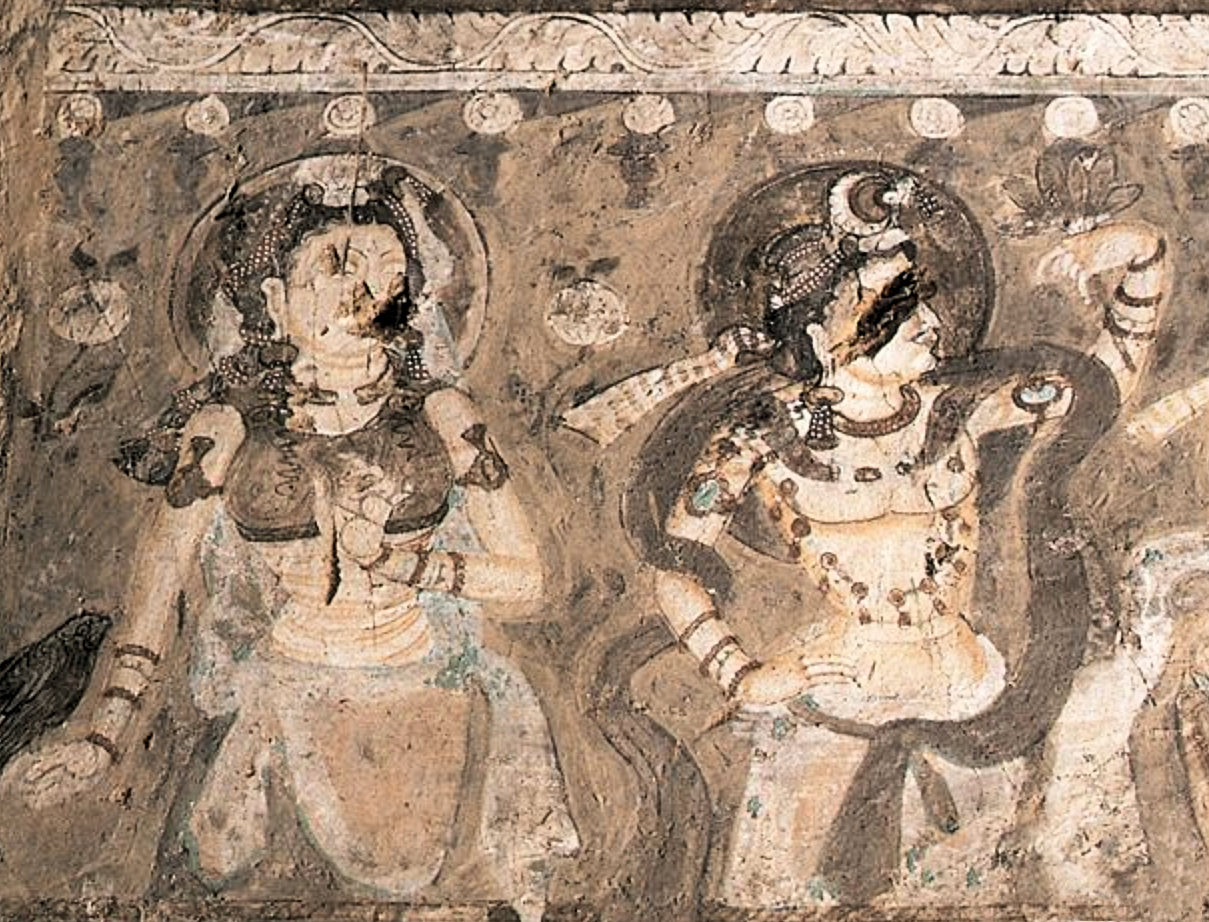
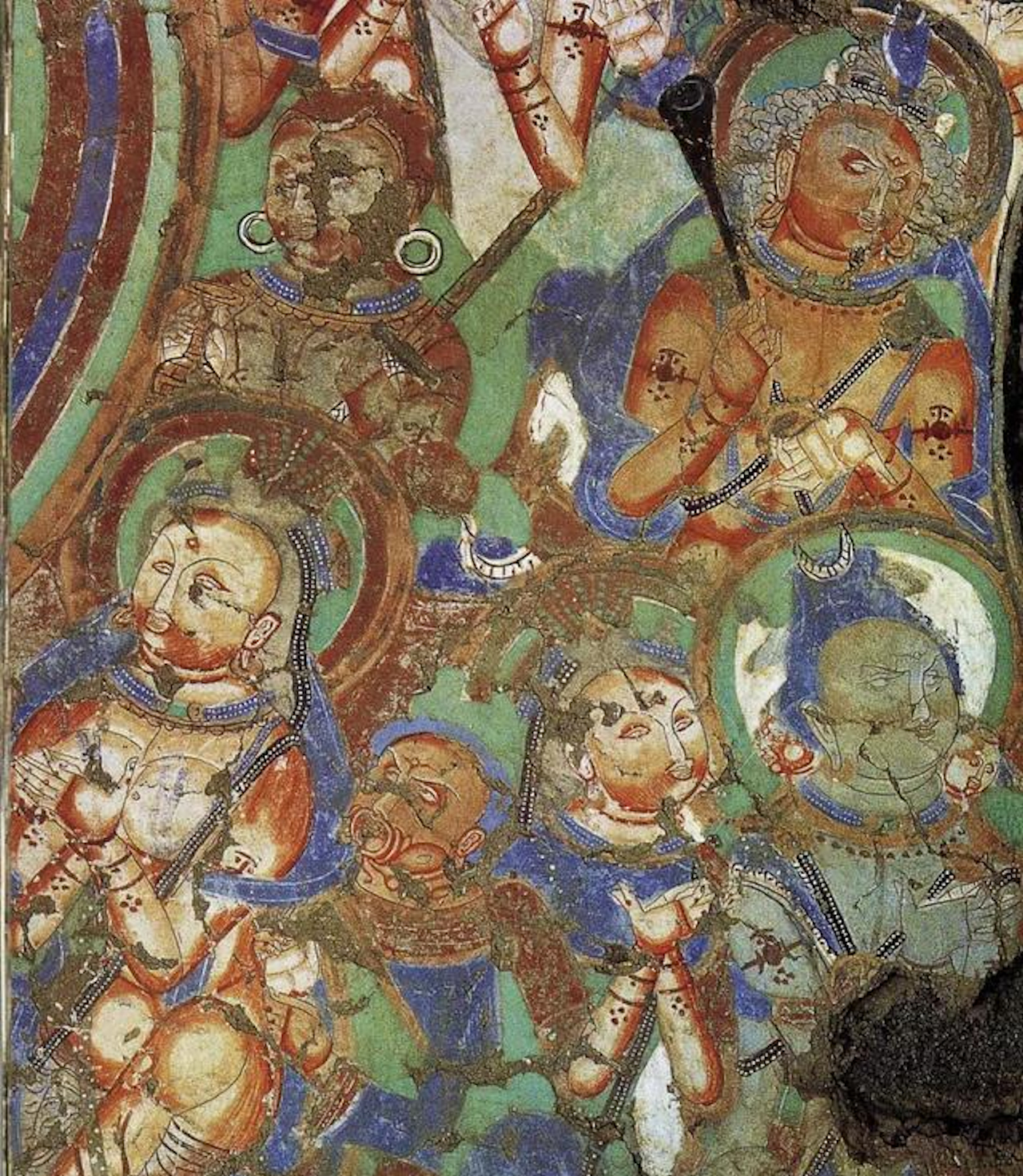
Paintings of Shiva and Parvati in Kizil Caves, Xinjiang, China. The two are at the bottom right of the bottom image.

The syncretism between Buddhism and Shaivism was particularly marked in southeast Asia, but this was not unique, rather it was a common phenomenon also observed in the eastern regions of the Indian subcontinent, the south and the Himalayan regions. This tradition continues in predominantly Hindu Bali Indonesia in the modern era, where Buddha is considered the younger brother of Shiva. (Note: Similarly, in Vaishnavism Hindu tradition, Buddha is considered one of the avatars of Vishnu.) In the pre-Islamic Java, Shaivism and Buddhism were considered very close and allied religions, though not identical religions. (Note: Medieval Hindu texts of Indonesia equate Buddha with Siwa (Shiva) and Janardana (Vishnu).) This idea is also found in the sculptures and temples in the eastern states of India and the Himalayan region. For example, Hindu temples in these regions show Harihara (half Shiva, half Vishnu) flanked by a standing Buddha on its right and a standing Surya (Hindu Sun god) on left.

On major festivals of Bali Hindus, such as the Nyepi – a "festival of silence", the observations are officiated by both Buddhist and Shaiva priests.

=== Jainism ===
Jainism co-existed with Shaiva culture since ancient times, particularly in western and southern India where it received royal support from Hindu kings of the Chaulukya, Ganga and Rashtrakuta dynasties. In late 1st millennium CE, Jainism too developed a Shaiva-like tantric ritual culture with Mantra-goddesses. These Jain rituals were aimed at mundane benefits using japas (mantra recitation) and making offerings into Homa fire.

According to Alexis Sanderson, the link and development of Shaiva goddesses in to Jaina goddess is more transparent than a similar connection between Shaivism and Buddhism. The 11th-century Jain text Bhairavapadmavatikalpa, for example, equates Padmavati of Jainism with Tripura-bhairavi of Shaivism and Shaktism. Among the major goddesses of Jainism that are rooted in Hindu pantheon, particularly Shaiva, include Lakshmi and Vagishvari (Sarasvati) of the higher world in Jain cosmology, Vidyadevis of the middle world, and Yakshis such as Ambika, Cakreshvari, Padmavati and Jvalamalini of the lower world according to Jainism.

Shaiva-Shakti iconography is found in major Jain temples. For example, the Osian temple of Jainism near Jodhpur features Chamunda, Durga, Sitala, and a naked Bhairava. While Shaiva and Jain practices had considerable overlap, the interaction between the Jain community and Shaiva community differed on the acceptance of ritual animal sacrifices before goddesses. Jain remained strictly vegetarian and avoided animal sacrifice, while Shaiva accepted the practice.

=== Kiratism ===
Kiratism is the traditional ethnic religion of the Kirati ethnic groups of Nepal, Darjeeling and Sikkim, highly practiced by Limbu, Yakkha, Sunuwar, Rai, Dhimal and Hayu peoples in the north-eastern Indian subcontinent. According to scholars such as Tom Woodhatch, Kiratism is a blend of shamanism, animism (e.g., ancestor worship of Yuma Sammang/Tagera Ningwaphumang and Paruhang/Sumnima), and Shaivism.

== Temples and pilgrimage ==
Red markers denote important Shaiva temples in the mainland Indian subcontinent.
Orange markers denote UNESCO World Heritage Sites.
Green markers represent the ancient Pancha Ishwarams of Sri Lanka.

Shaiva Puranas, Agamas and other regional literature refer to temples by various terms such as Mandir, Shivayatana, Shivalaya, Shambhunatha, Jyotirlingam, Shristhala, Chattraka, Bhavaggana, Bhuvaneshvara, Goputika, Harayatana, Kailasha, Mahadevagriha, Saudhala and others. In Southeast Asia Shaiva temples are called Candi (Java), Pura (Bali), and Wat (Cambodia and nearby regions).

Many of the Shiva-related pilgrimage sites such as Varanasi, Amarnath, Kedarnath, Somnath, and others are broadly considered holy in Hinduism. They are called kṣétra (Sanskrit: क्षेत्र). A kṣétra has many temples, including one or more major ones. These temples and its location attracts pilgrimage called tirtha (or tirthayatra).

Many of the historic Puranas literature embed tourism guide to Shaivism-related pilgrimage centres and temples. For example, the Skanda Purana deals primarily with Tirtha Mahatmyas (pilgrimage travel guides) to numerous geographical points, but also includes a chapter stating that a temple and tirtha is ultimately a state of mind and virtuous everyday life.

Major rivers of the Indian subcontinent and their confluence (sangam), natural springs, origin of Ganges River (and pancha-ganga), along with high mountains such as Kailasha with Mansovar Lake are particularly revered spots in Shaivism. Twelve jyotirlinga sites across India have been particularly important pilgrimage sites in Shaivism representing the radiant light (jyoti) of infiniteness, as per Śiva Mahāpurāṇa. They are Somnatha, Mallikarjuna, Mahakaleshwar, Omkareshwar, Kedarnatha, Bhimashankar, Visheshvara, Trayambakesvara, Vaidyanatha, Nageshvara, Rameshvara and Grishneshwar. Other texts mention five Kedras (Kedarnatha, Tunganatha, Rudranatha, Madhyamesvara and Kalpeshvara), five Badri (Badrinatha, Pandukeshvara, Sujnanien, Anni matha and Urghava), snow lingam of Amarnatha, flame of Jwalamukhi, all of the Narmada River, and others. Kashi (Varanasi) is declared as particularly special in numerous Shaiva texts and Upanishads, as well as in the pan-Hindu Sannyasa Upanishads such as the Jabala Upanishad.

The early Bhakti movement poets of Shaivism composed poems about pilgrimage and temples, using these sites as metaphors for internal spiritual journey.

== Demography ==
There are no census data available on demographic history or trends for the traditions within Hinduism. Large Shaivite communities exist in the Southern Indian states of Tamil Nadu, Karnataka, Telangana, Kerala and Andhra Pradesh as well as in Jammu and Kashmir, Himachal Pradesh and Uttrakhand. In North Indian communities, Shaivism is most practiced amongst the Kashmiri Hindus and Paharis of the Himalayan belt. Substantial communities are also found in Punjab,Haryana, Maharashtra and North Western Uttar Pradesh.

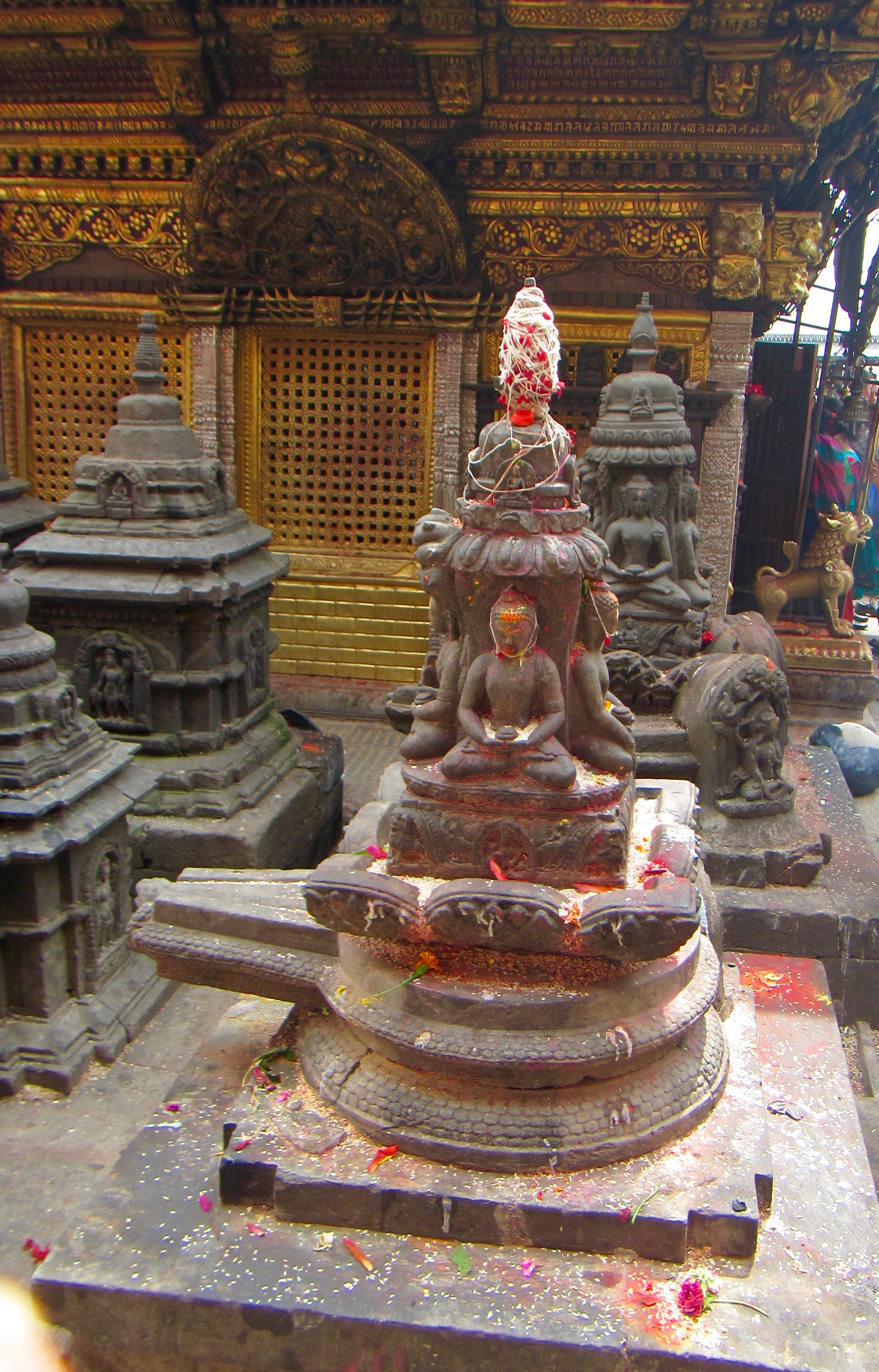
Shaivism and Buddhism have co-developed in many regions. Above a syncretic image of Yoni-Linga with four reliefs of the Buddha in a Vajrayana temple.

According to Galvin Flood, Shaivism and Shaktism traditions are difficult to separate, as many Shaiva Hindus revere the goddess Shakti regularly. The denominations of Hinduism, states Julius Lipner, are unlike those found in major religions of the world, because Hindu denominations are fuzzy with individuals revering gods and goddesses polycentrically, with many Shaiva and Vaishnava adherents recognising Sri (Lakshmi), Parvati, Saraswati and other aspects of the goddess Devi. Similarly, Shakta Hindus revere Shiva and goddesses such as Parvati, Durga, Radha, Sita and Saraswati important in Shaiva and Vaishnava traditions.

== See also ==
- Chaturdasa Devata
- Hindu denominations
- History of Shaivism
- Jangam Lingayat
- Shaiva Siddhanta
- Kashmiri Shaivism

== Sources ==
- Apte, Vaman Shivram (1965). The Practical Sanskrit Dictionary. Delhi: Motilal Banarsidass Publishers. ISBN 978-81-208-0567-5. (fourth revised & enlarged edition).
- Bäumer, B.; Kumar, S., eds. (2011). Saṃvidullāsaḥ: manifestation of divine consciousness: Swami Lakshman Joo, saint-scholar of Kashmir Śaivism, a centenary tribute. D.K. Printworld. ISBN 978-81-246-0414-4.
- Bhandarkar, Ramakrishna Gopal. Vaisnavism, Śaivism, and Minor Religious Systems. New Delhi: Asian Educational Services. ISBN 978-81-206-0122-2. Third AES reprint edition, 1995.
- Bisschop, Peter C. (2020), "Early Śaivism - From Mantramārga Back to Atimārga: Atimārga as a Self-referential Term", in Goodall, Dominic; Hatley, Shaman; Isaacson, Harunaga; Raman, Srilata (eds.), Śaivism and the Tantric Traditions: Essays in Honour of Alexis G.J.S. Sanderson, Gonda Indological Studies, vol. 22, Leiden: Brill Publishers, pp. 14–32, doi:10.1163/9789004432802_003, hdl:1887/135642, ISBN 978-90-04-43266-6, S2CID 229212351.
- Bisschop, Peter C. (2011), Shaivism, Oxford University Press, archived from the original on 2 January 2018
- Briggs, Lawrence Palmer (1951). "The Syncretism of Religions in Southeast Asia, Especially in the Khmer Empire". Journal of the American Oriental Society. 71 (4): 230–249. doi:10.2307/596106. JSTOR 596106.
- Brunn, Stanley D. (2015). The Changing World Religion Map: Sacred Places, Identities, Practices and Politics. Springer. pp. 402–408. ISBN 978-94-017-9376-6. Archived from the original on 15 March 2017.
- Chakravarti, Mahadev (1986), The Concept of Rudra-Śiva Through The Ages (first ed.), Delhi: Motilal Banarsidass
- Chakravarti, Mahadev (1994), The Concept of Rudra-Śiva Through The Ages (Second Revised ed.), Delhi: Motilal Banarsidass, ISBN 978-81-208-0053-3
- Daniélou, Alain (1987). While the Gods Play: Shaiva Oracles and Predictions on the Cycles of History and the Destiny of Mankind. Rochester, Vermont: Inner Traditions. ISBN 978-1-59477-736-3. OCLC 15696932.
- Dasgupta, Surendranath (1955). A History of Indian Philosophy, Vol. 5: The Southern Schools of Śaivism. Cambridge University Press.
- Dhavamony, Mariasusai (1971). Love of God according to Śaiva Siddhānta: a study in the mysticism and theology of Śaivism. Clarendon Press. ISBN 978-0-19-826523-8.
- Dhavamony, Mariasusai (1999). Hindu Spirituality. Gregorian University and Biblical Press. ISBN 978-88-7652-818-7.
- Dyczkowski, Mark (1989). The Canon of the Śaivāgama. Motilal Banarsidass. ISBN 978-81-208-0595-8.
- Flood, Gavin (1996). An Introduction to Hinduism. Cambridge: Cambridge University Press. ISBN 978-0-521-43878-0.
- Flood, Gavin (2003). "The Śaiva Traditions". In Flood, Gavin (ed.). The Blackwell Companion to Hinduism. Malden, MA: Wiley-Blackwell. ISBN 978-1405132510.
- Flood, Gavin. D. (2006). The Tantric Body.
- Gonda, Jan (1975). Handbook of Oriental Studies. Section 3 Southeast Asia, Religions. BRILL Academic. pp. 3–20, 35–36, 49–51. ISBN 90-04-04330-6. Archived from the original on 5 February 2017.
- Gonda, Jan (1977). "10-13". Medieval Religious Literature in Sanskrit. A History of Indian Literature 2.1. Harrassowitz Verlag.
- Ariel Glucklich (2008). The Strides of Vishnu : Hindu Culture in Historical Perspective: Hindu Culture in Historical Perspective. Oxford University Press. ISBN 978-0-19-971825-2.
- Gray, David B. (2016). "Tantra and the Tantric Traditions of Hinduism and Buddhism". Oxford Research Encyclopedia of Religion. Oxford University Press. doi:10.1093/acrefore/9780199340378.013.59. ISBN 9780199340378.
- Grimes, John A. (1995). Ganapati: Song of the Self. SUNY Series in Religious Studies. Albany: State University of New York Press. ISBN 978-0-7914-2440-7.
- Harper, Katherine Anne; Brown, Robert L. (2002). The Roots of Tantra. Albany, New York: State University of New York Press. ISBN 978-0-7914-5306-3.
- Johnson, Todd M; Grim, Brian J (2013). The World's Religions in Figures: An Introduction to International Religious Demography. John Wiley & Sons. p. 400. ISBN 9781118323038. Archived from the original on 9 December 2019.
- Jones, Constance; Ryan, James D. (2006). Encyclopedia of Hinduism. Infobase Publishing. ISBN 978-0-8160-7564-5. Archived from the original on 20 October 2022.
- Keay, John (2000). India: A History. New York: Grove Press. ISBN 978-0-8021-3797-5.
- Kulke, Hermann; Kesavapany, K.; Sakhuja, Vijay (2010). Nagapattinam to Suvarnadwipa: Reflections on the Chola Naval Expeditions to Southeast Asia. Institute of Southeast Asian Studies. ISBN 978-9-8123-0937-2. Archived from the original on 27 March 2023.
- Ann R. Kinney; Marijke J. Klokke; Lydia Kieven (2003). Worshiping Siva and Buddha: The Temple Art of East Java. University of Hawaii Press. ISBN 978-0-8248-2779-3.
- Stella Kramrisch (1993). The Presence of Siva. Princeton University Press. ISBN 978-0-691-01930-7.
- Kramrisch, Stella (1994a), The Presence of Śiva, Princeton, New Jersey: Princeton University Press, ISBN 978-0691019307
- Lawrence, David Peter (2012). "Kashmiri Shaiva Philosophy". Archived from the original on 12 March 2017.
- Lipner, Julius (2004). "Hinduism: the way of the banyan". In Mittal, Sushil; Thursby, Gene (eds.). The Hindu World. Routledge. ISBN 0-415-21527-7.
- Lipner, Julius (2012). Hindus: Their Religious Beliefs and Practices. Routledge. ISBN 978-1-135-24061-5.
- Lorenzen, David N. (1972). The Kāpālikas and Kālāmukhas: Two Lost Śaivite Sects. University of California Press. ISBN 978-0-520-01842-6. Archived from the original on 5 February 2017.
- Lorenzen, David N. (1987). "Śaivism: An Overview". In Mircea Eliade (ed.). The Encyclopedia of Religion. Vol. 13. Collier Macmillan.
- Lorenzen, David N. (2020) [1972]. "Chapter I: Four Śaivite Sects". The Kāpālikas and Kālāmukhas: Two Lost Śaivite Sects. Center for South and Southeast Asia Studies (1st ed.). Berkeley and Los Angeles: University of California Press. pp. XI–XIII, 1–16. doi:10.1525/9780520324947-003. ISBN 9780520324947. OCLC 1224279234.
- Lorenzen, David N. (2023) [1972]. "Chapter II: Kāpālika Sources". The Kāpālikas and Kālāmukhas: Two Lost Śaivite Sects. Center for South and Southeast Asia Studies (Reprint ed.). Berkeley and Los Angeles: University of California Press. doi:10.1525/9780520324947-004. ISBN 9780520324947. OCLC 1224279234.
- Mallinson, James (2011), "Yoga: Haṭha Yoga", in Basu, Helene; Jacobsen, Knut A.; Malinar, Angelika; Narayanan, Vasudha (eds.), Brill's Encyclopedia of Hinduism, vol. 3, Leiden: Brill Publishers, pp. 770–781, doi:10.1163/2212-5019_BEH_COM_000354, ISBN 978-90-04-17641-6, ISSN 2212-5019 – via Academia.edu
- Mallinson, James (2012). "Nāth Sampradāya". In Knut A. Jacobsen; Helene Basu; Angelika Malinar; Vasudha Narayanan (eds.). Brill's Encyclopedia of Hinduism. Vol. 3. Brill Academic.
- Mate, M. S. (1988). Temples and Legends of Maharashtra. Bombay: Bharatiya Vidya Bhavan.
- Michaels, Axel (2004). Hinduism: Past and Present. Princeton, New Jersey: Princeton University Press. ISBN 978-0-691-08953-9.
- R. Blake Michael (1992). The Origins of Vīraśaiva Sects: A Typological Analysis of Ritual and Associational Patterns in the Śūnyasaṃpādane. Motilal Banarsidass. ISBN 978-81-208-0776-1.
- Muller-Ortega, Paul E. (2010). Triadic Heart of Siva, The: Kaula Tantricism of Abhinavagupta in the Non-dual Shaivism of Kashmir. State University of New York Press. ISBN 978-1-4384-1385-3.
- Nath, Vijay (March–April 2001). "From 'Brahmanism' to 'Hinduism': Negotiating the Myth of the Great Tradition". Social Scientist. 29 (3/4): 19–50. doi:10.2307/3518337. JSTOR 3518337.
- O'Brien-Kop, Karen (2022). "Siddha Yoga". In Long, Jeffery D. (ed.). Hinduism and Tribal Religions. SpringerLink.
- Oberlies, T. (1998). Die Religion des Rgveda. Vienna.
- Parmeshwaranand, S. (2004). Encyclopaedia of the Śaivism. Sarup & Sons. ISBN 978-81-7625-427-4.
- Pathak, V. S. (1960). History of Śaiva Cults in Northern India from Inscriptions, 700 A.D. to 1200 A.D. Motilal Banarsidass.
- Indira Viswanathan Peterson (2014). Poems to Siva: The Hymns of the Tamil Saints. Princeton University Press. ISBN 978-1-4008-6006-7.
- Preston, Charles. "List of religious populations | Largest Religions, Smallest Religions, Lists, Data, & Overview | Britannica". www.britannica.com.
- A. K. Ramanujan (1973). Speaking of Śiva. Penguin. ISBN 978-0-14-044270-0.
- Velcheru Narayana Rao; Gene H. Roghair (2014). Siva's Warriors: The Basava Purana of Palkuriki Somanatha. Princeton University Press. ISBN 978-1-4008-6090-6.
- Rigopoulos, Antonio (1998). Dattatreya: The Immortal Guru, Yogin, and Avatara: A Study of the Transformative and Inclusive Character of a Multi-faceted Hindu Deity. State University of New York Press. ISBN 978-0-7914-3696-7.
- Rocher, Ludo (1986). The Puranas. Otto Harrassowitz Verlag. ISBN 978-3447025225.
- Samuel, Geoffrey (2008), The Origins of Yoga and Tantra, Cambridge University Press, ISBN 978-0-521-69534-3
- Sanderson, Alexis (1988). "Saivism and the Tantric Traditions". In S Sutherland; et al. (eds.). The World's Religions. Routledge.
- Sanderson, Alexis (1995). "Meaning of a Tantric Ritual". In AM Blondeau; K Schipper (eds.). Essais sur le Rituel. Louvain: Peeters.
- Sanderson, Alexis (2004). "The Śaiva Religion among the Khmers Part I". Bulletin de l'École Française d'Extrême-Orient. 90/91: 349–462. JSTOR 43732654.
- Sanderson, Alexis (2009). "The Śaiva Age: The Rise and Dominance of Śaivism during the Early Medieval Period". In Shingo Einoo (ed.). Genesis and Development of Tantrism. Tokyo: Institute of Oriental Culture.
- Sanderson, Alexis (2010). Dominic Goodall & Andre Padoux (ed.). Mélanges tantriques à la mémoire d'Hélène Brunner: Tantric Studies in Memory of Hélène Brunner. Institut Français de Pondichéry. ISBN 978-2855396668.
- Sanderson, Alexis (2012–2013). "The Śaiva Literature" (PDF). Journal of Indological Studies (Kyoto), Nos. 24 & 25 (2012–2013), 2014. Archived from the original (PDF) on 4 March 2016.
- Hilko Wiardo Schomerus (2000). Śaiva Siddhānta: An Indian School of Mystical Thought : Presented as a System and Documented from the Original Tamil Sources. Motilal Banarsidass. ISBN 978-81-208-1569-8.
- Sharma, Ram Karan (1988). Elements of Poetry in the Mahābhārata. Delhi: Motilal Banarsidass. ISBN 978-81-208-0544-6. Second edition
- Singh, Jaideva (1982). Pratyabhijnahrdayam: The Secret of Self-recognition. Motilal Banarsidass. ISBN 978-81-208-0323-7. Archived from the original on 15 March 2017.
- Singh, Jaideva (1989). A Trident of Wisdom: Translation of Paratrisika-vivarana. State University of New York Press. ISBN 978-0-7914-0180-4. Archived from the original on 15 March 2017.
- Smith, David (1996). The Dance of Siva: Religion, Art and Poetry in South India. Cambridge University Press. ISBN 978-0-521-48234-9.
- Tagare, Ganesh (2002). The Pratyabhijñā Philosophy. Motilal Banarsidass. ISBN 978-81-208-1892-7.
- Tattwananda, Swami (1984). Vaisnava Sects, Saiva Sects, Mother Worship (First Revised ed.). Calcutta: Firma KLM Private Ltd.
- Urban, Hugh B. (2007) [2003]. "India's Darkest Heart: Tantra in the Literary Imagination". Tantra: Sex, Secrecy, Politics, and Power in the Study of Religion (1st ed.). Berkeley and Delhi: University of California Press/Motilal Banarsidass. pp. 106–133. doi:10.1525/california/9780520230620.003.0004. ISBN 9780520236561. JSTOR 10.1525/j.ctt1pp4mm.9.
- Vasugupta (1992). The Aphorisms of Siva: The Siva Sutra with Bhaskara's Commentary, the Varttika. Translated by Mark Dyczkowski. State University of New York Press. ISBN 978-0-7914-1264-0.
- Venugopalam, R. (2003). Meditation: Any Time Any Where (First ed.). Delhi: B. Jain Publishers (P) Ltd. ISBN 81-8056-373-1.
- Wallis, Christopher (2013). Tantra Illuminated.
- Winternitz, Maurice (1972). History of Indian Literature. New Delhi: Oriental Books Reprint Corporation. Second revised reprint edition. Two volumes. First published 1927 by the University of Calcutta.
