= Old Stone (disambiguation) =

Old Stone is a 2016 Chinese-Canadian drama film

Old Stone or variation may also refer to:

- Oldstone Conference (1949) post-war U.S. NAS quantum physics conference
- Old Frankfort Stone High School (built 1892) Frankfort, Indiana, NRHP listed building
- Old Stone Vineyard and Winery, Salisbury, North Carolina
- Old Stone Hotel (built 1851) Warren, Illinois, NRHP listed building
- Old Stone Bank (aka Providence Institution for Savings) (1819-1993) Rhode Island bank
- Bank of the Commonwealth (Kentucky) (aka Old Stone Bank) (built 1809) NRHP listed building

== See also ==
- Old Stone Fort (disambiguation), several forts
- Old Stone Store (disambiguation), several stores
- Old Stone House (disambiguation), several buildings
- Old Stone Church (disambiguation), several churches
- Old Stone Tavern (disambiguation), several taverns
- Old Stone Arch Bridge (disambiguation), several arch bridges
- Old Stone Age
- Stone (disambiguation)
- Old (disambiguation)
