= The Stone =

The Stone may refer to:

== Film and television ==
- The Stone (1977 film), an Azerbaijani film of the 1970s
- The Stone (2013 film), a South Korean film
- The Stone (2025 film), a Thai film
- "The Stone", a 1985 episode of the cartoon Kidd Video

== Music ==
- The Stone (band), a Serbian black metal band
- The Stone (music space), an experimental music space in New York City, US
- The Stone (San Francisco), a music club in California, US
- The Stone (Babble album) or the title song, 1994
- The Stone (Milford Graves and Bill Laswell album), 2014
- A series of experimental music albums:
  - The Stone: Issue One, by John Zorn and others, 2005
  - The Stone: Issue Two, by Fred Frith and Chris Cutler, 2007
  - The Stone: Issue Three, by John Zorn, Lou Reed and Laurie Anderson, 2008
- "The Stone" (Ashes Divide song), 2008
- "The Stone" (Dave Matthews Band song), 1998

== Other uses ==
- The Stone (video game), a 1996 online puzzle game
- The Stone (blog), the New York Times philosophy blog

== See also ==
- Stone (disambiguation)
- Stones (disambiguation)
- The Stones (disambiguation)
