= Stone (comics) =

Stone, in comics, may refer to:

- Stone (Marvel Comics), a number of Marvel Comics characters
- Stone (manga), a Japanese manga series by Sin-ichi Hiromoto
- Tyler Stone (Marvel Comics), a Marvel Comics character
- John Stone (comics), a character from Wildstorm's Planetary
- Mike Stone, a Marvel character using the name Sunturion

Comic creators with the surname Stone:

- Chic Stone, America comics artist
- Dave Stone, British writer

It may also refer to:

- Stone Boy, a member of the Legion of Substitute Heroes
- Stone Soup (comic strip)
- Stonecutter (comics), a Marvel Comics character
- Stonewall (comics), a Marvel Comics character

== See also ==
- Stone (disambiguation)
