= Strome =

Strome may refer to:

== People ==
- Sue Black, Baroness Black of Strome, Scottish forensic anthropologist
- Jennifer Strome, producer and writer
- Dylan Strome (born 1997), Canadian ice hockey player
- Mark Strome, American businessman
- Ryan Strome (born 1993), Canadian ice hockey player
- Steve Strome, former head men’s tennis coach at Miami University, Louisiana State University
- Anders Strome (born 1981), Canadian ice hockey player

== Places ==
- Strome, Alberta, village in East Central Alberta, Canada
- Strome Castle, ruined castle on the shore of Loch Carron in Stromemore on the west coast of the Scottish Highlands
- Strome Park, Lincoln County Park in Coastal Oregon, USA

== See also ==
- Land der Berge, Land am Strome (Land of the mountains, land on the river), the national anthem of Austria
- Lava-Ströme (Streams of Lava), the name of a waltz composed by Johann Strauss II
- Stromae (born 1985), Belgian musician
- Stromeferry
- Strone (disambiguation)
