= Stones (disambiguation) =

Stones, or rocks, are naturally occurring masses of minerals.

Stones may also refer to:

== Literature ==
- Stones (comic), a story in the Star Wars Tales comic book series
- Stones (novel), a 2001 novel by William E. Bell
- Stones (short story collection), a 1988 book by Timothy Findley

== Music ==
- The Rolling Stones, an English band often referred to as "the Stones"
- SixTones, pronounced "Stones", a Japanese idol group

=== Albums ===
- Stones (Alfabeats Nu Jazz album) or the title song, 2006
- Stones (Dan Seals album) or the title song, 1980
- Stones (Manafest album) or the title song, 2017
- Stones (Neil Diamond album) or the title song (see below), 1971

=== Songs ===
- "Stones" (Neil Diamond song), 1971
- "Stones" (The Rolling Stones song), properly "Stoned", 1963
- "Stones" (Zibbz song), 2018
- "Stones", by Bruce Springsteen from Western Stars, 2019
- "Stones", by Sonic Youth from Sonic Nurse, 2004
- "Stones", by Status Quo from If You Can't Stand the Heat..., 1978

== Other uses ==
- Stone (fruit), the stone inside some fruits, also called a pit or pyrena
- Stone (unit), a measure of weight formerly used in various Germanic European countries and still commonly used in Great Britain and Ireland for measuring human body weight
- Stones (film), a 2002 Spanish film
- Stones Peak, a mountain in Colorado
- Stones (surname), people with the surname
- Stones Brewery, a defunct British brewery
- Stones, a 1991 computer game in the Microsoft Entertainment Pack 2

== See also ==
- Stone (disambiguation)
- The Stone (disambiguation)
- The Stones (disambiguation)
