= Stone (disambiguation) =

A stone is a small piece of rock.

Stone may also refer to:

== Unit of measurement ==
- Stone (unit), a measure of weight formerly used in various Germanic European countries and still commonly used in Great Britain and Ireland for measuring human body weight
- Stone (Chinese weight)

== Materials and minerals ==
- Building stone, a building material
- Dimension stone, stone fabricated to specific sizes or shapes
- Gemstone, an attractive mineral used for adornments
- Stoneware, a ceramic ware

== Biology ==
- Calculus (concretion), a stone formed in the body, such as kidney stones or gallstones
- Pyrena, the hard seed-bearing kernel inside drupe fruits such as peaches and olives

== Geography ==
=== England ===
- Stone, Buckinghamshire
- Stone, Gloucestershire
- Stone, South Yorkshire
- Stone, Staffordshire
- Stone (UK Parliament constituency) in Staffordshire
- Stone, Worcestershire
- Kent
  - part of Norton, Buckland and Stone, near Faversham in the Borough of Swale
  - Stone, Kent, in the Borough of Dartford
  - Stone in Oxney, near Tenterden in the Borough of Ashford

=== United States ===
- Stone, Kentucky
- Stone, Wisconsin
- Stone County (disambiguation)

== People ==
- Stone (singer), the stage name of French singer and actress Annie Gautrat, solo and part of duo Stone et Charden
- Stone (surname), people with the surname Stone
- Stone Forsythe (born 1997), American football player
- Stone Garrett (born 1995), American baseball player
- Stone Gossard, American rock musician
- Stone Hallquist (1902–1981), American football running back
- Stone Johnson (1940–1963), Olympic sprinting athlete, American football kick returner and running back
- Stone Librande (born 1972), American video game designer at Riot Games
- Stone Phillips, American news anchor
- Stone Smartt (born 1998), American football player

== Art, entertainment, and media ==
=== Comics ===
- Stone (manga), a Japanese manga series by Sin-ichi Hiromoto
- Dr. Stone, a Japanese manga series by Riichiro Inagaki

=== Film and television ===
- Stone (1974 film), an Australian action-adventure
- Stone (2010 film), an American drama
- Stone (2012 film), a Russian dramatic thriller
- Stone (TV series), an American crime-drama television series
- Stone Cates, a character from General Hospital played by Michael Sutton

=== Games and sport ===
- Curling stone, used in the sport of curling
- Stone skipping
- Objects used in the game of Go

=== Literature ===
- Stone (novel), a science fiction novel by Adam Roberts
- Stone trilogy, a novel series by Graham Edwards
- Stone (1971), a novel by Douglass Wallop
- "Stone", a 1979 short story by Edward Bryant

=== Music ===
==== Bands ====
- Stone (Finnish band), a thrash metal band from Finland
- Stone (British band), an English alternative rock band

==== Albums ====
- Stone (Stone album), 1988
- Stone (Crash Vegas album), 1993
- Stone (Baroness album), 2023
- Stone, a 1997 EP by Unbelievable Truth

==== Songs ====
- "Stone" (Alice in Chains song), 2013
- "Stone" (Cyrus song), 2015
- "Stone", by Prince Alla, 1991
- "Stone", by the Small Faces from First Step
- "Stone", by Stereophonics from Pull the Pin
- "Stone", by Kim Wilde from Close, 1988

== Brands and companies ==
- Stone Brewing Co.
- Stone Group
- Stone Energy Corporation
- Stones Bitter

== Other uses ==
- Stone butch
- Stone (curling)
- Stoner (drug user)
- Stoning (metalworking), using a stone to sharpen metal
- Stoning, a form of capital punishment
- SS-26 Stone, a ballistic missile system
- USCGC Stone, a U.S. Coast Guard Legend-class cutter

== See also ==
- Justice Stone (disambiguation)
- The Stone (disambiguation)
- The Stones (disambiguation)
- Stoned (disambiguation)
- Stoner (disambiguation)
- Stones (disambiguation)
- Ston (disambiguation)
- Strone (disambiguation)
- Stonne, a French commune
- Old Stone (disambiguation)
