= Nutlet (disambiguation) =

A nutlet is a small nut.

Nutlet may also refer to:

- Pyrena or nutlet, a seed covered by a stony layer
- Nutlet or Oreshek, another name for Shlisselburg Fortress, Russia
