= Ston (disambiguation) =

Ston is a village and municipality in Croatia.

Ston may also refer to

- Mali Ston, a village in Croatia
- Roman Catholic Diocese of Ston, in Croatia
- Ston Easton, a village and civil parish in England
  - Ston Easton Park
- Tjakkatjakka Ston, an abandoned village in Suriname
- STON, an abbreviation for a former name of the Soviet Solovki prison camp
- Ston (Martian crater)

== See also ==
- Stone (disambiguation)
- Stonne, a commune in France
