= The Stone: Issue One =

2006 live music album

Live album by John Zorn, Dave Douglas, Rob Burger, Bill Laswell, Mike Patton and Ben Perowsky
- Released: Dec 19, 2005
- Label: Tzadik
- Producer: John Zorn

The Stone Benefit series chronology
The Stone: Issue One (2005)	The Stone: Issue Two (2007)

The Stone: Issue One is a limited edition live album of improvised experimental music by John Zorn, Dave Douglas, Rob Burger, Bill Laswell, Mike Patton and Ben Perowsky recorded at The Stone in 2005. The first 1000 copies were personally autographed by Zorn. All proceeds from the sale of this album support The Stone.

== Reception ==
Professional ratings
Review scores
Source	Rating
All About Jazz	4/5 stars

In a review for All About Jazz, Brian P. Lonergan wrote: "One of the more striking aspects of the playing on The Stone, Issue One... is the sense of immediacy and transparency about the music. It's as if you have a clear window into the improvisatory act, witnessing pure, unpremeditated creation as it happens for the very first time."

== Track listing ==
1. "Introduction"
2. "Interlude 1" (Patton)
3. "Part One"
4. "Interlude 2" (Douglas/Zorn)
5. "Part Two"
6. "Interlude 3" (Laswell)
7. "Postlude"
8. "Coda"

== Personnel ==
- Dave Douglas – trumpet
- Rob Burger – organ, electric piano
- Bill Laswell – bass
- Ben Perowsky – percussion
- Mike Patton – voice
- John Zorn – alto saxophone
