= Stoned =

Stoned may refer to:

- Substance intoxication, particularly cannabis intoxication
- Petrification, process of organic matter turning into stone
- Stoning, a form of punishment where a group throws stones at the victim
- Stoning (metalworking), a method to sharpen the edges of steel tools
- Stoned (computer virus), a boot-sector virus created in 1987

== Arts and entertainment ==
=== Film and television ===
- Stoned (TV special), a 1981 ABC Afterschool Special episode starring Scott Baio
- Stoned (film), a 2005 film about Brian Jones, one of the founders of The Rolling Stones

=== Autobiography ===
- Stoned, a 1998 autobiography by Andrew Loog Oldham
- Stoned: Photographs & treasures from life with the Rolling Stones, a 2019 autobiography by Jo Wood

=== Music ===
==== Albums ====
- Stoned, Part I, a 2003 album by Lewis Taylor
- Stoned, Part II, a 2004 album by Lewis Taylor
- Stoned (Acid Witch album), 2010
- Lapidation (album), a 2007 album by composer and keyboardist Anthony Coleman

==== Songs ====
- "Stoned" (Rolling Stones song), a 1963 recording
- "Stoned", a song from the 1999 album Astro Lounge by Smash Mouth
- "Stoned" (Dido song), a 2003 single
- "Stoned" (Puddle of Mudd song), a 2010 reocording
- "Stoned", a song from the deluxe edition of the 2023 album Subtract by Ed Sheeran

== See also ==
- Stone (disambiguation)
