= Stone Church =

Stone Church may refer to:

== Settlements in the United States ==
- Stone Church, Illinois
- Stone Church, New Jersey

== Buildings in the United States ==
- Casa Grande Stone Church, Casa Grande, Arizona, listed on the National Register of Historic Places (NRHP)
- Stone Church (Ringgold, Georgia), listed on the National Register of Historic Places in Catoosa County
- Stone Church (Independence, Missouri), of the Community of Christ
- The Stone Church, a live-music venue in Newmarket, New Hampshire
- Holland Patent Stone Churches Historic District, Holland Patent, New York, listed on the NRHP
- Casstown Lutheran Stone Church, Casstown, Ohio, listed on the NRHP
- Zion Stone Church, Augustaville, Pennsylvania, listed on the NRHP
- Augusta Stone Church, Fort Defiance, Virginia, listed on the NRHP

== See also ==
- Old Stone Church (disambiguation)
