= Hells Angels (manga) =

Japanese manga series

- First tankōbon volume cover
- Genre: Dark comedy; Dark fantasy
- Manga
- Written by: Shinichi Hiromoto
- Published by: Shueisha
- Magazine: Ultra Jump
- Original run: August 19, 2002 – April 19, 2004
- Volumes: 3
- Anime film

Hells
- Directed by: Yoshiki Yamakawa
- Written by: Yoshiki Yamakawa; Kazuyuki Fudeyasu
- Music by: Edison
- Studio: Madhouse
- Licensed by: NA: Discotek Media
- Released: October 18, 2008
- Runtime: 117 minutes
- icon

Hells Angels (stylized in all caps) is a Japanese manga series written and illustrated by Shinichi Hiromoto. It was serialized in Shueisha's seinen manga magazine Ultra Jump from August 2002 to April 2004 and compiled into three tankōbon volumes. It follows a teenage girl named Rinne Amagane who dies on her way to school and ends up in another school, in the underworld. While down there, she learns to get along with her new classmates, who are all demons.

Hells Angels was adapted into an anime film produced by Madhouse, which premiered at the 2008 Tokyo International Film Festival. The film was initially released under its original title, but was later retitled to Hells on the 2012 Blu-ray release. The film was licensed by Discotek Media in 2017.

== Plot ==
Rinne (Linne) Amagane is a playful and cheerful teenager. One day, she gets hit by a truck on her way to school and lands in Hell. Far from being discouraged, she wants to finish her schooling and will try, despite the circumstances, to make friends, which she had promised herself when she was alive, but what she does not know is the fact that she is already dead.

== Cast ==
Hells cast
| Roles | Japanese | English |
|---|---|---|
| Rinne Amagane | Misato Fukuen | Amanda Lee |
| Ryu Kutō | Daisuke Kishio | Howard Wang |
| Headmaster Hellvis | Fumihiko Tachiki | Jason Marnocha |
| Steela / Stealer | Miyuki Sawashiro | Megan Shipman |
| Rokku | Chō | Bea Billany |
| Mario | Hidenobu Kiuchi | Joshua Gotay |
| Rei Kagurazaka | Yūna Inamura | Amber Lee Connors |
| Luca | Akeno Watanabe | Corinne Sudberg |
| Phantoma | Yui Kano | Marin Miller |
| Kiki | Ami Koshimizu | Sarah Anne Williams |
| Wolfie | Yuki Matsuoka | Marissa Lenti |
| Cronola | Yū Asakawa | Caitlyn Elizabeth |
| Gillealla | Rina Satō | Amanda Gish |
| Curia | Nana Inoue | Elizabeth Maxwell |
| Mummyla | Akeno Watanabe | Emily Fajardo |
| Franken (grunts) | Nobuyuki Hiyama | Benjamin Tehrani |
| Who | Keiji Fujiwara | Chris Guererro |
| Rinne's Mother | Romi Park | Jessica Calvello |
| Pandaz | Nobuyuki Hiyama | Scott Frerichs |
| Captain of the East Witches | Takako Honda | Melissa Sternenberg |
| Dorm mother | Masako Nozawa | Lawrence Simpson |
| Homeroom teacher | Zennosuke Fukkin | Nick Landis |
| Hebo | Keiji Fujiwara | Anthony Sardinha |

== Media ==
=== Manga ===
Hells Angels is written and illustrated by Shinichi Hiromoto. It was serialized in Shueisha's seinen manga magazine Ultra Jump from August 19, 2002, (Note: It debuted in the September 2002 issue, released on August 19 of that same year.) to April 19, 2004. (Note: It finished in the May 2004 issue, released on April 19 of that same year.) Shueisha collected its chapters in three tankōbon volumes published from April 18, 2003, to July 16, 2004.

==== Volumes ====
| No. | Release date | ISBN |
|---|---|---|
| 1 | April 18, 2003 | 4-08-876438-2 |
1. "The State of Hell..." (地獄犬の沙大モ..., Jigoku-inu no Sadai mo…); 2. "You're Already Dead!!" (オマエはもう死んでいる!!, Omae wa mō Shindeiru!!); 3. "I Am an AntiChrist I Am A!!"; 4. "The 2 or 3 affairs swirling around Kutou-senpai" (九頭センパイにまっわる2・3の事, Kutou-senpai ni Mawaru Ni, San no koto); 5. "Apocalypse in Hell" (地獄DE黙示録, Jigoku De Mokushiroku); 6. "Our Pledge, We Vow to Follow the Rules of Good Sportsmanship and Compete Properly and Correctly" (宣言! 我々はスポーツマンシップにのっとり正々堂々と戦う事を誓います。, Sensen, Wareware wa Supōtsumanshippu ni Nottori, Seiseidōdō to Tatakau Koto o Chikaimasu); 7. "Grant Our Wish, Dammit" (ノゾミカナエタマエ, Nozomi Kanae Tamae)
| 2 | October 17, 2003 | 4-08-876521-4 |
8. "I Don't Like Monday"; 9. "Blue Monday"; 10. "Ruby Tuesday"; 11. "Birthday"; 12. "Wednesday to Friday"; 13. "Saturday Night Experience"; 14. "Holyday"
| 3 | July 16, 2004 | 4-08-876633-4 |
15. "Sunday Bloody Sunday"; 16. "Sunday People"; 17. "Beautiful Sunday"; 18. "Happy Birthday"; 19. "End of the Day"; 20. "The Day"; 21. "Today"

=== Film ===
An anime film adaptation by Madhouse, which premiered at the 2008 Tokyo International Film Festival. The theme song is "Breathe Again feat. Sphere" by Jamosa.

The Japanese distributor TC Entertainment released the film, simply titled as Hells, on Blu-ray with English subtitles on August 3, 2012. On June 12, 2017, Discotek Media had announced at its panel at AnimeNEXT that it would release the film on Blu-ray and DVD. On August 13, 2017, Discotek Media announced that the home media release would include an English dub. The English dub of the film marked the first time voice acting/video production company TeamFourStar (known for the comedic parody webseries Dragon Ball Z Abridged) worked on an official dub. Discotek Media released the Blu-ray on November 27, 2018.

== Reception ==
The Hells anime film was one of the Jury Recommended Works at the 12th Japan Media Arts Festival in 2008.

The Encyclopedia of Science Fiction described Hells as a striking and memorable but flawed anime film, praising its often excellent animation, characterized by raw, imaginative and stylistically varied visuals combining humor, horror and surrealism. It highlighted the film's unconventional treatment of Christian mythology, particularly its reversal of the traditional roles of Cain and Abel, with Cain portrayed sympathetically and Abel as the antagonist. However, the encyclopedia criticized the overcrowded narrative, suggesting that the filmmakers had attempted to compress too much of the original manga into the adaptation. It particularly faulted the rushed development of the relationship between Linne and Stealer, arguing that this weakened the emotional impact of the latter's sacrifice. Despite these shortcomings, it considered Stealer an iconic character.

== See also ==
- Stone, another manga series by the same author
