= The Stone: Issue Two =

Album by Fred Frith and Chris Cutler

Live album by Fred Frith and Chris Cutler
- Released: February 2007
- Recorded: 15 December 2006
- Venue: The Stone, New York City
- Genre: Experimental music, free improvisation
- Length: 50:44
- Label: Tzadik (US)
- Producer: John Zorn

Fred Frith and Chris Cutler chronology
2 Gentlemen in Verona (2004)	The Stone: Issue Two (2007)

Fred Frith chronology
The Happy End Problem (2006)	The Stone: Issue Two (2007)	Cutter Heads (2007)

The Stone Benefit series chronology
The Stone: Issue One (2006)	The Stone: Issue Two (2007)	The Stone: Issue Three (2008)

The Stone: Issue Two is a 2007 live album of improvised experimental music by Fred Frith and Chris Cutler. It was recorded at The Stone in New York City on 15 December 2006 and was one of four CDs released between 2006 and 2010 by Tzadik Records to raise funds for The Stone. It was Frith and Cutler's fourth collaborative album.

== The Stone Benefit series ==
All titles released by Tzadik Records.

- The Stone: Issue One (2006) – John Zorn, Dave Douglas, Rob Burger, Bill Laswell, Mike Patton and Ben Perowsky
- The Stone: Issue Two (2007) – Fred Frith and Chris Cutler
- The Stone: Issue Three (2008) – John Zorn, Lou Reed and Laurie Anderson
- The Stone: Issue Four (2010) – Chris Wood, Billy Martin and John Medeski

== Background ==
Frith and Cutler were members of the English avant-rock group Henry Cow (1968–1978), and their collaboration at The Stone on 15 December 2006 took place during the so-called "Henry Cow reunion" weekend when they reunited with bandmate Tim Hodgkinson. (Note: During the trio's performance on 16 December 2006 Frith told the audience "This is not Henry Cow!" and dedicated the session to the other band members.)

== Reception ==
Professional ratings
Review scores
Source	Rating
All About Jazz	favorable
AllMusic	4/5 stars

In a review of The Stone: Issue Two at AllMusic, Michael G. Nastos described Cutler's performance as "intriguing" "electronic colorations", and Frith's as "challenging, commanding, and demonstrative". He said this is a recording that careful listening to will demonstrate "the sense of passion, wonder, and depth these two have displayed in their music since their days with Henry Cow, but digging deeper than ever".

Marc Medwin wrote in a review in All About Jazz that compared to Frith and Cutler's earlier collaborations, this set is "rich and full" and makes it sound like there are more than just two of them. Medwin added that this album is a worthy addition to The Stone's benefit series.

Reviewing the album in The Wire, Barry Witherden described the music as "fascinating, bemusing, hypnotic, seductive, sometimes disturbing, sometimes consoling, sometimes chaotic, ultimately revealing a mysterious, elemental beauty". He said one of the joys of listening to "sound-sculpting" like this is "trying to work out ... not only who plays what but how the sounds are created". Witherden stated that what makes this album work is Frith and Cutler's "imagination and control of design, trajectory and texture".

== Track listing ==
No.	Title	Writer(s)	Length
1.	"Live at the Stone"	Fred Frith, Chris Cutler	50:44

Sources: Liner notes, Discogs, Fred Frith discography.

== Personnel ==
- Fred Frith – guitars
- Chris Cutler – drums, detritus, electronics

Sources: Liner notes, Discogs, Fred Frith discography.

=== Sound and artwork ===
- Recorded by Robert O'Haire
- Mastered by Scott Hull
- Produced by John Zorn
- Photography by Scott Friedlander
- Designed by Heung-Heung Chin

Sources: Liner notes, Discogs, Fred Frith discography.
