= Rudraksha =

Fruitstone used as a prayer bead in Hinduism

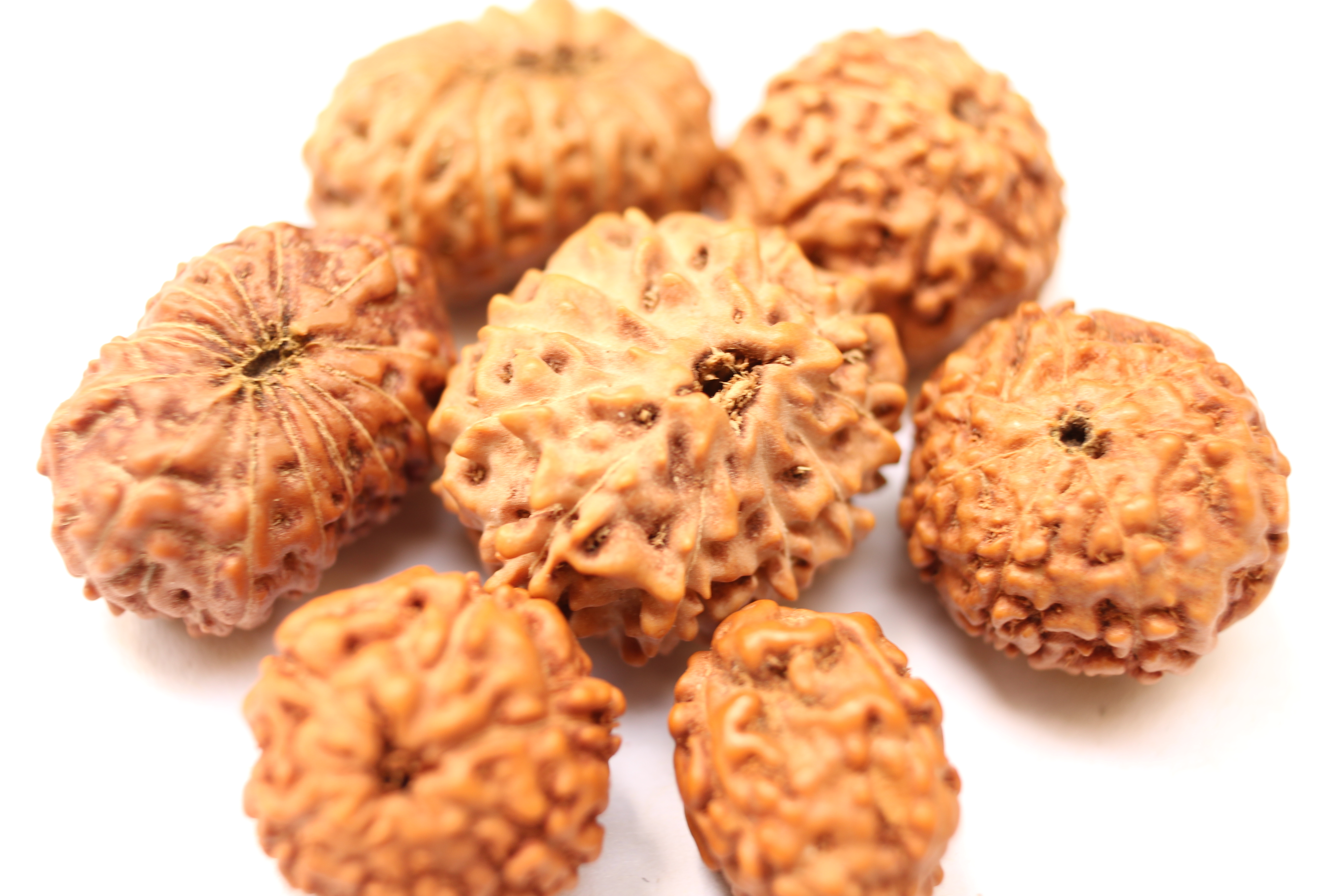
Rudraksha beads are the dried stones of the fruit of the Elaeocarpus ganitrus tree

A rudraksha (IAST: rudrākṣa) are the dried stones or seeds of the genus Elaeocarpus specifically, Elaeocarpus ganitrus. These seeds are used as prayer beads for Hindus (especially Shaivas) and Buddhists. When they are ripe, rudraksha stones are covered by a blue outer fruit so they are sometimes called "blueberry beads".

The stones are associated with the Hindu deity Shiva and are worn by believers for protection and for chanting mantras such as Om Namah Shivaya (Sanskrit: ॐ नमः शिवाय; Om Namaḥ Śivāya). They are primarily sourced from India, Indonesia, and Nepal for jewellery and malas (garlands) and valued similarly to semi-precious stones. Rudraksha can have ridges that are termed as "faces" (Sanskrit: मुख, romanized: mukha, lit. 'face') and some people associate the number of faces in a rudraksha with a particular deity.

== Etymology ==
Rudraksha is a Sanskrit compound word consisting of "Rudra"(Sanskrit: रुद्र) referring to Shiva and "akṣa"(Sanskrit: अक्ष) meaning "eye". (Note: Stutley (1985), p. 119:"'Rudra-eyed'. Name of the dark berries of Elaeocarpus ganitrus, used to make Śaiva rosaries (mālā), or necklaces. The berries have five divisions symbolising Śiva's five faces (pañcānana).") Sanskrit dictionaries translate akṣa (Sanskrit: अक्ष) as eyes, as do many prominent Hindus such as Sivaya Subramuniyaswami and Kamal Narayan Seetha; accordingly, rudraksha may be interpreted as meaning "Eye of Rudra".

== Description ==
=== Rudraksha tree ===
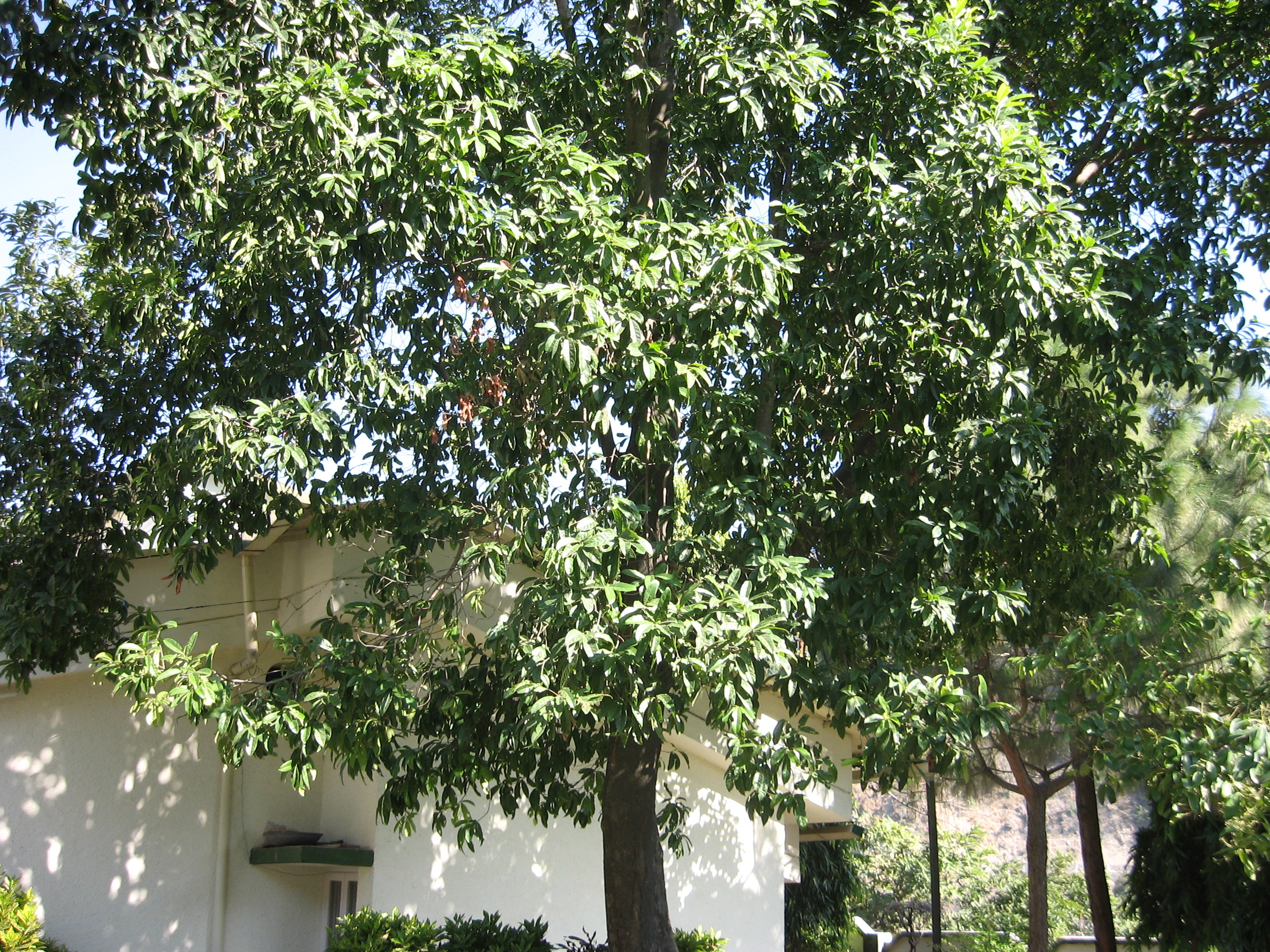
Rudraksha tree, Elaeocarpus ganitrus

Of the 300 species of Elaeocarpus, 35 are found in India. The principal species of this genus is Elaeocarpus ganitrus, which has the common name of "rudraksha tree", and is found from the Indo-Gangetic Plain in the foothills of the Himalayas to Nepal, South and Southeast Asia, parts of Australia, Guam, and Hawaii.

Elaeocarpus ganitrus trees grow to 60–80 ft (18–24 m). They are evergreen trees which grow quickly, and as they mature their roots form buttresses, rising up near the trunk and radiating out along the surface of the ground.

=== Fruit ===
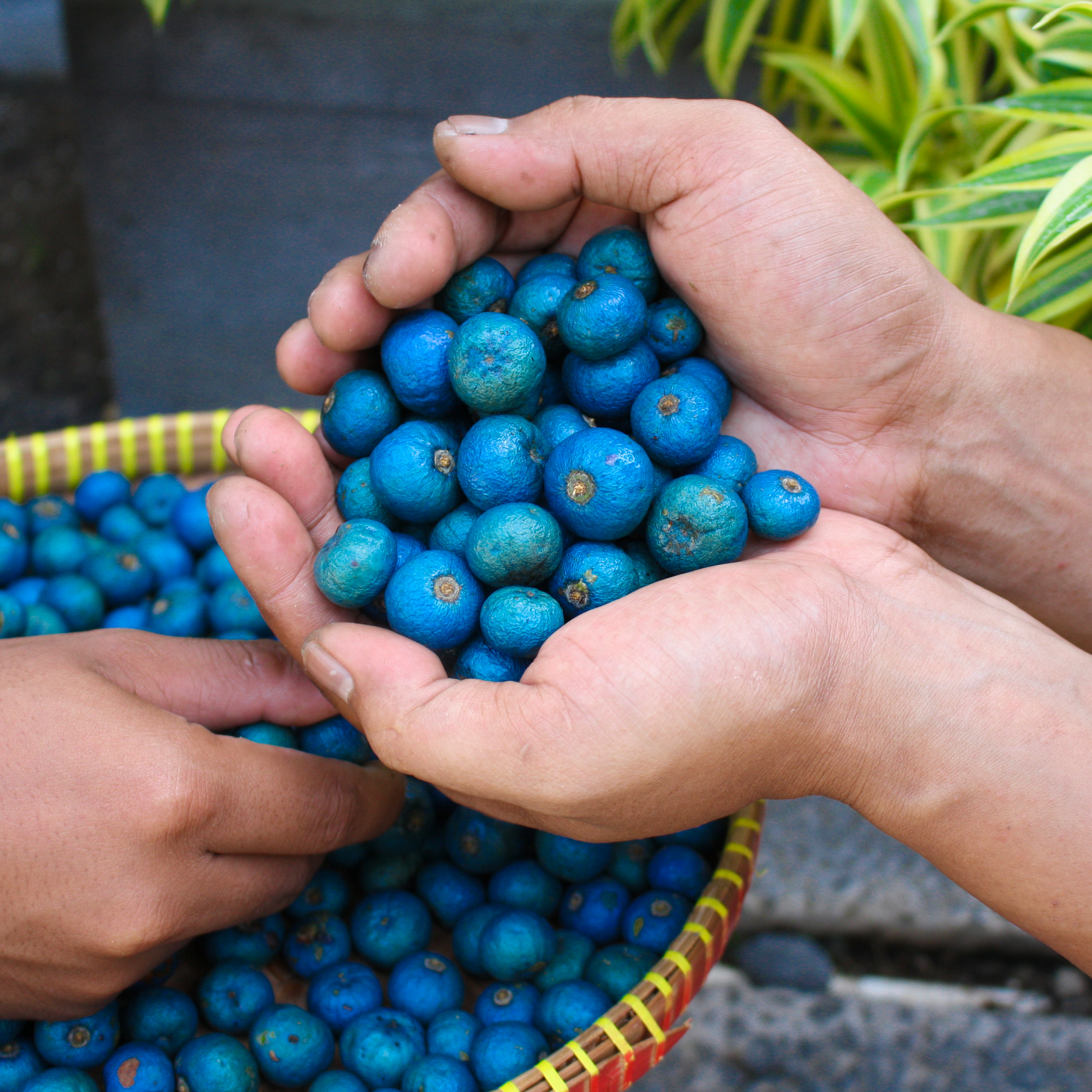
Ripe rudraksha fruits displaying their typical blue colour

The rudraksha tree starts bearing drupes (fruit) in three to four years from germination. It yields between 1,000 and 2,000 fruits annually. These fruits are commonly called "rudraksha fruit", but are also known as amritaphala (fruits of ambrosia).

The pyrena of the fruit, commonly called the "pit" or "stone", is typically divided into multiple segments by seed-bearing locules. When the fruit is fully ripe, the stones are covered with a blue outer fleshy husk of inedible fruit. The blue colour is not derived from a pigment but is due to structural colouration. Rudraksha beads are sometimes called "blueberry beads" in reference to the blue colour of the fruit.

==== Chemical composition ====
Rudraksha fruits contain alkaloids, flavonoids, tannins, steroids, triterpenes, carbohydrates, and cardiac glycosides. They also contain rudrakine, an alkaloid which had been discovered in rudraksha fruit in 1979.

=== Types of rudraksha beads ===
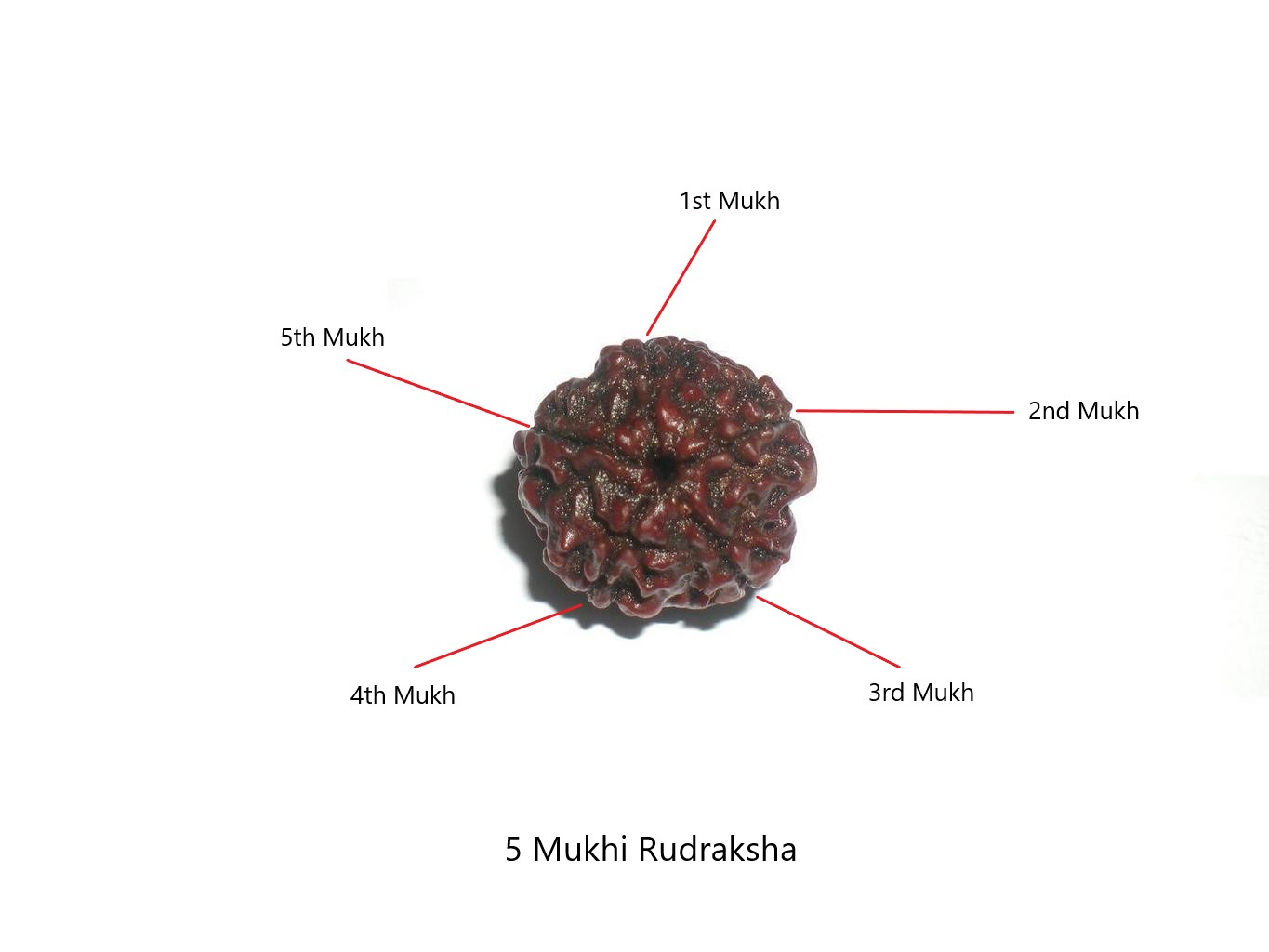
5-faced (panchamukha) rudraksha stone with the lines delineating its faces labelled

Rudraksha beads are described as having a number of facets or "faces" (mukha/mukhi) which are separated by a line or cleft along the bead. Typically, these beads possess between 1 and 21 faces, although instances of rudrakshas with up to 26–27 faces have been reported, albeit rarely. Those with a single face (ekamukha) are the rarest. A rudraskha with eleven faces is worn by renunciants, those who are married wear a two-faced bead and a five-faced bead is representative of Hanuman. Rudrakshas from Nepal are between 20 and 35 mm (0.79 and 1.38 in) and those from Indonesia are between 5 and 25 mm (0.20 and 0.98 in).

Many types of stone are described. A savar is a type of rudraksha bead that is naturally conjoined, or attached to another bead. Gauri Shankar refers to two beads which are naturally conjoined and both beads are somewhat of similar sizes. Garbha Gauri is also naturally joined two beads but one bead is smaller and other is larger. Ganesha refers to beads which have a trunk-like protrusion on their bodies. Trijuti refers to three beads that are naturally conjoined. Other rare types include veda (4 conjoined savars) and dvaita (2 conjoined savars).

== Uses ==
=== Religious uses in Indian-origin religions ===
The rudraksha is sacred to and popularly worn by devotees of Shiva.

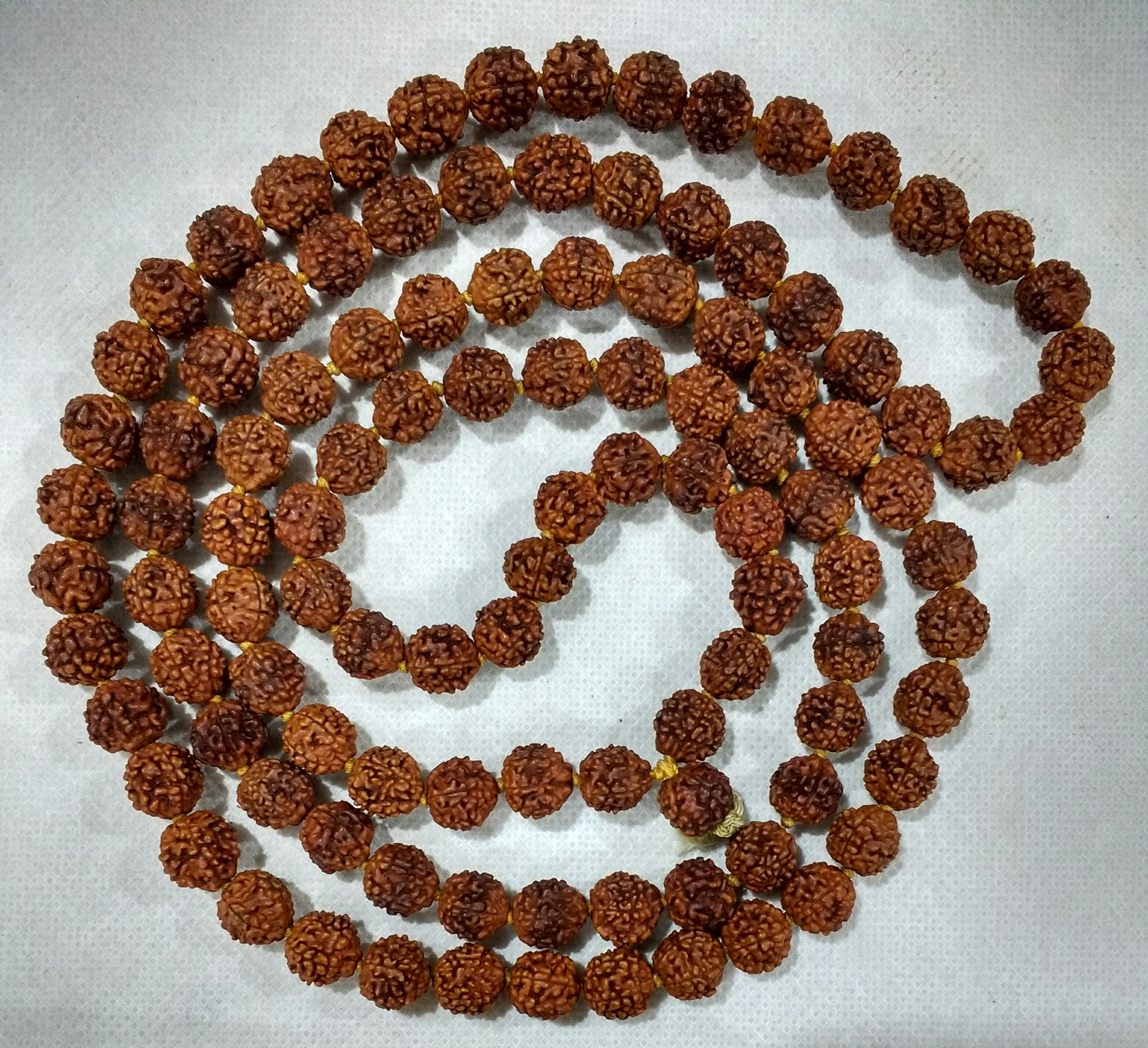
A 108+1 rudraksha mala constructed with 5-faced stones

Rudraksha beads may be strung together as beads on a garland (mala) which can be worn around the neck. The beads are commonly strung on silk, or on a black or red cotton thread. Less often, jewellers use copper, silver or gold wires. The rudraksha beads may be damaged if strung too tightly. The Devi Bhagavata Purana describes the preparation of rudraksha garlands.

Hindus often use rudraksha garlands aids to prayer and meditation, and to sanctify the mind, body, and soul, much as Christians use prayer beads and rosaries to count repetitions of prayer. There is a long tradition of wearing 108 rudraksha beads in India, particularly within Shaivism, due to their association with Shiva, who wears rudraksha garlands. Most garlands contain 108 beads plus one because as 108 is considered sacred and a suitable number of times to recite a short mantra. The number 108 is sacred in many spiritual traditions, symbolising the universe’s completeness. The extra bead, which is called the "meru", bindu, or "guru bead", helps mark the beginning and end of a cycle of 108 and has symbolic value as a 'principle' bead. Rudraksha garlands usually contain beads in combinations 27+1, 54+1, or 108+1. The mantra Om Namah Shivaya, associated with Shiva, is often chosen for repetitions (japa) using rudraksha beads.

== History ==
=== In Hindu religious texts ===
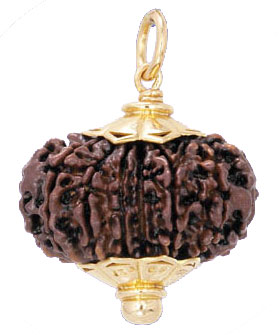
14-faced rudraksha stone made into a pendant.

==== Upanishads ====
Several late-medieval Upanishads describe the construction, wearing, and use rudraksha garlands as well as their mythological origin as the tears of Rudra.

Sage Guha replied: (It is made of any one of the following 10 materials) Coral, Pearl, Crystal, Conch, Silver, Gold, Sandal, Putra-Jivika, Lotus, or Rudraksha. Each head must be devoted and thought of as presided over by the deities of Akara to Kshakara. Golden thread should bind the beads through the holes. On its right silver (caps) and left copper. The face of a bead should face, the face of another head and tail, the tail. Thus a circular formation must be made. (Note: तं गुहः प्रत्युवाच प्रवालमौक्तिकस्फटिकशङ्ख रजताष्टापदचन्दनपुत्रजीविकाब्जे रुद्राक्षा इति । आदिक्षान्तमूर्तिः सावधानभावा । सौवर्णं राजतं ताम्रं तन्मुखे मुखं तत्पुच्छे पुच्छं तदन्तरावर्तनक्रमेण योजयेत्)

— Akshamalika Upanishad

Sage Sanatkumara approached Lord Kalagni Rudra and asked him, "Lord, kindly explain to me the method of wearing Rudraksha." What he told him was, "Rudraksha became famous by that name because initially, it was produced from the eyes of Rudra. During the time of destruction and after the act of destruction, when Rudra closed his eye of destruction, Rudraksha was produced from that eye. That is the Rudraksha property of Rudraksha. Just by touching and wearing this Rudraksha, one gets the same effect of giving in charity one thousand cows." (Note: अथ कालाग्निरुद्रं भगवन्तं सनत्कुमारः पप्रच्छाधीहि भगवन्रुद्राक्षधारणविधिं स होवाच रुद्रस्य नयनादुत्पन्ना रुद्राक्षा इति लोके ख्यायन्ते सदाशिवः संहारकाले संहारं कृत्वा संहाराक्षं मुकुलीकरोति तन्नयनाज्जाता रुद्राक्षा इति होवाच तस्माद्रुद्राक्षत्वमिति तद्रुद्राक्षे वाग्विषये कृते दशगोप्रदानेन यत्फलमवाप्नोति तत्फलमश्नुते स एष भस्मज्योती रुद्राक्ष इति तद्रुद्राक्षं करेण स्पृष्ट्वा धारणमात्रेण द्विसहस्रगोप्रदानफलं भवति । तद्रुद्राक्षे एकादशरुद्रत्वं च गच्छति । तद्रुद्राक्षे शिरसि धार्यमाणे कोटिगोप्रदानफलं भवति)

— Brihajjabala Upanishad

He should count using a rosary (mala) whose beads are either made of the tulsi plant or rudraksha.

— Rama Rahasya Upanishad

After prostrating himself before the celebrated form of Sri Mahadeva-Rudra in his heart, adoring the sacred Bhasma and Rudraksha and mentally reciting the great Mahavakya-Mantra, Tarasara, Sage Shuka asked his father Geat Sage Vyasa. (Note: हृदयं कुण्डली भस्मरुद्राक्षगणदर्शनम् । तारसारं महावाक्यं पञ्चब्रह्माग्निहोत्रकम्)

— Rudrahridaya Upanishad

Sage Bhusunda questioned Lord Kalagni-Rudra: What is the beginning of Rudraksha beads? What is the benefit of wearing them on the body? Lord Kalagni-Rudra answered him thus: I closed my eyes for the sake of destroying the Tripurasura. From my eyes thus closed, drops of water fell on the earth. These drops of tears turned into Rudrakshas. By the mere utterance of the name of 'Rudraksha', one acquires the benefit of giving ten cows in charity. By seeing and touching it, one attains double that benefit. I am unable to praise it anymore.

— Rudrakshajabala Upanishad

==== Tirumurai ====
Like the Upanishads, the Tirumurai describes the wearing of rudraksha garlands and their use as prayer beads for chanting mantras. Accordingly, the Tirumurai identifies wearing a pair of rudraksha garlands as a sign of piety.

They who walk the twin paths of charya and kriya ever praise the twin feet of the Lord. They wear holy emblems—the twin rings in earlobes, the twin rudraksha garland around the neck—and adopt the twin mudras, all in amiable constancy.

— Tirumantiram 1423. TM

Thinking of Him, great love welling up in their heart, if they finger the rudraksha beads, it will bring them the glory of the Gods. Chant our naked Lord's name. Say, "Namah Shivaya!"

— Tirumurai 3.307.3. PS, 217

== Cultivation ==
=== Herbal and sacred groves ===
Ch. Devi Lal Rudraksha Vatika, is a 184 acres (0.74 km^{2}) grove dedicated to rudraksha which also has over 400 endangered ayurvedic medicinal herbs in Yamunanagar district of Haryana state in India.

Rudraksha is primarily cultivated in the foothills of the Himalayas, mainly in Nepal and India. The most popular varieties of rudraksha are found in the regions of Kathmandu, around Arun Valley Region in Nepal and Kulu, and Rameshwaram in India. There are several naturally occurring trees of rudrakshas in the alpine forests of Dhauladhar and lower Shivalik ranges of the Himalayas.

Groves are mostly found in Uttarakhand state of India.

== Gallery ==
=== Tree ===
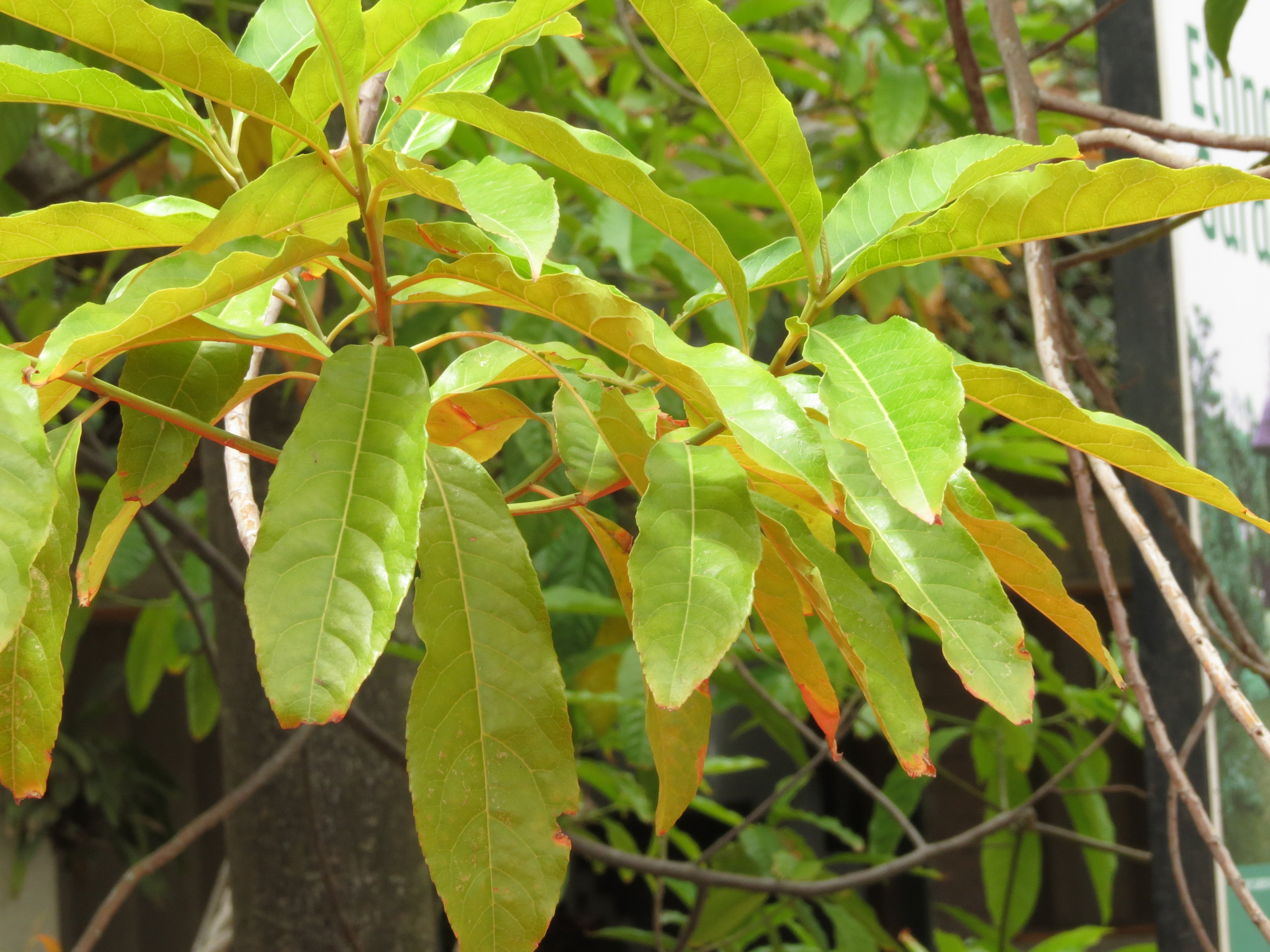
Rudraksha tree leaves

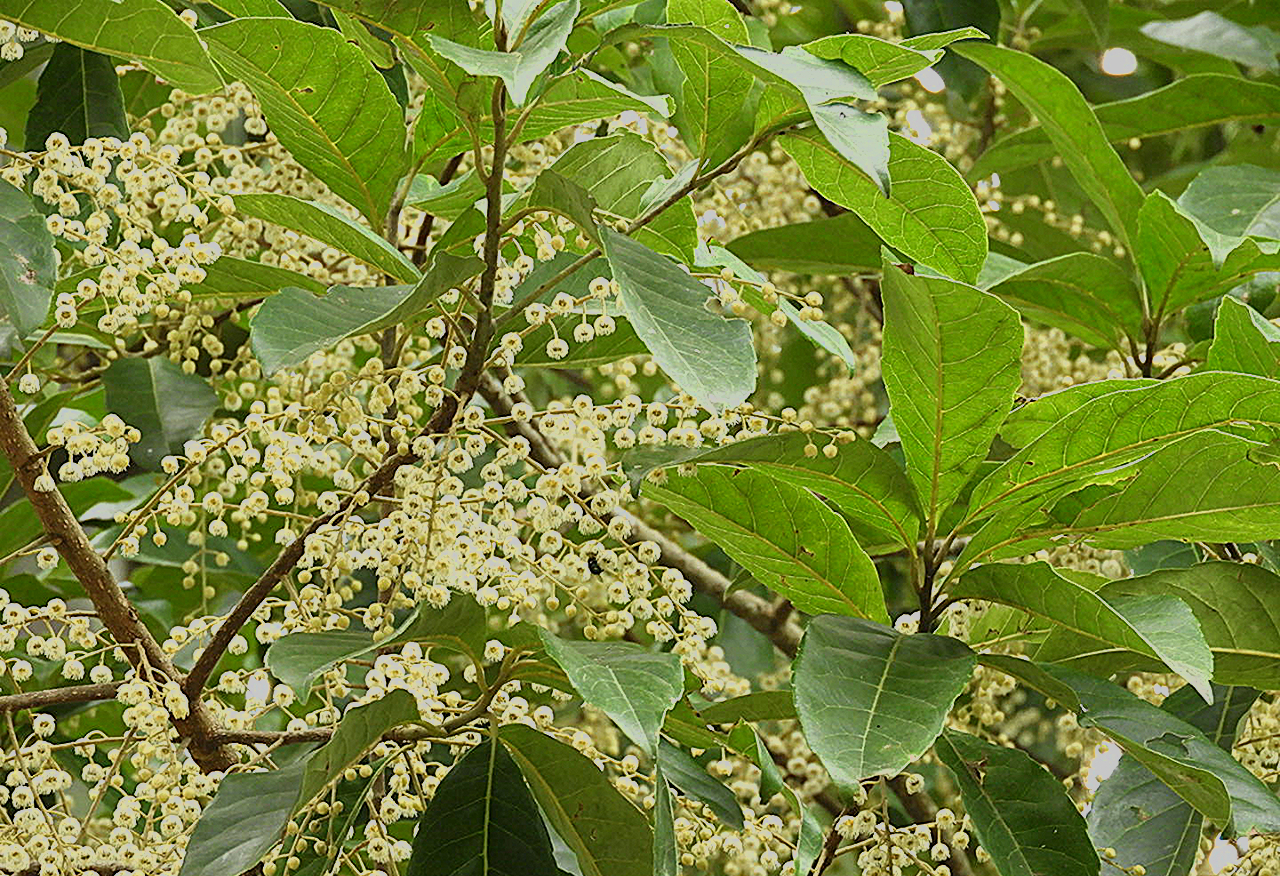
Rudraksha tree with flowers

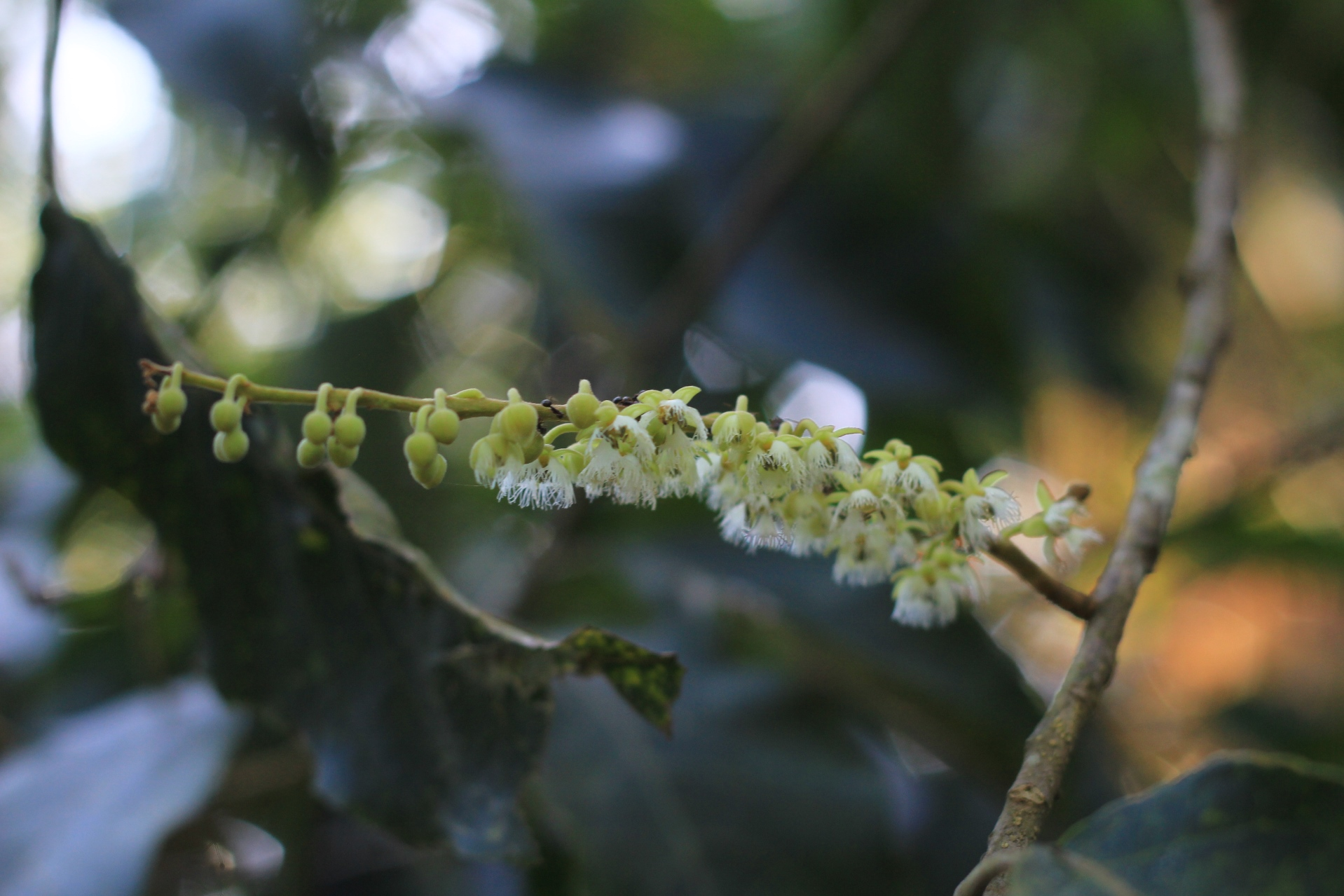
Rudraksha flowers

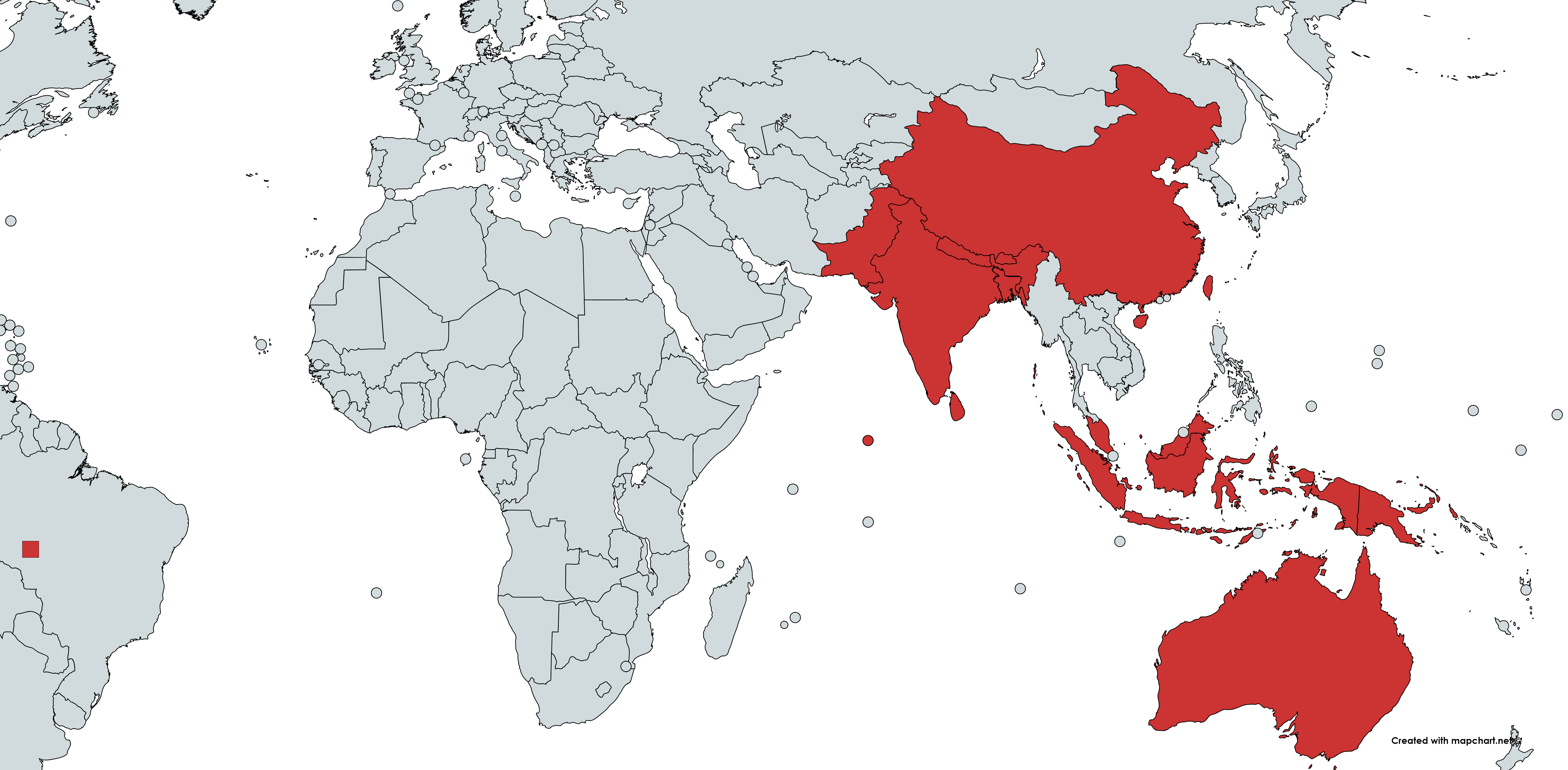
Countries to which Elaeocarpus ganitrus is native.

=== Fruit ===
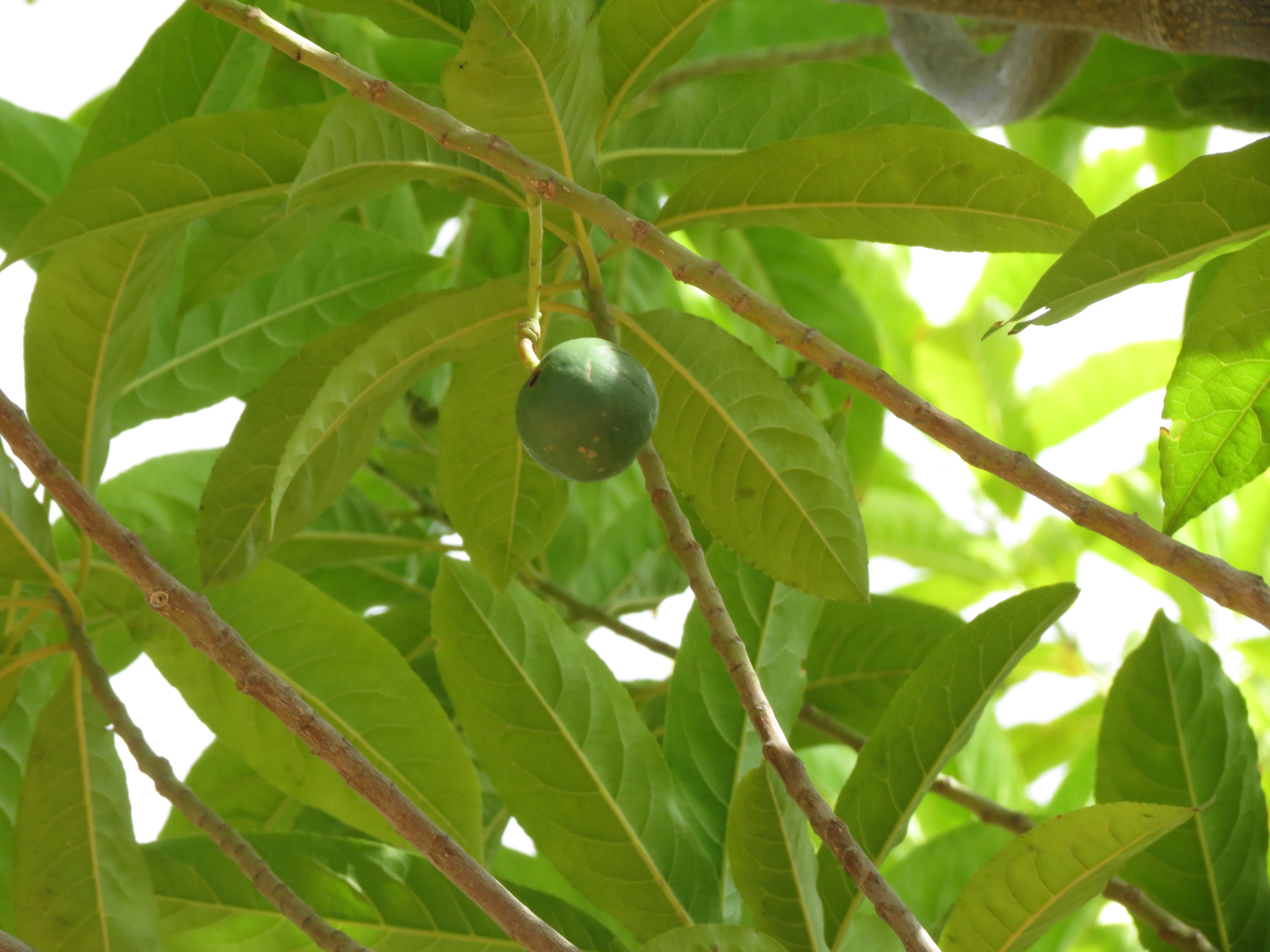
Unripe rudraksha fruit on the tree

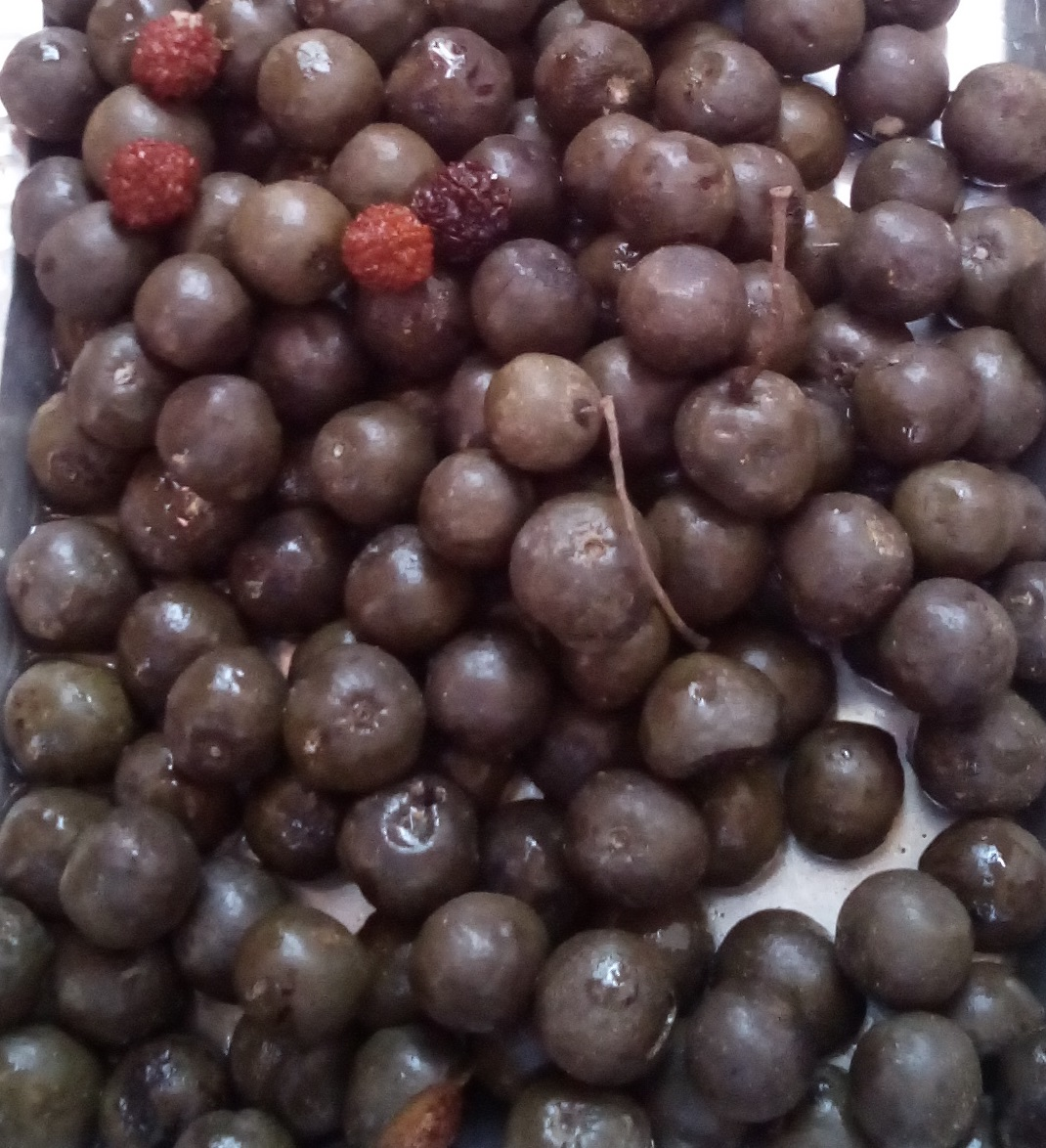
On drying rudraksha fruits turn black

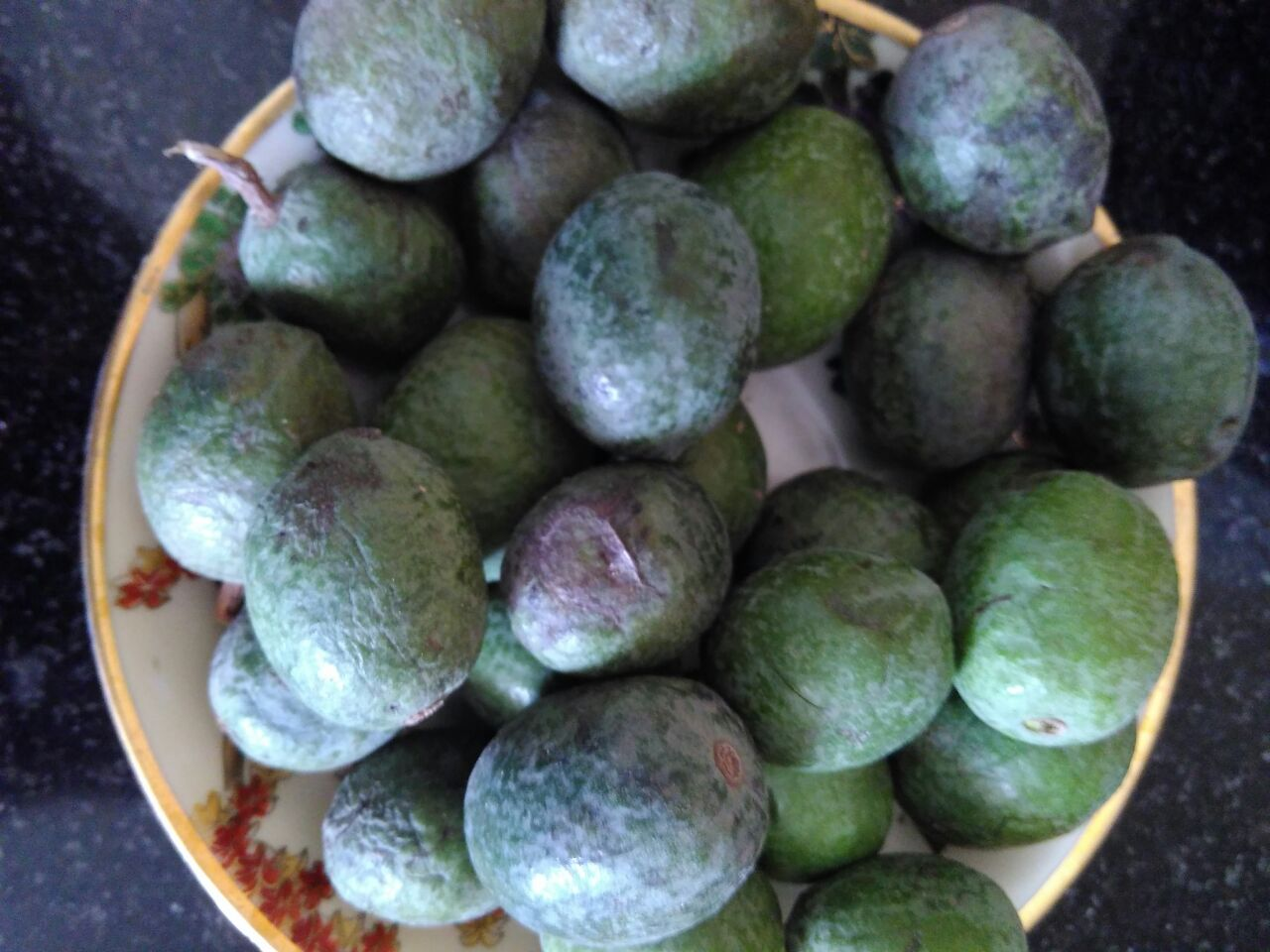
Freshly plucked raw rudraksha fruits; when ripe these are blue in colour

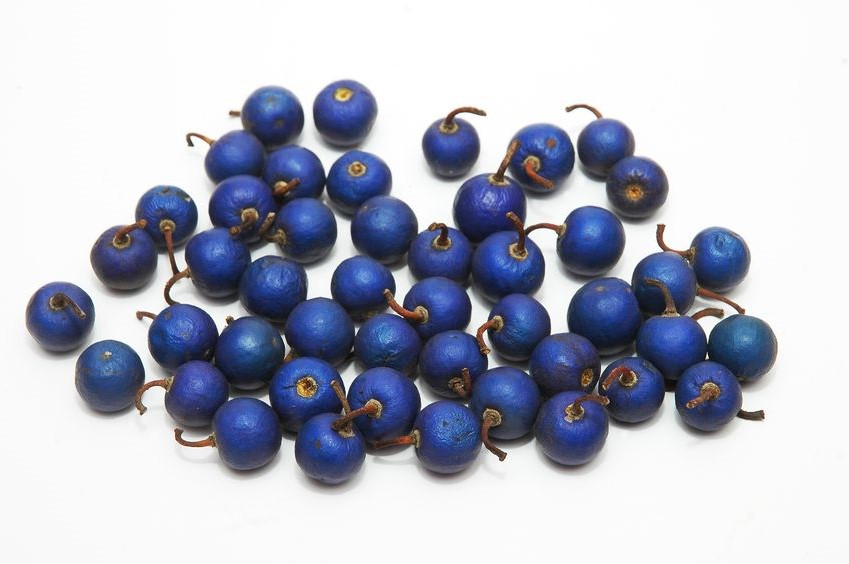
Ripe rudraksha fruits with typical blue colour

=== Stones ===
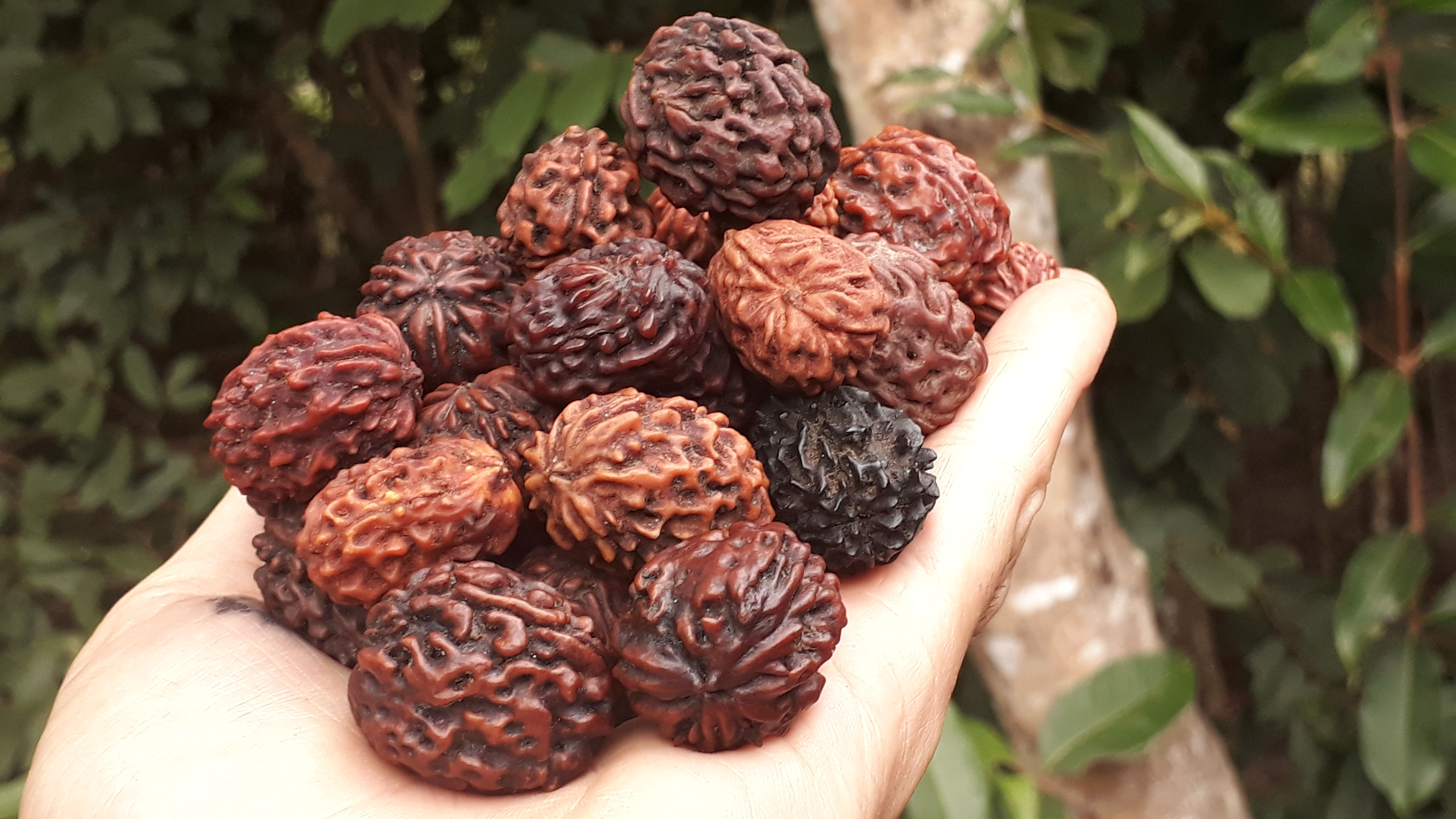
Handful of rudraksha stones

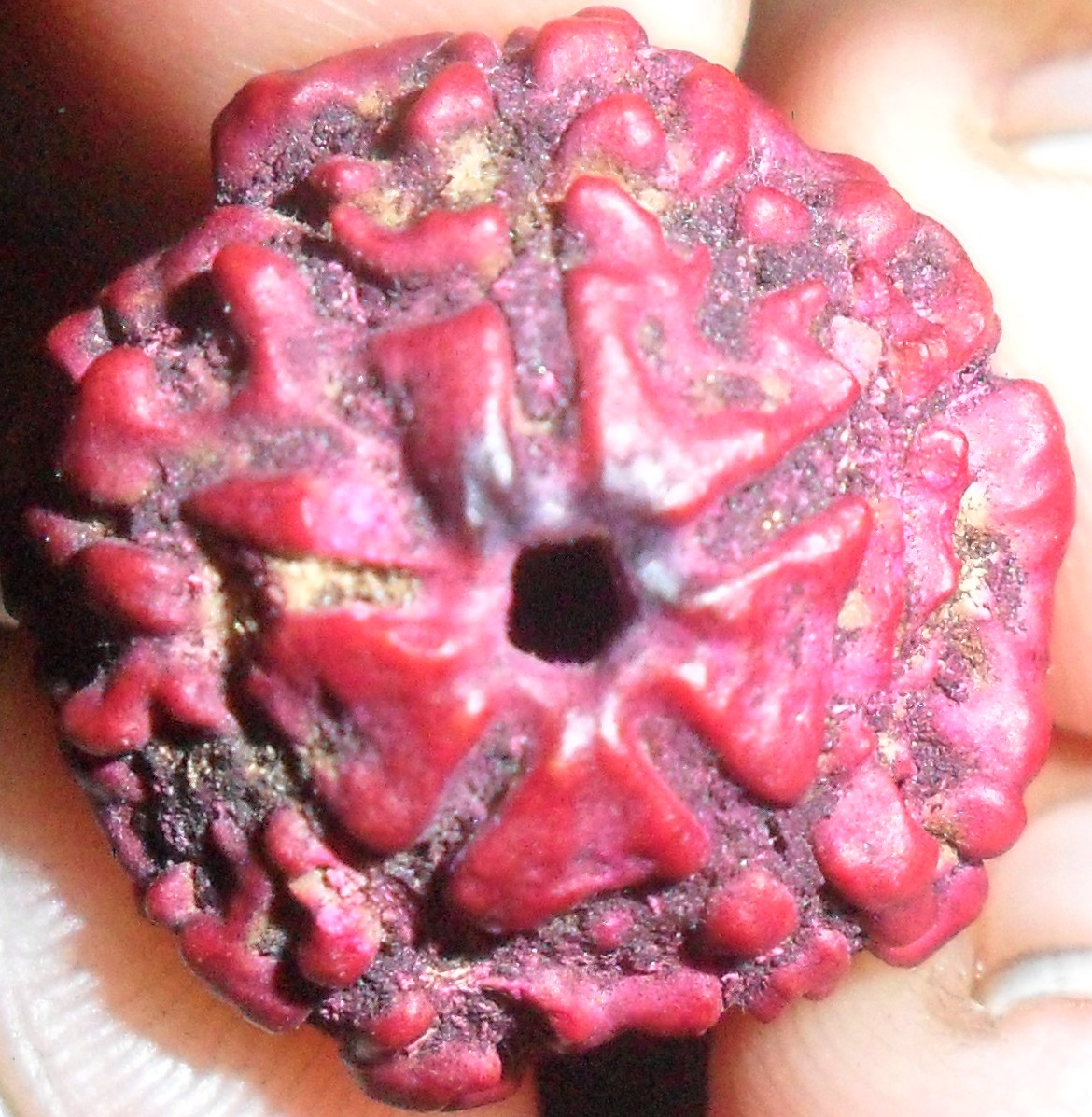
Red 5-faced rudraksha stone

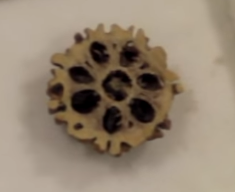
Cross-section of a 7-faced rudraksha stone

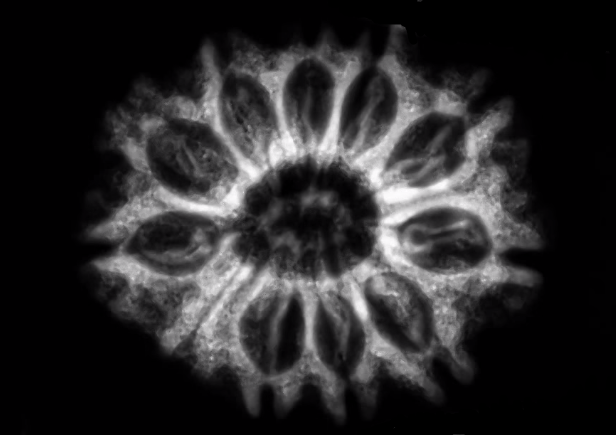
X-ray of 10-faced rudraksha stone reveals 10 seeds storing chambers (locules) and one central chamber

== See also ==
- Similar religiously significant natural objects
  - Shaligram
- Associated mantras
  - Om Namah Shivaya
  - Om mani padme hum
- Prayer beads
  - Japamala
  - Misbaha
  - Rosary
- Garlands and beadwork
  - Phuang malai
  - Kombolói
