= Fruit pit carving =

Chinese folk handicraft

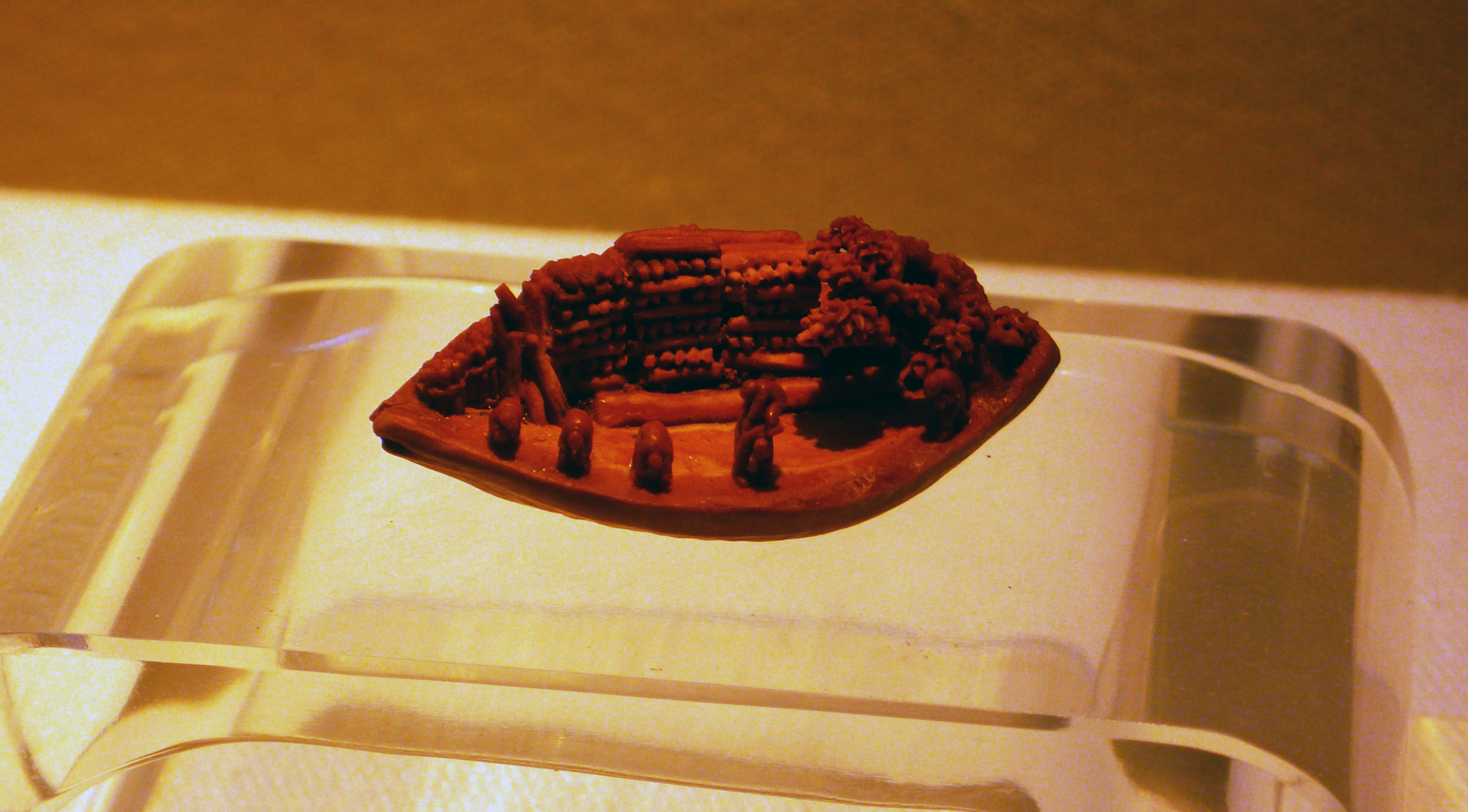
A carved Chinese olive pit at the Hangzhou Arts and Crafts Museum

Fruit pit carving (Chinese: 核雕; pinyin: hédiāo) is a Chinese folk handicraft in which the pits of peach, apricot, walnut, Chinese olive, yumberry and other drupes are used to create minute patterns of the Buddha, nature, or the Chinese zodiac that are said to repel evil spirits. The carved pits are also used to create jewelry and decorations. However, the art is now facing extinction because few black olive trees are planted in China and there are very few people interested in learning this art. Olive core carving has been recognized as an Intangible Cultural Heritage of the Guangdong Province of China.

== History ==
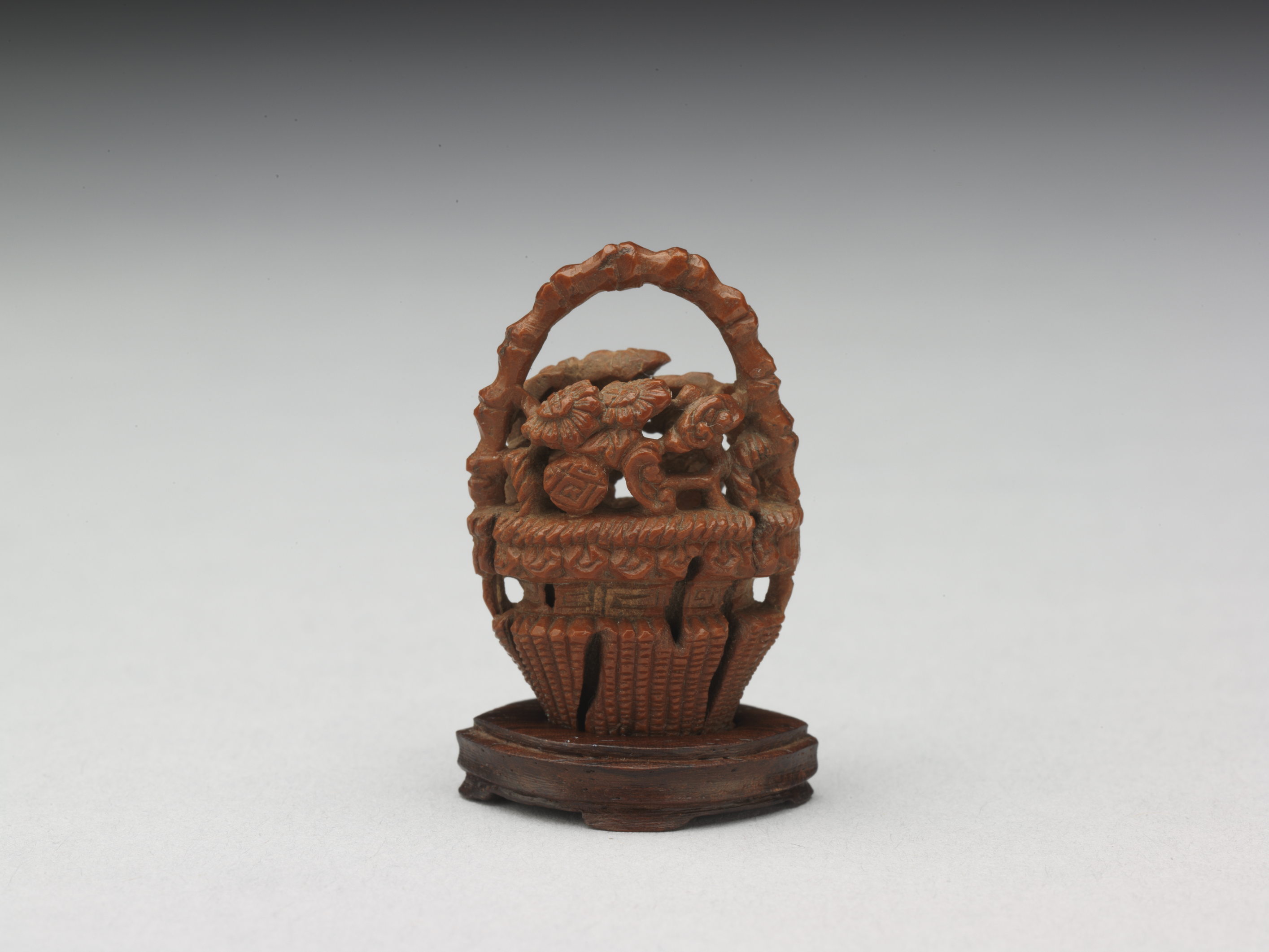
A carved walnut pit at the National Palace Museum in Taipei

Fruit pit carving is a kind of miniature carving, which developed mainly on bamboo and ivory in the Tang and Song dynasties. The earliest record of fruit pit carving was from the Song dynasty. In the mid-Ming to early-Qing dynasty, fruit pit carving advanced greatly to depict increasingly elaborate scenes. These carvings were treasured as ornaments by high-ranking officials and nobles. Many artisans, including carvers, were brought to the Imperial Palace's workshop to produce artworks. Most well-known carvers were from Suzhou or Guangzhou.

Developments in fruit pit carving was tied to microscopes and magnifying glasses, which Western missionaries had brought to China by the early Qing dynasty. Microscopes were not needed by carvers, but were invaluable for appreciating detailed carvings.

Fruit pit carving declined in the late Qing dynasty. After the First and Second Opium Wars, many carvers fled Beijing.

== Famous artists and works ==
=== Wang Shuyuan ===
Wang Shuyuan, a Ming dynasty craftsman from what is now Changshu, Jiangsu Province, created one of the art's masterpieces, a three-centimeter-long peach pit boat in Chibi, Hubei Province, at nighttime. The minute detail of the carved pit includes four working windowpanes, five human figures, flower patterns, and poems. The piece is remembered in "Nut Carving Boat," a literary passage included in some Chinese middle school textbooks.

=== Chen Zihe ===
Lived in Weifang, Shandong Province, during the Qing dynasty.

=== Chen Zuzhang ===
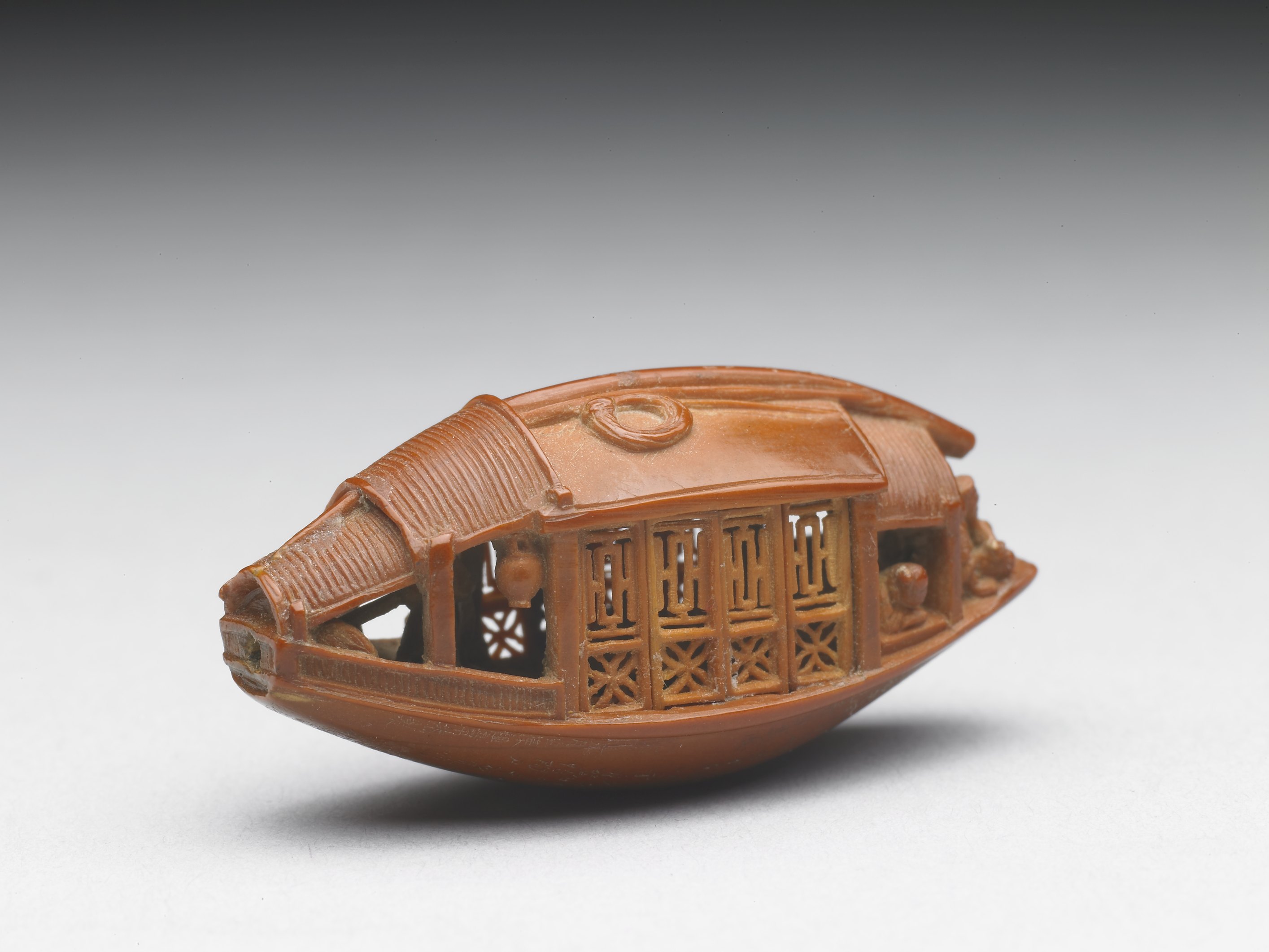
Boat Carved from an Olive Stone by Chen Zuzhang.

Chen was a court artist in the Qing dynasty, best known for Boat Carved from an Olive Stone. Today, the work is part of the collection of the National Palace Museum.

=== Du Langui ===
Lived from 1881 to 1960 in Weifang, Shandong Province.

=== Ding Huaizeng ===
Lived from 1878 to 1940 in Weifang, Shandong Province. He was commemorated for one of his carvings at the Panama–Pacific International Exposition in 1915.

=== Li Chen ===
Li is an artist from Anshan village of Tumen city, Jilin province, China. Li carves peach pits.

== See also ==
- Vegetable ivory – Ivory substitute made from the seeds of certain palm trees
- Wenwan walnuts – Chinese recreational walnuts
