= The Stones =

The Stones may refer to:

- The Rolling Stones, an English rock band formed in the 1960s, commonly referred to as "The Stones"
- The Stones (market), a market in Newcastle-under-Lyme
- The Stones (band), a 1982-1983 band from Dunedin, New Zealand
- The Stones (TV series), a 2004 television sitcom canceled after 10 episodes
- Wealdstone F.C., an English football club nicknamed "The Stones"
- "The Stones", a 1995 Christian song by Ray Boltz
- The Stones, a street in Castleton, Derbyshire.

== See also ==
- Stone (disambiguation)
- The Stone (disambiguation)
- Stones (disambiguation)
