= Strone =

Strone, or Strones, may refer to:

- Strone of Cally, a settlement near Bridge of Cally, Perth and Kinross, Scotland
- Strone, Cowal, a village on the Cowal Peninsula, in Argyll and Bute, Scotland
- Strone, Inverness-shire, a hamlet near Loch Ness, in Inverness-shire, Scotland
- Strones, Döllersheim, a hamlet in Döllersheim, Lower Austria, Austria

== See also ==
- Strone Point (disambiguation)
- Stone (disambiguation)
- Strome (disambiguation)
