= The Stone: Issue Three =

Live album by John Zorn, Lou Reed and Laurie Anderson
- Released: April 2008
- Recorded: January 10, 2008
- Venue: The Stone, New York City
- Genre: Avant-garde
- Length: 48:21
- Label: Tzadik
- Producer: John Zorn

John Zorn chronology
Lucifer: Book of Angels Volume 10 (2008)	The Stone: Issue Three (2008)	Xaphan: Book of Angels Volume 9 (2008)

The Stone Benefit series chronology
The Stone: Issue Two (2007)	The Stone: Issue Three (2008)	The Stone: Issue Four (2010)

The Stone: Issue Three is a limited edition live album of improvised experimental music by John Zorn, Lou Reed and Laurie Anderson recorded at The Stone on January 10, 2008. All proceeds from the sale of this album support The Stone.

== Reception ==
Professional ratings
Review scores
Source	Rating
All About Jazz	2.5/5 stars

Writing for All About Jazz, George Kanzler commented "there are some interesting, even arresting, sonic textures and overtly cinematic (soundwise) moments here, but basically this is freedom run amok".

== Track listing ==
All compositions by Laurie Anderson, Lou Reed and John Zorn

1. "Part 1" - 22:40
2. "Part 2" - 13:04
3. "Part 3" - 12:37

== Personnel ==
- John Zorn – alto saxophone
- Lou Reed – electric guitar
- Laurie Anderson – violin, electronics
