= Old Stone Church =

Old Stone Church may refer to:

In Canada:

- Old Stone Church (Ontario), a National Historic Site of Canada in Ontario

In the United States (by state):

- Old Stone Church (West Boylston, Massachusetts), listed on the National Register of Historic Places (NRHP)
- Old Stone Church or Saint Elizabeth's Church (Tecumseh, Michigan), NRHP-listed
- Old Stone Church (Chesterfield, Missouri), NRHP-listed
- Old Stone Church (Buffalo, North Dakota), NRHP-listed
- Old Stone Church (Cedarville, New Jersey), NRHP-listed
- Old Stone Church (Kingwood Township, New Jersey), NRHP-listed
- Old Stone Church (Upper Saddle River, New Jersey), NRHP-listed
- Old Stone Church (Jamaica, Queens), New York
- Old Stone Church or Evangelical Lutheran Church of St. Peter, Rhinebeck, New York, NRHP-listed
- Old Stone Church (Cleveland, Ohio), NRHP-listed
- Old Stone Church and Cemetery, Clemson, South Carolina, NRHP-listed
- Old Stone Church Archeological Site (44LD376), Leesburg, Virginia, NRHP-listed
- Old Stone Church (White Hall, Virginia), NRHP-listed
- Old Stone Church (Winchester, Virginia), NRHP-listed
- Old Stone Church (Lewisburg, West Virginia), NRHP-listed

== See also ==
- Old Providence Stone Church, Spottswood, Virginia, NRHP-listed
- Old Stone Congregational Church, Lyons, Colorado, NRHP-listed
- Old Stone Union Church, Long Valley, New Jersey, NRHP-listed
- Stone Church (disambiguation)
