= Boat Carved from an Olive Stone =

Ganlan Olive Stone Miniature Boat
- 雕橄欖核舟 (Chinese)
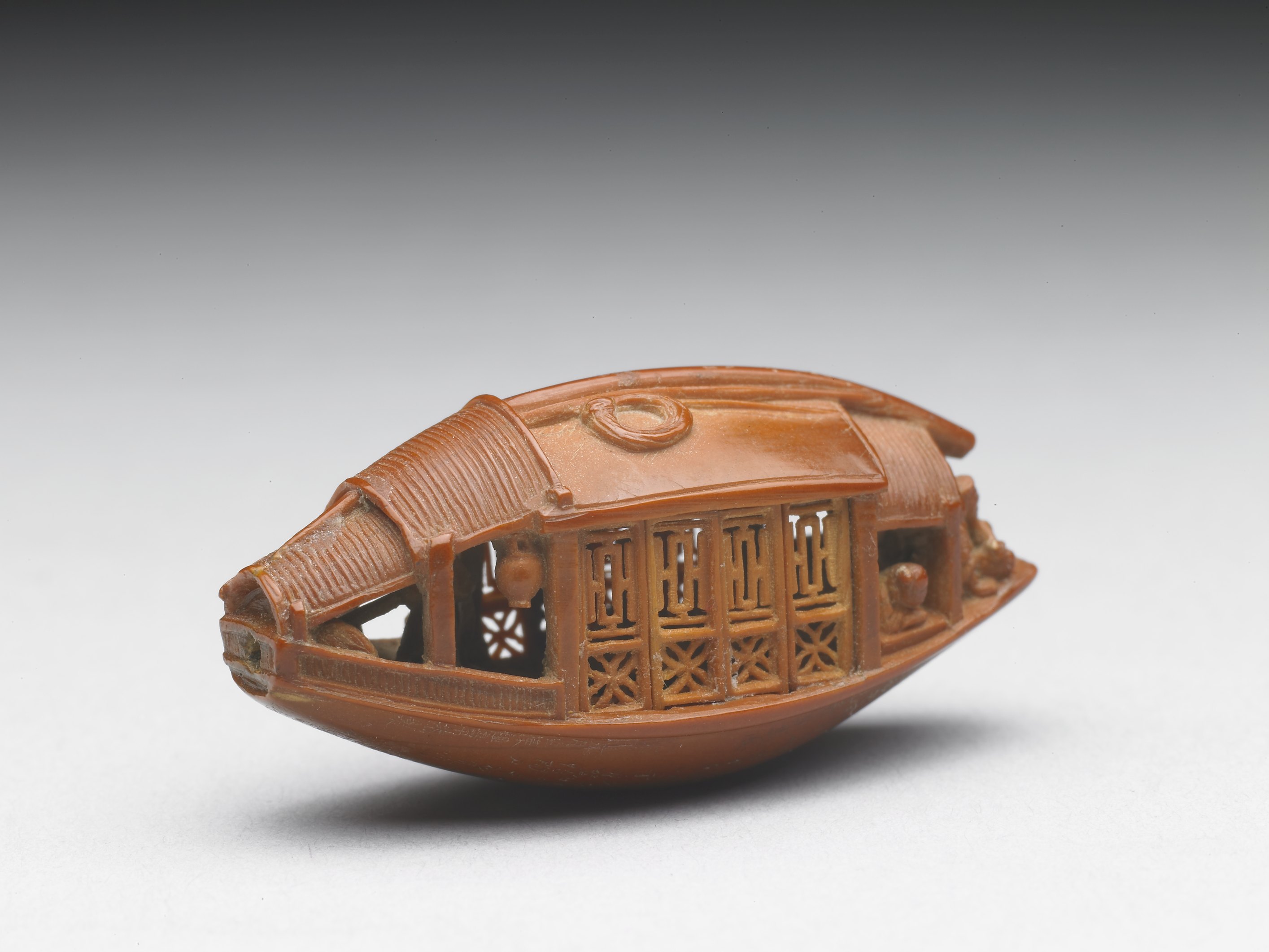
- Artist: Chen Zuzhang (陳祖章)
- Year: 1737
- Type: Sculpture
- Medium: Olive pit
- Dimensions: 1.6 cm × 1.4 cm × 3.4 cm (0.63 in × 0.55 in × 1.3 in)
- Location: National Palace Museum, Taipei

The Boat Carved from an Olive Stone (Chinese: 雕橄欖核舟) is a fruit pit carving of a boat made out of an olive pit. It is part of the collection of the National Palace Museum in Taipei, Taiwan.

== Description ==
The boat is a miniature carving of an olive pit, measuring only 1.4 by 3.4 centimetres (0.55 by 1.34 in) and is only 1.6 centimetres (0.63 in) tall. Inside the boat, there are a total of eight figures, with the Song dynasty poet Su Tung-po sitting beside the window at the table. The sculpture features incredibly detailed carvings of windows on the side, with the center two panels movable. On top of the boat is a rolled up sail in rope.

The full text of Su Tung-po's Latter Ode on the Red Cliff of more than 300 characters is engraved in details on the bottom of the boat, demonstrating the expert craftsmanship of the artist. The poem depicts the poet enjoying a boat ride with his friends on a full moon night at the site of Battle of Red Cliffs. The artist, Chen, recreated a miniature moment, with the boat being a symbol of seclusion holding men safely on top of life and water.

== History ==
The boat was carved in the second year of Qianlong Emperor's reign (1737) by the sculptor Chen Zuzhang. Chen, originally from Canton, had entered the Imperial Bureau of Manufacture during the reign of Yongzheng Emperor. In 1737, The artist carved the boat out of a pit of an olive, taking advantage of its shape. Following the fall of the Qing Empire in the 1911 Revolution, the sculpture became part of the collection of the Palace Museum in the Forbidden City. Along with a core of that collection, the piece survived the Second Sino-Japanese War (World War II) and the Chinese Civil War and was eventually relocated to Taiwan's National Palace Museum.
