= Old Stone Tavern =

Old Stone Tavern may refer to:

- Old Stone Tavern (Little Creek, Delaware)
- Old Stone Tavern (Frankfort, Kentucky)
- Old Stone Tavern (Pittsburgh), Pennsylvania
- Old Stone Tavern (Atkins, Virginia)
- Old Stone Tavern (Moorefield, West Virginia)
- Old Talbott Tavern, in Bardstown, Kentucky
