= Old Stone Arch Bridge =

Old Stone Arch Bridge may refer to:

- Old Stone Arch Bridge (Clark Center, Illinois)
- Old Stone Arch (Marshall, Illinois), a stone arch bridge
- Old Stone Arch Bridge (Bound Brook, New Jersey)
- Old Stone Arch Bridge (Lewistown, Pennsylvania)
