= Old Stone Store =

Old Stone Store may refer to:

- Old Stone Store, or Clarendon Stone Store, Clarendon, New York, listed on the NRHP in Orleans County, New York
- Rollin Sprague Building, Rochester, Michigan, also known as the Old Stone Store, listed on the NRHP in Oakland County, Michigan

== See also ==
- Old Stone Shop, Lyme, New York, NRHP listed building
- Old Rainworth Stone Store (built 1862) Cairdbeign, Central Highlands Region, Queensland, Australia
- Old Stone Blacksmith Shop, Cornwall, Vermont, NRHP listed building
- Stone Store, New Zealand's oldest stone building
