= Tjakkatjakka Ston =

- Abandoned village
- Location in Suriname
- Coordinates: 5°12′N 56°6′W
- Country: Suriname
- District: Sipaliwini District
- Resort (municipality): Boven Coppename
- Elevation: 75 ft (23 m)
- Time zone: UTC-3

Tjakkatjakka Ston was a village in the Boven Coppename resort of the Sipaliwini District in Suriname. According to Dirk van der Elst, the village had been abandoned and already been taken over by the jungle in 1973.

== Bibliography ==
- Elst, Dirk van der (1973). "The Coppename Kwinti: Notes on an Afro-American tribe in Suriname". Nieuwe West-Indische Gids - Year 15. University of Florida.
