= Mark Strome =

American entrepreneur and philanthropist

- Born: c. 1956
- Education: Old Dominion University
- Occupations: Entrepreneur and philanthropist

Mark Strome (born 20th century) is an American entrepreneur and philanthropist. He is the founder, chief investment officer and chairman of Strome Investment Management.

== Early life and education ==
Born in New York, Strome grew up on his family's dairy farm in Warsaw, New York. In 1974, he graduated from Warsaw High School.

Strome received a degree in civil engineering from Old Dominion University, and graduated with honors in 1978. Thereafter, he studied economics at University of California, Berkeley receiving his MA with honors. Strome was awarded an honorary doctorate in 1998 from Old Dominion University. In 2014 the Old Dominion University College of Business and Public Administration was renamed the Strome College of Business.

== Career ==
Strome created Strome Investment Management, an early hedge fund that invested internationally with a global macroeconomic focus.

Strome has created and incubated numerous publicly traded companies and several private companies.

Currently he is founder, principal owner and chairman of HyperX logic , a semiconductor design company focused on space and defense applications

== Philanthropy ==
The Strome Family Foundation was established in 1993 to support community programs addressing local needs to larger global issues, primarily in education, the arts, and medical research.

Strome donated $4 million to Johns Hopkins for hematological research in 2006.

In September 2014, the foundation pledged $11 million to endow the Strome Entrepreneurial Center at Old Dominion University, his alma mater, in support of a new, multi-pronged program to nurture business entrepreneurs. The program encourages a formal way of linking mentors with promising students.

== Personal life ==
Strome has four sons and one daughter and lives in Los Angeles, California.

== See also ==
- List of Old Dominion University alumni
- List of people from New York
- List of philanthropists
- List of University of California, Berkeley alumni
