= Strome Park =

Park in Oregon, United States

- Location within Oregon
- Type: Public, state
- Location: Lincoln County, Oregon
- Nearest city: Siletz, Lincoln County, Oregon. USA
- Coordinates: 44°48′49″N 123°58′14″W
- Area: 2.6 acres (1.1 ha)
- Operator: Lincoln County Parks

Strome Park is a public park in Lincoln County, Oregon, United States. It is located about ten miles north of Siletz. Some maps show it as Mowrey Landing.

== Description ==
The park has an area of about 2.6 acres and the Siletz River runs through the park. The facilities have been improved recently, paid for by the Department of Fish and Wildlife in Lincoln County and the State Marine Board.

== Amenities ==
The park has the following amenities on a day use only basis, free of charge:

- 25 parking spaces for vehicles
- boat ramp into the Siletz River
- restrooms
- picnic tables and large grass area for games
- fishing (chinook and steelhead)

The river current is moderately strong, so care is needed when launching a boat from here. When returning to land at the Strome Park ramp it is advisable to watch carefully for the ramp, as it is easy to miss.
