= Old Stone Vineyard and Winery =

Coordinates: 35.5976°N 80.4260°W

Old Stone Winery is a family-owned winery estate located outside of Salisbury, NC. Sited on 130 acres (0.53 km^{2}) of land, and with more than 20 acres (0.081 km^{2}) of vineyard, it was founded in 2001 by Mark Brown and Stefon Lira, Barbara and Marcus Brown.

== Types of wine ==
The vineyard and winery produces a blend of native, American, and European wines ranging from Chardonnay to Merlot. Selections of wines are taken from the native muscadine growths of the North Carolina region.

Old Stone's Sweet Muscadine won highest honors in two categories in the commercial division of the 2008 North Carolina State Fair Wine Competition.
