= Old Stone Fort =

Old Stone Fort may refer to:

- An Old Stone Fort located in Schoharie, New York.
- The Old Stone Fort, an ancient Native American structure near Manchester, Tennessee.
- Old Stone Fort, an old fort in Massachusetts
- Old Stone Fort Museum located on the campus of Stephen F. Austin State University, Nacogdoches, Texas
- Old Stone Fort (Coshocton, Ohio), possibly the oldest surviving building in the state of Ohio. Allegedly built by French in 1679.
