= Pyrena =

Pit or stone within some fruits

Diagram of a typical drupe, in this case a peach, illustrating the layers of both the fruit and the seed; the pyrene is the hardened endocarp which encloses the seed

A pyrena (/paɪˈriːnə/) (pl. pyrenae) or pyrene, commonly called a pit or stone, is the fruitstone inside certain types of fruit, namely drupes or drupelets, and consists of a hardened shell-like layer surrounding one or more seeds (also called the "kernel"). It is produced by the hardening of the inner lining tissue of the fruit, called the endocarp. This hardened structure provides a protective physical barrier around the seed, shielding it from pathogens and herbivory.

== Development ==
The hardening of the endocarp of a developing drupe occurs via secondary cell wall formation and lignification. The biopolymer lignin, also found in wood, provides a structure within secondary cell walls which supports the polymerisation of cellulose and hemicellulose; together these polymers provide the endocarp with tensile strength and stiffness. Further hardening occurs during the biomineralisation of the endocarp. The biomineralisation of pyrenes during the life of the plant can aid the preservation of fruit remains in archaeological findings.

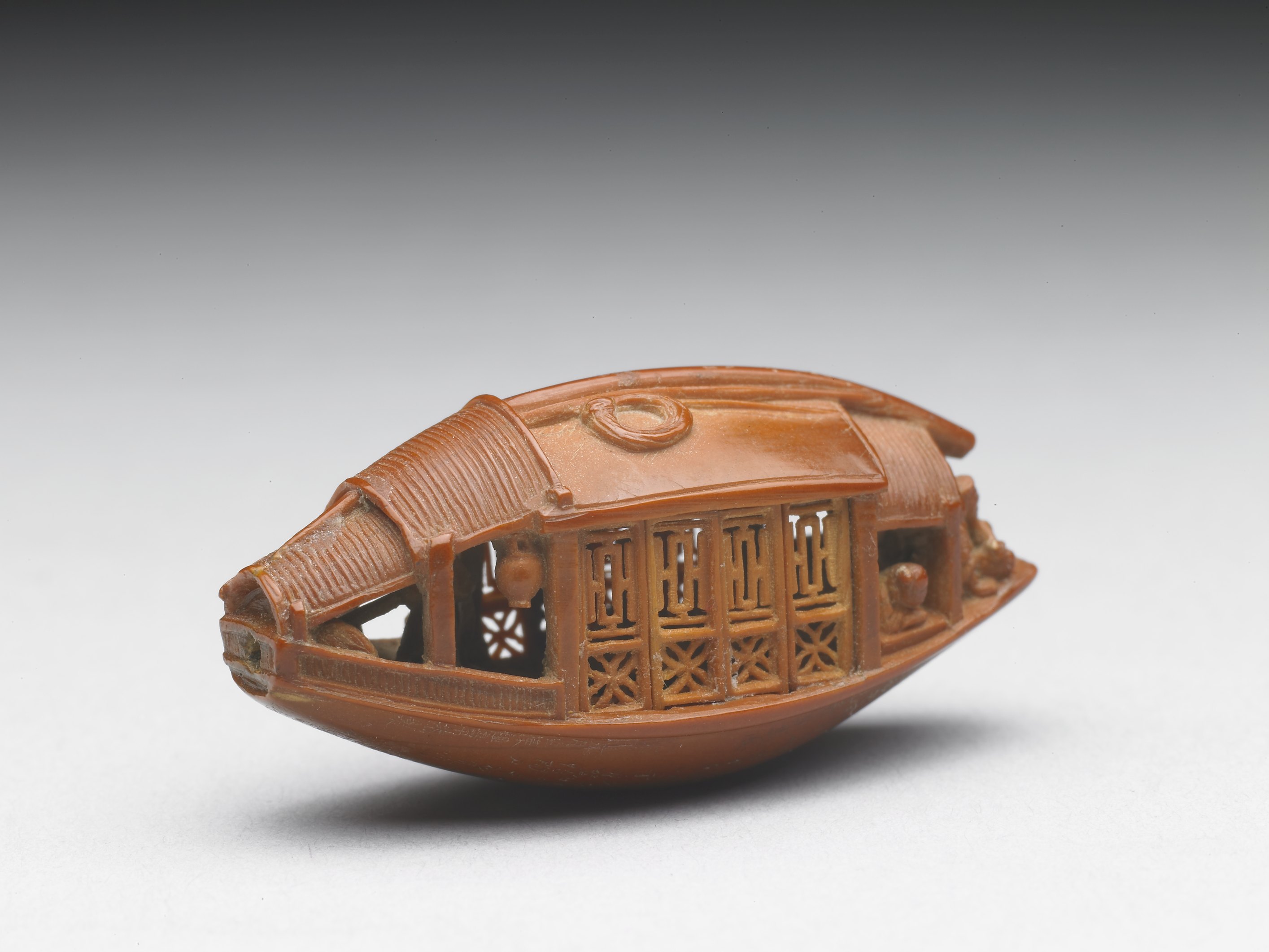
Boat Carved from an Olive Stone, at the National Palace Museum. Taiwan

== Uses and culture ==
Pyrenes have been employed worldwide in many cultures for many uses. The stones of some fruits, such as peaches, are sometimes used to infuse flavours into foods and drinks, including peach pit jelly, vinegar, and alcoholic beverages like ratafia. In China fruitstones are used in a traditional folk handicraft, namely fruit pit carving (核雕), to make jewellery and sculptures. Shaivite and Buddhist practitioners use the stones of the fruit of Elaeocarpus angustifolius, called rudraksha, as prayer beads for akshamala.

== Gallery ==
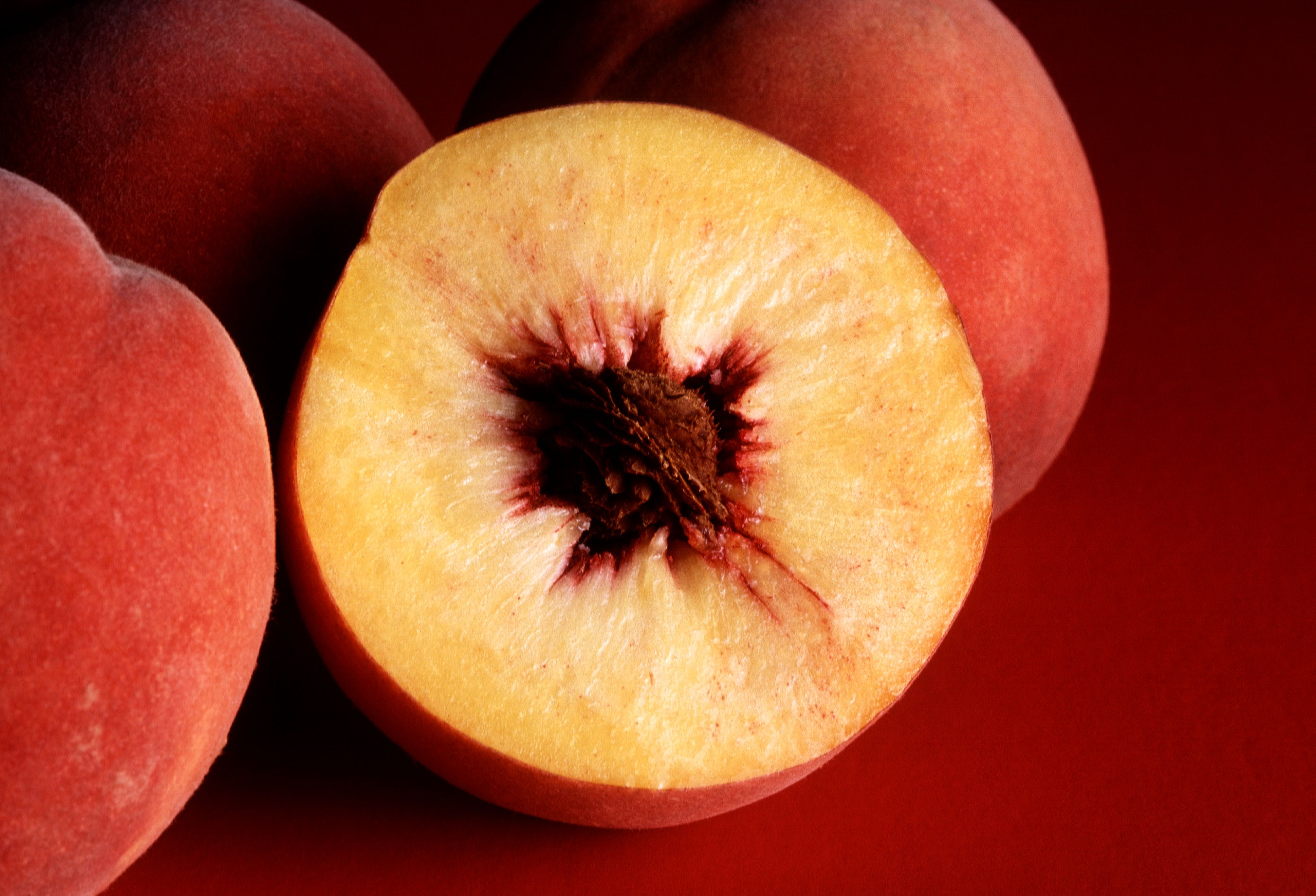
Cross-section of a peach, a monopyrenous drupe, cut to reveal the pyrene inside

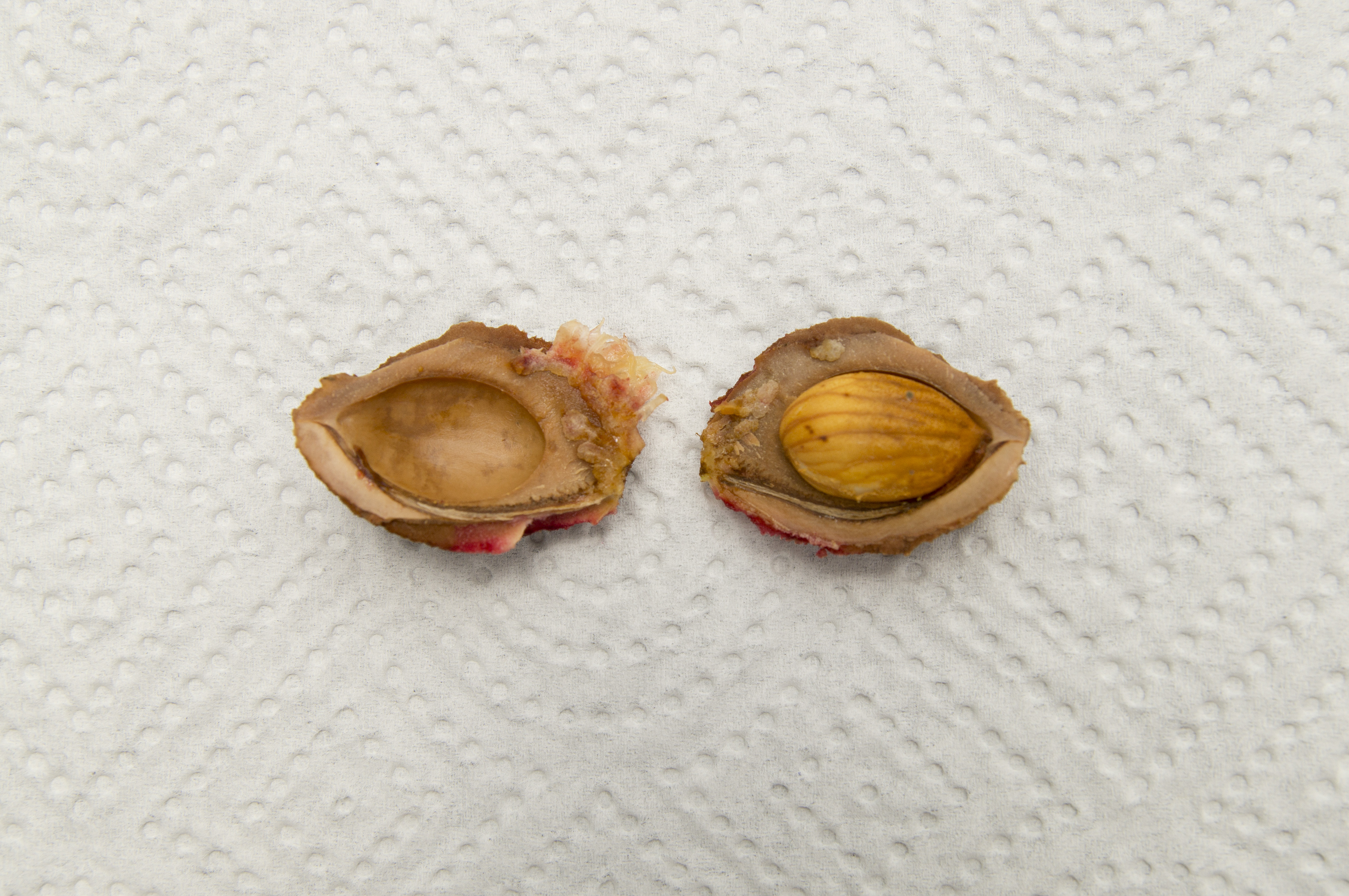
Pyrene of a peach dissected to reveal a single seed inside

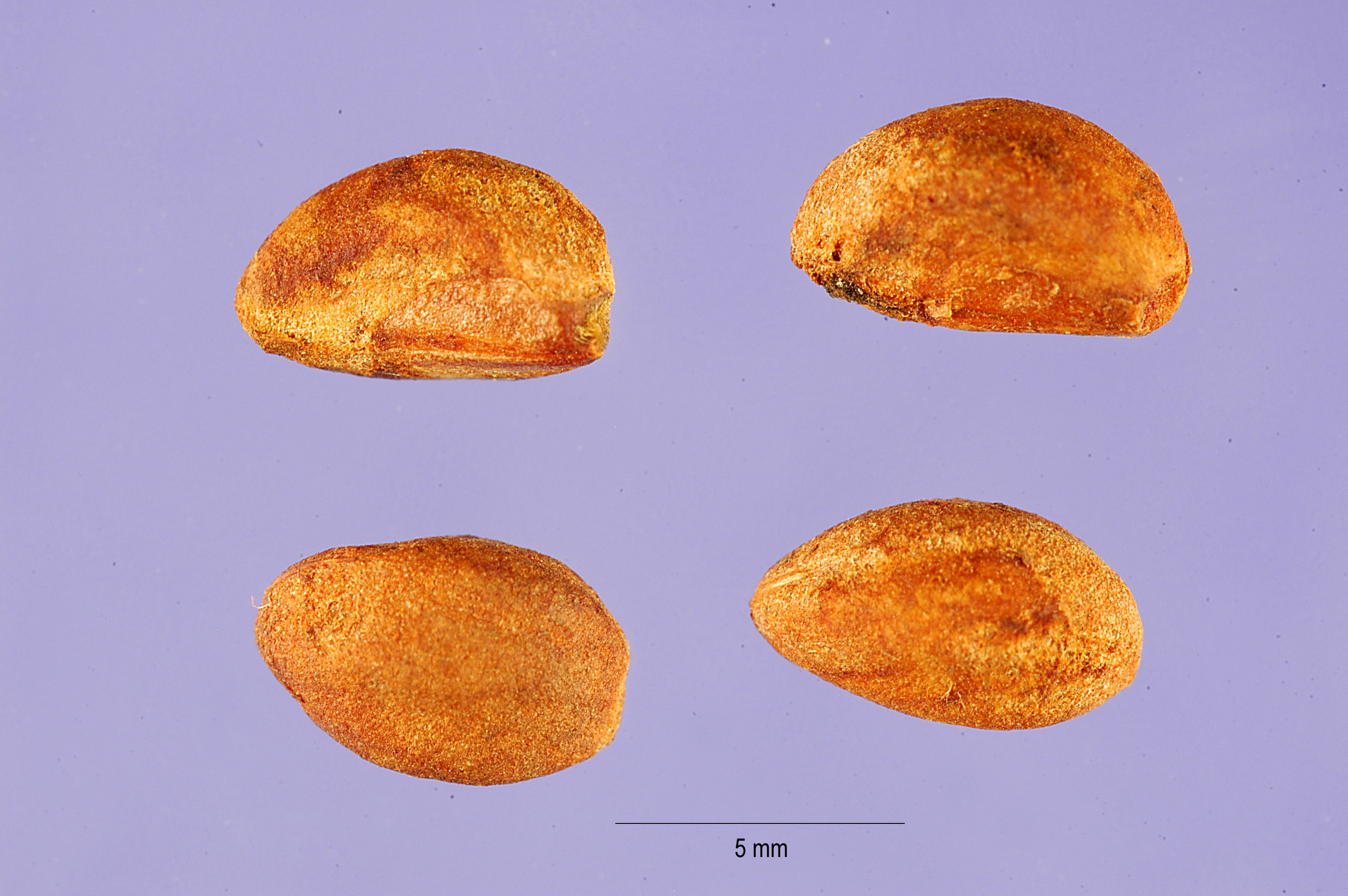
Pyrenes extracted from a single fruit of Crataegus punctata, a polypyrenous drupe

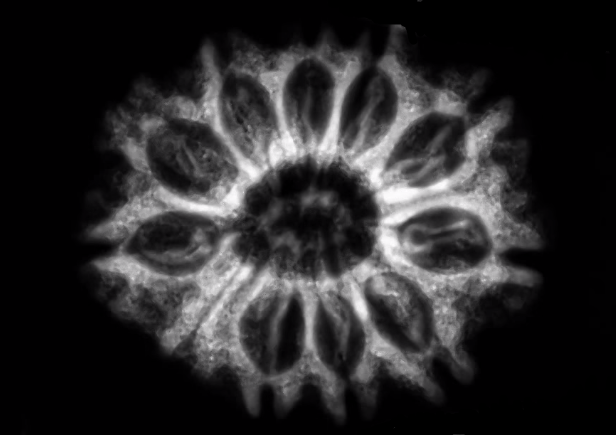
X-ray of a pyrene of Elaeocarpus angustifolius revealing 10 seed-bearing locules inside; the number of locules in E. angustifolius pyrenes is variable between individual fruits

== See also ==
- Nut (fruit)

== Bibliography ==
- Allué, Ethel; Cáceres, Isabel; Expósito, Isabel; Canals, Antoni; Rodríguez, Anna; Rosell, Jordi; Bermúdez de Castro, José María; Carbonell, Eudald (2015). "Celtis remains from the Lower Pleistocene of Gran Dolina, Atapuerca (Burgos, Spain)". Journal of Archaeological Science. 53: 570–577. Bibcode:2015JArSc..53..570A. doi:10.1016/j.jas.2014.11.016.
- Beentje, H.; Williamson, J. (2010). The Kew Plant Glossary: an Illustrated Dictionary of Plant Terms. Royal Botanic Gardens, Kew: Kew Publishing.
- Beer, Robert (1999). The Encyclopedia of Tibetan Symbols and Motifs. Shambhala. ISBN 9781570624162.
- Bush, Ava (1971). "Utilization of the culinary and therapeutic properties of the peach". Economic Botany. 25 (1): 12–21. doi:10.1007/BF02894557. JSTOR 4253205.
- Dardick, Chris; Callahan, Ann M. (2014). "Evolution of the fruit endocarp: molecular mechanisms underlying adaptations in seed protection and dispersal strategies". Frontiers in Plant Science. 5: 284. doi:10.3389/fpls.2014.00284. ISSN 1664-462X. PMC 4070412. PMID 25009543.
- Eckel, P.M. (2011). "A Grammatical Dictionary of Botanical Latin". Missouri Botanical Garden.
- Hickey, M.; King, C. (2001). The Cambridge Illustrated Glossary of Botanical Terms. Cambridge University Press.
- Jones, Constance; Ryan, James D. (2006). Encyclopedia of Hinduism. Infobase Publishing. ISBN 9780816075645.
- Messager, Erwan; Badou, Aïcha; Fröhlich, François; Deniaux, Brigitte; Lordkipanidze, David; Voinchet, Pierre (2010). "Fruit and seed biomineralization and its effect on preservation" (PDF). Archaeological and Anthropological Sciences. 2 (1): 25–34. Bibcode:2010ArAnS...2...25M. doi:10.1007/s12520-010-0024-1. S2CID 128691588.
- Potter, D.; Eriksson, T.; Evans, R.C.; Oh, S.; Smedmark, J.E.E.; Morgan, D.R.; Kerr, M.; Robertson, K.R.; Arsenault, M.; Dickinson, T.A.; Campbell, C.S. (2007). "Phylogeny and classification of Rosaceae". Plant Systematics and Evolution. 266 (1–2): 5–43. Bibcode:2007PSyEv.266....5P. doi:10.1007/s00606-007-0539-9. S2CID 16578516.
- Wang, Ping (1999). 100 Chinese Folk Handicrafts. Guangxi People's Publishing House. ISBN 9787219039250.
