= Stone (manga) =

Japanese manga series

- First tankōbon volume cover, featuring Zizi
- Genre: Adventure; Science fiction
- Manga
- Written by: Sin-ichi Hiromoto
- Published by: Kodansha
- English publisher: NA: Tokyopop
- Imprint: Afternoon KC
- Magazine: Monthly Afternoon
- Original run: September 25, 2001 – June 25, 2002
- Volumes: 2
- icon

Stone (stylized as STONe) is a Japanese manga series written and illustrated by Sin-ichi Hiromoto. It was serialized in Kodansha's seinen manga magazine Monthly Afternoon from September 2001 to June 2002.

== Plot ==
Long ago, a giant sea creature named "Stone" devoured the oceans and continents of Earth, leaving behind a desolate world of Sakai (沙海; 'sand oceans'). What life remains has evolved to survive in the sands, including the dangerous sand whales. Among the lingering remnants of humanity is a whaling tribe on an island, who maintain rich traditions of worshipping the Lord of the Sakai.

A young pink-haired girl named Zizi is an experienced whaler who can see through the Sakai, but longs to leave the island and learn about her own past somewhere on the Forgotten Continent, where her parents came from. She rescues a pirate ship near their island that was attacked by a sand whale, killing it. The tribe discovers the whale was pregnant; because their tradition forbids them from killing unborn life, Zizi is banished from the island. Undeterred, she takes this opportunity to join the pirates, led by Captain Suv, hoping to find the Forgotten Continent.

Voyaging through the Sakai, the pirate ship comes under the crosshairs of the tyrannical Imperial Army, commanded by Imperial Commander Jango. Meanwhile, deep within the Sakai, the mysterious Black Current that has destroyed everything in its path harbors the secret truth about the Forgotten Continent, and Zizi's past.

== Publication ==
Written and illustrated by Sin-ichi Hiromoto, Stone was serialized in Kodansha's seinen manga magazine Monthly Afternoon from September 25, 2001, (Note: Debuted in the magazine's November 2001 issue, released on September 25, 2001.) to June 25, 2002. (Note: Finished in the magazine's August 2002 issue, released on June 25, 2002.) Kodansha collected its chapters in two tankōbon volumes, released on April 23 and August 23, 2002.

Tokyopop licensed the manga for an English-language release in North America, with the two volumes released on September 7, 2004, and December 7, 2004. As of January 2, 2006, the Tokyopop volumes are out of print.

=== Volumes ===
No.	Original release date	Original ISBN	English release date	English ISBN
1	April 23, 2002	978-4-06-314292-1	September 7, 2004	978-1-59532-151-0
1. "ZIZI The witch with pink hair" 2. "The magnificent black whale"; 3. "Crimson tide" 4. "Yellow-SUV-Marine"
2	August 23, 2002	978-4-06-314303-4	December 7, 2004	978-1-59532-152-7
5. "Red Data Animals"; 6. "Purple Haze"; 7. "Rockman Blues"; 8. "Gold Rush"; 9. "White Riot"; 10. "Pink Ribbon Scar"

== Reception ==
In his review of the first Tokyopop volume, Manga Life's Kelvin Green commends the manga for its artwork but criticizes Tokyopop's editor for the needless explaining of a homage of Star Wars. In Manga: The Complete Guide, Jason Thompson praised the manga's "feverish, scratchy artwork" while calling its "movie-style plot" generic, giving it two-and-a-half stars out of four.

== See also ==
- Hells Angels, another manga series by the same author
