= The Stone (music space) =

Music performance space in New York City

Coordinates: 40°43′16.31″N 73°58′51.89″W

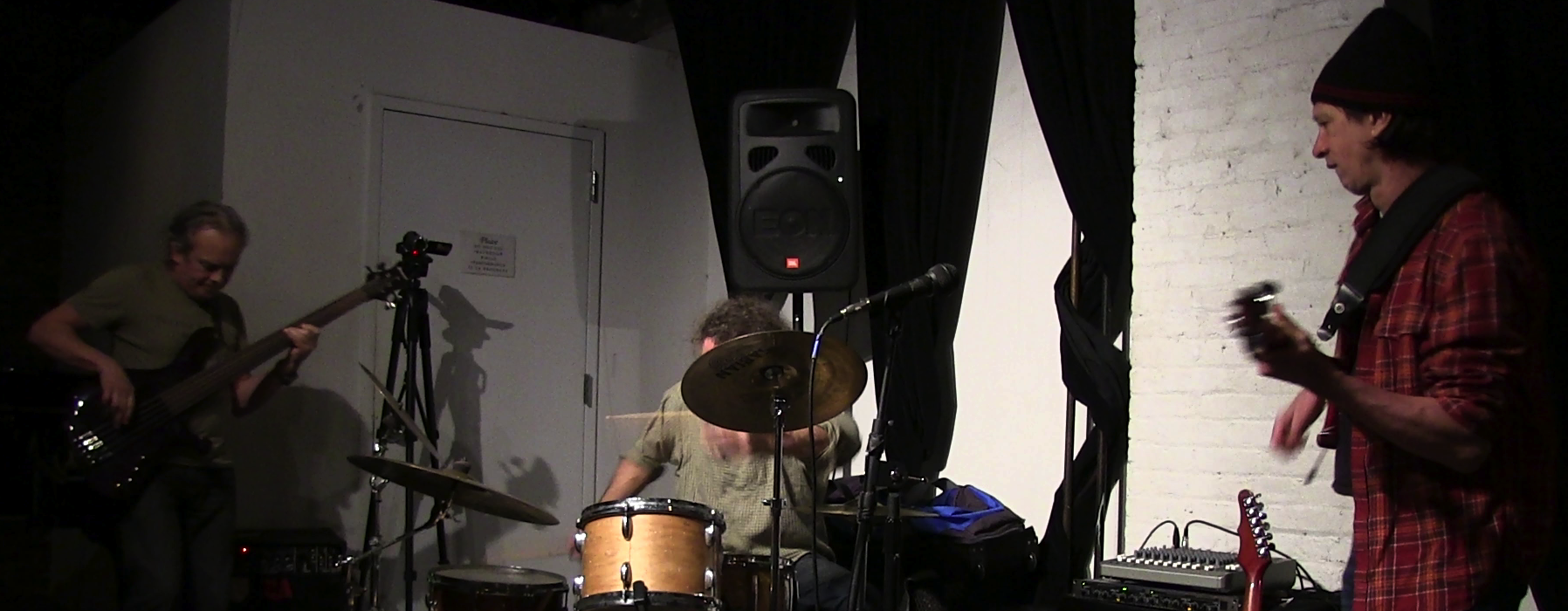
Percy Jones and Stephen Moses at the Stone

The Stone is a not-for-profit experimental music performance space located in the Greenwich Village neighborhood in New York City. It was founded in April 2005 by John Zorn, who serves as the artistic director. It was named for the late Irving Stone, an "inveterate concertgoer" in the New York City music community.

== Location ==
In February 2018, Zorn relocated The Stone to The Glass Box Theatre, at 55 W. 13th St., a venue on the ground floor of Arnhold Hall at The New School university.

Until February 2018, The Stone was situated on the northwest corner of Avenue C and 2nd Street, in a building which used to be the Golden Dragon Chinese restaurant. The only signage visible was the wording The Stone in small gold lettering painted on the door which was visible after the metal security gate was rolled up a few hours before each performance.

== Admission and administration ==
Unlike most musical venues in the area, The Stone does not serve food or drinks. Dancing is also not permitted, as The Stone does not have a cabaret license. All door revenues from the admission cost are given directly to the performers. The club supports itself with donations, benefit concerts, and sales of limited edition CDs. The CD series includes performers such as Mike Patton, Lou Reed, Laurie Anderson, Fred Frith, Chris Cutler, Bill Laswell, Medeski, Martin and Wood and John Zorn himself.

From April 2005 to March 2013 The Stone was booked on a curatorial basis. Every month, a different guest curator was chosen to book performances. As a result, a wide variety of musical styles have been seen in the space, although the vast majority of performers can be considered part of the experimental music or avant-garde scene. Beginning April 2013 The Stone suspended the curator series to present a variety of distinguished cutting-edge artists in week-long Stone Residencies, performing their own work six nights a week, two sets a night.

In December 2016, Zorn announced that The Stone will close its doors in February 2018, adding that it might move to a different location. The space found a new location at The New Glass Box Theatre in Greenwich Village, where it reopened in February 2018.

== Aesthetics ==
The old Stone provided very sparse amenities, as there were no refreshments or commercial products served at the space. There was typically no more than one door volunteer present each night, whose only duties include collecting door fees, keeping the area tidy, and aiding the performers. The space's walls were white, and the floor is painted black, in order to maintain an aesthetic lacking flashiness. The audience sits on black folding chairs that match the floor. The bathroom, was located behind the area where performers are often situated, is not permitted for use during concerts. John Zorn was intent on keeping the space as neutral as possible, in order to provide no distractions during the musical performance. Regulars at the venue argued that the lack of amenities lets the audience focus on the music better, with fewer distractions.

Today, in the Glassbox Theater at Arnhold Hall, The Stone at The New School is at home in newly renovated space, with windows that look out on to the street and into the lobby of Arnhold Hall, where the College of Performing Arts is housed. The floor is black, with new chairs, a larger lobby, new bathrooms, and a Sol LeWitt mural at the entrance of the building and a Kara Walker mural directly across from the Glassbox Theater.

== Past performers ==
- Laurie Anderson
- Cyro Baptista
- John Butcher
- Chelsea Light Moving
- Nels Cline
- Sylvie Courvoisier
- Kayo Dot
- Miguel Frasconi
- Fred Frith
- Annie Gosfield
- Have a Nice Life
- Thomas Heberer
- Charlie Hunter
- Pamelia Kurstin
- Lukas Ligeti
- John Medeski
- Lisa Moore
- Lou Reed
- Mike Patton
- Secret Chiefs 3
- Tyshawn Sorey
- William Susman
- John Zorn
- Loren MazzaCane Connors
