= Shaiva Upanishads =

Upanishads that adhere to the Shiva-centric tradition

The Shaiva Upanishads are minor Upanishads of Hinduism, specific to Shiva theology (Shaivism). There are 14 Shaiva Upanishads in the Muktika anthology of 108 Upanishads. They, along with other minor Upanishads, are generally classified separate from the thirteen ancient Principal Upanishads rooted in the Vedic tradition.

The Shaiva Upanishads also contrast from other groups of minor Upanishads, such as the Samanya Upanishads which are of a generic nature, the Sannyasa Upanishads which focus on the Hindu renunciation and monastic practice, the Yoga Upanishads related to Yoga, the Vaishnava Upanishads which highlight aspects of Vishnu, and the Shakta Upanishads which highlight Shaktism.

The Shaiva Upanishads extol Shiva as the metaphysical Brahman and the Atman (soul, self). A few texts such as Atharvashiras Upanishad include alternate terms such as Rudra, and assert all gods are Rudra, everyone and everything is Rudra, and Rudra is the principle found in all things, their highest goal, the innermost essence of all reality that is visible or invisible. Some Shaiva Upanishads include sections with symbolism about costumes, rites and objects of worship in Shaivism.

== Date ==
The Shaiva Upanishads and other minor Upanishads are a separate subgroup from the thirteen major Principal Upanishads considered to be more ancient dated to be between eighth and first century BCE; however, the estimates for the minor Upanishads vary. According to Mahony, the minor Upanishads are approximately dated to be from about 100 BC to 1100 AD. Patrick Olivelle states that sectarian Upanishads attached to Atharvaveda were likely composed in the second millennium, until about the 16th century.

One of the thirteen Principal Upanishads, namely the Shvetashvatara Upanishad mentions Shiva, Rudra, Hara and other Vedic deities, as well as Samkhya-Yoga and Vedanta philosophy. Shvetashvatara is neither considered a Shaiva nor a minor Upanishad.

The Nilarudra Upanishad is an important Shiva-focussed Upanishad, remarks Deussen, from the group of five minor Upanishads which assert god Shiva as a symbolism for Atman (soul). These are ancient Hindu texts, with Nilarudra likely the oldest (composed closer to Shvetashvatara Upanishad), but Nilaruda is not included in the anthology of 108 Upanishads by Muktika like the other four of the five.

== List of 14 Shaiva Upanishads ==
List of the Shaiva Upanishads according to Muktika anthology
Title	Muktika serial #	Attached Veda	Period of creation
Kaivalya Upanishad	12	Krishna Yajurveda also Atharva Veda	300-100 BCE
Atharvashiras Upanishad	22	Atharvaveda	300-100 BCE
Atharvashikha Upanishad	23	Atharvaveda	5 BCE
Brihajjabala Upanishad	26	Atharvaveda	Post 12th Century AD
Kalagni Rudra Upanishad	28	Krishna Yajurveda	Unknown
Dakshinamurti Upanishad	49	Krishna Yajurveda	Unknown
Sharabha Upanishad	50	Atharvaveda	Unknown
Akshamalika Upanishad	67	Rigveda	Post 12th Century AD
Rudrahridaya Upanishad	85	Krishna Yajurveda	Unknown
Bhasmajabala Upanishad	87	Atharvaveda	Post 12th Century AD
Rudrakshajabala Upanishad	88	Atharvaveda	10th Century AD
Pancabrahma Upanishad	93	Krishna Yajurveda	7th Century AD
Jabali Upanishad	104	Samaveda	200 BCE - 100 CE

== See also ==
- Hindu texts
- Vedas

== Bibliography ==
- Deussen, Paul (1997). Sixty Upanishads of the Veda. Motilal Banarsidass. ISBN 978-81-208-1467-7.
- Deussen, Paul; Bedekar, V.M. (tr.); Palsule (tr.), G.B. (1997). Sixty Upanishads of the Veda. Motilal Banarsidass. ISBN 978-81-208-1467-7.
- Klostermaier, Klaus K. (1984). Mythologies and Philosophies of Salvation in the Theistic Traditions of India. Wilfrid Laurier Univ. Press. ISBN 978-0-88920-158-3.
- Mahony, William K. (1998). The Artful Universe: An Introduction to the Vedic Religious Imagination. State University of New York Press. ISBN 978-0-7914-3579-3.
- Olivelle, Patrick (2008). Upanisads. Oxford University Press. ISBN 978-0-19-954025-9.
