= Kalagni Rudra Upanishad =

Minor Upanishad of Hinduism

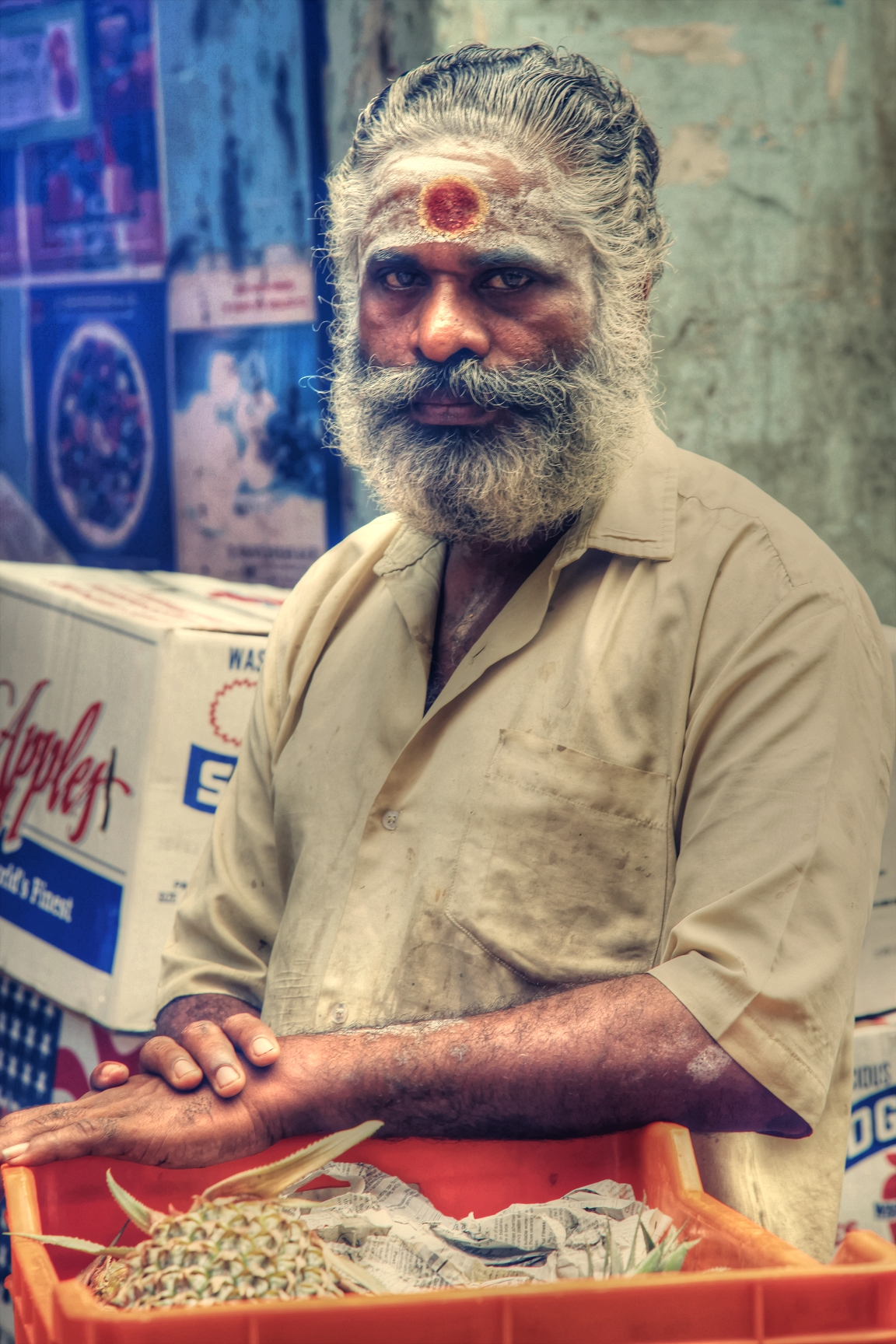
- A text discusses the Tripundra lines on the forehead
- Devanagari: कालाग्निरुद्र
- IAST: Kālāgni Rudrā
- Title means: Shiva (composite of Agni and Rudra)
- Type: Shaiva
- Linked Veda: Krishna Yajurveda
- Chapters: 2

The Kalagni Rudra Upanishad (Sanskrit: कालाग्निरुद्र - उपनिषत्), is one of the minor Upanishads of Hinduism, written in the Sanskrit language. It is attached to the Krishna Yajurveda. It is one of 14 Shaiva Upanishads.

The Upanishad is a discourse by Kalagni Rudra (Shiva) to sage Sanatkumara on the Tripundra, the Shaiva sectarian tilaka consisting of three horizontal lines of sacred ash on the forehead. The allegorical significance of the "three ash lines", states Deussen, is that the tradition sees them as streaks of three Vedic fires, three audible syllables of AUM, three Guṇas, three worlds, three Atmans, three Vedas and three aspects of Shiva. The text extols the Tripundra and tells about the procedure for applying Vibhuti (sacred ash) as Tripundra on various parts of the body with the associated mantras and rites.

Klaus Klostermaier classifies the Kalagni Rudra Upanishad with the Bhasmajabala Upanishad, the Rudrakshajabala Upanishad, the Brihajjabala Upanishad and the Akshamalika Upanishad as Shaiva texts that explain sectarian symbolism in Shaivism.

== Name ==
Kalagni, or Kala-Agni, means "fire that is time". Rudra is the prime mover and destroyer of material world as well as time. Together, states Kramrisch, Kalagni-Rudra connote the principles and time as relentless divine manifestation of that where "at the end all the universe is gathered". Kalagni-Rudra is an epithet of Shiva, related to Bhairava, one who creates everything from fire and then burns everything – gods, men and demons – to ashes.

The text like other Shaiva Upanishads, states Klostermaier, is premised on identifying Shiva as identical to the Hindu concept of Ultimate Reality (Brahman). It is part of the Upanishadic collection, starting with Shvetashvatara Upanishad, which together teach the theory of Vedanta and the practice of Yoga as a means of salvation. Shiva is within as the Atman, assert these texts, the realization of this Shiva is means to infinite peace, and ritual of producing "fire, ashes and leftovers", then smearing oneself with the ashes on the forehead is a constant reminder of the spiritual essence.

The lines of ashes on the forehead is called Tilaka or Pundra, while Tri means three.

== Contents ==
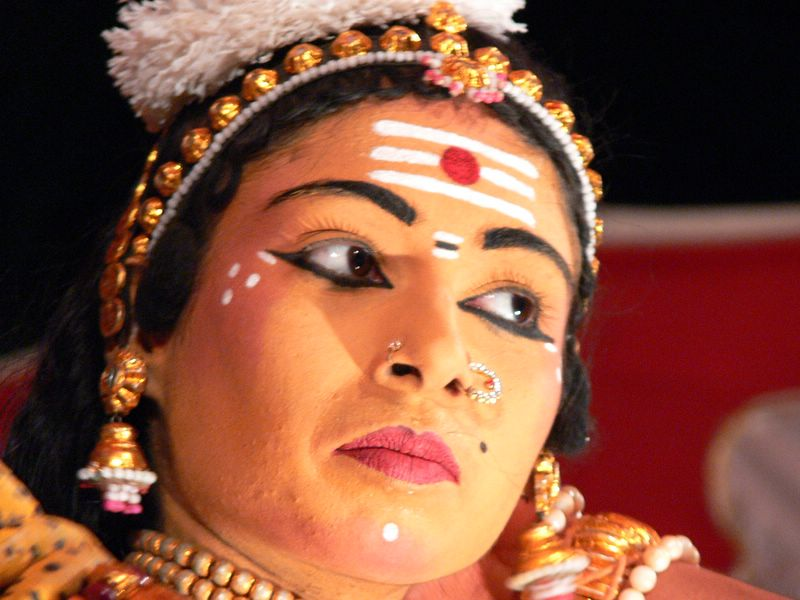
Tripundra lines on a dancer

After a traditional invocation, Sage Sanatkumara requests Kalagni Rudra to explain the application of the Tripundra, a sectarian mark in the form of three lines of vibhuti (sacred ash), and to enlighten him on the specifications of the material used, the procedure to prepare it, the place from where it is to be procured, and its beneficial effects.

Kalagni Rudra explains to Sanatkumara that Tripundra material should be ash from fires. The ash should be collected reciting the Sathyojatam hymn from Taittiriya Aranyaka, of Pancha Brahman and dedicated using Agnir iti bhasma (from Atharvashiras Upanishad, where the five elements – fire, air, ether, water and earth – are all equated to ash. The sacred ash should be mixed with water, reciting the "manas toke hymn" of the Rigveda. Reciting the Mahamrityunjaya Mantra (Tryambakam yajamahe...), the ash is then applied across the head, forehead, chest, and shoulders in three horizontal lines. The hymns Trayayusha, Trayambaka, and Trishakti should be recited. The three markings on the forehead cover a space vertically from the forehead to the eyebrow, and extending from the midpoint of one eyebrow across to the midpoint of the other. This mark is the vow of Shambhu (Shiva), and it leads one to liberation from suffering and rebirth.

The text, in chapter 2, explains the three lines as various triads: sacred fires, syllables of Om, gunas, worlds, types of atman (Soul), powers, Vedas, the time of extraction of the Vedic drink Soma, and Mahesvara (a form of Shiva).

The first line is equated to Garhapatya (the sacred fire in a household kitchen), the A syllable of Om, the Rajas guna, the earth, the external Atman, Kriyā – the power of action, the Rigveda, the morning extraction of Soma, and Maheshvara.

The second streak of ash is a reminder of Dakshinagni (the holy fire lighted in the South for ancestors), the sound U of Om, Sattva guna, the atmosphere, the inner Atman, Iccha – the power of will, the Yajurveda, midday Soma extraction, and Sadashiva.

The third streak is the Ahavaniya (the fire used for Homa), the M syllable in Om, the Tamas guna, Svarga – heaven, the Paramatman – the highest Atman (Brahman), the power of perception, the Samaveda, Soma extraction at dusk, and Shiva.

Kalagni Rudra extols the benefits of wearing the Tripundra by any person in any of the four stages of the human life (see Ashrama (stage)): student, householder, forest dweller, and renouncer. The Tripundra absolves one of all sin. With this ritual smearing, asserts the text, he becomes equal to one who has bathed in all holy places and the one who spends all his time reciting the Rudra hymn. After living a happy and contented life, he becomes one with Shiva after death and does not experience rebirth.

== See also ==
- Atharvashiras Upanishad
- Atharvashikha Upanishad
- Mahanarayana Upanishad
- Tripura Upanishad
