= Brihajjabala Upanishad =

Shaiva Hindu religious text written in Sanskrit

Brihajjabala
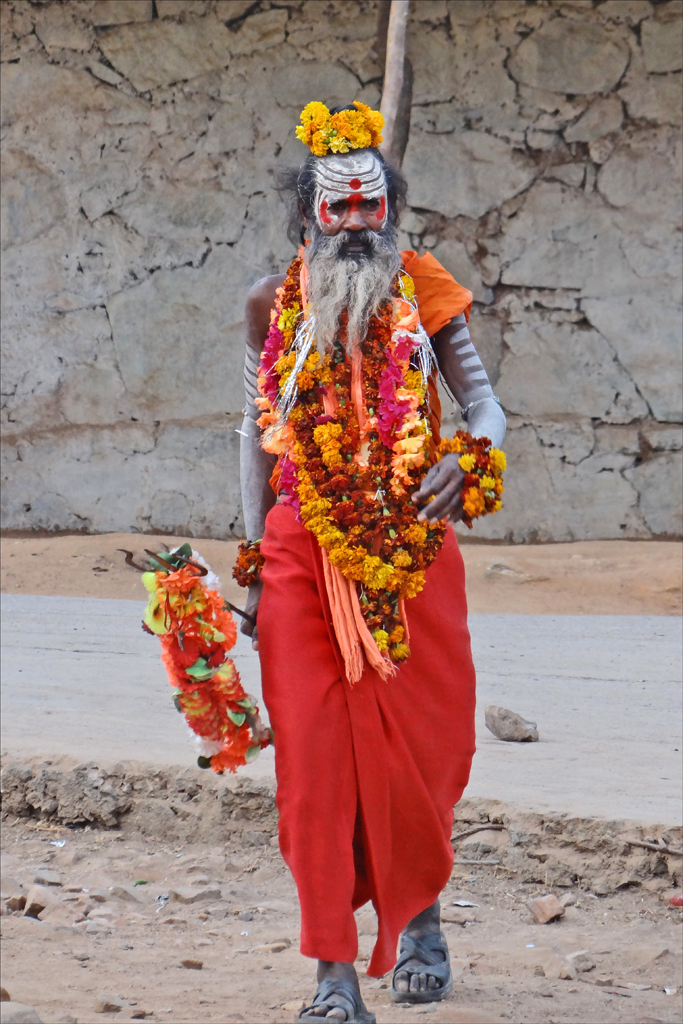
- A Shaiva sadhu marked with Bhasma lines
- Devanagari: बृहजजाबाल
- IAST: Bṛhajjābāla
- Title means: Great Jabala
- Date: late medieval era
- Type: Shaiva
- Linked Veda: Atharvaveda
- Chapters: 8

The Brihajjabala Upanishad (Sanskrit: बृहज्जाबाल उपिनषद, Bṛhajjābāla) is one of the minor Upanishads, written in Sanskrit language. This Hindu text is attached to the Atharvaveda, and is one of 14 Shaiva Upanishads.

It describes the process of producing Vibhuti (Bhasma), or sacred ash, methods of using it for tilaka Tripundra on various parts of the body, and its meaning in Shaivism. The text also mentions Rudraksha as prayer beads.

Klaus Klostermaier classifies the Brihajjabala Upanishad along with the Bhasmajabala Upanishad, the Rudrakshajabala Upanishad, the Kalagni Rudra Upanishad and the Akshamalika Upanishad as Shaiva texts that explain symbolism of rites and objects of worship in Shaivism.

It is also spelled as Brihad jabala Upanishad, Brihajjabalopanishad and Brihat Jabala Upanishad.

== History ==
The date of composition and the author of this text are unknown. It is likely a late medieval, post-12th century era Upanishad and it is neither part of the 17th century compilation of 50 important Hindu Upanishads published by Mughal era Dara Shikoh, nor part of the 18th-century anthology of 52 popular Upanishads in North India published by Colebrooke, nor is it found in the Bibliotheca Indica anthology of popular Upanishads in South India by Narayana.

In a Telugu language anthology of 108 Upanishads of the Muktika in the modern era, narrated by Rama to Hanuman, it is listed at serial number 26.

== Contents ==
The Brihajjabala Upanishad is divided into 8 chapters called Brahmanas. It is presented as a conversation between Sage Bhusunda, a descendant of Sage Jabali (thus called Jabala) - identified with Sage Sanatkumara in the text, and Kalagni Rudra, a destructive form of the god Shiva who is identified with Bhairava.

In the first Brahmana, Sage Bhusunda requests Kalagni Rudra to tell him about vibhuti (sacred ash). The god directs him to the text written by Sage Pippalada on the issue. Bhusunda insists to be told the knowledge of the Brihajjabala (the Great Jabala) scripture. Kalagni Rudra tells about five types of sacred ash: Vibhuti, Bhasita, Bhasma, Kshara, and Raksha. Each ash is associated with a form of Shiva, a mahabhuta (classical element), a Power (Kala), a cow and her dung. The form of Shiva is described to create an element from his face. From the element, rises a power, which in turn creates a different-coloured cow from whose dung, the sacred ash is created. Further, the origins of the name of the sacred ash are given.

| Sacred Ash | Form of Shiva | Element | Power | Cow | Colour of cow | Significance |
|---|---|---|---|---|---|---|
| Vibhuti | Sadyojata | Prithvi (Earth) | Nivritti, retirement from worldly pleasures | Nanda | golden | Cause of prosperity |
| Bhasita | Vamadeva | Ap (water) | Pratishtha | Bhadra | black | Since it shines |
| Bhasma | Aghora | Agni (Fire) | Vidya, knowledge | Surabhi | red | Destroys sins |
| Kshara | Tatpurusha | Vayu (Air) | Shanti, peace | Sushila | white | Drives away dangers |
| Raksha | Ishana | Akasha (Ether) | Santyatita, | Sumana | multi-coloured | Protects from fears |

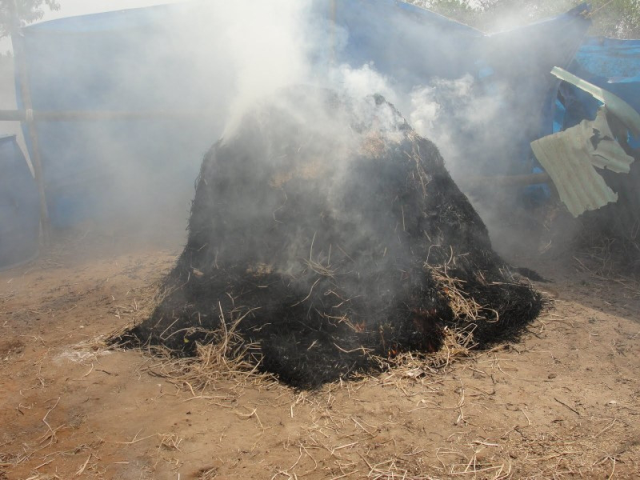
Cow dung being burnt to create Bhasma.

In the second Brahmana, the sage asks about Bhasma snana (bathing in sacred ash), which is the form of Agni (Fire) and Soma (Elixir of the gods, Moon). The interdependence of the opposites Agni and Soma is told. Agni is symbolized by Kalagni Rudra or Shiva, while Soma complements it as Shakti, Shiva's consort. Bhasma is equated to Agni, while water is Soma. Together, they constitute Bhasma snana. Mantras related to smearing of the Bhasma on the body are given. One who observes this ritual is said to attain mukti (liberation). One who burns himself by Shiva's Agni and cools himself by drops of Soma by the method of yoga is said to become immortal.

In the third Brahmana, Bhusunda inquires about the method of making sacred ash. The characteristics of the cow whose dung can be used are listed. Dung of brown cow is considered most appropriate. The urine of a cow is suggested to be mixed in the dung. The rituals of extracting of the dung like worship of cow, collecting the urine and dung from its source before touching the ground and associated mantras are told. The mantras for mixing dung with urine, drying balls of the mixture and burning the dried balls are told. The balls are burnt for three days in a Homa (fire-sacrifice), which is fuelled with corn chaff. On fourth day, the ash is extracted and mixed with perfume water or cow urine and various powders like sandalwood, kumkum and so forth. Finally, cakes of this mixture are dried and used as Bhasma. Four types of Bhasma which grant salvation are listed. Anukalpa is the result of Agnihotra and Virujanala fire sacrifices. Upakalpa is created by burning dried cow dung from the forest according to the directives of the Grihya Sutra texts. Upopakalpa is made by burning cow dung with cow urine according to the directives of the Kalpa scriptures. Akalpa is obtained from Shiva temples.

In the fourth Brahmana, the seer asks about the method of Bhasma snana ("ash-bath"), smearing one with Bhasma. Kalagni Rudra tells about two types: Malasnana (bathing for dirt removal) and Vidhisnana (bathing by rituals). Malasnana is application of Bhasma on the entire body; mantras for application on the body are told. Vidhisnana is application of the Bhasma on specific parts of the body like head, face, chest, feet and "secret parts" (groin). The mantras for the same are listed. Further, times when the Bhasma snana should be done are told, e.g. twilight, after eating, after touching a woman, cat, eagle etc. While worshipping gods, the guru, sages or approaching the sacred fire or in places of impurity, the Tripundra, the Shaiva tilaka in form of three horizontal lines of ash, are recommended to be applied. Bhusunda probes about the rules of Tripundra further. The Tripundra is prescribed by Kalagni Rudra to be applied on 32, 16, 8 or 5 spots on the body, which are listed along with the presiding deities of those locations. Instead of the complete Bhasma snana, Tripundra can be applied to the elbows, forearms, back, head, and forehead; the mantras, presiding deities of application on each part as well as the sin which is destroyed by the application on the specific part, is told. For example, applying the mantra on the chest/heart is done by invoking the fire-god Agni and is said to destroy sins committed by the mind.

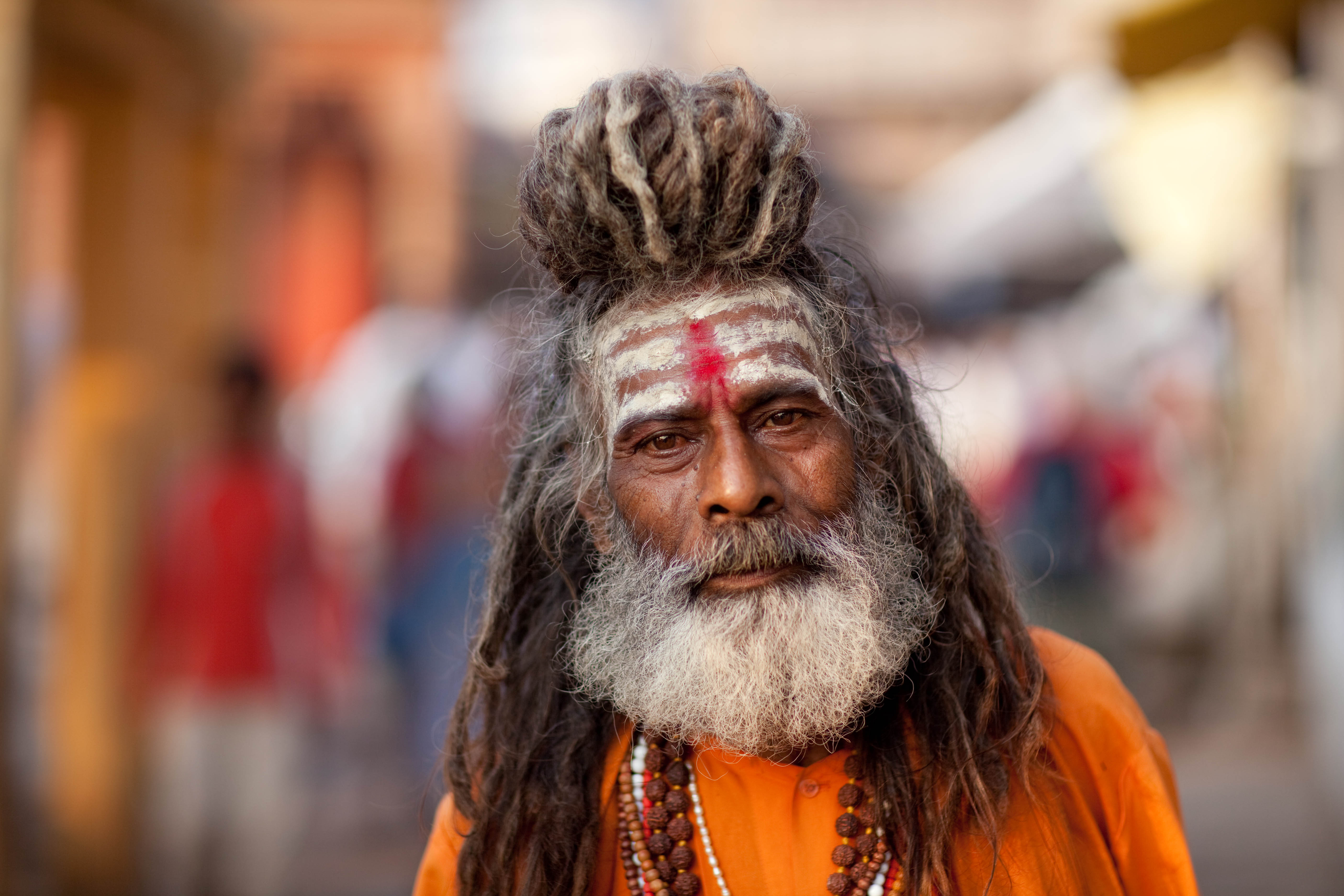
A Shaiva sadhu with the Tripundra on the forehead and wearing Rudraksha necklaces.

The fifth Brahmana continues with Kalagni Rudra's reply on the Tripundra. The caste rules about the Bhasma are described, followed by rules of the Bhasma to the four stages of life (Ashrama (stage)). Each is prescribed to acquire Bhasma from a different sacred flame. The Bhasma from Shiva temples can be used by all. The glories of the Bhasma are then sung. Bhasma is said to destroy various sins. The ill-effects of not wearing the Tripundra on the forehead are informed. Insult of the Tripundra is said to be insult of Shiva. The Brihajjabala Upanishad repetitively emphasizes the importance of wearing the Tripundra and Bhasma-snana, enumerating its merits.

In the sixth Brahmana, the sage questions about the five types of Bhasma, Vibhuti et al. mentioned in the first Brahmana. Kalagni Rudra narrates a tale. A Brahmin Karuna in the family of Sage Vashistha was cursed to be a fly and was killed by his brother. Karuna's wife Suchismita went to Arundhati, the wife of Vashistha, with his husband's fly corpse. Arundhati resurrected Karuna with Bhasma. After 100 years, he killed by another relative, but was again revived with the Bhasma. In another tale, the gods are rescued from the sin of lusting after Ahalya (wife of Sage Gautama), by Sage Durvasa by the Bhasma. Another incident is told when the god Vishnu smeared himself with Bhasma on advice of Shiva, who tells Vishnu about the greatness of Bhasma.

The seventh Brahmana starts with the conversation between King Janaka and Sage Yajnavalkya, where Janaka questions the sage about Tripundra and Bhasma. Janaka and Sage Pippalada then approach the god Brahma to learn more about the Tripundra. Pippalada then asks the same to Vishnu and Kalagni Rudra. The merits of wearing Bhasma are retold. Sanatkumara then asks Kalagni Rudra about the sacred Rudraksha, followed by a short reply on greatness of the Rudraksha.

The eighth Brahmana in tradition of the Upanishads is about the merits of the Upanishad, about which Bhusunda asks. One who studies the Brihajjabala daily is purified by and gains powers of various deities, is absolved of various sins, becomes a conqueror of worlds, and gets the merit of studying various scriptures. Reading this Upanishad is told to be superior to the Atharvashikha Upanishad and the Nrisimha Tapaniya Upanishad. He is said to attain the Supreme Abode of the All-pervading God.

== Commentary ==
The Brihajjabala Upanishad describes many rituals of the Pashupata sect of Shaivism. Bhasma, sacred ash, is equated to atman (Soul) and antratman (Inner Soul). The rituals of Bhasma-snana (ash-bath) and application of Tripundra, instead of the ash-bath are significant Shaiva practices.

The Bhasma Jabala Upanishad like the Brihajjabala Upanishad lauds the Bhasma. However, there are some differences in the rituals described in both the Upanishads. The former recommends the ash be applied to neck, cheeks, eyes, mouth, elbows, wrists, shoulders, heart (chest), navel and palms, while this Upanishad prescribes the ash to mainly five parts: forehead, feet, thighs and genitals.
