= Tarasara Upanishad =

Vaishnava Hindu text

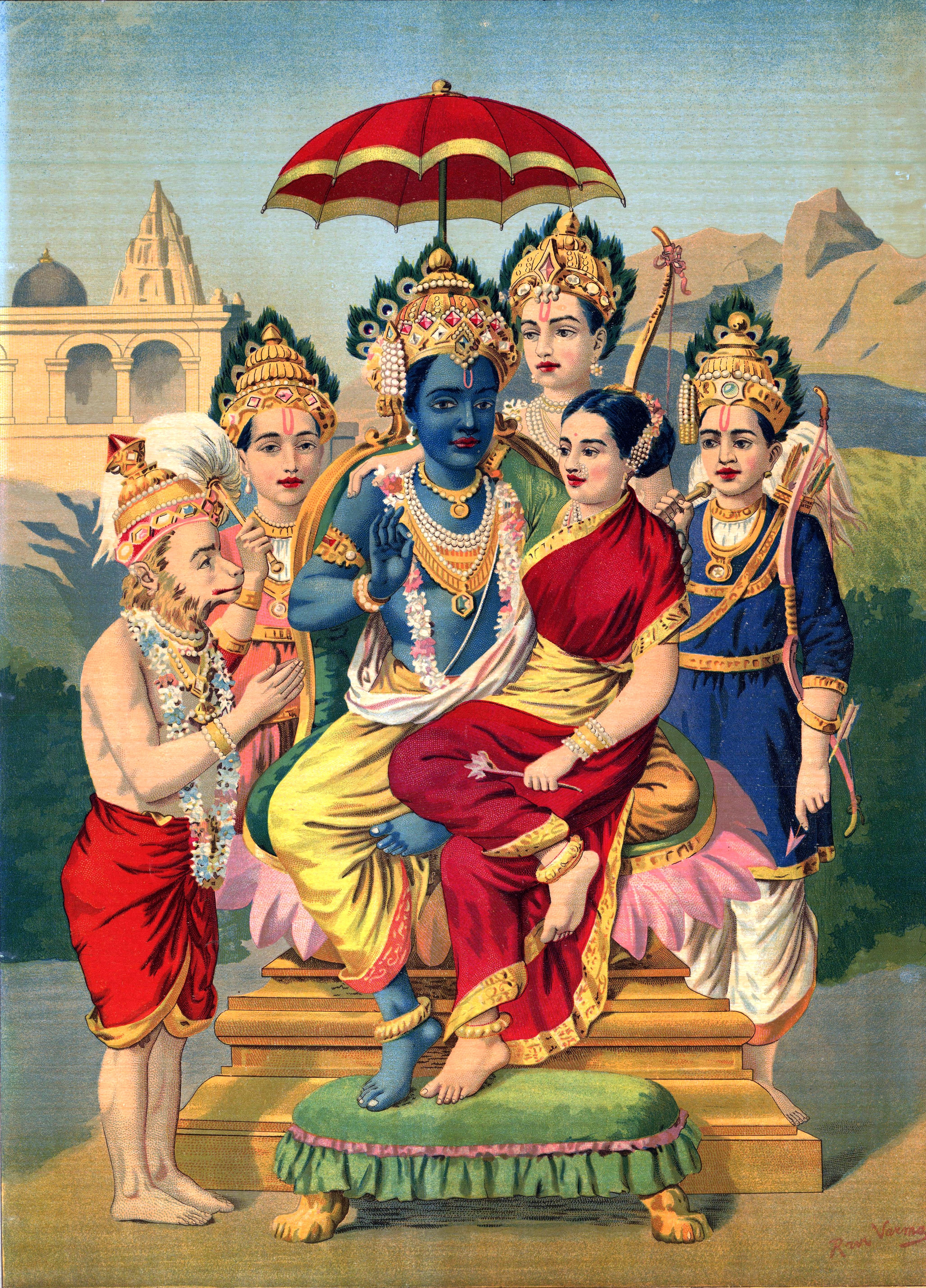
- The text discusses major characters in the epic Ramayana with Rama as Narayana (Vishnu)
- Devanagari: तारसार
- IAST: Tārasāra
- Title means: Essence of mystical syllables
- Date: Medieval
- Type: Mantra
- Linked Veda: Shukla Yajurveda
- Chapters: 3
- Philosophy: Vaishnavism

The Tarasara Upanishad (Sanskrit: तारसार उपनिषत्, IAST: Tārasāra Upaniṣad) is a minor Upanishad of Hinduism. This Sanskrit text is classified as one of 14 Vaishnava Upanishads, and a Mantra Upanishad. It is one of the 19 Upanishads attached to the Shukla Yajurveda.

The text is notable for its discussion of Om for yogic meditation as Taraka or that which helps one cross from mundane into spiritual world. It is one of the texts which mentions the "Om Namo Narayana" mantra of Vaishnavism. The Upanishad discusses the Om mantra, and integrates into its sound, the central characters of the epic Ramayana such as Rama, Sita, Lakshmana, Hanuman, Bharata, Shatrughna and Jambavan. It also asserts that Hanuman is a manifestation of Shiva.

== History ==
The date or author of Tarasara Upanishad is unknown. The first chapter of this Upanishad is identical with the influential and ancient Jabala Upanishad. Thereafter the text of both Upanishads are different.

The Tarasara Upanishad, according to Deussen, incorporates partly an elaborated text from sections 5 and 6 of the Ramottaratapaniya Upanishad. The text assumes the existence of Ramottaratapaniya Upanishad, suggesting a relative chronology. Instead of a mantra focussed entirely on King Rama as in Ramottaratapaniya, the Tarasara text incorporates the mantra "Om Namo Narayanaya", as a 'tarakam' meaning "deliverer."

Manuscripts of this text are also found titled as Tarasaropanisad. In the Telugu language anthology of 108 Upanishads of the Muktika canon, narrated by Rama to Hanuman, it is listed at number 91. It appears in the collection of Upanishads under the title "Oupanekhat", put together by Sultan Mohammed Dara Shikhoh in 1656, consisting of a Persian translation of 50 Upanishads and who prefaced it as the best book on religion, the Tarasara or Taraka Upanishad is listed at number 46 as “Tark”. Dara Shikoh's collection was in the same order as found in Upanishad anthologies popular in north India. But it does not find mention in the 52 Upanishads version of Colebrooke or in compilation of Upanishads by Narayana – an Indian scholar who lived sometime after the 14th-century CE, and republished in the modern era as the Bibliothica Indica edition.

== Contents ==
The text has three chapters, with the first a repeat of the first chapter of the Jabala Upanishad. The second and third chapter focus on describing the Om mantra, it being the ultimate and highest reality Brahman, and its relationship to Narayana (Vishnu).

That which is Om is the indestructible,
the supreme, and the Brahman.
That alone should be worshipped.
It is this that is of the eight subtle syllables.

—Tarasara Upanishad

Just like the Jabala Upanishad, the chapter 1 of the Upanishad, is structured as a conversation between Brihaspati and Yajnavalkya. The latter states that true Kurukshetra is Avimuktam – a place that Shiva never left and a part of Varanasi (Banaras). This place, recommends the text, is for all those renouncers who after having wandered places, can stay in. This is the place, asserts the Upanishad, where Rudra imparts the moksha knowledge just when the last vital breaths of the dying are departing, leading one to videhamukti. This place is a spiritual seat of all living beings (holy), asserts the text, a place to revere and not leave.

The Upanishad thereafter glorifies Narayana, by stating that "Om Namo Narayana" is the means to cross from mundane world into spiritual world (Taraka). Om in this mantra is Atman (self, soul) asserts the text, Namah represents Prakriti (nature, changing reality), and Narayana is the nature of Parabrahman (supreme Brahman).

The text further describes how the sound fragments of the mantra "Om Namo Narayanaya" includes Brahma, Vishnu, Rudra, Ishvara, all of the universe, Purusha, Bhagavan and Param-atman (supreme self). Om is also the indestructible, unchanging reality (Brahman), states the text, which alone ought to be worshipped. The "Om" mantra has eight subtle sound elements, describes the Upanishad, "A", "U", "M", bindu, nada, kala (era, present time), kalatita (beyond present era, or future), and the last subtle sound element is what is beyond kalatita.

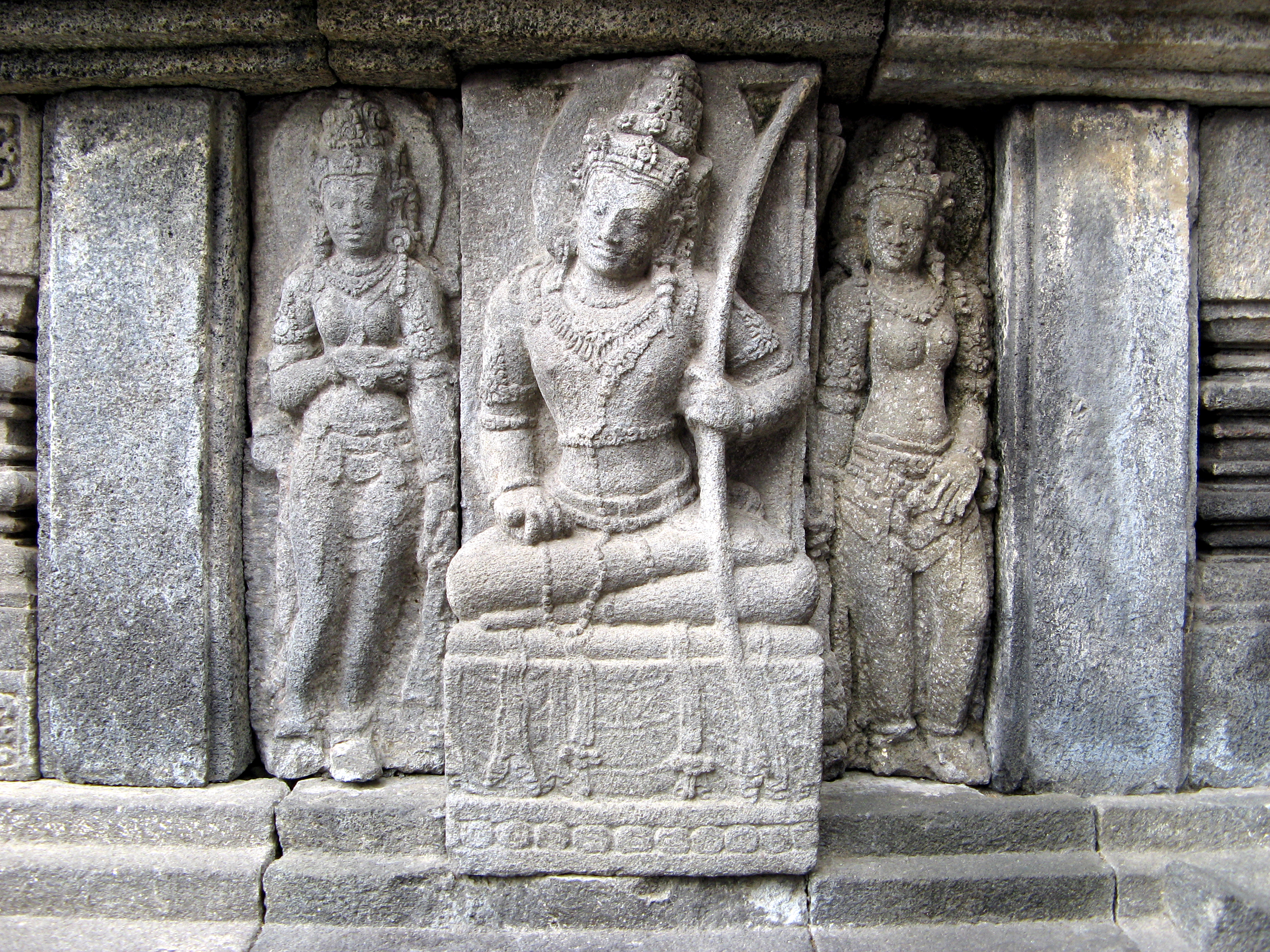
Rama with bow, flanked by Lakshmi and Sri in Prambanan Hindu temple, Indonesia. They are mentioned in this text.

In chapter 2, the Upanishad describes the same Om mantra in terms of the characters of the Hindu epic Ramayana. The "A" is the source of Brahma who became Jambavat, from "U" came Vishnu who became Surgriva, from "M" of AUM mantra came Shiva who manifested as Hanuman, states the text. The bindu of Om became Shatrughna (third brother of Rama), the nada became Bharata (elder brother of Rama), kala resonance became Lakshmana (younger brother of Rama), the kalatita became Lakshmi who manifested as goddess Sita (a Shakti, wife of Rama), and beyond all this is the last subtle part of Om which is Supreme Self manifesting as Rama.

The text next presents eight mantras, asserting them to be a means to realize the Atman. These repeat the mapping of elements of Om mantra to the characters of the Ramayana, calling Rama as Paramatman, Narayana and supreme Purusha (cosmic man), the ancient Purushottama, the eternal, the liberated, the true, the highest bliss, the one without a second. The mantra reciter should meditate, states the text, "Brahman is myself, I am Rama". A mastery of this Ashtakshara mantra, the Upanishad states, is equivalent to uttering the Gayatri mantra a hundred thousand times and to learning Itihasas, Puranas, and Rudra Mantras. This is the path of inner purification, this is the way to see the supreme seat of Vishnu, states Tarasara Upanishad.

== See also ==
- Atharvashiras Upanishad
- Maha Upanishad
- Mahanarayana Upanishad
- Tripura Upanishad
