= Rudrakshajabala Upanishad =

Upanishadic Hindu scripture

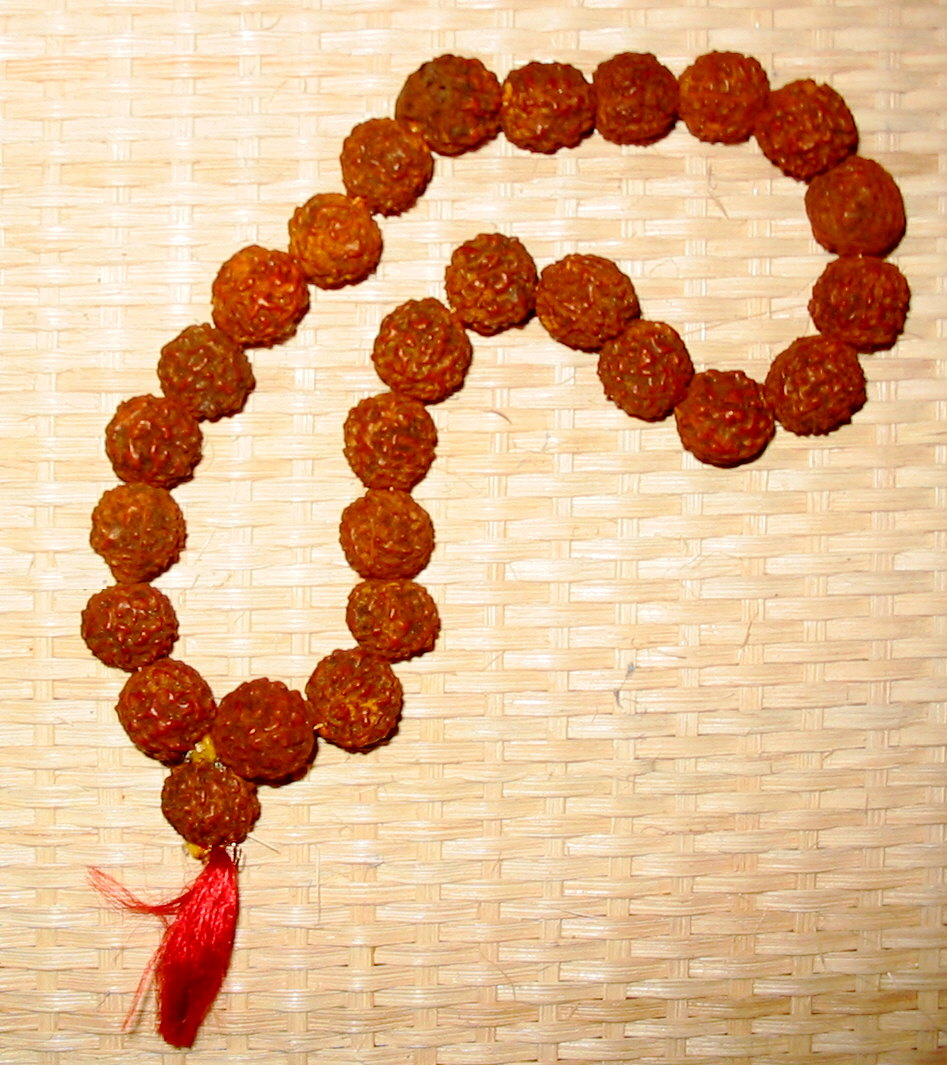
- Rudraksha beads
- Author(s): Kalagni Rudra and Sage Sanatkumara
- Type: Shaiva
- Linked Veda: Samaveda

Rudrakṣajābāla Upaniṣad (Sanskrit: रुद्राक्षजाबाल उपनिषत्), also known as Rudraksha Jabala Upanishad, Rudraksha Jabalopanishad, Rudraksha Upanishad (रुद्राक्ष उपनिषत्) and Rudrakshopanishad, is one of 108 Upanishadic Hindu scriptures, written in the Sanskrit language. It is dedicated to the rudraksha, a seed used as prayer beads, regarded sacred to the god Shiva. The scripture belongs to the Shaiva sect, which worships Shiva, and is associated with the Samaveda, and is one of 14 Shaiva Upanishads. It is told as a conversation between Kalagni Rudra, a form of Shiva, and Sage Sanatkumara.

== Contents ==
The Rudraksha Jabala Upanishad begins with an invocation to Brahman, the Supreme Reality for the well-being of all parts of the body, the prana (spirit), and speech. The hymn ends with a wish for peace.

=== Rudra's tears ===
Sage Bhusunda, also known as Sanatkumara, asks Kalagni Rudra, a destructive form of Shiva who is identified with Bhairava, about the origins of the Rudraksha and the benefits of wearing it. The god replies that for the destruction of the Tripura (three cities), he closed his eyes for a thousand years in meditation; tears from his eyes fell on earth, creating the Rudraksha. The mere utterance of the word "Rudraksha" is said to bestow the merit of the donation of ten cows, and its sight and touch equals the charity of twenty cows.

=== Characteristics of rudraksha ===
Bhusunda probes further about information regarding the rudraksha, such as the method of wearing it, associated mantras, and so on. Kalagni Rudra says that wearing rudraksha absolves all sins. Its sight equals the merit of a crore, its wearing yields a 100 crore, and wearing and doing japa has a lakh crore benefits.

The physical characteristics of a rudraksha are then described. A rudraksha of the amla fruit size is the best, followed by the size of a berry and the size of the black gram, the lowest. Four types of rudraksha – white, red, yellowish, and black – are declared fit for four Varnas or castes – Brahmin, Kshatriya, Vaishya, and Shudra, respectively. The best rudraksha is described as well-rounded, well-sized, smooth, hard, thorny, and with a natural hole. A rudraksha which is damaged, broken, infested, or damaged by worms or insects, without thorns, or of abnormal size or shape, should not be used.

=== Wearing rudrakshas ===
The rudrakshas should be woven in a silken thread and worn. A rudraksha can be worn on the hair tuft, 30 around the head, 36 in a necklace, 16 on each arm, 12 on each wrist, 15 around the shoulders, and 108 in the yajnopavita (sacred thread). They can be worn as 2, 3, 5, or 7 rounds. One should also wear them around the waist, as earrings, and as a rosary. A devotee of Shiva should eternally wear them. Mantras that should be recited when the rudraksha is worn around a particular part of the body are then recited.

=== Associations with the number of faces ===
4-faced (mukhi) rudraksha

5-faced (mukhi) rudraksha

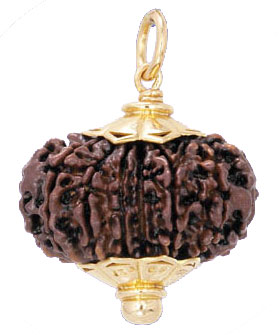
14-faced rudraksha

Bhusunda enquires about the classification of Rudraksha based on its faces (mukhi, naturally occurring partitions in a rudraksha, formed by grooves) and the benefits of each. Kalagni Rudra correlates rudrakshas with one to fourteen faces with various deities. Wearing that particular rudraksha placates the associated deity:

| Faces | Deity/Association | Advantage |
|---|---|---|
| 1 | Shiva as Brahman | Control over the senses, unity with Brahman |
| 2 | Ardhanarishvara, combined form of Shiva and his consort Parvati | - |
| 3 | 3 sacred fires | pleasing the fire-god Agni |
| 4 | the four-headed Brahma | - |
| 5 | Pancha-Brahman (five aspects of Shiva) | Cleansing of the sin of human murder |
| 6 | the six-headed Kartikeya and Ganesha, sons of Shiva | health, prosperity, intellect |
| 7 | 7 Matrika (mother) goddesses | health, prosperity, purity of body and mind |
| 8 | 8 Matrika goddesses | pleasing the eight Vasus and the river-goddess Ganga. |
| 9 | 9 Shaktis (powers) | - |
| 10 | 10 Yamas (restraints) | Cleansing of sins |
| 11 | 11 Rudras | Prosperity |
| 12 | Vishnu and 12 Adityas | - |
| 13 | Kamadeva, the god of love | Satisfaction of desires |
| 14 | Shiva as Rudra, from whose eyes Rudraksha originated | Health, cure of diseases |

=== Associated practices and veneration ===
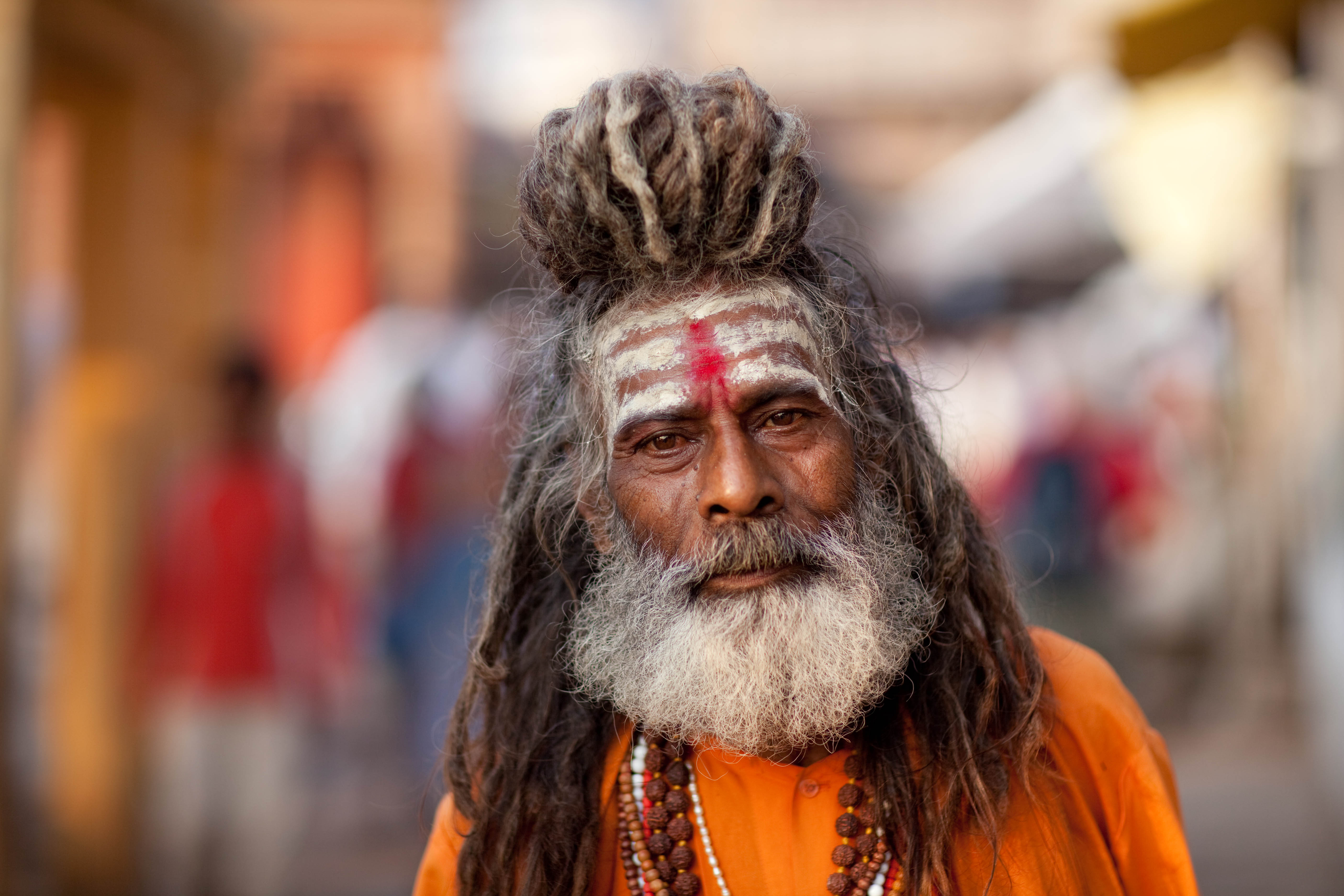
A Shaiva sadhu wearing Tripundra (three lines of ash) on the forehead and Rudraksha necklaces

Further, Kalagni Rudra says that one who wears a rudraksha should not consume alcohol, meat, garlic, onions. etc. The rudraksha should be worn on eclipses, solstices (Uttarayana and Dakshinayana), Poornima (full moon day), Amavasya (new moon day), and so forth. Further, the god says that the rudraksha symbolizes the Hindu Trinity (Trimurti); the base of the rudraksha is Brahma, its middle is Vishnu, and its top is Shiva; all gods reside in its hole.

Sanatkumara joined by various sages approaches Kalagni Rudra. The sages include Nidagha, Jadabharata, Dattatreya, Katyayana, Bharadvaja, Kapila, Vasishtha, and Pippalada. The group asks Kalagni Rudra about other rules of wearing the rudraksha. The god says since they are born from Rudra's eyes, they are called rudraksha ("rudra+eyes") making each rudraksha beads holding a special place in Hindu religious and spiritual practices containing Shiva’s divine power. Wearing it is equated to wearing Bhasma (sacred ash). The mere utterance of its name is equated to the charity of ten cows. Touching and wearing is equal to the donation of 2,000 cows; wearing in the ear is equivalent to the donation of 11,000 cows and the devotee attains the state of the 11 Rudras. Wearing the rudraksha is charity of a crore cows. However, wearing it in the ears is regarded as the best.

=== Conclusion ===
In the tradition of the Upanishad, the text concludes by narrating the benefits of the text. One attains greatness and becomes a guru (teacher) and an expert in mantras by studying the scripture daily. One should use the mantras in the text in worship and Havana (fire-sacrifices). The Brahmin who chants this Upanishad in the evening is absolved of sins he committed during the day. Recitation at noon frees him of the sins of six births (reincarnation). One who recites it in the daytime and in the evening is absolved of the sin of many births and earns the merit of recitation of 6,000 lakh gayatri mantras. One is freed of the sins of killing a Brahmin, stealing gold, drinking alcohol, and having coitus with the wife of his guru. He gains the merits of visiting all pilgrimages and bathing in all sacred rivers. Ultimately, he unites with Shiva after death and does not experience rebirth.

== Critique ==
The Encyclopaedia of Hinduism states that late Upanishads are not considered "true Upanishads" by some scholars, who bestow that status only upon the Mukhya Upanishads. The Rudraksha Jabala Upanishad is given as an example of a sectarian and Tantric Upanishad. These texts are said to have "abused the high name" of Upanishads to propagate their sectarian beliefs. The Symbols Of Art, Religion And Philosophy echoes this sentiment, calling the text as "hardly entitled to be called" an Upanishad.

Klaus Klostermaier classifies the Rudrakshajabala Upanishad along with the Bhasmajabala Upanishad, the Kalagni Rudra Upanishad, the Brihajjabala Upanishad and the Akshamalika Upanishad, which glorify Shaiva sectarian practices.
