= Bhasma =

Bhasma may refer to:

- Vibhuti, sacred ash made of dried wood used in Hindu, Vedic and Āgamic rituals
- Bhasma, a more general term for any ash product in Ayurveda
