= Tripundra =

Sacred ash worn on the forehead by worshippers of Shiva

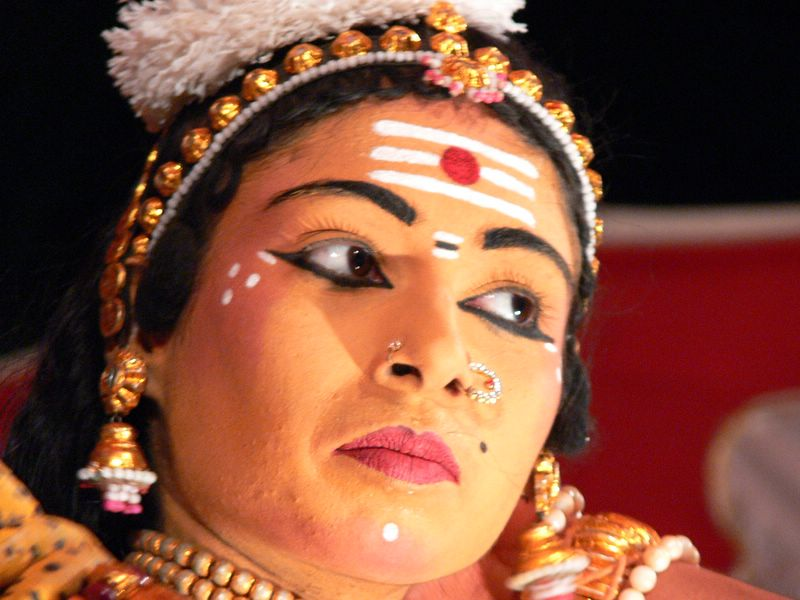
A Yakshagana dancer with tripundra on her forehead

Tripundra (Sanskrit: त्रिपुण्ड्र tripuṇḍra "three marks") is a Hindu Shaivite tilaka, worn by Shaivas as an indication of their affiliation with Shiva. It is also one of the tilakas worn by Smarta Hindus. It consists of three horizontal lines (and sometimes a dot) on the forehead, usually made with sacred ash, and has spiritual meanings in the Shaivite traditions of Hinduism. The Vaishnava counterpart of this tilaka, consisting of vertical lines, is called the Urdhva Pundra.

== History ==
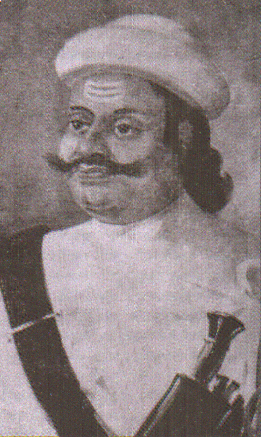
Kaji Kalu Pande, Chief Minister and Army head of Gorkha Kingdom, with a Tripundra Tilaka

The practice is discussed in Hindu texts such as Bhasmajabala Upanishad, Brihajjabala Upanishad and Kalagni Rudra Upanishad. The allegorical significance of the "three ash lines", states Deussen, is that the tradition sees them as streaks of three Vedic fires, three audible syllables of AUM, three Guṇas, three worlds, three Atmans, trayi Vedas, and three aspects of Shiva.

== Usage and significance ==
The Tripuṇḍra, three horizontal lines, on the forehead as well as other body parts are symbols during rites of passages, and for some a daily practice. These lines, states Antonio Rigopoulos, represent Shiva's threefold power of will (icchāśakti), knowledge (jñānaśakti), and action (kriyāśakti). The Tripuṇḍra described in this and other Shaiva texts also symbolizes Shiva's trident (triśūla) and the divine triad of Brahmā, Vishnu, and Shiva.

Tripundra, to those who apply it, is a reminder of the spiritual aims of life, the truth that body and material things shall someday become ash, and that mukti is a worthy goal. Tri means three, pundra means one which is released. There are three horizontal lines of vibhuti (holy ash) on the brow, often with a dot (bindu) as the third eye. Holy ash, remains from yagya or sacrificial fire-wood is a reminder of the temporary nature of the physical body and the importance of spiritual attainment and closeness to Shiva (Atman-Brahman). Chapter 2 of Kalagni Rudra Upanishad explains the three lines as various triads: sacred fires, syllables of Om, gunas, worlds, types of atman (Soul), powers, Vedas, the time of extraction of the Vedic drink Soma, and Mahesvara (a form of Shiva).

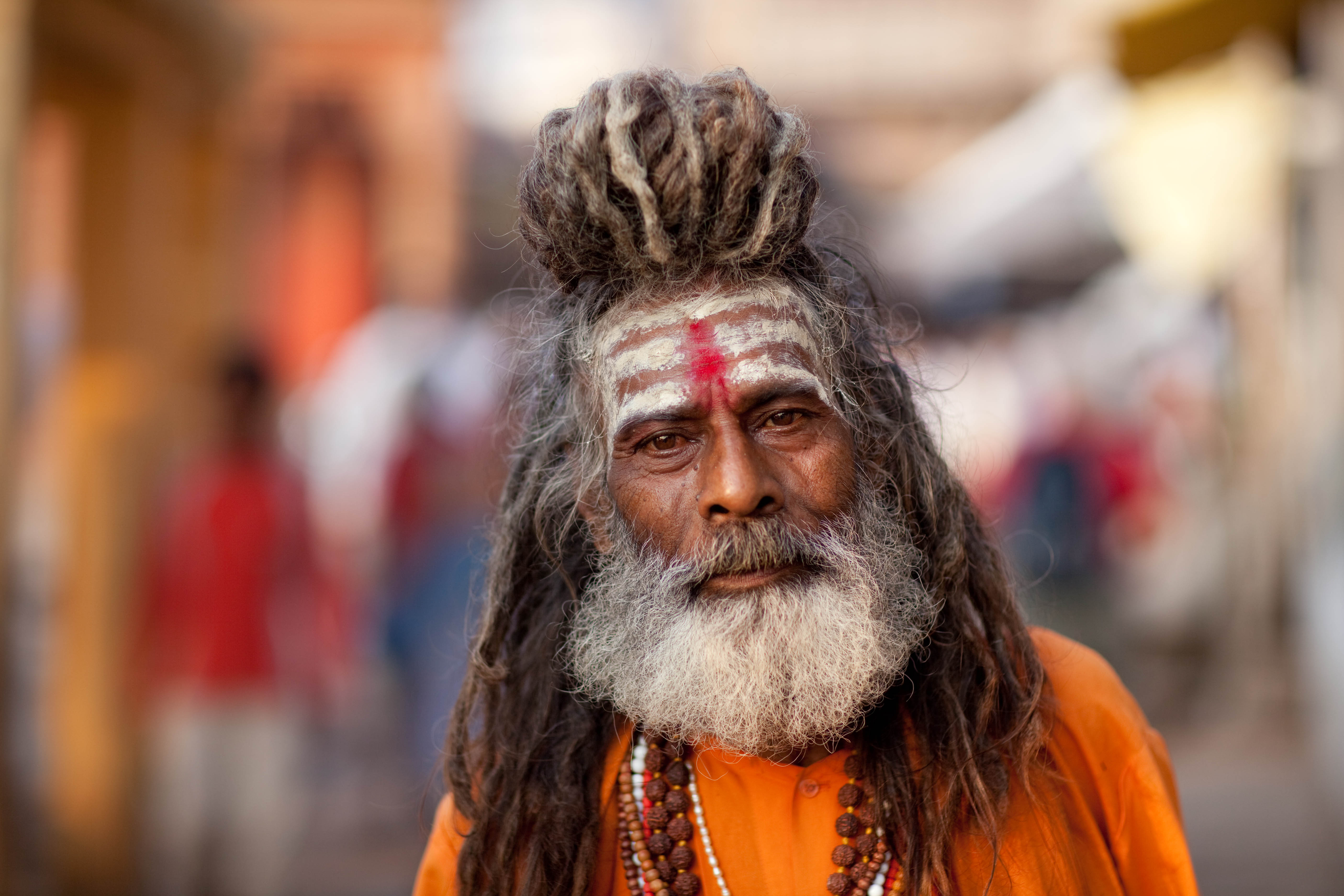
A Shaiva Hindu with Tilaka (Tripundra) on his forehead.

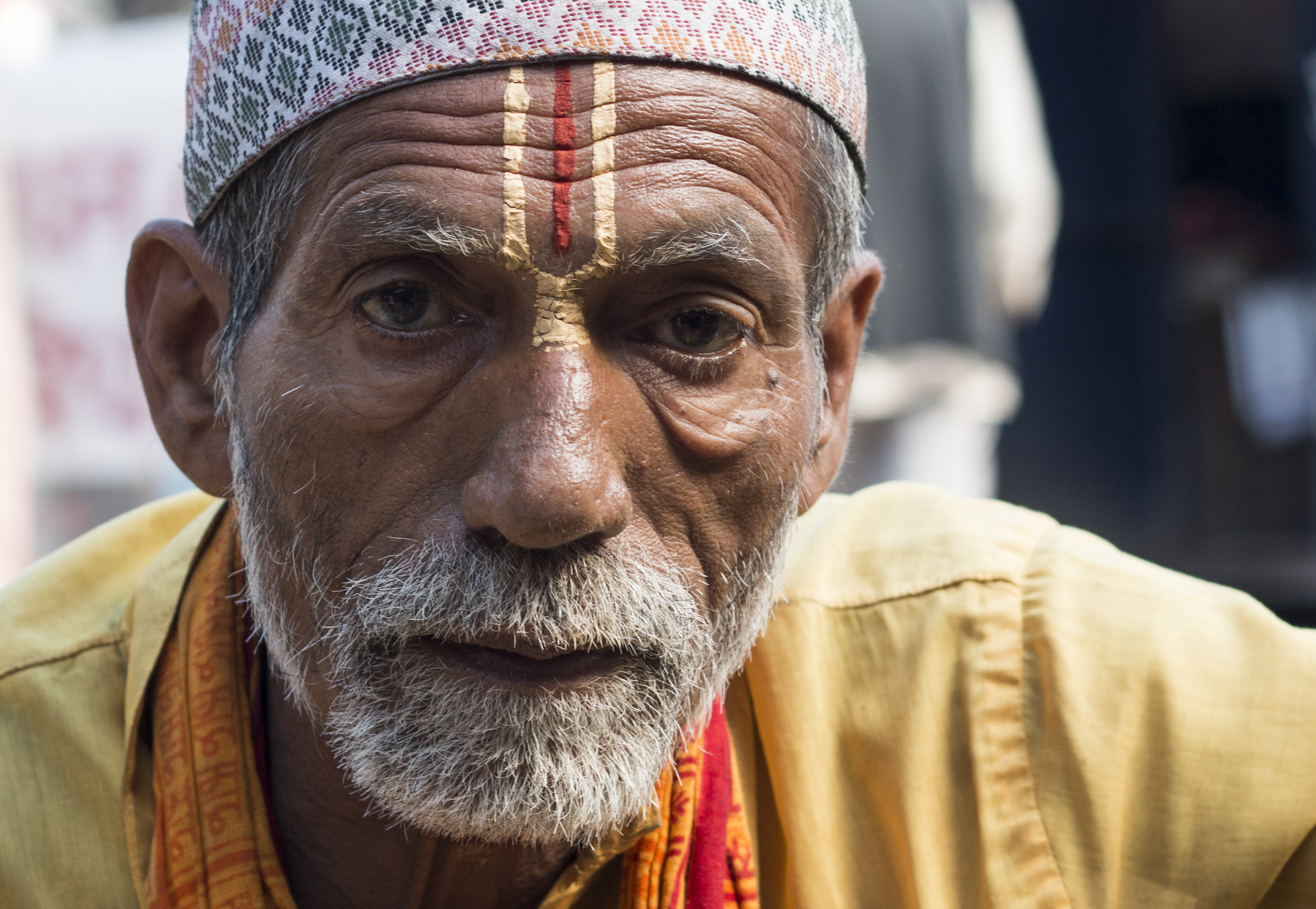
A Vaishnava Hindu with Tilaka (Urdhva Pundra).

- The first line is equated to Garhapatya (the sacred fire in a household kitchen), the A syllable of Om, the Rajas guna, the earth, the external Atman, Kriyā – the power of action, the Rigveda, the morning extraction of Soma, and Maheshvara.
- The second streak of ash is a reminder of Dakshinagni (the holy fire lighted in the South for ancestors), the sound U of Om, Sattva guna, the atmosphere, the inner Atman, Iccha – the power of will, the Yajurveda, midday Soma extraction, and Sadasiva.
- The third streak is the Ahavaniya (the fire used for Homa), the M syllable in Om, the Tamas guna, Svarga – heaven, the Paramatman – the highest Atman (Brahman), the power of perception, the Samaveda, Soma extraction at dusk, and Shiva.

The "Tri" in the word Tripundra signifies the Triguna – Satva, Raja and Tama; Triloka – Bhuhu, Bhuvaha, Suvaha; Tritapa – Bbhoutika, Daivika, Adhyatmika. Tripundra is also called as Bhasma or Vibhuti. Tripundra also signifies Prana or life force and the three responsibilities performed by Brahma, Vishnu and Shiva respectively. Brahma represents Creation, Vishnu denotes Sustenance and Shiva connotes Destruction. Thus Tripundra symbolises Holy Trinity of Hindu Gods Brahma, Vishnu and Shiva. Tripundra Applying Tripundra on the forehead is termed as "Bhasma dharana". The word Bhasma means calcined ash. Those who wear Tripundra on their forehead, often recite the mantras of the Lord while remembering its spiritual meaning and it is not just a sign of culture or identification.

== Regional nomenclature ==
Tripundra is called திருநீறு / Thiruneeru in Tamil and ತಿರುನಾಮ / Thirunama in Kannada. It is also known as Tripundraka.

== See also ==
- Vibhuti
- Bindi
- Tilaka
- Paklei Namsa
- Urdhva Pundra
