= Bhasmajabala Upanishad =

Shaiva Hindu text

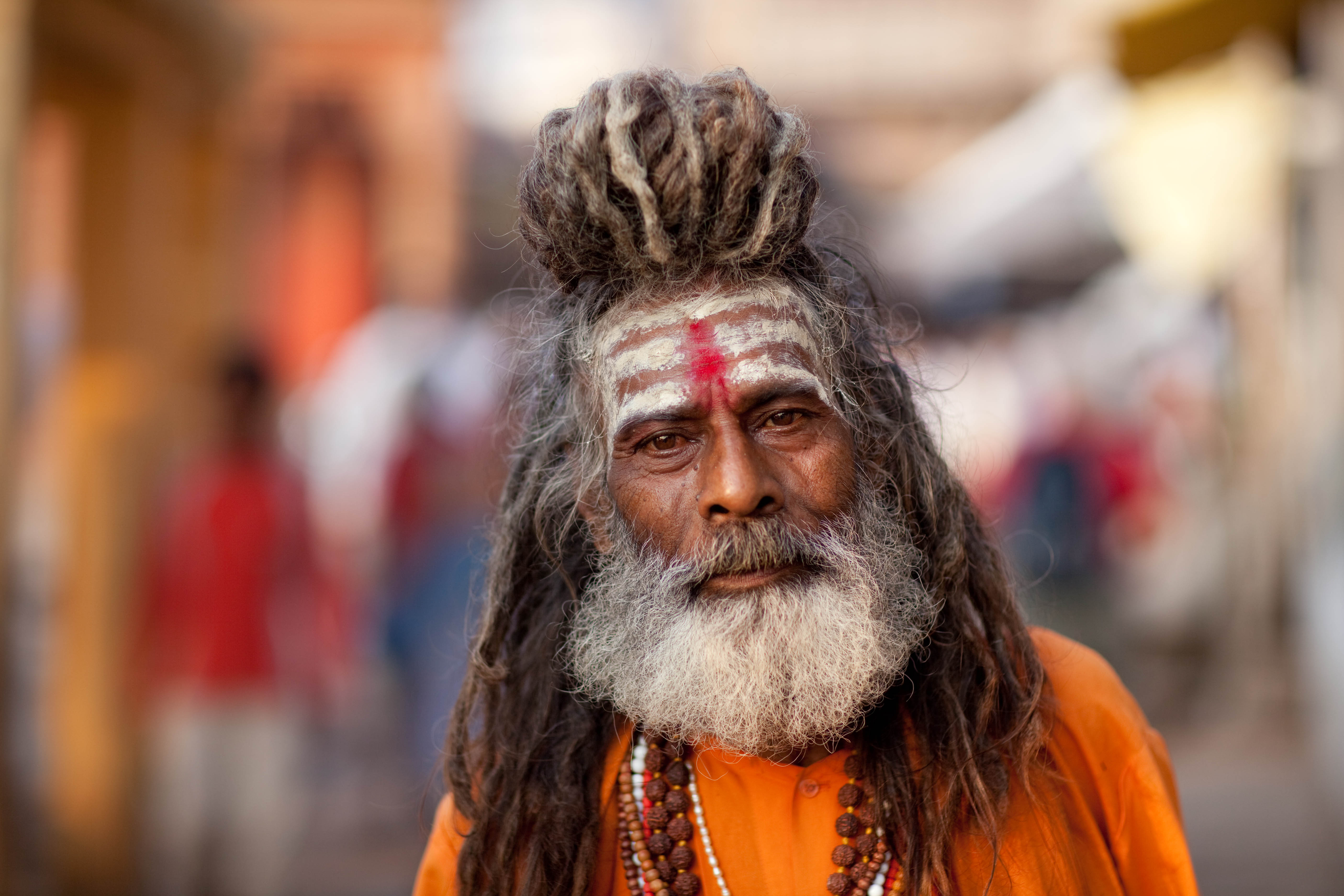
- A Shaiva sadhu in Varanasi with the Tripundra (three lines of ash) on the forehead and wearing Rudraksha necklaces.
- Devanagari: भस्मजाबाल
- Title means: Sacred ash (Bhasma) - Jabala
- Date: late medieval
- Type: Shaiva
- Linked Veda: Atharvaveda
- Chapters: 2
- Verses: 69

Bhasmajabala Upanishad (Sanskrit: भस्मजाबाल उपनिषत्) is one of the minor Shaiva Upanishads of Hinduism written in Sanskrit language. It is associated with the Atharvaveda.

The Bhasmajabala Upanishad, in a manner similar to Brihajjabala Upanishad and Akshamalika Upanishad describes Vibhuti (Bhasma) or sacred ash, and Rudraksha beads as symbols and for body art. The text describes how the ash and beads are to be produced, its application on the body. The importance of holy city of Varanasi and its Shiva temple are mentioned in the text.

Klaus Klostermaier classifies the text along with the Brihajjabala Upanishad, the Rudrakshajabala Upanishad, the Kalagni Rudra Upanishad and the Akshamalika Upanishad as Shaiva texts that explain symbolism of rites and objects of worship in Shaivism.

== History ==
The date of composition and the author of this text are unknown. Like most sectarian Upanishads, the text is likely a late medieval, post-12th century era Upanishad and it is neither part of the 17th century compilation of 50 important Hindu Upanishads published by Mughal era Dara Shikoh, nor part of the 18th-century anthology of 52 popular Upanishads in North India published by Colebrooke, nor is it found in the Bibliotheca Indica anthology of popular Upanishads in South India by Narayana.

In a Telugu language anthology of 108 Upanishads of the Muktika in the modern era, narrated by Rama to Hanuman, it is listed at serial number 87.

The manuscripts of this and related Saiva Upanishads, states Friedrich Otto Schrader, exist in different versions in North India and South India, with differences in content, how the sections are arranged and length, in the Grantha and Devanagari palm leaf manuscript compilations.

== Structure ==
The Bhasmajabala Upanishad is presented in two parts. The first part, with 17 verses, explained by Bhusunda Jabala, prescribes the procedure for making the Bhashma and its smearing; the second part, with 52 verses, narrates the conversation between Bhusunda Jabala and Shiva giving details about the Gods to be worshipped, and procedures for worship.

== Contents ==
I am this world and the five elements. I am the Highest Truth that exists, the Brahman of the Upanishads. This is the greatest Vidya.

—Bhasmajabala Upanishad

In the first section, Sage Bhusunda Jabala (descendant of Sage Jabali) goes to Mount Kailash, the abode of the god Shiva, and offers obeisance to the deity. Shiva's iconography is described as having the form of Om, three eyes, wearing a tiger skin and holding an antelope in his hand. His whole body is smeared with Bhasma, sacred ash, and he wears the Tripundra, three horizontal lines of Bhasma on the forehead, and is described as Infinite and the Supreme Being. The sage worships Shiva with bilva leaves and Bhasma. Then he appeals to Shiva to enlighten him on the norms of the Tripundra and thus acquire emancipation. He asks Shiva to let him understand the process of making Bhasma, what and how many hymns to be chanted while preparing it, when and how to apply it, and who are the people seeking it.

At the dawn hours, states the text, cow dung should be gathered and placed on the leaves of Aswattha tree (sacred fig), dried by any process of heat by uttering the Triyambaka mantra; then lit up to produce the sacred ash. Oil seeds dipped in ghee to the fire with the help of a Sami leaf shaped into a spoon, which action will rid him of all his sins.

Taking a sample of the Bhasma in his palm, one should sanctify it by the Vamadeva mantra, mix it with water, and then smear the wet ashes over his body from top to toe while reciting the five mantras of the Pancha Brahman. Following this, with the ashes smeared in his three middle fingers, he should perform the ritual known as "Bhasma Dharana": drawing three horizontal lines (the Tripundra) across his forehead, concurrently uttering the Agner Bhusmasi mantra and murdhanam mantras. One should also make similar ash marks on the neck, cheeks, eyes, mouth, chest, navel, arms on its middle parts, and the wrists, the back side of the palms, and the shoulder.

Smearing of the body with Bhasma is to be done thrice daily (morning, midday, and evening). One should also drink some part the water sanctified with the Bhasma by uttering the Apahpununtu mantra. The sacred ash smearing rite is recommended by the text for all four stages of the life (See Ashrama (stage)).

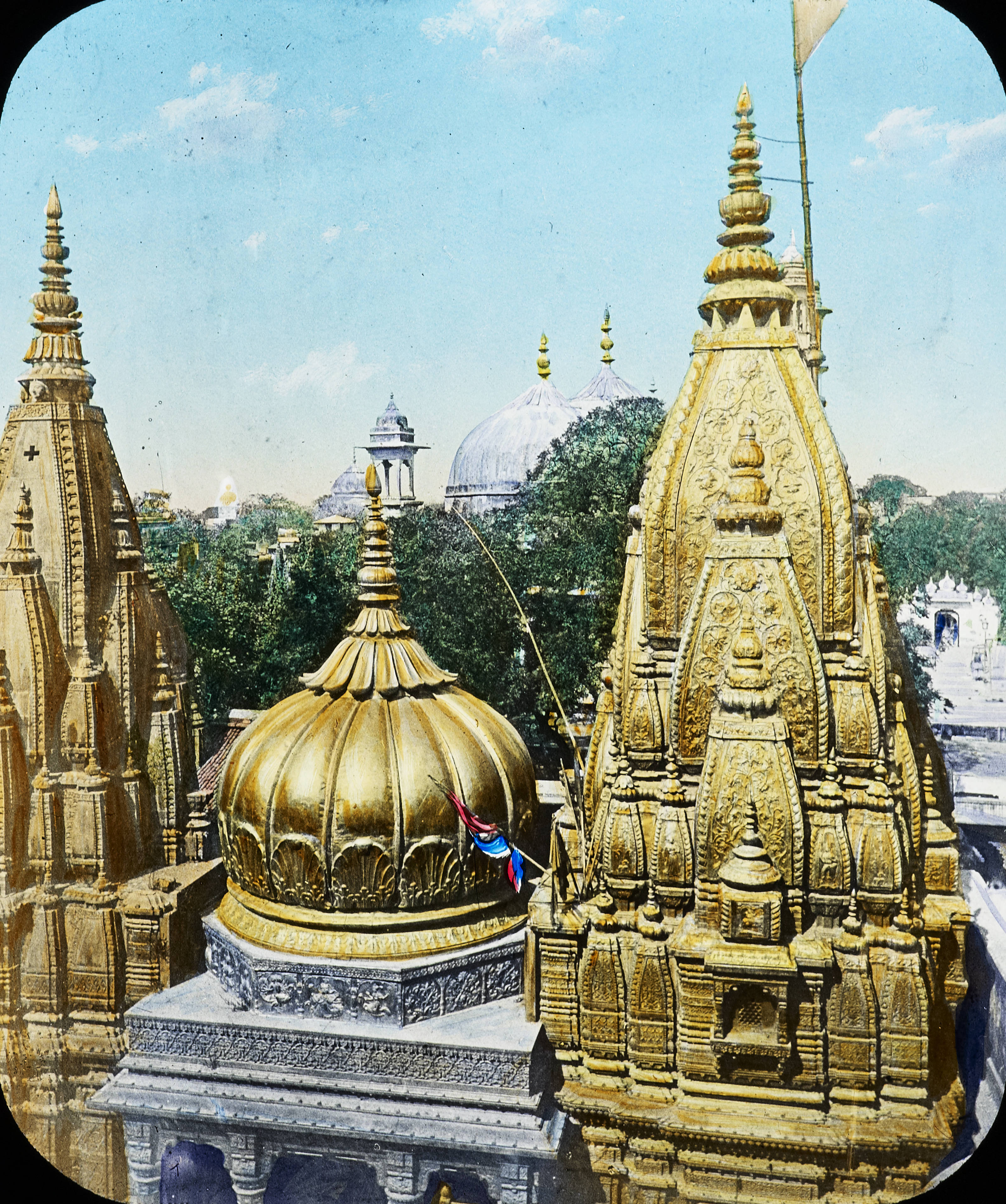
The temple of Shiva in Varanasi

In the second part of the Upanishad, Bhusunda Jabala is taught by Shiva about worship. After early morning ablutions, one should recite the Rudrasuktas, apply Bhasma and make the Tripundra marks on the body. and wear white Rudraksha beads; the positions of wearing the Rudraksha on the body are described. This should be followed by offering daily sandhya prayers and by Homa (fire-sacrifice). Seated on a munja grass mat, one should meditate on the form of Shiva. Shiva's icon lingam should be worshipped with bilva leaves and various mantras, which are listed.

Goddess Parvati, states the Upanishad, is the all-pervading One and Creator of Time, various deities, and worlds. Shiva is asserted as the Supreme, Omnipresent, and Omniscient one, who sustains everything. The text identifies Shiva as Brahman, Atman (soul), the elements, and Knowledge.

=== Holy city of Benares ===
The Upanishad asserts that those who feel incapable of yogic meditation form of Shiva realization should move to Varanasi and live there.

The holy city of Varanasi (Kashi) is stated by the text to be on Shiva's trishula (trident), and one who dies there becomes part of him. Five sacred places in Varanasi are mentioned by the text, including the jyotirlinga (a sacred lingam of Shiva) enshrined in the Kashi Vishwanath Temple. Like the ancient Jabala Upanishad, this late text asserts that those who die in Varanasi are imparted the Taraka mantra by Shiva moments before death and thus they attain salvation. Varanasi is described as the ultimate place to worship Shiva in the Upanishad.

== Influence ==
The rituals of Bhasma-snana (ash-bath), and application of Tripundra instead of the ash-bath, are significant Shaiva practices.

The rites described in this late text are found in Shaiva traditions. The Tripuṇḍra, three horizontal lines, on the forehead as well as other body parts are symbols of initiation and sacred rites of passages, and for some a daily practice. These lines, states Antonio Rigopoulos, represent Shiva's threefold power of will (icchāśakti), knowledge (jñānaśakti), and action (kriyāśakti). The Tripuṇḍra described in this and other Shaiva texts also symbolizes Shiva's trident (triśūla) and the divine triad of Brahmā, Vishnu, and Shiva.
