= Tilaka =

Mark worn on the forehead and other parts of the body

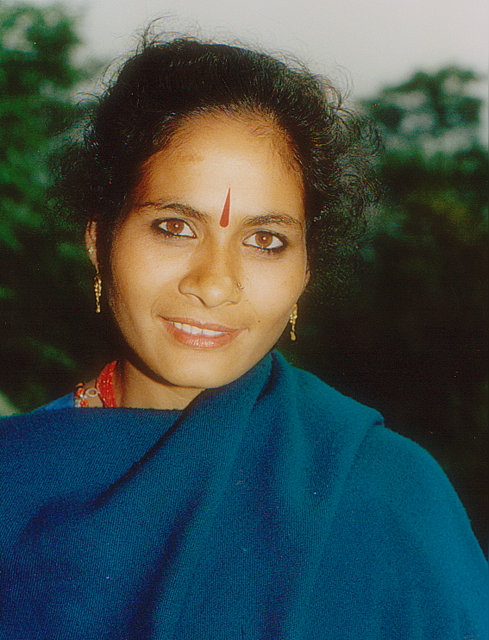
A woman with a tilaka on her forehead

In Hinduism, the tilaka, colloquially known as a tika, is a mark, most often applied to the forehead at the point of the ajna chakra (third eye or spiritual eye), though it may also appear on other parts of the body such as the neck, hand, chest, or the arm. The tilaka may be applied daily for decorative purposes, as a symbol of religious affiliation, for rites of passage, or other special spiritual and religious occasions, dependent on regional custom. It is also used to honour and welcome someone upon arrival.

Tilakas vary widely in shape and are made from various substances, including "ash from sacrificial fire or cow dung, sandalwood paste, turmeric, clay, charcoal or red lead."

== Variations and meaning ==
Different Hindu denominations use different materials and shapes to make the tilaka.

=== Vaishnavite tilakas ===
Traditionally, a staunch Vaishnavite marks twelve parts of the body with tilakas and other symbols, but the most prominent tilaka is displayed on the forehead. The Vaishnava tilaka, also known as urdhva pundra, consists of a two or three vertical lines starting from just below the hairline to almost the end of one's nose tip, and intercepted in the middle by an elongated U. The style of the urdhva pundra varies in each Vaishnavite sect throughout India and can be made with sandalwood paste or various other materials.

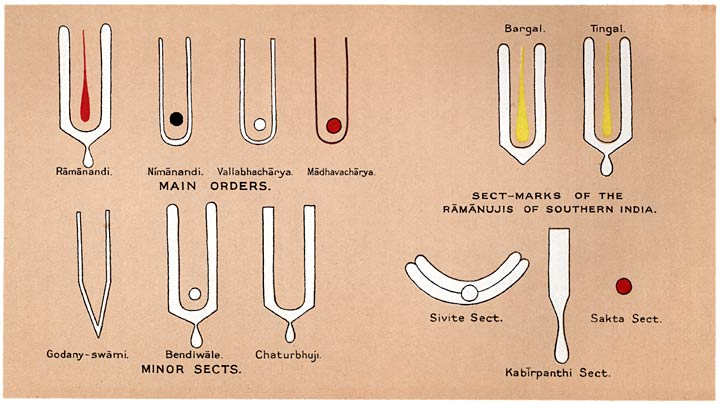
Examples of Tilaks or sect-marking in British India, summarised by 19th-century scholar Russell

According to Dr. Vijay Prakash Sharma, the known styles include:

- Vijayshree – a white urdhva pundra tilaka with a white line in the middle, founded by Swami Balanand of Jaipur;
- Bendi tilaka – a white urdhva pundra tilaka with a white round mark in the middle, founded by Swami Ramprasad Acharya of Badasthan Ayodhya; and
- Chaturbhuji tilaka – white urdhva pundra tilaka with the upper portion turned 90 degrees in the opposite direction, no shri in the middle, founded by Narayandas of Bihar, ascetics of Svarg Dvar of Ayodhya follow it.

Additional styles include: Vallabha Sampradaya Tilaka; Sri Tilaka of Rewasa Gaddi; Ramacharandas Tilaka; Srijiwarama tilaka; Sri Janakraja Kishori Sharan Rasik Aliji tilaka; Sri Rupkalajee tilaka; Rupsarasji tilaka; Ramasakheeji tilaka; Kamanendu Mani tilaka; Karunasindhuji tilaka; Swaminarayana Tilaka; Nimbarka tilaka; and Madhva tilaka.

The Vasudeva Upanishad, a Vaishnava text, explains the significance of three vertical lines in urdhva pundra tilaka to be a reminder of Brahma, Vishnu, Shiva; the Vedic scriptures – Rigveda, Yajurveda and Samaveda; three worlds Bhu, Bhuva, Svar; the three syllables of Om – a, u, m; three states of consciousness – awake, dream sleep, deep sleep; three realities – Maya, Brahman and Atman; the three bodies – sthula, sukshma, and karana.

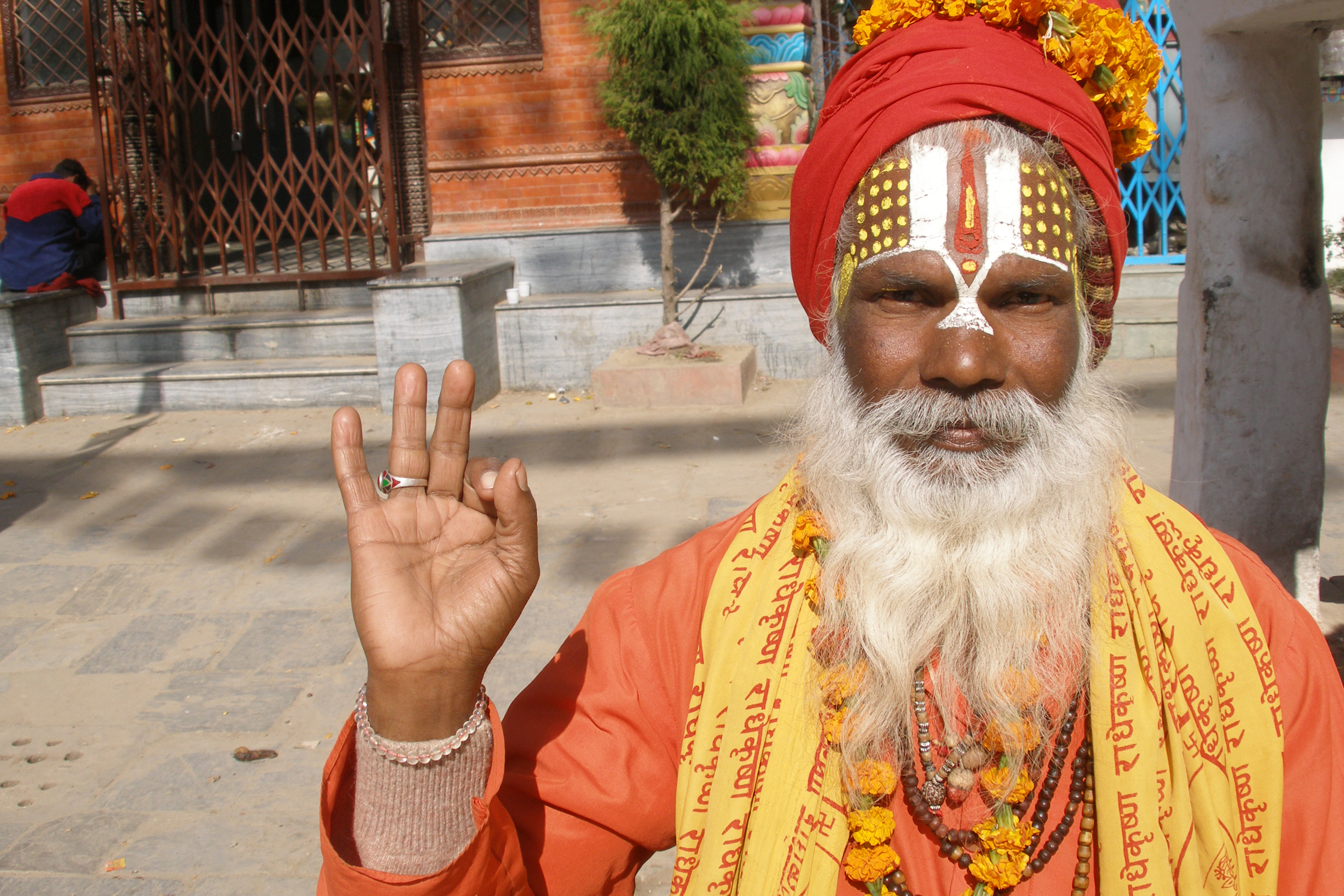
A sadhu in Nepal wearing tilaka

=== Shaivite tilakas ===
The Tripundra or Rudra-tilaka is the other major tilaka variant, often worn by the followers of Shiva. It consists of three horizontal bands across the forehead with a single vertical band or circle in the middle. This is traditionally done with sacred ash from sacrificial fires, also known as vibhuti. The use of vibhuti is symbolic of detachment to the world or renunciation. This variant is the more ancient of the two and shares many common aspects with similar markings worn across the world.

Chapter 2 of the Kalagni Rudra Upanishad, a Shaiva traditional text, explains the three lines of a Tilaka as a reminder of various triads: three sacred fires, three syllables in Om, three gunas, three worlds, three types of atman (self), three powers in oneself, first three Vedas, three times of extraction of the Vedic drink Soma.

- The first line is equated to Garhapatya (the sacred fire in a household kitchen), the A syllable of Om, the Rajas guna, the earth, the external self, Kriyā – the power of action, the Rigveda, the morning extraction of Soma, and Maheshvara.
- The second streak of ash is a reminder of Dakshinagni (the holy fire lighted in the South for ancestors), the sound U of Om, Sattva guna, the atmosphere, the inner self, Iccha – the power of will, the Yajurveda, midday Soma extraction, and Sadashiva.
- The third streak is the Ahavaniya (the fire used for Homa), the M syllable in Om, the Tamas guna, Svarga – heaven, the Paramatman – the highest self (the ultimate reality of Brahman), Jnana – the power of knowledge, the Samaveda, Soma extraction at dusk, and Shiva.

These lines, represent Shiva's threefold power of will (icchāśakti), knowledge (jñānaśakti), and action (kriyāśakti). The Tripuṇḍra described in this and other Shaiva texts also symbolises Shiva's trident (trishula) and the divine triad of Brahma, Vishnu, and Shiva.

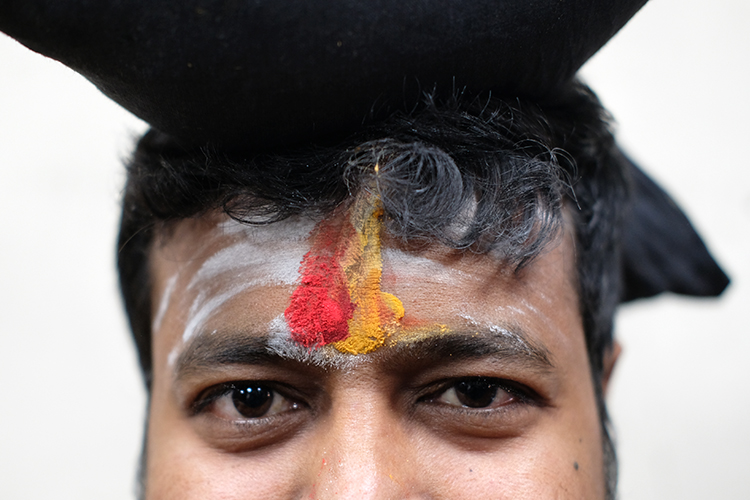
A devotee of Ayyappan wearing tilaka.

=== Other Hindu denominations ===
Shaktas, worshippers of the various forms of the Goddess (Devi), wear a red dot on the forehead in the middle of three horizontal lines or a semicircular line.

Followers of Ganapatya use red sandal paste (rakta candana).

== Other traditions ==
Jains wear the tilaka to mark the forehead of Jaina images with sandalwood paste, during puja ceremonies. It may also be used, for the same reason, to mark idols at the start of a puja (worship), to mark a rock or tree before it is cut or removed from its original place for artisan work, or to mark a new piece of property.

== Relationship to bindi ==
Although the bindi is related to the tilaka there are a few notable differences. Bindi is a stick-on alternative worn by women of the Indian religions on the forehead - not by men. Generally, married women wear red or maroon symbolizing good fortune. Today, bindis are offered in an assortment of colors and shapes to better co-ordinate with Indian dress.
