= Akshamalika Upanishad =

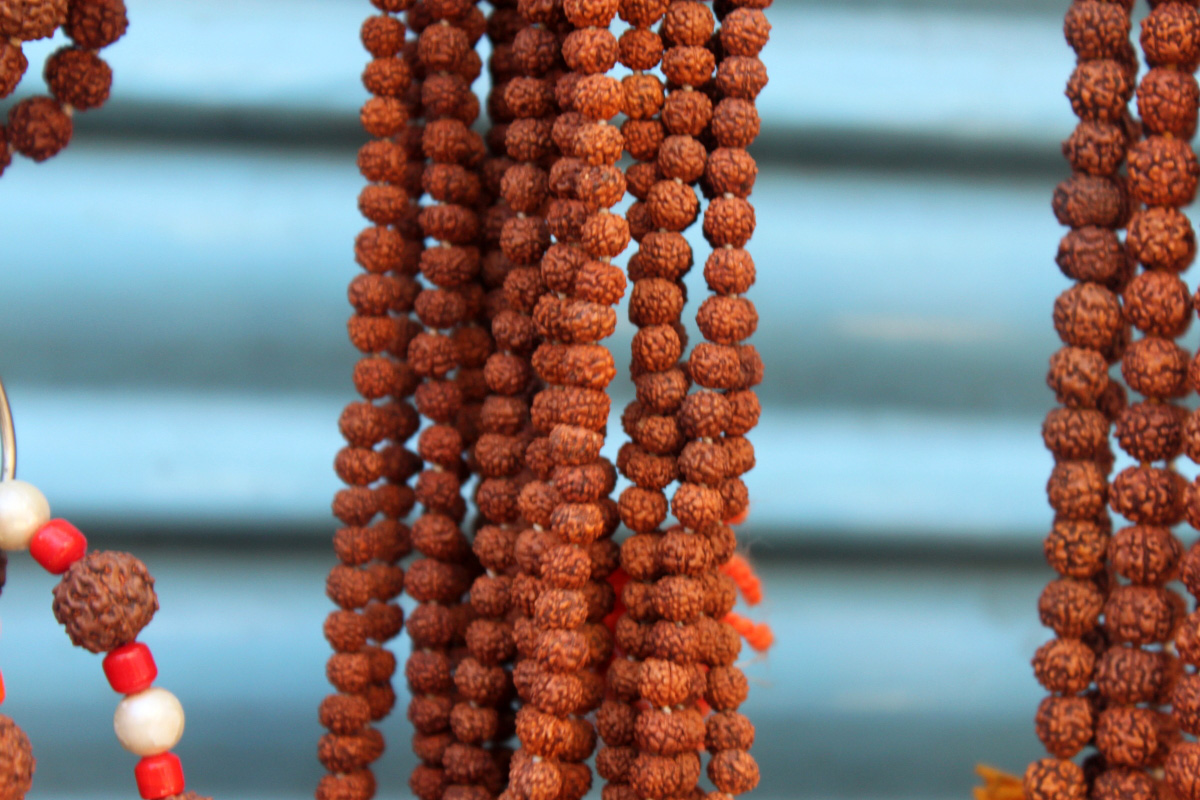
- Akshamala with Rudraksha beads.
- Devanagari: अक्षमालिका
- IAST: akṣamālikā
- Title means: Rosary of Sanskrit Alphabet
- Date: late medieval
- Type: Shaiva
- Linked Veda: Rigveda
- Philosophy: Shaivism, Vedanta

The Akshamalika Upanishad (Sanskrit: अक्षमालिका उपनिषद्, Akṣamālika Upaniṣad) is a Sanskrit text and one of the minor Upanishads of Hinduism. It is associated with the Rigveda. It is one of 14 Shaiva (Shiva-related) Upanishads.

The Upanishad describes akshamala (rosary) and its importance in japa, the meditative repetition of a mantra. The text mentions different types of rosaries, their significance, the relevant mantras, and the symbolism. The inner thread of Japa Mala, states the text, signifies the Ultimate Reality (Brahman-Atman), the silver thread on its right symbolizes Shiva, the copper thread on left of Vishnu, the face is Sarasvati, the bottom is Gayatri, the hole of each bead a reminder of Jnana (knowledge), and the knot is Prakriti (nature).

Klaus Klostermaier classifies this text with the Bhasmajabala Upanishad, the Rudrakshajabala Upanishad, the Brihajjabala Upanishad and the Kalagni Rudra Upanishad as Shaiva texts that explain symbolism of rites and objects of worship in Shaivism. While this Shaiva Upanishadic text discusses consecration and use of rosary for meditation, the use of rosary is common in other traditions.

It is also known as Aksamalikopanisad.

== Name ==
The akshamala denotes a string made up of beads where each bead represents the 50 letters of the alphabet, a (अ) to ksha (क्ष), hence it is known as Akshamalika Upanishad. Alternate names for rosaries, states Ernst Leumann, that appear in Jaina and Hindu texts are akshamala, akshamalika, akshasutra, rudrashamala, carcakamala and japamala.

== History ==
The date of composition and the author of this text are unknown. Like most sectarian Upanishads, the text is likely a late medieval, post-12th century era Upanishad and it is neither part of the 17th century compilation of 50 important Upanishads published by Mughal era Dara Shikoh, nor part of the 18th-century anthology of 52 popular Upanishads in North India published by Colebrooke, nor is it found in the Bibliotheca Indica anthology of popular Upanishads in South India by Narayana.

In a Telugu language anthology of 108 Upanishads of the Muktika in the modern era, narrated by Rama to Hanuman, it is listed at serial number 67.

== Contents ==
The Akshamalika Upanishad is structured as a discourse between Prajapati and Guha (Kartikeya, the god of war). Prajapati asks Guha about the akshamala (rosary): its rules, types, colours, materials used for making it, threads, and so forth.

Guha replies that the rosary can be made of 10 things: coral or rubies (varies in translations), pearls, marble or crystal, shankha (conch), silver or Tulsi (varies in translations), gold, sandalwood, Putrajiva - fruits of the fiscus tree, lotuses and rudrakshas. Gold, silver and copper threads, states the text, are used on either side. It should have fifty beads, corresponding to the characters of Sanskrit alphabet. The beads should be worn in a circle, the "face" of the bead should touch the face of another and bases of the beads should be aligned.

The internal thread of gold represents the Supreme Brahman. The silver thread of the right and copper thread on the left symbolize the gods Shiva and Vishnu respectively. The face and base of the beads denote goddesses Sarasvati and Gayatri. The holes are Knowledge and the knot of the thread is Prakriti (Nature). The beads representing vowels, mute consonants and other consonants should be white, yellowish and red and denote sattva, tamas and rajas gunas respectively.

The text thereafter asserts the procedure for consecration of the akshamala. It should be bathed in milk of five types of cows, followed by five products from a cow (Panchagavya), and then sprinkled with Darbha grass water. The beads, states the text, should then be immersed in sandalwood water reciting Omkara (ओमाङ्कारा). Then, it be smeared with eight fragrant pastes, placed on a bed of flowers and each bead be consecrated and woven with a mantra related to the corresponding 50 letters of the alphabet (a to ksha), invoking the characters to be resident in the beads. The 50 mantras – each of which narrates the powers of the specific character (16 vowels followed by 34 consonants) – are listed. The gods residing in earth, space and heaven as well as the ancestors are invited to dwell in the beads. The akshamala is to be treated as a goddess, and used in meditation, states the text. It expiates sin, asserts the text.

== Influence ==
The use of 108 beaded Akshamala is not limited to Shaiva tradition, but found in other Hindu traditions such as Vaishnavas, as well as among the Buddhists. The method of consecration and invocation with mantras is similar in all these traditions.

The origins of the use of rosary for prayers and meditation among Jesuits and Roman Catholic monks, states Guy Beck, is traceable to India.
