= Tripura Upanishad =

Goddess-related Hindu text

- Devanagari: त्रिपुरा
- IAST: Tripurā
- Title means: No city
- Date: ~15th-century CE
- Type: Shakta
- Linked Veda: Rigveda
- Chapters: 1
- Verses: 16
- Philosophy: Shaktism, Vedanta

The Tripura Upanishad (Sanskrit: त्रिपुरा उपनिषद्, IAST: Tripurā Upaniṣad) is a medieval era minor Upanishad of Hinduism. Composed in Sanskrit, the text is classified as a Shakta Upanishad and attached to the Rigveda. As an Upanishad, it is part of the corpus of Vedanta literature that presents the philosophical concepts of Hinduism.

The Tripura Upanishad places the goddess Tripura Sundari as the ultimate Shakti (energy, power) of the universe.. The text is one of the important texts of the Shakta tradition and notable for its theory of Tripura (literally "three cities") symbolizing the three roads of work, worship and wisdom.

Douglas Brooks states that the text is historically notable as being "as close to an introduction to Shakta Tantrism as we may find", distilling into its 16 verses almost every important topic in Shakta Tantra tradition. The text presents the Srividya yantra as a means of meditation. The text links the Shakti Tantra tradition as a Vedic attribute, however this link has been contested by scholars.

The philosophical premises in this text as in many Shakta Upanishads, states June McDaniel, is syncretism of Samkhya and Advaita Vedanta schools of Hindu philosophy, called Shaktadavaitavada (literally, the path of nondualistic Shakti).

== History ==
The author and the date when Tripura Upanishad was composed are unknown. The text was likely composed in the same period as other Shakta Upanishads, between the 12th- and 15th-century CE. Buhnemann suggests the Tripura Upanishad was probably composed after the 15th-century CE. While this text is a relatively late composition in the Upanishadic collection, literary evidence confirms that Shakta Tantrism has roots in ancient times and the interaction between Vedic and Tantric traditions trace back to at least the sixth century. Geoffrey Samuel notes that the surge in Tantra tradition developments during the late medieval period, were responses to Islamic invasions and political instability in parts of India and Tibet after 14th-century CE.

The text was translated by AG Krishna Warrier in 1967. However, Brooks has questioned both the translation and its conservative modern interpretation, arguing that they are inconsistent with how the text was interpreted by 15th- to 18th-century scholars such as Bhaskararaya in their bhasya (review and commentary).

The Upanishad has survived into the modern times in two recensions, one attached to the Rigveda and other to the Atharvaveda. Manuscripts of this text are also found titled as Tripuropanisad. In the Telugu language anthology of 108 Upanishads of the Muktika canon, narrated by Rama to Hanuman, it is listed at number 82. The Tripura Upanishad is complemented by Bhavana Upanishad, and the text accompanies the tantra rituals text Parasurama Kalpasutra in Shakta traditions.

=== Name ===
The title Tripura means "three cities". It refers to the Tantric idea that everything, including the transcendental reality is of triadic form and function, manifesting from one unity. The triads occur, for example, as "creator, creation, and the process of creativity", "will, action and knowledge", "knower, object of knowledge, and the process of knowing", three Devas, three Shaktis (energies), three svaras (musical notes), and other forms. These simultaneously emerge from and coalesce into Tripurasundari Devi.

Brooks states that she is epistemologically envisioned as "the measurer, the measuring and the thing measured"; She has the nature of Shiva, Shakti and Atman (soul, self); she is all creation in latent and manifested forms; and she establishes the nondualistic identity of the Absolute Brahman with the individual soul (Atman), states Brooks.

The term Upanishad means it is knowledge or "hidden doctrine" text that belongs to the corpus of Vedanta literature presenting the philosophical concepts of Hinduism and considered the highest purpose of its scripture, the Vedas.

== Contents ==
The text mentions Srichakra above.

Some recensions of the manuscripts include a prelude and an epilogue in the form of a prayer asserting that the Vedas must be imbibed in one's mind, thoughts and speech, and through truth only is peace assured.

The main text consists of 16 verses. This number 16 is significant in the Tantra tradition, and constitutes the sixteen syllabic structure of the Mula-Mantra, or root manta of its Srividya's school. The main message is contained in its 15 verses, to which a sixteenth verse is appended, exactly like the way the yantra is designed wherein the sixteenth syllable is appended to its core fifteen elements. Thus the architectural elements of the Upanishad mirror the architecture of the Srividya mantra.

The Srividya presented in the Tripura Upanishad, has been described by the medieval Tantra scholar Bhaskararaya to one of realizing that "Devi within each human being is a means to know and attain one's own real nature", that personal liberation and freedom (moksha) is a "process of reintegration", a journey of knowing one's inner roots and returning to it. It is a path to become one with Ultimate Reality, the Brahman. Genuine religious freedom, asserts Bhaskararaya in his commentary on Tripura Upanishad, is achievable only with autonomy and realization of one's nature.

The text is considered, in Shakta tradition, to be rooted in Rigveda hymns, with Rig hymn 5.47.4 considered as a form of Srividya, the most important mantra in many Shakti traditions. However, this claim of Rig Vedic roots has been controversial, and is disputed as an esoteric interpretation, by mainstream orthodox traditions of Hindu philosophy, states Brooks.

The text introduces goddess Tripura in verses 1 through 5 as supreme Shakti. The triadic theology permeates the construction of the verses as well as the message. Thus, states Brooks, she is presented as the Sthularupa (literally, physical anthropomorphic icon), Suksmarupa (subtle sound, mantra icon), and Pararupa (transcendent diagrammatic, yantra icon). The Upasana (contemplative worship) is similarly presented as the triad of Bahiryaga (outer devotion), Japa (silent repetition), and Antaryaga (inner devotion). Verses 2 and 3 also states that goddess Tripura is symbolized in nine ways, nine yogas, nine gods, nine healing deities, nine communicative forms representing all the three energies, and controlling the numerals, nine nineteen, twenty-nine, and ever radiant. Her worship through various methods of meditation is asserted by the text to lead to liberation.

The verse 6 of the Upanishad succinctly presents her relationship with Shiva, and introduces the names of fifteen goddesses, each an aspect of her as the sixteenth. The verses 8 and 9 of the text, states Brooks, present the syllables of its mantras in a technical, encoded vocabulary, whose details and meaning in the Tantra tradition is passed verbally from one generation to another, through a Guru. The text presents the encrypted code, but unlike other Upanishads in the Hindu tradition, does not explain or provide an outline of the code's esoteric meanings. These mantras of the Tripura Upanishad are also referred to as Kadi vidya and Hadi vidya.

The verses 10 through 12 state the upasana rituals and Srichakra worship, in verbal and diagrammatic images of Tripura, Shiva and self. The verse 13 is dedicated to meditation practice. Verses 14–15 assert ontological oneness between Shakti, Shiva and Atman, with the statement that through "knowledge that the self becomes one with Cosmic being".

== English translations ==
- Narasimhananda, Swami (January 2016). "Traditional Wisdom: Tripura Upanishad". Prabuddha Bharata. 121 (1): 1–8.

== See also ==
- Atharvashiras Upanishad – Sanskrit text, linked to Atharva Veda
- Devi Upanishad – Goddess-related Hindu text
- Mahanarayana Upanishad – Minor Upanishad of Hinduism
