= Atharvashikha Upanishad =

Hindu Shaiva text

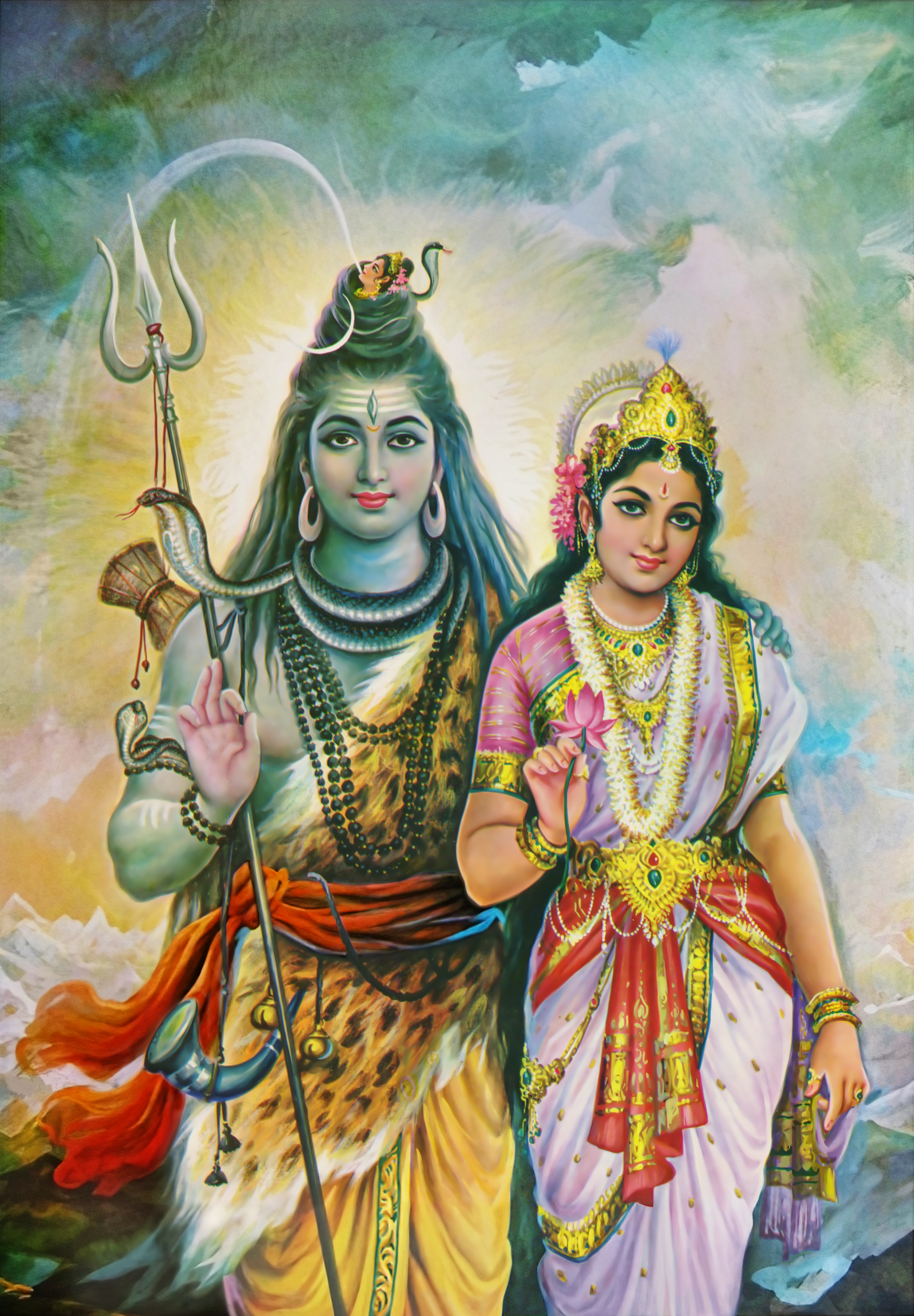
- Shiva, the primary addressee of this text, with his consort, Parvati
- Devanagari: अथर्वशिखा उपनिषद्
- IAST: Atharvaśikhā Upaniṣad
- Title means: Tip of the Atharvan
- Date: 1st millennium BCE
- Type: Shaiva
- Linked Veda: Atharvaveda
- Chapters: 2

The Atharvashikha Upanishad (IAST: Atharvaśikhā) is a Sanskrit text that is one of the minor Upanishads of Hinduism. It is among the 31 Upanishads associated with the Atharvaveda. It is classified as a Shaiva Upanishad, focussing on the destroyer god, Shiva.

The text is composed through the voice of the Sage Atharvan, to whom the Atharvaveda is eponymously attributed. The text discusses and equates Om symbol to Shiva as the Supreme Being and Brahman, explaining the spirituality behind its chanting and meditation. It declares Shiva to be higher than Brahma, Vishnu, Rudra, and Ishvara.

The text is also called Atharvashikhopanishad, and is listed at 23 in the Telugu language anthology of 108 Upanishads in Muktika canon.

== Nomenclature ==
The word "Atharvashikha", states Deussen, means the “Tip of the Atharvan”. Shikha also means "particular verse or formula" and "a tuft or lock of hair on the crown of the head".

== Chronology ==
Deussen states that the text is from the group of five Upanishads which assert god Shiva as a symbolism for Atman in Hinduism. Atharvashikha along with the other four Upanishads – Atharvashiras, Nilarudra, Kalagnirudra and Kaivalya – are ancient, with Nilarudra likely the oldest and Kaivalya the relatively later era Upanishad (still BCE) composed closer to the time of Shvetashvatara Upanishad, Mundaka Upanishad, and Mahanarayana Upanishad. Atharvashikha is probably among the later Upanishad in this group, and may be the stage of Hinduism where a transition occurred from Rudra, Ishana and related Vedic deities to one Shiva.

The Atharvashikha Upanishad is, states Parmeshwaranand, a relatively later era composition (still 1st millennium BCE), influenced by the Pashupata Shaivism.

== Structure ==
The Atharvashikha Upanishad is presented in two sections, with Section 1 dealing with what is meant by Om and the significance of its syllables, and Section 2 dealing with the benefits one derives by meditating coupled with reciting the word Om representing the four Vedas. The text focuses on OM mantra and its benefits.

The Atharvashikha Upanishad imitates and repeats some text from other Shaiva Upanishads such as the Atharvashiras Upanishad, while expanding on a few aspects covered by it. However, a difference between the two texts is that Atharvashiras never uses the word "Shiva" (instead uses Maheshvara), while Atharvashikha repeatedly uses the word Shiva.

== Content ==
The text discusses "Om" or "Aum" as symbolism for Shiva, Vishnu, Brahma, Rudra and Purusha-Brahman.

=== The object of meditation ===
The Upanishad opens with sages (Rishi) Pippalada, Angiras and Sanatkumara meeting sage Atharvan and ask, "which Dhyana (meditation) is highest?", "what does meditation comprise of and who should meditate", "what is the object of meditation?"

Om is the highest, replies Atharvan. The text explains the basic meaning of the divine Om mantra, representing the Para Brahman, the highest Brahman, the "Ultimate Reality". Om's has four legs, syllables, which symbolize the four gods and the four Vedic scriptures. It has also four heads, which stand for holy fires – Garhapatya, Dakshina, Ahavaniya and destructive fire.

The four syllables of Om – A (अ), U (उ), M (म) and the half part (्) are equated with empirical realities, abstract concepts, rituals and gods by the Atharvashikha Upanishad.

Atharvan explains that the first syllable of Om, "A", represents the Prithvi (Earth), the Rig Veda, the god Brahma – the Creator of the Trimurti, the color red, the eight Vasus, the gayatri meter, and Garhapatya, the sacred fire in a household.

The second syllable "U" denotes, states the text, the Akasha (sky), the Yajur Veda, the god Vishnu, the color black, the eleven Rudras, the Tristubh meter, and the Dakshinagni ritual fire.

The third syllable "M" represents Heavens, the Sama Veda, the color white, the god Rudra, the twelve Adityas, the Jagati meter and the Ahavaniya ritual fire.

The half fourth syllable, which is the hidden part that follows M, represents the Atharva Veda, Purusha (the Supreme Being), the spectrum of all colours, the Maruts deities, the Viraj meter and the Samvartaka fire which destroys creation. It reverberates as the sound of Brahman.

=== Om, Atman, Brahman and Shiva ===
The fourth half mora (syllable) of Om has three specific pronunciation modes – the short, long and the extra long, states the text. These are related specifically to the degrees of utterance – one, two, and three matras, units of vocal pronunciation. This fourth is sant-atman, or "calm-self".

The half syllable is absent in the long pronunciation, the sound which is identified as the illumination of the soul. When uttered as a long reverberation, asserts the text, it rises upwards, resonating with Om-kara, the universal sound.

Chapter 2 begins stating that Om is also called Pranava, because it makes all Pranas (vital breath, life force) to give Pranama (bow down). Om, states the text, should be meditated upon as the origin of the Vedas and origin of all the gods.

A meditation on Om relieves (Samtarayati) the meditator from fears and sorrows. As Vishnu in Om, it conquers all and fixes the mind in the highest Atman. As Brahma, it withdraws all senses. As Ishvara, it sets the whole world into activity. It is through Om that Brahma, Vishnu, Rudra and Ishvara came into being, as did all creatures and the deities of sensory organs in them.

Brahman, Vishnu and Rudra too,
The Lord and also the Blissful (Shiva)
Fivefold as these five gods,
The holy sound is proclaimed.

— Atharvashika Upanishad, Chapter 2, Translated by Paul Deussen

Even utterance of the word Om for a second is stated to be superior to performance of one hundred yajna sacrifices. Further, Shiva is equated to Om. All knowledge, all Yoga practice, all meditation is about Shiva Mahadeva, states the text.

The Om-sound, asserts the Upanishad, is Shiva.

== Commentary ==
The Hindu philosopher Adi Shankara (c. early 8th century CE), apart from providing commentary on major Upanishads, which are well recorded, is also credited with bhasya (commentary) on a few minor Upanishads which include the Atharvashikha Upanishad. This is considered highly doubtful by scholars such as Paul Hacker and Natalia Isaeva, and it is likely the minor Upanishads were commented on by different persons who were also named Shankaracharya.

== Bibliography ==
- Deussen, Paul (1997). Sixty Upanishads of the Veda. Motilal Banarsidass. ISBN 978-81-208-1467-7.
- Prasoon, Prof.S.K. (1 January 2008). Indian Scriptures. Pustak Mahal. ISBN 978-81-223-1007-8.
- Hattangadi, Sunder (1999). "अथर्वशिखोपनिषत् (Atharvashikha Upanishad)" (PDF) (in Sanskrit).
- Tinoco, Carlos Alberto (1997). Upanishads. IBRASA. ISBN 978-85-348-0040-2.
