= Vibhuti =

Sacred ash worn on forehead in Hindu culture

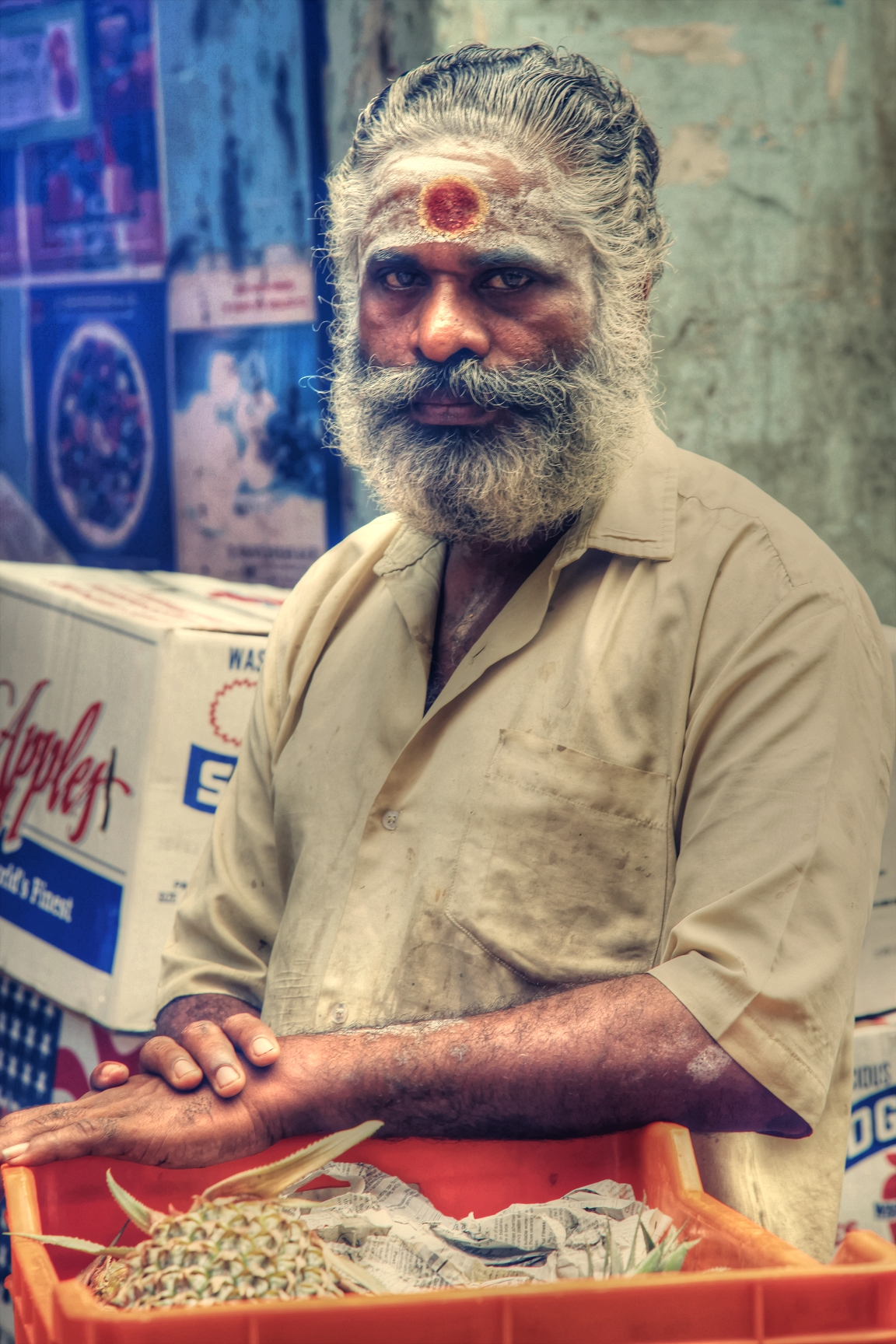
Hindu man, wearing tripundra

In Hinduism, vibhuti (Sanskrit: विभूति, romanized: vibhūti), also called bhasmam or tirunīru, is sacred ash made of burnt dried wood, burnt cow dung and/or cremated bodies used in Agamic rituals. Devotees of Shiva apply vibhuti traditionally as three horizontal lines across the forehead (also known as tripundra) and other parts of the body.

== Other uses ==
The Yoga Sutras use the term vibhuti to refer to mystical powers attained through the yogic practice of samyama.

Vaishnava theology describes a vibhuti as an 'incarnation of power', when a mortal is imbued with divine virtues and qualities.

Sri Aurobindo mentions a vibhuti as "the hero of a race's struggle towards divine achievement, the hero in the Carlylean sense of heroism, a power of God in man."

== Manufacture ==
In order for ash to be considered as vibhuti, it must be made not only of specific ingredients but also under certain ritually significant circumstances.

While adulteration of vibhuti is frowned upon, herbs or perfumes may be added either before burning or mixed into the powder after burning in order to provide fragrance.

=== Dung-based vibhuti ===
Fresh cow dung, preferably from Indian varieties of cow is collected and formed into cakes, balls, or sheets. Over a period of around a week the dung is set on a cloth or stone and dried in sunlight.

The dried dung is then arranged in layers either inside of a pit or in a freestanding pile, alternating dung with a thin layer of plant material such as rice husks and hay. The added plant material controls the burning of the dung. Vibhuti prepared in fire pits may be covered to restrict oxygen. Over a period of several days the fire results in the dung being reduced to a dark or, ideally, a pale grey or a white coloured ash. The balls of dung ash are then gathered and ground by hand or machine. The dried ash may be washed, collected as a paste, and re-dried, particularly to achieve a lighter colour if the initial ash was too dark.

=== Wood- or plant-based ===
Ashes made from various plants ascribed with spiritual or religious significance may be used rather than dung. The plant itself is often burnt in a homa. Individual users may prefer or avoid vibhuti from different types of plant depending on their astrological chart.

== See also ==
- Bindi
- Kumkum
- Rudraksha
- Tilaka
- Paklei Namsa
- Bhasmajabala Upanishad
- Brihajjabala Upanishad
