= Iccha-shakti =

Sanskrit term for willpower

Iccha-shakti (Sanskrit: इच्छाशक्ति, romanized: Icchāśakti, lit. 'will power') is a Sanskrit term translating to free will, desire, creative urge. It functions as the impulse towards manifestation within the principle of shakti, the concept of divine feminine energy. Along with kriya-shakti (Sanskrit: क्रियाशक्ति, romanized: Kriyāśakti, lit. 'action power') and jnana-shakti (Sanskrit: ज्ञानशक्ति, romanized: Jñānaśakti, lit. 'knowledge power'), iccha-shakti is described to constitute the three aspects of shakti in Hinduism, regarded to be responsible for the evolution of the universe in Tantra. In Shaivism, iccha-shakti represents one of the five shaktis of Shiva, alongside adi-shakti, parama-shakti, kriya-shakti, and jnana-shakti.

== Description ==
Many goddesses and consorts of male Hindu deities are described to act as their respective shakti, sometimes specified as kriya-shakti, such as Lakshmi for Vishnu, or their iccha-shakti, such as Parvati for Shiva. For deities with multiple consorts, a divine and earthly consort each is designated as the deity's kriya-shakti and iccha-shakti, such as Rukmini and Radha for Krishna, and Devasena and Valli for Murugan.

In the Sita Upanishad, the three forms of Lakshmi, stated to be Shri, Bhumi, and Nila, are described to be her three forms of iccha-shakti, assumed for the protection of the earth and stated to represent auspiciousness, holiness, and the sun, moon, and fire respectively.

In Yoga philosophy, the ida nadi (iccha-shakti) and the pingala nadi (kriya-sakti) when in balance allow for energy to flow into the sushumna nadi (jnana-shakti).
