= Atharvashiras Upanishad =

Sanskrit text, linked to Atharva Veda

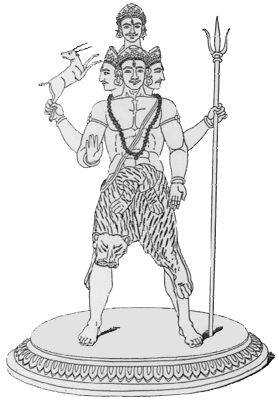
- Rudra
- Devanagari: अथर्वसिरस्
- IAST: Atharvaśiras
- Title means: Main point of the Atharvaveda
- Date: 1st millennium BCE
- Type: Shaiva
- Linked Veda: Atharvaveda
- Chapters: 7
- Philosophy: Pashupata, Vedanta

The Atharvashiras Upanishad (Sanskrit: अथर्वसिरस् उपनिषत्) is a Sanskrit text that is one of the minor Upanishads of Hinduism. It is among the 31 Upanishads associated with the Atharvaveda. It is classified as a Shaiva Upanishad focussed on god Rudra.

The Upanishad is notable for asserting that all gods are Rudra, everyone and everything is Rudra, and Rudra is the principle found in all things, their highest goal, the innermost essence of all reality that is visible or invisible. Rudra is Atman and Brahman, and in the heart. Rudra's symbol is Om, states the text, he can be realized by abandoning anger and lust, and through silence alone. The text is known for its monism (Advaita), and was quoted extensively by the German philosopher Hegel.

It is also known as Atharvasirasopanishad, Atharvashira, Atharvasira in some texts referencing it, and as Śira Upanishad in Muktikā canon of 108 Upanishads.

Being a Shaiva Upanishad, it is also known as Shiva-Atharva-Sheersham or Shivātharva-Sheersham.

== Chronology ==
The Atharvasiras Upanishad is an ancient text likely written in BCE, but its exact dating is uncertain. It is mentioned in Gautama Dharmasutras verse 19.12, Baudhayana Dharmasutra verse 3.10.10, Vasistha Dharmasutras verse 22.9 and elsewhere.

The Upanishad, states Parmeshwaranand, belongs to the category of "later Upanishads", and he dates it to approximately 5th century BCE. Deussen remarks that it is from the group of five Upanishads which assert god Shiva as a symbolism for Atman in Hinduism. These five Upanishads – Atharvashiras, Atharvashikha, Nilarudra, Kalagnirudra and Kaivalya – are ancient, with Nilarudra likely the oldest and Kaivalya the relatively later era Upanishad (still BCE) composed closer to the time of Shvetashvatara Upanishad, Mundaka Upanishad, and Mahanarayana Upanishad.

== Structure ==
The text consists of 7 chapters, mostly prose with some verses. Several versions of the text are known, and the surviving manuscripts show evidence of being corrupted.

== Contents ==
The importance of Self-knowledge

The wise who sees him (Rudra) as dwelling in himself,
He alone attains peace, and none else.

—Atharvashiras Upanishad, Chapter 5

=== Who is Rudra? ===
The Chapter 1 of the text begins with the answer to the question, "Who is Rudra?" He is introduced as that one "which existed at first, exists now and shall exist in future", the eternal and the non-eternal, the visible and the invisible, the Brahman and the non-Brahman, the east and west and north and south and above and below, the masculine and feminine and neuter, the Savitri and Gayatri, the appearance and the reality, the water and the fire, the cow and the buffalo, the lotus flower and the soma filter, the within and the without, the inner essence of everything.

This chapter references and includes fragments of hymns from Atharvaveda sections 4.1 and 10.8, Brihadaranyaka Upanishad section 6.1 and Chandogya Upanishad section 7.25, however it expresses those ideas through Rudra.

=== Rudra is the exalted one, is all gods, is universe ===
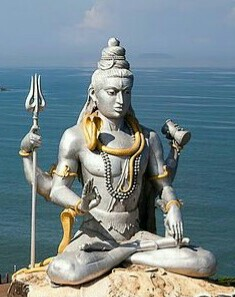
Rudra is described as the essence of all gods, all living beings, one with the universe and as Maheshvara in the text.

Chapter 2 is set in repeating verse style, of the form:

यो वै रुद्रः स भगवान्यश्च ब्रह्मा तस्मै वै नमोनमः
Rudra is the exalted one, he is Brahma, to him the salutation, the salutation!

— Atharvashiras Upanishad, 2.1

The same verse is repeated with Brahma replaced with the names of numerous gods (Vishnu, Skanda, Indra, Agni, Vayu, Surya and others), thereafter replaced by objects of nature, substances, direction, colors, mantras, concepts (Truth), with the last verse stating "Rudra is the exalted one, he is the Universe, to him salutation, the salutation".

Chapter 3 is set in prose, and continues to assert the oneness of everything and everyone as Rudra. He is asserted as growth, as prosperity, as peace, as all, as non-all, as whole, as non-whole, as done, as non-done, the principle behind everything and the highest goal of every living form and everything that changes.

The Upanishad then references and includes a fragment of hymn 8.48.3 of the Rigveda, stating that the one who has seen this light can have no fear of anyone's hostility or malice:

We have drunk Soma, have become immortal,
Have entered into the light, found out the gods!
What could the hostility harm us now,
What, O immortal, the malice of man!

— Atharvashiras Upanishad, Chapter 3

The soul, asserts the text, existed before the Soma and Surya. The whole world is Om symbol, and all deities, all vital breaths and He (Rudra) too is in the heart of each living being. Om is the holy call, Om is Rudra, he is infinite, he is protecting, he is the pure, he is the subtle, he is the lightning like, he is the highest Brahman, he is the One, he is the Rudra, he is the exalted Maheshvara, adds the text.

=== Rudra is Om, both symbolism for Atman, Brahman and the world ===
The Upanishad states that Rudra is resident in the soul in the heart. In chapter 4, the text offers mystical explanations to why Rudra is described the way he is. He is called Om, states the text, because when uttered he makes Prana go upwards. He is called the holy call because he is the essence of all the Vedas. He is called all prevading because he permeates the silence of the universe. He is called infinite because when uttered there is no end of it in any dimension, states the text.

He is called protecting, because he removes the fear of rebirth and suffering. He is called subtle, asserts the text, because uttering him makes the limbs tinge. He is called the highest Brahman because he is the highest of the highest, the highest goal, the strength that strengthens the strong. He is called the one because everything ends in him and he unites all creatures. He, asserts the text is called the exalted Maheshwara because from him all the Vedas flow and in him is raised through the perception of the Atman (soul, self) and the mastery of Yoga.

Rudra is in all men, omnipresent, he was born, and he will be born, he is in all the world spaces, begins chapter 5. One Rudra there is, states the Upanishad, and he has no second. He dwells in all living beings, and they return in him when they end. Through him, the whole universe spreads out. Whoever knows him, enters peace. He is unity, he is eternal, he is energy, he is Om, he is silence that follows Om.

=== Rudra is one without a second, the Pashupata ===
Chapter 5 of the text asserts that one should revere Rudra as one, he has no second. He dwells within, those who abandon anger, greed and worldly desires realize him and attain peace. Fire, states the text, is ultimately ashes, wind is ashes, water is ashes, earth is ashes, universe is ashes, the body and mind are ashes, and thus the Pashupata covers himself with ashes as a form of prayer.

Rudra is omniscient, omnipotent and omnipresent. One who seeks him gets immense bliss. Rudra is everywhere, he is all matter, he is in fire, he is in water, he has become plants and trees, he has become all living beings, states chapter 6 of the Upanishad. Nothing exists apart from Rudra. He is eternal, from which time is born. Nothing is earlier, and nothing later, he pervades all the world.

== Reception ==
The Atharvashiras Upanishad was one of the minor Upanishads that Georg Hegel, the German philosopher of the late Enlightenment, referred to as he presented Brahman in Indian philosophy in his scholarship. He wrote,

(Atharvashiras Upanishad...) which is dedicated to Shiva, who likewise speaks of himself, to an extent in most daring expressions of abstraction, which along this manner brings about a movement leading to unity: what has been, is Rudra; and what is, is He; and what will be, is He; Always was I, always am I, and always will I be. (...) What is, am I; and what is not, am I. I am Brahma and I am Brahman, etc. And further in one passage: I am the truth, I am the ox, etc, I am the supreme Being. Further therefore, where the intuition or representation of other individual objects, elements etc. begins, is said of them likewise as of the Ultimate, that they are Brahman.

— Hegel, Taschenbuch Wissenschaft Werke 11

The Atharvasiras Upanishad has been an important text in the Pashupata Shaivism tradition and the Nath Yogi movement founded by Gorakhnath. It contains the vow of those who enter monastic life in these traditions.

== Commentary ==
Sharma, Vishwambhar 'Vishu' has written commentary on this Upanishad; Atharvaśira Upaniṣat: With Sanskrit Text.

== See also ==
- Kaivalya Upanishad

== Bibliography ==
- Deussen, Paul (2010). The Philosophy of the Upanishads. Cosimo, Inc. ISBN 978-1-61640-239-6.
- Deussen, Paul; Bedekar, V.M. (tr.); Palsule (tr.), G.B. (1 January 1997). Sixty Upanishads of the Veda. Motilal Banarsidass. ISBN 978-81-208-1467-7.
- Farquhar, John Nicol (1920). An outline of the religious literature of India. H. Milford, Oxford university press. ISBN 81-208-2086-X.
- Hattangadi, Sunder (1999). "अथर्वशिरोपनिषत् (Atharvashiras Upanishad)" (PDF) (in Sanskrit).
- Parmeshwaranand, Swami (2004). Encyclopaedia of the Śaivism. Sarup & Sons. p. 196. ISBN 978-81-7625-427-4.
- Prasoon, Prof. S.K. (1 January 2008). Indian Scriptures. Pustak Mahal. ISBN 978-81-223-1007-8.
- Tinoco, Carlos Alberto (1997). Upanishads. IBRASA. ISBN 978-85-348-0040-2.
- Sharma, Vishwambhar ‘Vishu’ (2020). Atharvaśira Upaniṣat: With Sanskrit Text. Amazon Digital Services LLC - KDP Print US. ISBN 979-867-88-6944-9.
