= Klaus Klostermaier =

German-Canadian scholar on Hinduism and Indian history (1933–2024)

Klaus Konrad Klostermaier
- Born: 14 June 1933; Munich, Germany
- Died: 26 February 2024 (aged 90)
- Education: PhD in philosophy from the Gregorian University in Rome (1961), PhD in Ancient Indian History and Culture from the University of Bombay (1969).
- Known for: Sanskrit and Hindu scholar
- Title: University Distinguished Professor Emeritus

Klaus Konrad Klostermaier (14 June 1933 – 26 February 2024) was a Catholic priest and scholar of Hinduism, Indian history and culture.

== Life and career ==
Klostermaier obtained a PhD in philosophy from the Gregorian University in Rome in 1961, and another in "Ancient Indian History and Culture" from the University of Bombay in 1969.

An ordained Catholic priest, Klostermaier was a missionary and theology teacher for nine years in India in the 1960s. His study of Hindu texts and scholarship, while living with practicing Vaishnava Hindus there, resulted in his Der Hinduismus published in 1965. The expertise he gained then, led to him being appointed advisor to the Papal office, in the Vatican, on non-Christian religions.

He joined the Department of Religion at the University of Manitoba (Canada) in 1970. He received a Rh-Institute Award for "Excellence in the Humanities", of a Templeton Course Award in Science and Religion and an Award for Excellence in Graduate teaching from the University of Manitoba. He was the University Distinguished Professor in the Department of Religious Studies at the University of Manitoba in Canada. He served as the Head of its Center for Religion and Culture from 1986 to 1995.

In 1998, for his scholarship on Hinduism, he was elected as a Fellow of the Royal Society of Canada, and was Head of the Department of Religion at the University of Manitoba (Canada) from 1986 to 1997, and director of an "Asian Studies Center", 1990–1995.

He was the Director of Academic Affairs at the Oxford Centre for Hindu Studies from 1997 to 1998. A Festschrift in his honour was published in 2004. He has spent ten years in India and has researched primary sources in various languages, including Sanskrit, Hindi, Pali, Latin, Classical Greek, German, Italian and French.

Klostermaier died on 26 February 2024, at the age of 90.

== Selected works ==
He is the author of 53 works in seven languages listed at worldCat

- Hinduism: A Beginner's Guide (2008), ISBN 978-1-85168-538-7.
- The Nature of Nature: Explorations in Science, Philosophy and Religion (2004);
- Hindu Writings: A Short Introduction to the Major Sources (2001); ISBN 978-1-85168-230-0.
- A Survey of Hinduism (3rd ed. 2007); ISBN 978-0-7914-7082-4.
- Hinduism: A Short History (2000), ISBN 978-1-85168-213-3.
- Buddhism: A Short Introduction (1999), ISBN 978-1-85168-186-0.
- Indian Theology in Dialogue (1986);
- Mythologies and Philosophies of Salvation in the Theistic Traditions of India (1984), ISBN 978-0-88920-158-3.
- Hindu and Christian in Vrindaban (1969), ISBN 978-0-334-00616-9.
- In the paradise of Krishna; Hindu and Christian seekers, ISBN 978-0-664-24904-5.
- A Concise Encyclopedia of Hinduism, Oneworld, ISBN 978-1-85168-175-4.
- A Short Introduction to Hinduism (1998) ISBN 978-1-85168-163-1.
- Hinduismus.
- Indian Theology in Dialogue.
- Kristvidya: A sketch of an Indian Christology.
- Liberation, salvation, self-realization : A comparative study of Hindu, Buddhist and Christian ideas.
- The Body of God: Cosmos - Avatara - Image.
- Religious Studies: Issues, Prospects, and Proposals with Larry W. Hurtado, ISBN 978-1-55540-623-3.
- Masters of social thought with Ajit Kumar Sinha.
- The Nature of Nature: Explorations in Science, Philosophy, and Religion.
- The wisdom of Hinduism, ISBN 978-1-85168-227-0.
- From end to beginning.
- Hindu-Christian Dialogue.
- Freiheit ohne Gewalt.
- Vedic Aryans and the Origins of Civilization: A Literary and Scientific Perspective with Navaratna Srinivasa Rajaram, David Frawley, ISBN 978-81-85990-36-1.

== Reception ==
In a 1991 review of the 1st edition of Klostermaier's Survey of Hinduism (the book is now in its 3rd edition), Joel Brereton states that the book's "methodological eclecticism and emphasis on indigenous interpretation are reasonable strategies", but Klostermaier in his attempt to bring forward "Hindu voices to explain Hinduism, occasionally offers views that have little currency in modern scholarship". Brereton adds, "the book has a number of unique virtues, includes recent developments in Hinduism, and shows an intimacy with Hindus and the present realities of Hindu life. Best of all, it is grounded in the practice and sights of Hinduism, not just on the great ideas of literary Hinduism" Like Brereton, Knut Jacobsen states that Klostermaier's discussion of the Vedic era is weak and questionable. For instance, Klostermaier considers the Indus Valley civilization as Vedic-Indian, which pushes back the Vedic period by several thousand years beyond the accepted chronology. Jacobsen adds that Klostermaeir's 2nd edition includes examples of Jain and Buddhist influences on Hinduism and the South Asian history, is especially valuable to students and it is "the most thorough introduction to Hinduism as a living religion in English".

Harold Coward describes the 2nd edition of A Survey of Hinduism as "This book offers the most comprehensive, balanced, accessible and yet deeply scholarly presentation of Hinduism in English," and that, "Thomas Hopkins's, The Hindu Religious Tradition, the standard work when it was published some twenty-five years ago, looks rather primitive when compared with Klaus Klostermaier's A Survey of Hinduism, already in second edition by 1994".

George M. Williams has described Klostermaier's Concise Encyclopedia of Hinduism as an "excellent resource by top scholar featuring concise entries." According to Patricia Greer, Klostermaier's encyclopedic articles are useful, but finds Klostermaier's chronology in need of an explanation and one that leaves unresolved "the complexities of an issue that so vexes the field".

In 1998, Klostermaier published his paper 'Questioning the Aryan Invasion Theory and Revisiting Ancient Indian History' in which he pointed out that the source of the Aryan Invasion Theory lay in the belief that the entire world is populated by one of the sons of Noah. Michael Witzel, proponent of the Aryan Invasion Theory, has called him a "recent convert to a Frawleyan view of the world" for questioning the Aryan Invasion Theory. Noting that David Frawley pictures India as the unique cradle of civilization at 10,000 BCE, Witzel expressed dismay that Kostermaier had written an appreciative introduction to one of Frawley books, and included some of Frawleyan views in his own Survey of Hinduism. Such inclusion of unscientific views in college textbooks would have a "detrimental effect", states Witzel.

== See also ==
- List of religion scholars
