= Kayavarohan =

- village
- Location in Gujarat, India Kayavarohan (India)
- Coordinates: 22.067°N 73.2500°E
- Country: India
- State: Gujarat
- District: Vadodara

Languages
  - Official: Gujarati, Hindi
- Time zone: UTC+5:30 (IST)
- Vehicle registration: GJ-06
- Website: gujaratindia.com

Kayavarohan or Karvan is a village in the Vadodara district of the state of Gujarat, India. Kayavarohan is popularly known as Karvan. It is 11 km from the National Highway 48 and 30 km from Vadodara. Kayavarohan is considered as the birthplace of Lakulisha, the second century C.E. Shaivite revivalist, reformer and propounder of the pashupata doctrine. It is an important religious place on account of its Lakulisha temple.

== History ==
Kayavarohan (Karvan) is an ancient town believed to have existed through each of the Four Ages. As per Shaivite mythology, Shiva in the Lakulish manifestation appeared at this settlement. According to mythology and puranas, from here Shiva transmigrated into the form of a Brahmin child. The name Kayavarohan is derived from kaya (body) and avarohan (descent), referring to the belief in the descent of Shiva at the site.

Several copper coins and a stone quern have been found at the site. Other finds include the head of Tapas, an image of Kartikeya, and an idol of Uma Maheshwara; these artefacts are preserved locally in a museum.

== Religious Significance ==
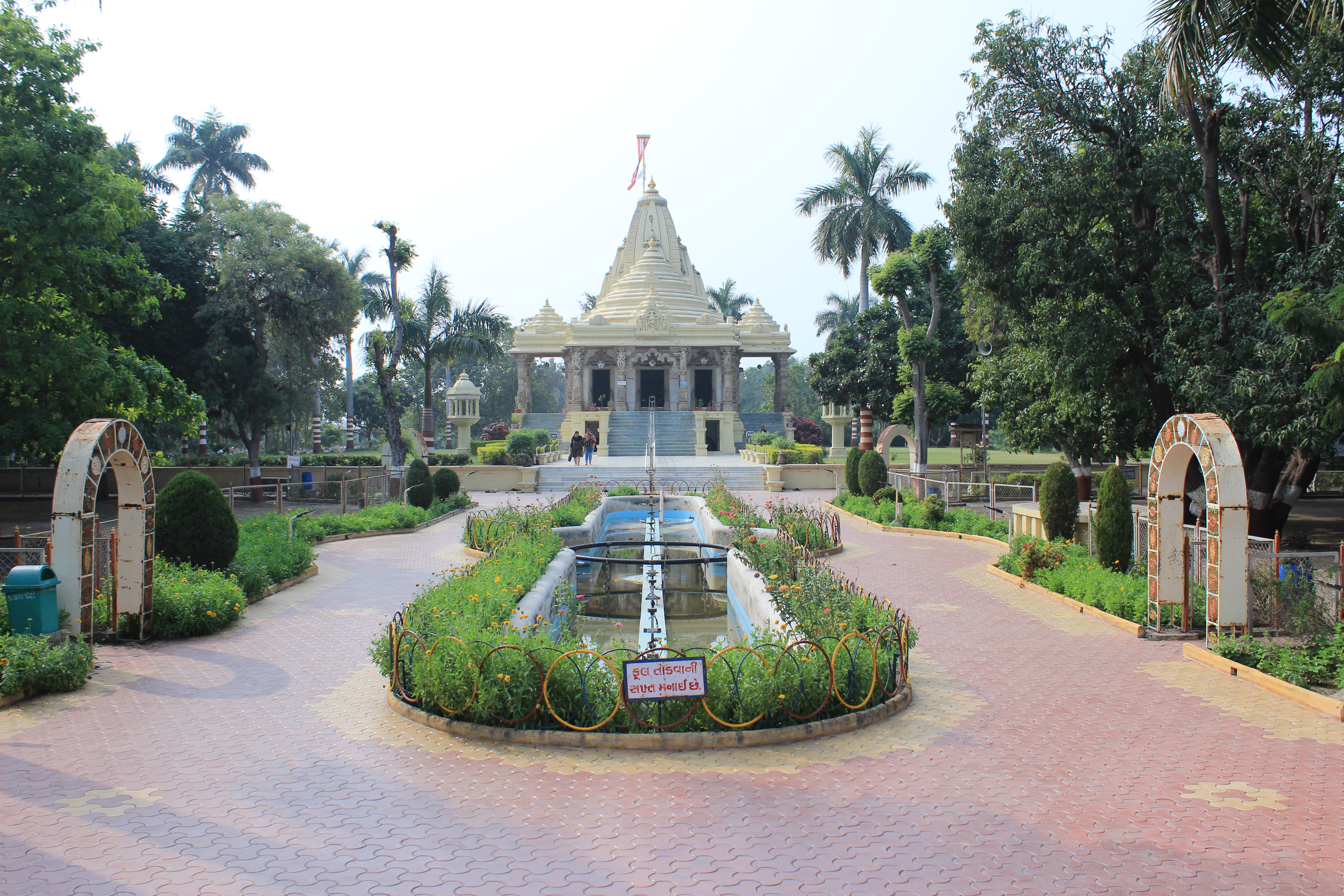
The Kayavarohan temple

Kayavarohan is one of the sixty-eight teerthas (pilgrimage sites) of Shiva described in the Shiva Purana. However, it is not among the 12 Jyotirlingas as mentioned in the Shiva Purana.

It is of particular significance to the Pasupatas (followers of the Pashupati), those in the spiritual following of Lakulish, for it is considered to be the place of Shiva's appearance on earth in that incarnation. Lakulish is considered to be the 28th birth of Shiva. Shiva had come to the earth in the form of Lakulisha through Kayavarohan, literally meaning ‘Descent of the form’.

Kayavarohan harbours the Brahmeshwar Jyotirshivlang temple, claimed to have been founded by Maharshi Vishwamitra. It has been held that the incarnation of Shiva in Lakulish has merged with the linga in Shambhavi Mudra.

Shiva is the deity who constructs and destroys the universe for ultimately good reasons. His ascetic appearance and life strongly relate to his constant meditative endeavors for the betterment of the entire universe. Above all, Shambhavi Mudra is his signature meditation style.

The Kayavarohan lingam is a representation of Shiva depicting him as a meditating yogi, holding parchments in one hand and citron (matulinga) in the other.

It is believed the main place of pilgrimage was Ichhapuri in Satya Yuga, Mayapuri in Treta Yuga, Meghavati in Dvapara Yuga, and Kayavarohan in the present Kali Yuga. This temple has a Lingam of Shiva, made up of black stone. It is believed that Maharshi Vishwamitra had installed this Linga of Shiva during the Ramayana period.

In the Vedic times, Kayavarohan/Karvan was a popular centre of learning and education and used to house numerous Vedic Universities, Yajna Shalas and the temples of many Hindu Gods.

The myth has it that during the barbarian invasion of Mahmood of Ghazni, the luminous jyotirlinga with Lakulish merged the light of all of the other 12 jyotirlingas into its form and disappeared.

Presently, there is an underground meditation cave at the Kayavarohana temple used for seclusion and meditation.

There is a Swaminarayan Hindu temple built by Haricharandas Swami in Vikram Samvat 1971 which falls under the Vadtal Gadi. It is located by Kayavarohan Tower near Gam panchayat.

Maha Shivratri is most famous festival in Kayavarohan. During the sacred day, hundreds of men wear Lord Mahadev's attire and appear at the temples.

== Archaeological Significance ==
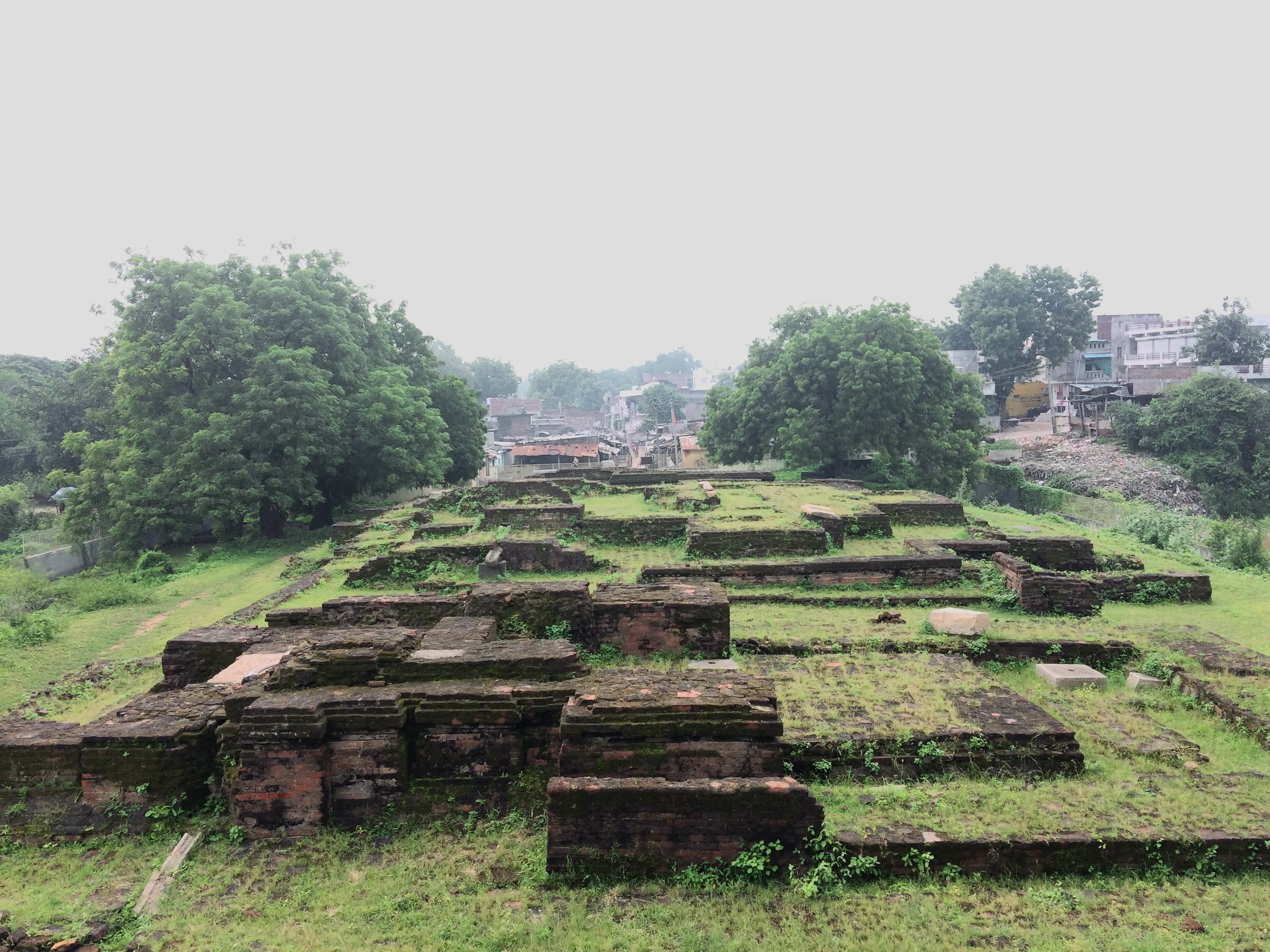
Ancient site (Excavated) at Kayavarohan

The village and its surrounding areas are of great archaeological significance. Ancient sculptures and relics belonging to the second century have been excavated from this place.

The Shiva temples at Karvan are said to have been destroyed during invasions of 11th-17th century. However, the Shiva Lingas of the destroyed temples survived and remained at the site.

The temple of Lakulish and temples of Karvan were rebuilt and restored during the late twentieth century by the Hindu spiritual leader Kripalvanand.

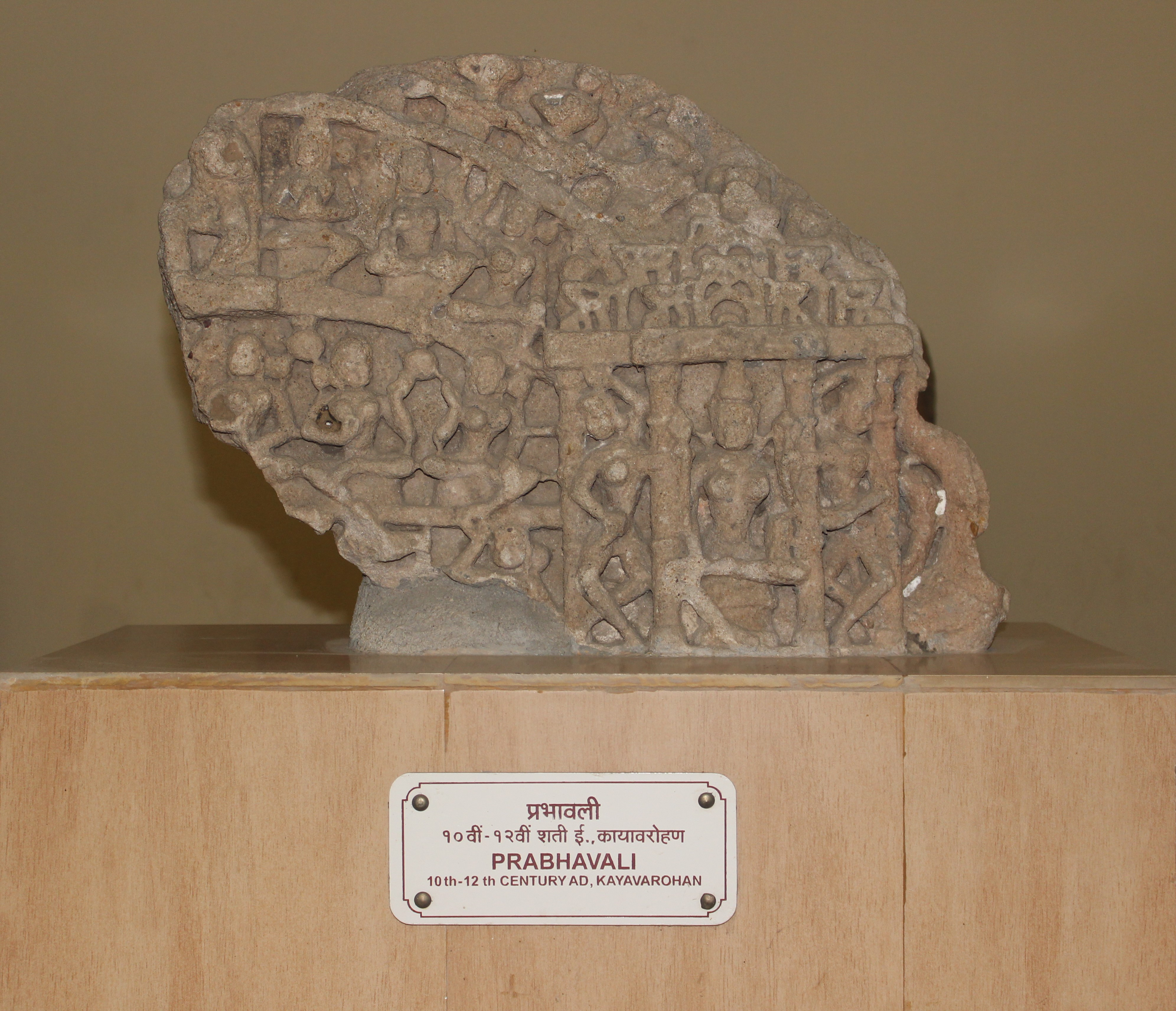
Prabhavali, dated 10-12th century, found from Kayavarohan. Now in Archaeological Museum of Kayavarohan.

Numerous Hindu icons, number of copper coins and a stone quern have been found from Kayavarohan. A grand head of Tapasvi, the image of Kartikeya and an idol of Uma Maheshwara are some of the rare and unmatched archaeological specimen discovered from Kayavarohan. Kayavarohan is a place of great archaeological importance and the A.S.I. Archaeological Survey of India has listed Karvan as a heritage site and has set up a special museum for the remains found around this site. Karvan is one of the major sites of Indian Heritage.

== See also ==
- Karvan
- Kayavarohan
- The Karvan temple
- Wikimapia Location
