= Astamurti =

Eight manifestations of Hindu deity Shiva

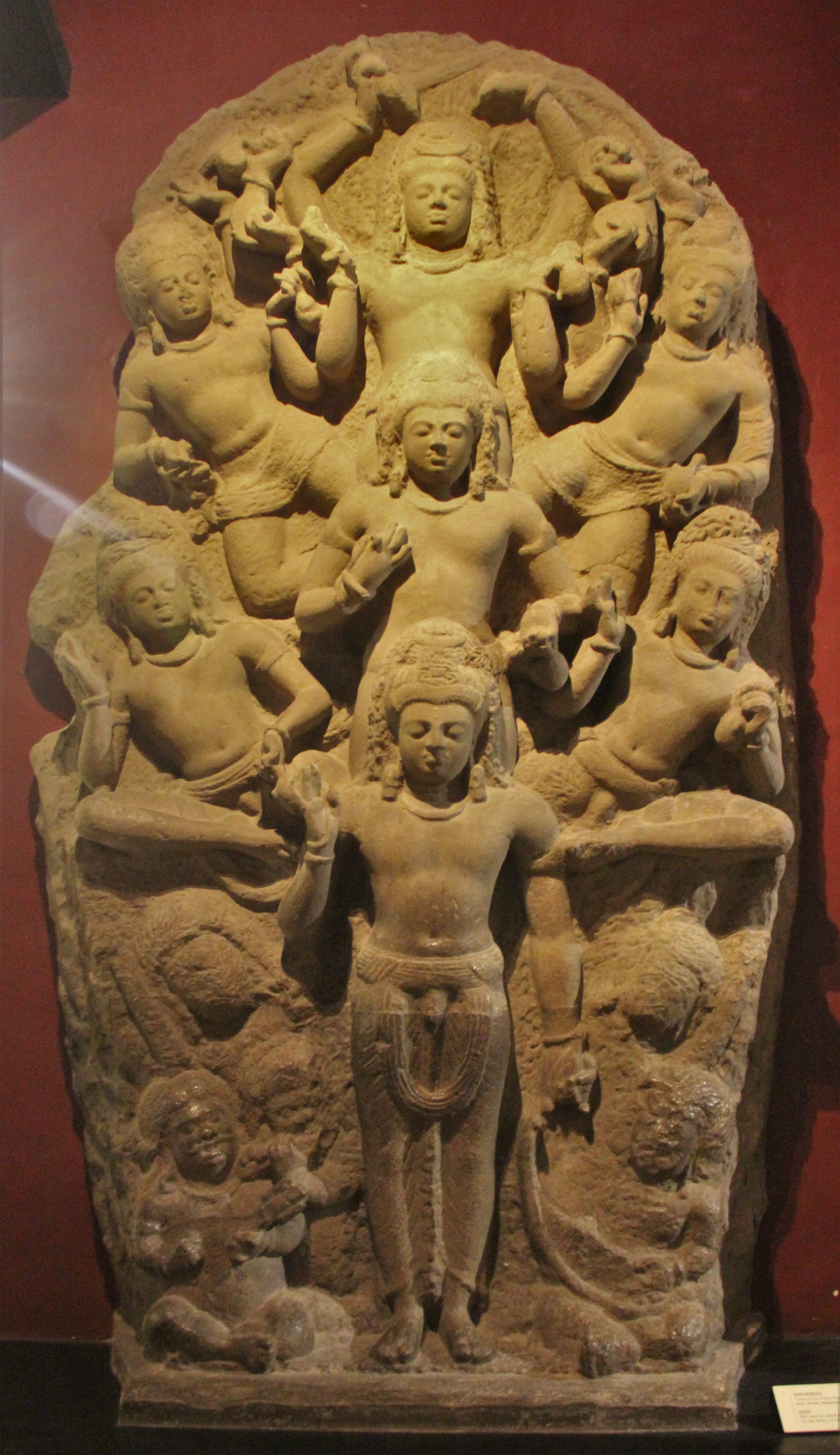
Plaster replica of the Ashtamurti form of Shiva, 6th century CE. On display in the Prince of Wales Museum, Mumbai.

Ashtamurti (Sanskrit: अष्टमूर्ति, romanized: Aṣṭamūrti, lit. 'eight forms') refers to the iconographic representation of the eight attributes of the Hindu deity Shiva. These are Rudra, Śarva, Paśupati, Ugra, Aśani, Bhava, Mahādeva, and Īśāna.

== Literature ==
In the Vedas, the deity Rudra, who was subsequently assimilated with Shiva, has multiple attributes and numerous titles, among which eight are significant to the conceptualization in the Shaiva tradition. Rudra's identification with Shiva was put in writing for the first time in Shvetashvatara Upanishad and later in Yajurveda linked Taittiriya Samhita (S.4.5.1), in the Shata Rudriya section. The Vajasneya samhita (S. 3.63) also co-equals Shiva with Rudra by citing the mantra, “tam Shiva namasi”, meaning “I bow to you, Shiva”. The Shathapatha Brahmana notes that Shiva is also called referred to as Bhava, Mahadeva, Sharva, Pashupati, Ugra and Ishana. These are typically the forms of water, fire, sacrifice, sun, moon, ether, earth, and air. Ancient Sanskrit linguist and grammarian Pāṇini in his Astadhyayi (S.1.49, S.3.53, S.4.100, S.5.3.99) also notes that Rudra is called variously as Mrida, Bhava, Sharva, Grisha, Mahadeva, and Tryambaka. Rishi Patanjali, propounder of Yoga system, in Mahabashya also provides for various icons of Shiva. In the Puranic era, Rudra completely merged with Shiva and joined the Trimurti (the merged form of Brahma, Vishnu, and Shiva) and represented the destroyer of evil.

=== Brahmanas ===
The concept of Ashtamurti is seen in the Kaushitaki Brahmana of the Rigveda (6.1):

yad bhava āpas tena। yat śarvo agnis tena। yat paśu patir vāyus tena। yad ugro deva oṣadhayo vanaspatayas tena। yan mahān deva ādityas tena। yad rudraś candramās tena। yad īśāno annam tena। yad aśanir indras tena।
Bhava is Water. Sharva is Fire. Pashupati is Air. Ugra Deva is plants and medicines. Mahadeva is Sun. Rudra is Moon. Ishana is Food. Ashani is Indra.

Thus, as per this text, water, fire, air, Medicines, the sun, the moon, food, and Indra are the eight forms of Shiva.Later Shaiva philosophies, namely, the Shaiva Siddhanta (Shaiva doctrine) and the Pashupati Mata (Pashupati doctrine), stream recognise the Ashtamurti iconography in the Agamas. However, these texts put greater emphasis on the Panchabrahman attribute in comparison to the Vedic Ashtamurti ascription.

=== Shiva Mahimna Stotram ===
The Puranic Shiva Mahimna Stotram, dedicated to Shiva, and attributed to Gandharva Pushpadanta, invokes the Ashtamurti form, and distinctly enumerates the eight names of Shiva in stanza 28:

bhavaḥ śarvo rudraḥ paśupatirathograḥ sahamahān
tathā bhīmeśānāviti yadabhidhānāṣṭakamidam |
amuṣmin pratyekaṁ pravicarati deva śrutirapi
priyāyāsmaidhāmne praṇihita-namasyo'smi bhavate || 28 ||

"Bhava, Sharva, Rudra, Pashupati, also Ugra with Mahan, furthermore Bhima and Ishana, these are eight appellations of the Lord, each of them the srutis individually expound. My salutations are to the dear abode in which these names are laid i.e. to one who bears these names."

=== Bhagavata Purana ===
The Bhagavata Purana (S. 3.12.12) mentions the following names of Shiva:

- Manyur manur mahinaso
- Mahāñ chiva rtadhvajah
- Ugra-retā bhavah kālo
- Vāmadevo dhrtavratah

The Bhagavata Purana states that Brahma gave Rudra eleven other names; Manyu, Manu, Mahinasa, Mahān, Śiva, Rtadhvaja, Ugraretā, Bhava, Kāla, Vāmadeva, and Dhrtavrata. Many names from the Bhagavata Purana appear in the Ashtamurti ascription.

== See also ==
- Ashtalakshmi
- Navadurga
- Panchamukha
