= Pancabrahma Upanishad =

Minor Upanishad of Hinduism

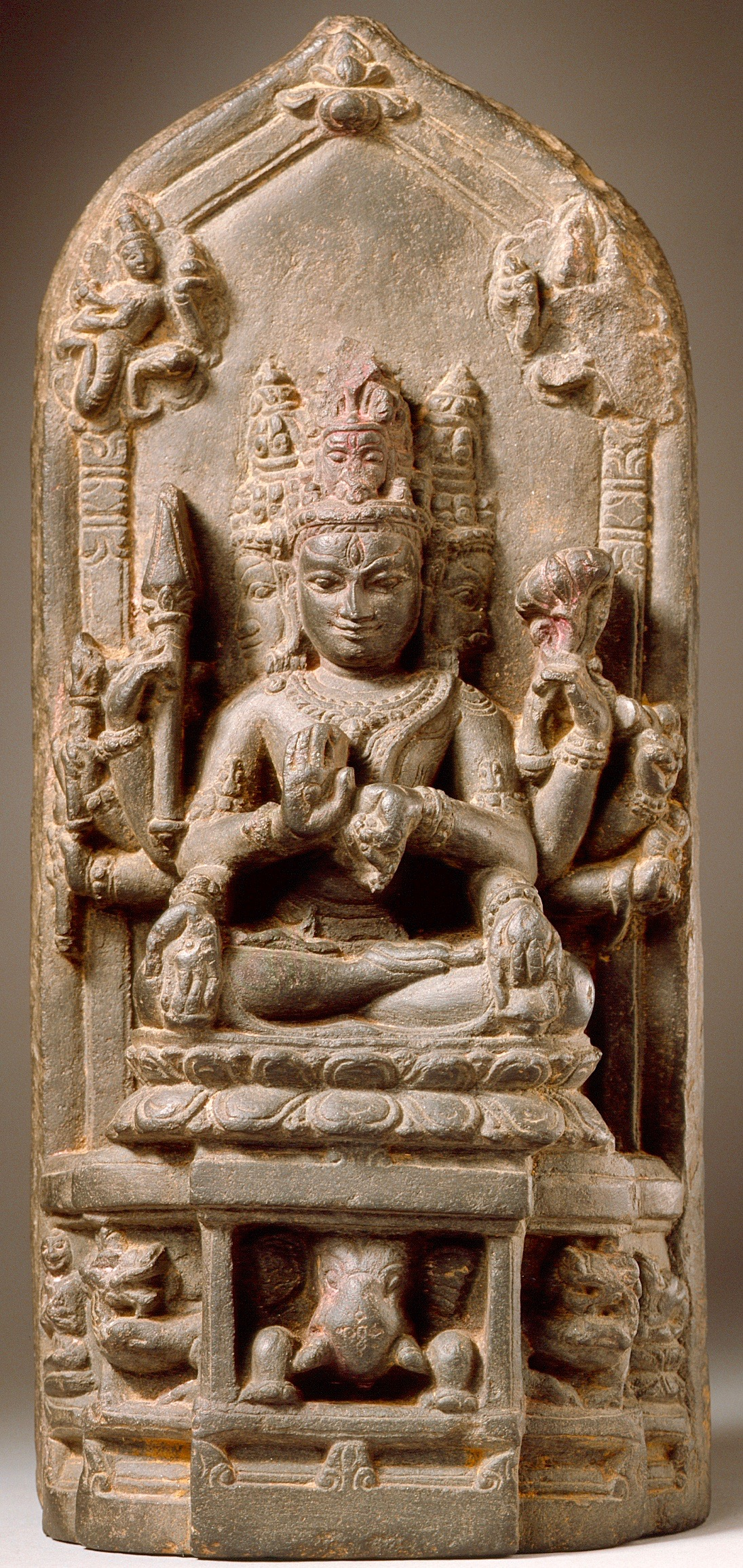
- The text glorifies five faced Shiva
- Devanagari: पञ्चब्रह्म
- IAST: Pañca-brahma
- Title means: Five Realities
- Date: before ~7th-century CE
- Type: Shaiva
- Linked Veda: Krishna Yajurveda
- Chapters: 1
- Verses: 36
- Philosophy: Shaivism, Vedanta

The Pancabrahma Upanishad (Sanskrit: पञ्च ब्रह्म उपनिषत्, IAST: Pañca-brahma Upaniṣad) is a medieval era Sanskrit text and is one of the minor Upanishads of Hinduism. The text is classified as one of 14 Shaiva Upanishads, and one of the 32 Upanishads of the Krishna Yajurveda.

The Upanishad glorifies Shiva, with Vedanta nondualism terminology. The text is notable for its focus on Sadashiva, as Brahman, with his five faces corresponding to five Ishwaras, and for its recommendation of meditation on "So'ham" or "I am he, He am I" to achieve moksha, the union with Brahman.

== History ==
The date or author of Pancabrahma Upanishad is unknown. Kramrisch states that this is a late text, but possibly one which was composed before the Vishnudharmottara Purana. She dates the latter to about 7th-century CE, contemporary with Ajanta Caves paintings.

Manuscripts of this text are also found titled as Panchabrahma Upanishad and Pancabrahmopanishad. In the Telugu language anthology of 108 Upanishads of the Muktika canon, narrated by Rama to Hanuman, it is listed at number 93 as Pancabrahma Upanishad. This text is not a part of the 17th century compilation of 50 important Hindu Upanishads published by Mughal Era Dara Shikoh and of the 18th-century anthology of 52 Upanishads published by Colebrooke, nor is it found in the Bibliotheca Indica anthology by Narayana.

As an Upanishad, it is a part of the corpus of Vedanta literature collection that present the philosophical concepts of Hinduism.

== Contents ==
The text opens with sage Paippalāda asking Shiva, "what is that which came to exist first?" Shiva's reply is structured as the verses of Pancabrahma Upanishad.

The Pancabrahma Upanishad describes five forms of reality (Brahman) or Shiva that arose from highest reality – Sadyojata, Aghora, Vamadeva, Tatpurusha and Ishana. He is panchatmak, who conceals all five Brahmas, and to realize him is moksha. The Ishana, asserts the text, is the highest form of Brahman, unmanifested impeller, adorned with Om, and that all five Brahmas resolve into the supreme Nirguna (formless) Brahman. The supreme shines by its own light, beyond the five Brahmas, states this Pancabrahma text.

Shiva is within all beings

In the Brahmapura (the city of Brahma, the body), wherein is the abode of the form of a white lotus (the heart), known as the Dahara, in the middle of it is the ether known as Daharakasha. That ether is Shiva, the infinite existence, nondual consciousness and unsurpassed bliss...

This Shiva is the witness established in the heart of all beings...

— Panchabrahma Upanishad 40–41,

The text asserts that Sadyojata represents earth and is associated with Kriya Sakti (power of action). The Aghora represents fire and drives the Iccha Sakti (power of will, desire) and Vamadeva represents water and impels the Jnana Sakti (power of knowledge). Tatpurusha represents air and is the power of life (breath, prana), while Ishana represents ether-space and the transcendental.

Teun Goudriaan, a professor in the Department of Oriental Studies and author, states that the Pancabrahma Upanishad focuses on these symbolism behind the five faces of Shiva and mystical equations about all except Ishana face. The Ishana face of Shiva is glorified with general epithets such as "superior to the pacified", as "Brahman", as "Supreme", as "lustre behind everything", and as "I myself am that Brahman", thus emphasizing his fundamental position in this text. The verse 23 of the manuscript asserts that one must meditate on Shiva within, with "So'ham" or "I am He, He am I" to achieve moksha, the union with Brahman. This outlook of this text corresponds to Advaita Vedanta position of Hindu philosophy, states Goudriaan.

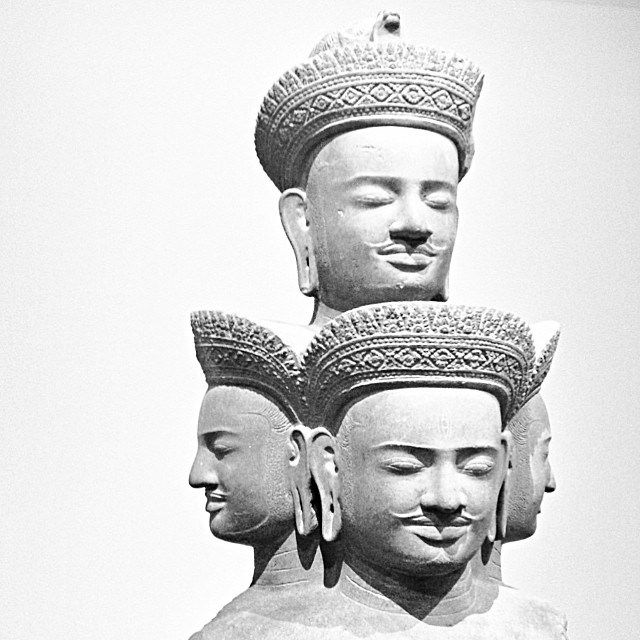
Five-faced Shiva from 10th century Cambodia. The Ishana face is at the top.

This Upanishad, states Kramrisch, gives precedence to the "power of knowledge", in contrast with some Shaiva text such as Vatulasuddh-agama which emphasize "power of will". According to Kramrisch, this may be either doctrinal differences or possible errors in transmission of the manuscripts over the centuries, but the components of Shavism ontology are consistent across the texts, since the latter part of the 1st-millennium CE. The text, adds Kramrisch, asserts that "all this phenomenal world is the Parabrahman, Shiva, of the character of the fivefold Brahmans", and that everything in a being's inner and outer senses, that falls within or lies beyond, is Shiva of fivefold Brahman character.

The seeker realizes that aspect of five Brahman Shiva, in accord with the strength of his vision, his spiritual development, and it is Shiva who is in the heart of all beings, Shiva is Sat-Cit-Ananda, meaning existence, consciousness, and Bliss. Shiva is the liberator, asserts the text.

== Reception ==
The pancabrahma concept found in this Upanishad is also found in the Śaivā Agamas, described in a similar way.

== See also ==
- Atharvashiras Upanishad
- Kaivalya Upanishad
- Narayana Upanishad
- Tripura Upanishad
