= 64 swayambhuwa lingas =

The 64 Swayambhuwa Lingas (Catuḥṣaṣṭi Liṅga) are a group of sacred self-manifested shivalingas in Bagmati Province, Nepal. These sacred lingas are distributed over different regions of Kathmandu, Bhaktapur, Lalitpur, Nuwakot, Sindhuli, Sindhupalanchowk, Kavrepalanchowk and Makwanpur districts. These sacred lingas are mentioned in Himwatkhanda of Skandapurana.

== Himwatkhanda and other related old texts ==
Himwatkhanda is one of the different Khandas (parts) of Skandapurana. It primarily describes the Himalayan region of Nepal and its sacred places, rivers, mountains and forests along with Saiva traditions and legends. The Himavatkhanda provides a detailed account of the 64 Swayambhu Liṅgas of Nepal, including their origins and related Puranic history.

"Chatusasthi Linga Yatra Mahatmya" is another rare old sanskrit manuscript which highlights the pilgrimage of 64 lingas. The original material is present in Nepal, and the digital copy of folio can be read online from "Endangered Archives Programme".

== List of 64 Swayambhuwa Lingas ==
1. Kusheswar Mahadev, Dumja Sindhuli
2. Bhimeswar Mahadev, Dolakha
3. Kafiswar Mahadev, Sindhupalchowk
4. Kashyapeswar Mahadev, Kavrepalanchowk
5. Sfatikeswar Mahadev, Sindhupalanchowk
6. Chandeswar Mahadev, Banepa
7. Dhaneswar Mahadev, Banepa, Kavrepalanchowk
8. Vikateswar Mahadev, Kavrepalanchowk
9. Indreswar Mahadev, Kavrepalanchowk
10. Bhaleswar Mahadev, Kavrepalanchowk
11. Gupteswar Mahadev, Lalitpur
12. Tileswar Mahadev, Lele
13. Champakeswar Mahadev, Lele
14. Rameswar Mahadev, lalitpur
15. Kaleswar Mahadev, Lalitpur
16. Natarambheswar Mahadev, Makwanpur
17. Uddalakeswar Mahadev, Kathmandu
18. Gopaleswar Mahadev, Kathmandu
19. Champeswar Mahadev, Makwanpur
20. Unmatteswar Mahadev, Makwanpur
21. Nandikeswar Mahadev, Makwanpur
22. Gokhureswar Mahadev, Makwanpur
23. Pandukeswar Mahadev, Makwanpur
24. Kuteswar Mahadev, Makwanpur
25. Ashiteshwar Mahadev, Dhading
26. Bhairavesar Mahadev, Devighat, Nuwakot
27. Bramheswar Mahadev, Kabilas, Nuwakot
28. Kartikeswar (Skandeswar) Mahadev, Satari, Nuwakot
29. Shatarudreswar Mahadev, Shivapuri, Kathmandu
30. Kakeswar Mahadev, Kathmandu
31. Manichudeswar Mahadev, Kathmandu
32. Yogeswar Mahadev, Kathmandu
33. Narayaneswar Mahadev, Kathmandu
34. Jyotirlingeswar Mahadev, Sankhu, Kathmandu
35. Ratnachudeswar Mahadev, Nagarkot, Bhaktapur
36. Vagiswar Mahadev, Bhaktapur
37. Kileswar Mahadev, Bhaktapu
38. Balmikiswar Mahadev, Bhaktapur
39. Nangleswar Mahadev, Bhaktapur
40. Vinaleswar Mahadev, Bhaktapur
41. Anantalingeswar Mahadev, Gundu, Bhaktapur
42. Vishwarupeswar Mahadev, Bhaktapur
43. Someswar Mahadev, Bhaktapur
44. Gomarateswar Mahadev, Lalitpur
45. Bhringeswar Mahadev, Lalitpur
46. Trilingeswar Mahadev, Lalitpur
47. Kupiteswar Mahadev, Lalitpur
48. Sarveswar Mahadev, Lalitpur
49. Golokeswar Mahadev, Kathmandu
50. Chandananarateswar Mahadev, Kathmandu
51. Yakshyeswar Mahadev, kathmandu
52. Chandikeswar Mahadev, Tokha Kathmandu
53. Dhaneswar Mahadev, kathmandu
54. Gokarneswar Mahadev, Kathmandu
55. Koitswar Mahadev, Kathmandu
56. Vaneswar Mahadev, Kathmandu
57. Gyaneswar Mahadev, Kathmandu
58. Parwateswar Mahadev, Kathmandu
59. Jaleswar Mahadev, Kathmandu
60. Guhyeswar Mahadev, Kathmandu
61. Kirateswar Mahadev, Kathmandu
62. Bhasmeswar Mahadev, Kathmandu
63. Bhuwaneswar Mahadev, Kathmandu
64. Rudragareswar Mahadev, Kathmandu

== Legend of Ne muni and Virupakshya ==
Ne Muni was a great ascetic sage who resided in the Himalayan region of the present day Nepal. He is believed to have protected, guided and spiritually governed the land. Nepal derives its name from Ne muni ("Ne" the sage + "pala" protected land; “The land protected by Ne Muni”).

Virupakshya and Ne Muni visited all 64 swayambuwa lingas and discussed their importance.

== Padyatras (Pilgrimage journey by foot) ==
In March 2026, a large-scale pilgrimage called the “Brihat Pashupat Parikrama” was organized in Nepal to highlight the spiritual importance of Lord Pashupatinath, the Pashupat region, and the 64 swayambhuwa lingas, while also seeking forgiveness for the river’s pollution and promoting spiritual awakening among people. Initiated by Swami Ramanananda Giri, the journey will begin with rituals at Pashupatinath and proceed as a 35–36 day foot pilgrimage covering multiple regions of Kathmandu, Bhaktapur, Lalitpur, Sindhupalanchowk, Kavrepalanchowk, Dolakha, Sindhuli, Nuwakot, and others, with the aim of visiting the 64 Swayambuwa Lingas. The initiative also emphasizes research, public awareness, and cultural revival, encouraging participation from devotees, scholars, and institutions, while reinforcing Nepal’s identity as the sacred land of Pashupatinath and the center of Pashupat civilization.
