= Lakulisha =

Hindu deity

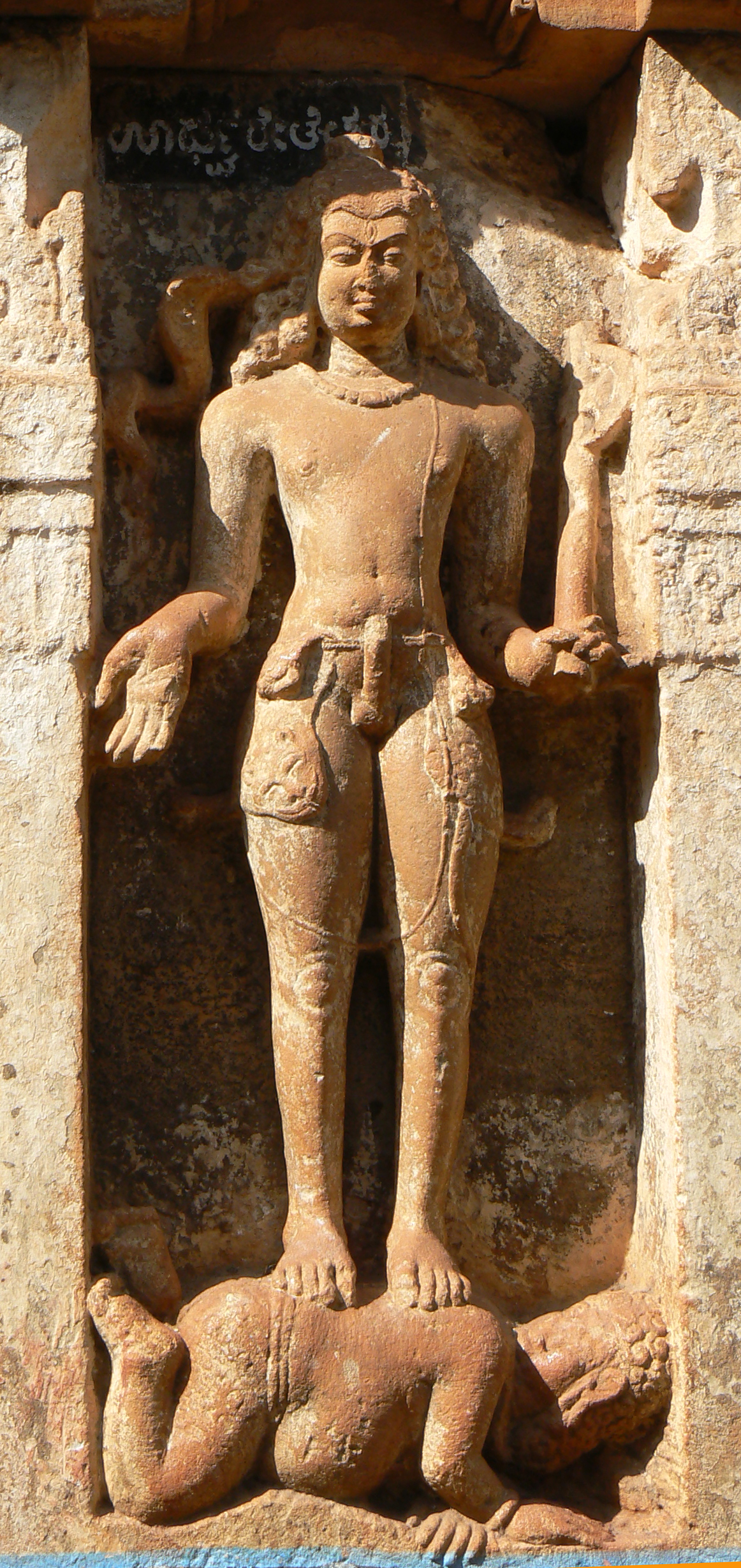
Lakulisha at Sangameshvara Temple at Mahakuta, Karnataka (Chalukya, 7th century CE). His 5th–10th century ithyphallic statues (Note: The ithyphallic representation of the erect shape connotes the very opposite in this context. It contextualize "seminal retention" or practice of celibacy (illustration of Urdhva Retas), and represents Lakulisha as "he stands for complete complete control of the senses, and for the supreme carnal renunciation".) are also found in seated yogi position in Rajasthan, Uttar Pradesh and elsewhere.

Lakulisha (Sanskrit: लकुलीश IAST: Lakulīśa) (Etymology: लगुड (staff) or लकुट (mace) + ईश (lord) = meaning, the lord with a staff or mace or club or stick) was a prominent Shaivite revivalist, reformist and preceptor of the doctrine of the Pashupatas, one of the oldest sects of Shaivism.

According to some scholars, Lakulisha was the founder of the Pashupata sect. Others argue that the Pashupata doctrine was already in existence before Lakulisha, and he was only its first formal preceptor.

According to a tradition stated in the Linga Purana, Lakulisha is considered as the 28th and the last avatar of Shiva and the propounder of the Yoga system. In this tradition, Lakulisha had four disciples: Kaurushya, Garga, Mitra and Kushika. According to another tradition mentioned in the Avanti Khanda of the Skanda Purana, Lakulisha and his four disciples installed a linga at Mahakalavana, which was then known as Kayavarohaneshvara. The Kurma Purana (Chapter 53), the Vayu Purana (Chapter 23), and the Linga Purana (Chapter 24) predicted that Shiva (Maheshvara) would appear in the form of a wandering monk called 'Lakulin' or 'Nakulisha', and that he would have four disciples named Kushika, Garga, Mitra, and Kanrushya, who would re-establish the cult of Pashupati and would therefore be called Pashupata(s). Lakulisha was the fruition of these divine predictions. According to Vayu Purana V. 1.23.202-214, Lakulisha was a contemporary of Vyasa and Krishna, and was the 28th incarnation of Rudra (Shiva).

== Life ==
Lakulisha was born in the village of Karavan on the bank of Narmada in Gujarat and propagated Saivism. It has been maintained that Lakulisha's thesis conflicted with that of Gosala, and Lakulisha opposed Jainism and particularly Buddhism. Lakulisha is said to have restored practices of Hatha yoga and Tantrism, as well as the cosmological theories of the Samkhya and the duality associated with Samkhya tenets.

== Historicity ==
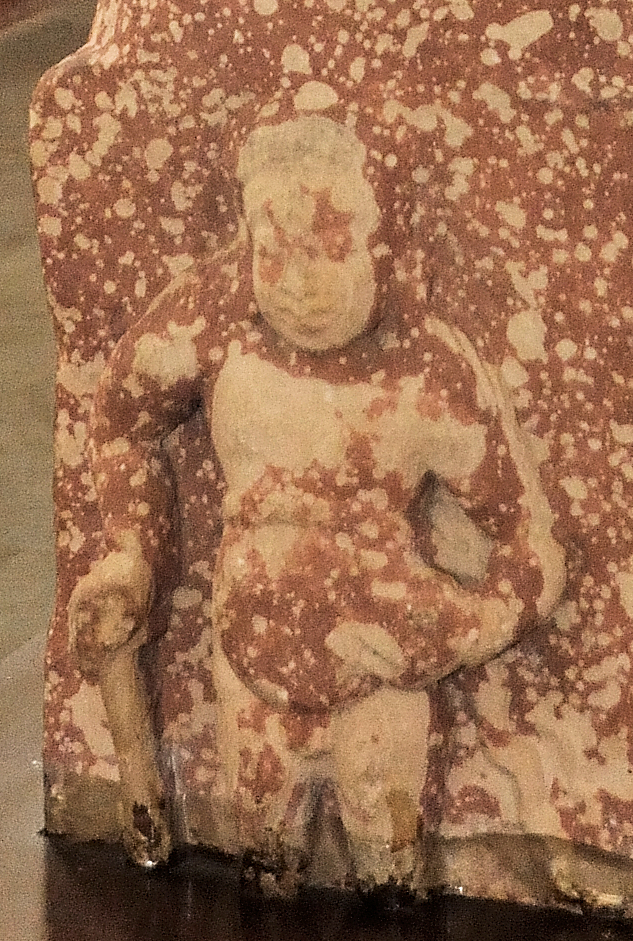
Early Gupta relief on the Lakulisa pillar, inscribed Gupta era "year 61", 380 CE.

A pillar erected by Chandragupta II at Mathura in 380 CE states that a ‘Guruvayatana’ (Abode of the Gurus) was established by Uditacharya, who was 4th in descent from a teacher of the Pashupata sect named Parashara, who in turn was 6th in descent from Kushika. If this Kushika is one of the four disciples of Lakulisha described in the Linga Purana, the latter must have existed around 125 CE.

The epigraphist John Faithfull Fleet contends that in North India, Kushana emperors like Huvishka (140 CE) replaced the pictures of Hercules on their coins with ones of Shiva, and of Heracles with images of Lakulisha.

In the 4th century CE, beginning with the reign of Chandragupta II, icons and representations of Lakulisha have been frequently found. They portray him as a naked yogi with a staff in his left hand and a citron (matulinga) in his right, either standing or seated in the lotus posture. At about the beginning of the 11th century, the Lakulisha cult shifted its activities to southern India.

A sect of Pasupata ascetics, founded by Lakulisa (or Nahulisa), is attested by inscriptions from the 5th century and is among the earliest of the sectarian religious orders of Shaivite Hinduism.

== Sculpture context ==
The penile erection representation illustrates the centrality of the energetic principle of Urdhva Retas (Sanskrit: ऊर्ध्वरेतस् IAST: Ūrdhvaretas, lit. "ascent of vital energies or fluid") practice of Brahmacharya or celibacy and the upward flow of energy in spiritual pursuits, contrary to fertility or release of vital energies. Controlling the vital fluid, the seminal fluid, is thought to retain control of all passions and the achievement of desirelessness through the practice of Asceticism and Yogic Sadhana, leading to supreme mystical cognition or samādhi. Lakulisha stands on top of an Apasmara (demon dwarf), who symbolizes spiritual ignorance, greed, sensual desires or Kama and nonsensical speech on the spiritual path, hence must be subdued in spiritual pursuits.

The Urdhva linga (IAST: ūrdhvaliṅga), pointing upward, conveys not only the retention of the seed once "stirred" but its upward condition, "through the spinal cord to the brain", retaining its integrity as 'creative substance', while being transformed and absorbed mentally as Bodhicitta, the "thought of Awakening". The symbol of the ascent and transmutation of vital (sexual) energy into mental power, a channeling of the procreative into creative faculty, is artistically seen as tantric realization in Mukhalinga or "face-linga", the two overlapping components forming a visual unity, according to Stella Kramrisch. (Note: Furthermore, the phallic shape, standing erect, always negates its function as an organ of procreation. Rather, the shape or pictorial representation is conveying that, the seed was channeled upward, not ejected for the sake of generation, but was reversed, retained and absorbed for regeneration as creative energy.)

In Kramrisch's view, the pictorial rendering of the ascent of the vital energy should not be mistaken for fertility or sexuality. Lakulisa, who is an ascetic manifestation of Shiva, is seen in later peninsular Indian scriptures, whose ithyphallic aspects connotes asceticism and conserved procreative potentialities (Brahmacharya), rather than mere eroticism. The ithyphallic representation of the erect shape connotes the very opposite in this context, as it stands for "seminal retention", and represents Lakulisha as "he stands for the complete control of the senses, and for the supreme carnal renunciation". In the path of Brahmacharya, Asceticism or Sannyasa, the yogi does not deny sexual urges, but transforms sexual energy and directs it away from procreation and pleasure towards intuited wisdom, freedom and bliss.

== Influence on philosophy and religion ==
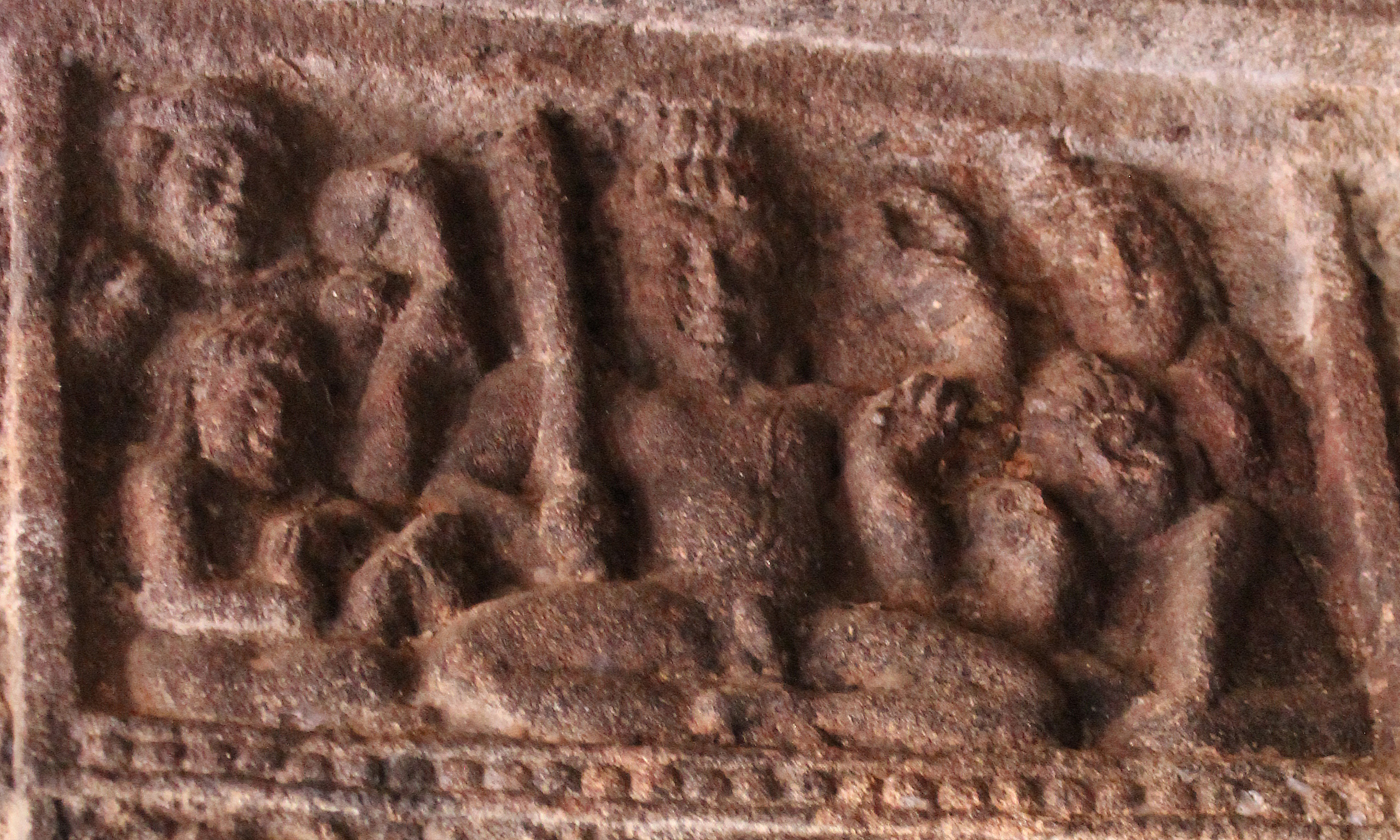
Lakulisha among his four disciples Kusika, Garga, Mitra, and Kaurushya, rock-cut stone relief, Cave Temple No. 2 at Badami, Karnataka, Early Chalukya dynasty, second half of the 6th century CE

M. R. Sakhare argues in The History and Philosophy of Lingayat Religion that the influence of Lakulisha was immense and spread rapidly, first in the north and then in the south of India. The Shaivite revival, supported by the Bharashiva Nagas of Mathura and Vakataka dynasty in central and northern India, gradually spread in the south under the impetus of artisan class Shaiva mystics, the Nayanars.

== Teachings ==
Lakulisha Pashupata has been identified with the Bhedābheda tradition, which combines dualistic and non-dualistic monism, and his teachings had a strong emphasis on the yoga system. The principal text of the Pashupata sect, the Pāśupata Sūtra, is attributed to Lakulisha. The manuscripts of this text and a commentary on it, the Pañcārtha Bhāṣya by Kaundinya (c. 500 CE), were discovered in 1930. The Pāśupata Sūtra formalizes various canons of the Pashupata sect, and contains the basic theology of the sect. However, the authorship of Lakulisha over the Pashupata sutras have been a subject of debate. The Pashupata sutras are of an archaic character and do not bear the name of any author. Though certain traditions mention Lakulisha as the author, there is nothing to support this in the form of internal written evidence from the Sutras. Even, Kaundinya’s commentary only states:

" ... Tatha shishta pramanyat kamitvad ajatatvach cha, Manushya-rupi bhagavan brahmana-kayam asthaya kayavatarane avatirna iti | Tatha padbhyam ujjayinim praptah.."

("Shiva incarnated in the form of a human being by entering the body of a deceased Brahmana in the [village of] Kayavatara, thereafter wandered to Ujjain.")

This account matches those narrated in the Puranas and the Karvana Mahatmya, where Lakulisha incarnates in Kayavarohana (Karvan) village. However, unlike the latter accounts, the name Lakulisha is never mentioned, even though in the subsequent lines Kaundinya mentions that Shiva as the Brahmana imparted Shastra to the student Kushika. Only in the subsequent Pashupata texts, Ratna Tika and Gana Karika, does a clear mention of Lakulisha as the founder of the Pashupata system appear. This raises questions regarding Lakulisha being the actual composer of the sutras.

Notwithstanding the authorship of the sutras, the philosophical doctrine of the Pashupata(s) as enunciated by Lakulisha are called "Ishvara Kartri Vadaha (the creative power of the sovereign being)", which was first found to be quoted later by Adi Shankaracharya in commentary on the Brahma Sutras (3.2.37). An analysis of it is found in one of the main Pashupata texts, the Gana Karika of Haradatta, and its commentary by Kaundinya called Panchartha Bhashya (commentary of the five subjects). Ramanuja attributed this philosophy to the tradition of the Kalamukha(s), the sect of "Black Faces" to which Lakulisha belonged. This Nakulisha Pashupata doctrine is divided into six parts, known as: Karana (cause), Karya (work/task), Kala (divisibility), Vidhi (method), Yoga (union), and Dukhanta (the end of suffering).

According to some scholars, Lakulisha modified the Maheshwara doctrine by putting different interpretations on all five main concepts in that doctrine and placed special emphasis on the different kinds of behaviour to be adopted at each of the five stages, in their progress from initiation to the attainment of the unlimited powers of knowing, willing and acting on the terrestrial place. The doctrines of the Lakulisha Pashupatas are explained at length in Sayana Madhava's Sarva Darshana Sangraha (p. 108, Cowell & Gough) Sarva-Darsana-Samgraha by Sayana-Madhava – Tr. by E.B. Cowell.

== Iconography and images ==
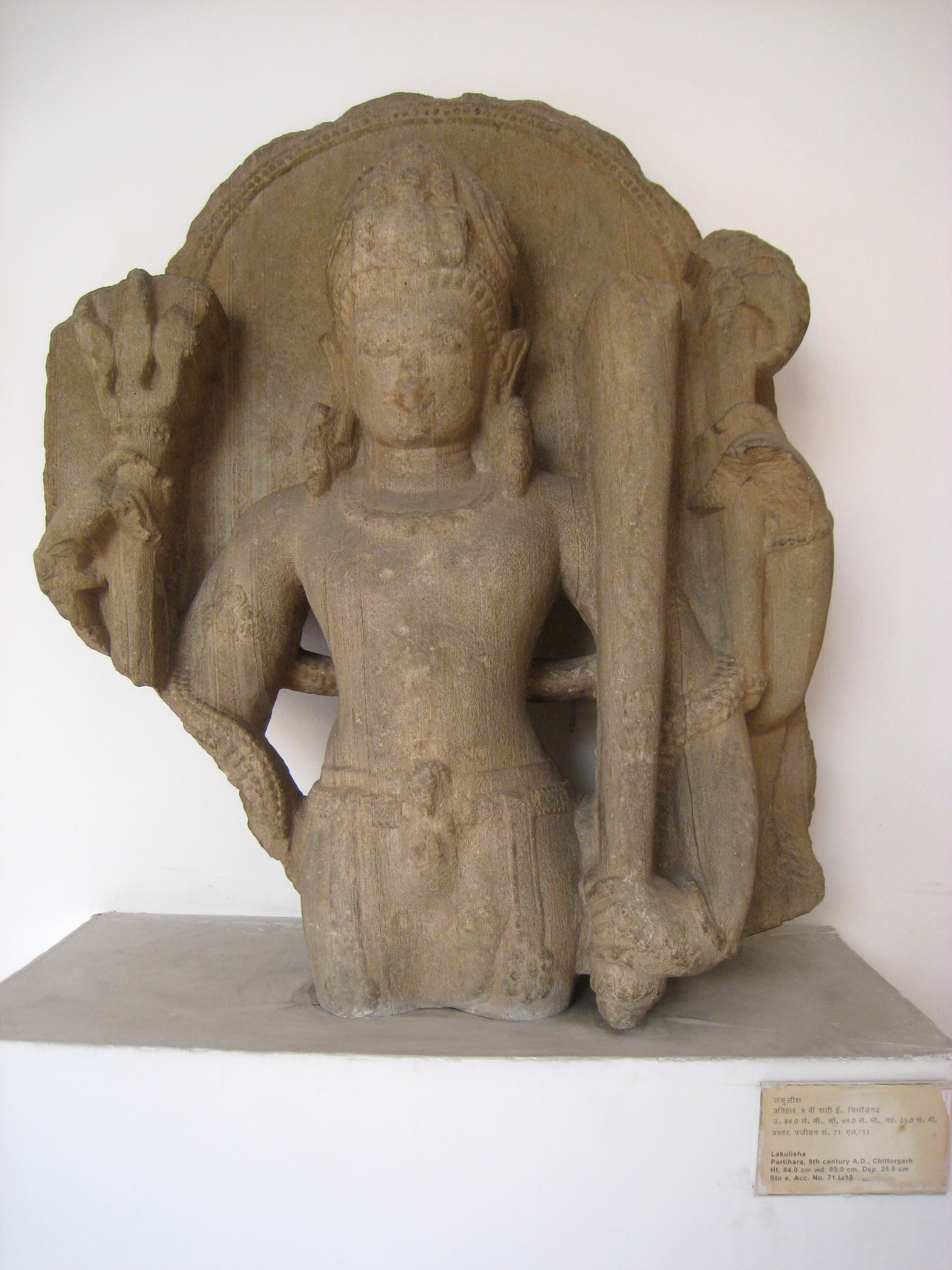
Statue of Lakulisha, Pratihara, 9th century CE.

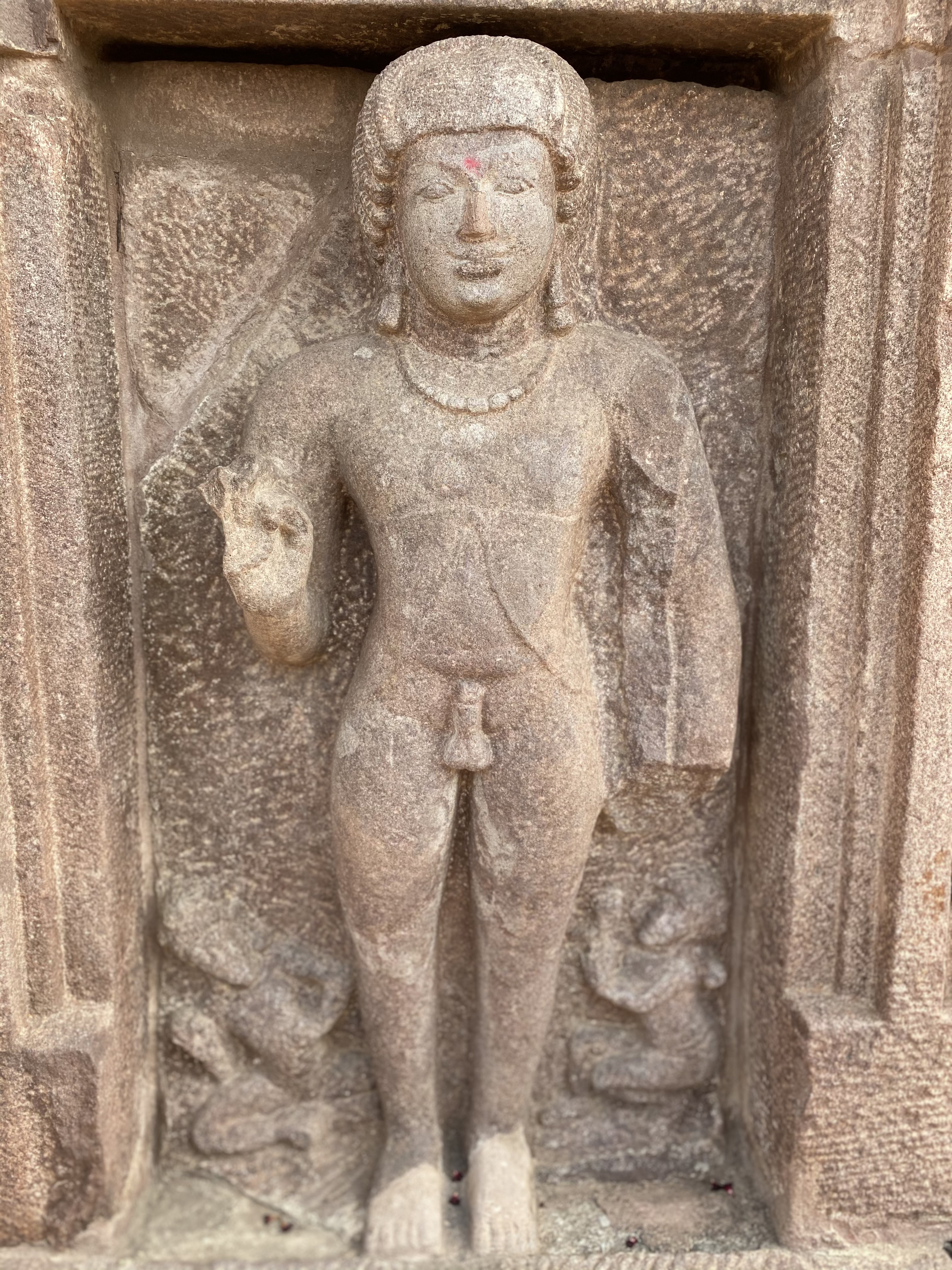
Lakulisha carving on the outer walls of Kudavelly Sangameswara temple at Alampur, Telangana built by Pulakesi I, circa 540 CE - 566 CE.

Lakulisha has been deified as an incarnation of Shiva, and is represented in front of the linga in the 6th to 8th centuries and also in the medieval period in temples of Kayavarohana and Timberva in Gujarat. These icons are some more examples of iconic, image-lingas. D.R. Bhandarkar mentions that the image in the sanctum of the Lakulishvara temple in Karvan is "the conjoint figure of Brahmeshvara and Lakulisha, confirming the statement of the Mahatmya that Lakulisha merged himself with Brahmeshvara". Brahmeshvara refers to the Shiva-linga. Lakulisha was identified with Mahesha (Shiva) in the Karvan Mahatmya and in iconographical programmes of several temples of Orissa and Rajasthan. So the images of Lakulisha conjoint with the linga, like other image-lingas, combine both the sakala (with form, manifest) and nishkala (formless, unmanifest) aspects of Shiva.

Lakulisha images have also been found in Saurastra, Gujarat, and also in some parts of the eastern India. Some of the images depict Lakulisha as a naked yogi and he carries prayer beads, a club, a cup of human skull. Lakulisha is shown as accompanied by animals. Almost all of Lakulisha's images appear as urdhav-linga (with an erect penis) but neither symbolizing fertility nor sexuality, but the refined energetic principles (Urdhva Retas) during Sāyaṇa or Asceticism.

Image of Lakulisha have been found depicted on the walls of the large hall at Elephanta Caves, suggesting that the caves may have been associated with Pashupata Shaivism. Icons of Lakulisha have also been found on the Laxmaneswar group of temples at Bhubaneswar, namely, the Satrughneswar, Bharateswar and Laxmaneswara temples.

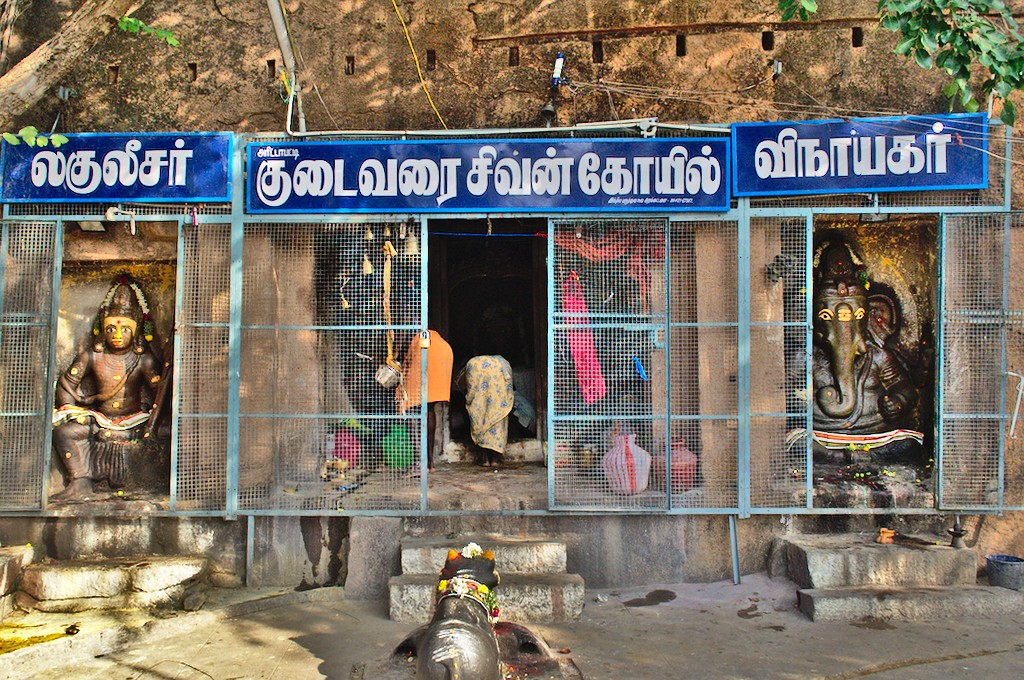
Rock-cut temple with bas relief of Lakulisha in the left, Pandya, 7th century CE.

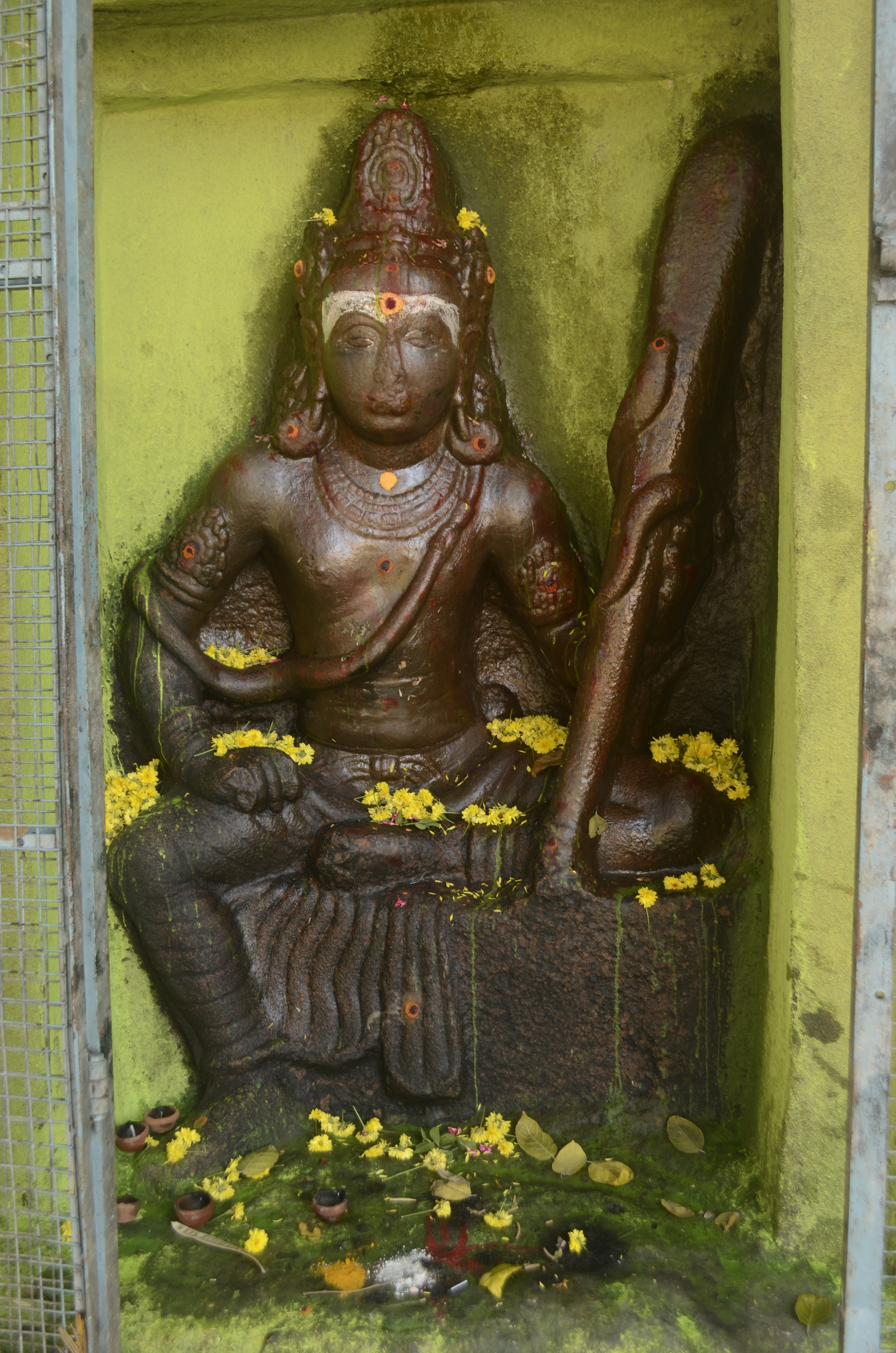
Bas relief of Lakulisha, Pandya, 7th century CE.

A rock-cut Shiva temple with bas reliefs of Ganapati and Lakulisa, carved by the seventh century Pandyas, is located at Arittapatti near Madurai. This temple is maintained by the Archeological Department of Tamil Nadu.

Lakulisha carvings are also found on Kudavelly Sangameswara and Balabrahmeswara Swamy temples at Alampur, Gadwal Jogulamba district, Telangana.

== See also ==
- Lakulisa Mathura Pillar Inscription
