= Lakulisa Mathura Pillar Inscription =

4th century Sanskrit inscription

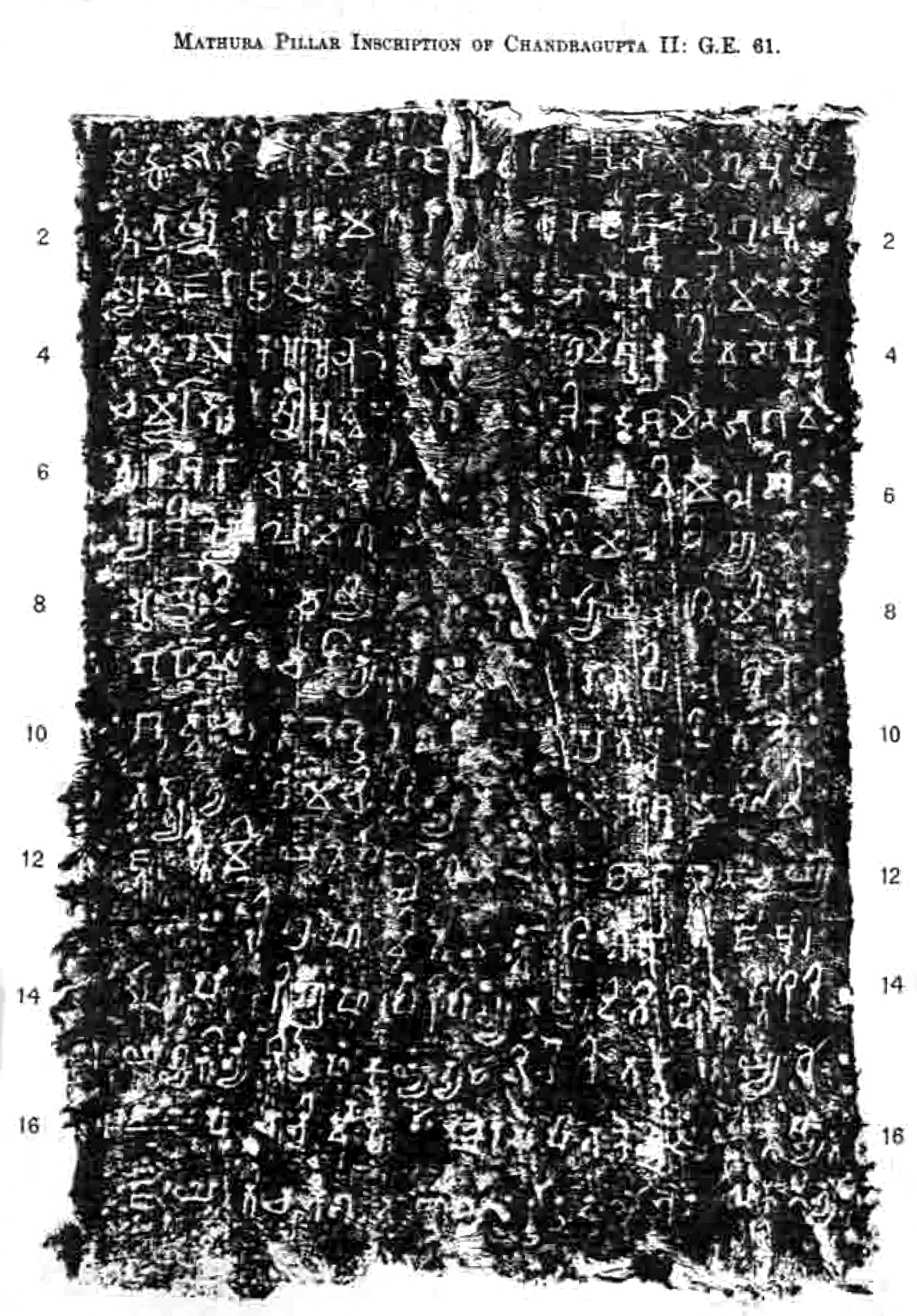
- Material: Stone
- Writing: Sanskrit, Gupta script
- Created: 380 CE
- Period/culture: Gupta Empire era
- Discovered: Mathura, Uttar Pradesh
- Present location: Mathura Museum, Madhya Pradesh

Location
- Mathura (India)

The Lakulisa Mathura Pillar Inscription is a 4th-century CE Sanskrit inscription in early Gupta script related to the Shaivism tradition of Hinduism. Discovered near a Mathura well in north India, the damaged inscription is one of the earliest evidences of murti (statue) consecration in a temple made to celebrate gurus (preceptors, gurvayatane). It is, according to the Indologist Michael Willis, crucial to understanding the "history of Pashupata Shaivism" and a floruit for the antiquity of its practices. The Lakulisha Mathura inscription is one of the earliest epigraphical evidence of a developed Shaiva initiation tradition. (Note: The evidence, however, is not isolated. Seven inscribed copper-plates dated between 370 and 379 CE have been discovered where Maharaja Bhulunda in a kingdom based in what is now Madhya Pradesh makes grants to Shaivism and Shaktism. These plates record his gift of land and him granting a temple [now lost] the right to enjoy, cultivate, and inhabit the temple lands. The king also grants in these copperplates, states Sanderson, a means of support and maintenance of a temple to Matrikas (Shakti mothers) established by a Bhagavat Lokodadhi, who is called a "Pashupata officiant" (pāśupatācārya).)

== Description ==
The inscription was found in 1928 on the central section of a pillar attached to a well in Chandul Mandul Bagichi, Mathura, not far from a Hindu temple dedicated to Shiva. After its discovery, an antique dealer removed it and put it in his house. The locals complained and the pillar was seized by the police, from where it arrived in the Mathura Museum in 1929. In 1931, Sastri made the first copies of the inscription and in 1932, Bhandarkar published the inscription along with his analysis.

The Lakulisha Mathura pillar inscription consists of horizontal lines across five zones of the pilaster over about 2.25 feet (0.69 m) by 1.5 feet (0.46 m) surface area. The pillar's top and bottom sections are squares, the middle is an octagon. The pillar is smooth on just one top face, one bottom face and five of the eight middle faces. All the remaining surfaces are rough, which led Bhandarkar to propose that this pillar was probably a part of a temple shrine pilaster that was demolished and cut out for some other use. (Note: The shape of characters found in the Lakulisha inscription are epigraphically similar to those found in other inscriptions found in the western parts of the Gupta Empire. This narrows the likely original location of this pillar to around Mathura, Haridwar and Mehrauli, with Haridwar the most probable location.) The piece somehow reached a well in Mathura. The smooth top face has a carving that shows a trident (trisula), while the bottom face also has a sculpture that shows a nude male likely Lakulisha, which together confirm that the pillar is related to Shaivism tradition of Hinduism. The middle part of the pillar has the inscription. Of the five smooth faces, the middle zone is damaged, which likely contained the most important part of the inscription with significant historical details. It is unclear if the inscription was added at the time the pilaster was being constructed, or later. According to Bhandarkar the temple with the pilaster already existed before 380 CE, and that the inscription was added on the available space about 380 CE.

The discovered inscription is in Sanskrit in early Gupta script, similar to other early Gupta era inscriptions found near Mathura. D.C. Sircar states that the script is closer to the Middle Brahmi, 2nd-century CE Kushana script. It is in prose, except the last part which is in the Vedic Arya meter. According to Sanskrit prosody rule, that part of the inscription constitutes only the first half of the meter, and the second half is missing or was never engraved.

Given the damaged characters, neither the exact date is known nor whether the "60 and 1" year mentioned in the inscription (61st year) is referring to start or end of that 61st year. Further, the complexity of lunisolar Hindu calendar has added to the confusion. This has led to proposals that date it variously between 379 and 381, with 380 CE more common.

=== Inscription without interpolation ===
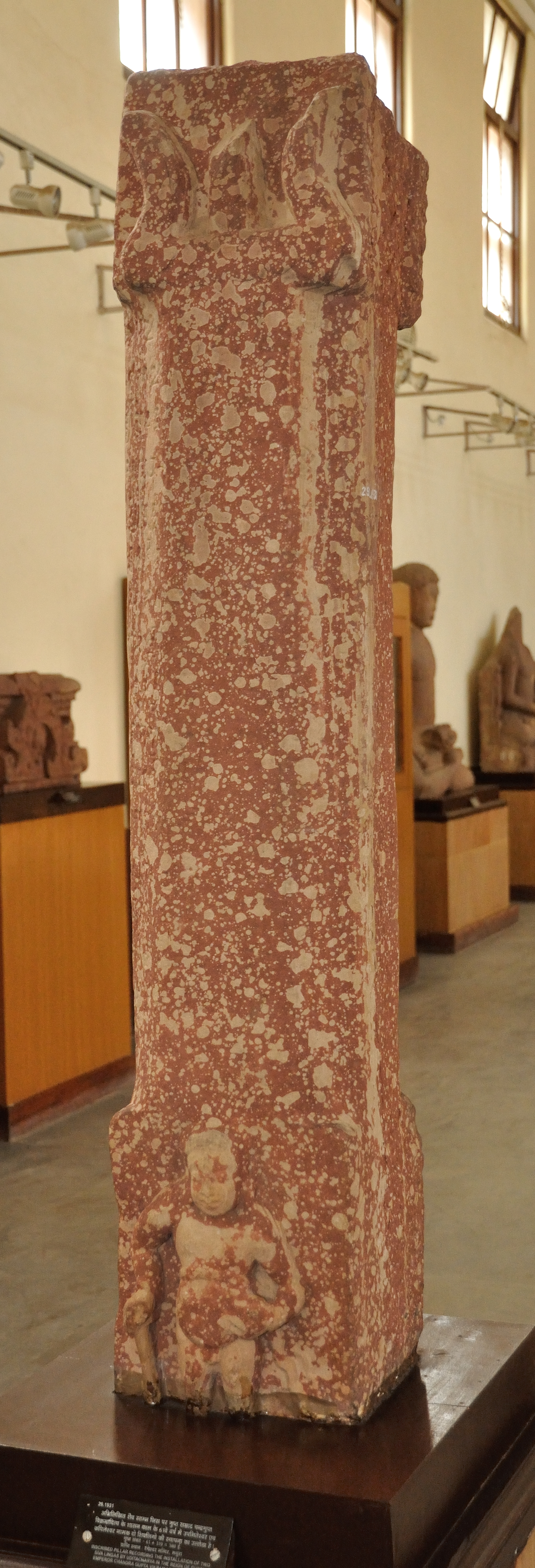
The inscribed pillar recording the installation of two Shiva Lingas by Udita Acharya in the "year 61 following the era of the Guptas in the reign of Chandragupta Vikramaditya, son of Samudragupta" (380 CE). Rangeshwar Temple. Mathura Museum No. 29.1931. The end of the inscription is visible on the corner to the left.

The inscription without any reconstruction and interpolation reads:

siddham bhattarakamaharaja...raja srisamudraguptasa...trasya
bhattarakama...j....rajasricandraguptasya vijarajyasamvatsa
... kalanuvarttamanasamvatsare ekasasthe ....thame sukladivase
pamcamyam asyam purvva.....ga....sikad dasamena bhagavatparasarac
caturthena .......p....vimalasisyasisyena bhagavad....vimalasisyena
aryyodi....caryye.....pu....pyayananimittam gurunam ca
kirtya......rakapilesvarau gurvvayatane guru .... pratisthapito
naitat khyatyarttham abhili....ya..... m...hesvaranam vijnaptix kriyate
sambodhanam ca yathaka...nacaryyanam parigraham iti matva
visanka....pujapuraskara.... parigrahaparipalyam kuryyad iti vijnaptir iti
yas ca kirtyabhidroham kuryy...d yas cabhilikhitam uparyy adho va sa
pamcabhir maha...patakair upapatakais ca samyuktas syat jayati ca
bhagava....... rudradando gra....yako nitya....

– Mathura Lakulisa Pilaster Inscription, 380 CE

=== Inscription with interpolation and reconstruction ===
Bhandarkar proposed the following reconstructed inscription:

siddham bhattarakamaharaja(rajadhi)raja srisamudraguptasa(tpu)trasya
bhattarakama[ha](r)[aja-ra]j[adhi]rajasricandraguptasya vijarajyasamvatsa[re pam](came)
[.....] kalanuvarttamanasamvatsare ekasasthe 60 1[....][pra]thame sukladivase
pamcamyam asyam purvva(yam bha)ga(vat-ku)sikad dasamena bhagavatparasarac
caturthena (bhagavat-ka)p(ila)vimalasisyasisyena bhagavad(upamita)vimalasisyena
aryyodi(ta)caryye(na sva)pu(nya)pyayananimittam gurunam ca
kirtya(rttham upamitesva)rakapilesvarau gurvvayatane guru [....] pratisthapito
naitat khyatyarttham abhili(kh)ya(te atha) m(a)hesvaranam vijnaptix kriyate
sambodhanam ca yathaka(le)nacaryyanam parigraham iti matva
visanka(m)pujapuraskara(m) parigrahaparipalyam kuryyad iti vijnaptir iti
yas ca kirtyabhidroham kuryy(a)d yas cabhilikhitam uparyy adho va sa
pamcabhir maha(a)patakair upapatakais ca samyuktas syat jayati ca
bhagava(n dandah) rudradando gra(na)yako nitya(m)

– Reconstructed Mathura Lakulisa Pilaster Inscription, 380 CE

=== Translation of reconstructed inscription ===
Bhandarkar translates it as:

Accomplished! In the ..... year — of the victorious reign of the Bhattaraka Maharaja Rajadhiraja, the illustrious Chandragupta, the good son of the Bhattaraka Maharaja Rajadhiraja, the illustrious Samudragupta — on the fifth of the bright half of the First [Ashadha) of the year 61 following the Gupta era.

On this aforesaid (tithi), (the Lingas) Upamitesvara and Kapilesvara (comprising the portraits of) the teachers were installed in the Teachers’ Shrine. Arya Uditacharyya, tenth from the Bhagavat Kusika, fourth from the Bhagavat Parasara, a stainless disciple’s disciple of the Bhagavat Upamita (and] a stainless disciple of the Bhagavat Kapila, for the commemoration of the preceptors and for the augmentation of the religious merit of self.

(It is) not written for my own fame, but for beseeching the worshippers of Maheshvara. And it is an address to (those who are) the Acharyyas for the time being. Thinking them to bo (their own) property, they should preserve, worship, and honour (them) as (their own) property. This is the request. Whosoever will do harm to those memorials or (destroy) the writing above or below, shall be possessed of the five great sins and the five minor sins. And may divine Danda (Note: This is identified in Pashupata tradition as an epithet for Lakulisha. However, the danda part is a Bhandarkar-reconstructed part of the inscription, a reconstruction that has been questioned.) be always victorious, whose staff is terrific and who is the foremost leader.

== Significance ==
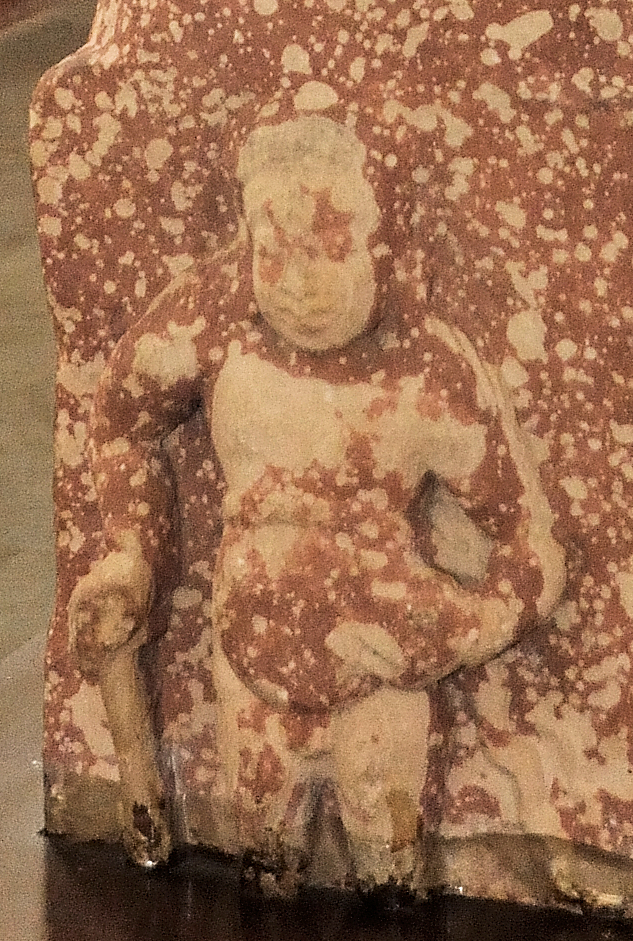
Detail of early Gupta relief, Lakulisa Mathura Pillar.

The inscription mentions Chandragupta II, and is the earliest from the Gupta era that can be confidently established. The inscription mentions two Shaiva gurus found in historic texts of Pashupata Shaivism, namely Upamita and Kapila. It adds that the donor Uditacarya added memorials to both preceptors in an ayatana (temple shrine), thus providing a 4th-century floruit to shrines for gurus. The Lakulisha inscription is also notable for its mention of puja of teachers, because their "souls approximated Shiva after death", states Willis. This is one of the constant and historic premises of moksha (liberation) in yogic Shaivism. This idea and spiritual goal, according to Willis, is also found midst early Vaishnavism.

According to Alexis Sanderson, prior to the 4th-century CE, the existence of devotionalism for Shiva is attested only in various texts whose dating is unclear and best approximated between 200 BCE and 350 CE. These include, for example, the term Sivabhagavatas in the Mahabhasya of Patanjali. The first epigraphic evidence of Shaiva adherents who use guru initiation for spiritual guidance and practice is found, states Sanderson, between 350 and 400 CE, in the form of Lakulisa inscription of Mathura along with the copper plate grants of Maharaja Bhulunda in what is now Bagh (Dhar district) of Madhya Pradesh. The inscription does not use the word Pashupata, nor does it mention Lakulisha, but states Sanderson it "conveys as much by declaring that Uditacarya is the tenth in the teacher-disciple transmission from Bhagavat Kusika, presumably venerated as the source of the lineage".

The Mathura Lakulisa Inscription attests to the existence of a Shaiva temple with an installed linga and an overall Puja tradition in the Gupta era. It provides a floruit of 380 CE for the devotional worship of Shiva in north India. The inscription also confirms the significance of the Lakulisa tradition in north India by the 4th-century, and has been the basis for Bhandarkar's theory that dates Lakulisa to early 2nd-century CE.
