= Pashupata-sutra =

Pashupata-sutra (IAST: Pāśupatasūtra) is a Sanskrit-language text regarded as revelation by the Pashupata Shaivite sect of ancient India. Dated between 400 and 550 CE, it is the earliest surviving text of the Pashupatas. Kauṇḍinya wrote a commentary called Panchartha-bhashya (IAST: Pañcārtha-bhāṣya) on the text.

== Contents ==
In the text, Shiva enters the dead body of a Brahmana, which comes to life as Lakulisha and imparts teachings to four disciples.

According to the text, a Pashupata ascetic must be a Brahmana male who does not speak with people from the low castes or women. He transcends to a stage beyond the four stages of life of the Vedic tradition, by undertaking various observances in three stages.

In the first stage, a person aspiring to be Pashupata ascetic should:

- reside in the environs of a Shiva temple
- bear the mark of a Pashupata ascetic, that is, the ashes in which he bathes thrice daily
- worship with "song, dance, laughter, and mantra repetition"
- develop virtues such as not stealing, celibacy, not harming creatures etc.

The aspirant (sadhaka) thus gradually purifies himself, and enters the second stage. He leaves the temple, and engages in anti-social behavior in order to attract verbal and physical abuse. The text states that the aspirant's sins pass over to his abusers, and their merits pass over to him. Examples of these anti-social behaviors include:

- pretending to be asleep in public places
- making one's limbs tremble and pretending to be paralyzed
- limping
- pretending to be mad
- engaging in lewd behavior towards young women

Next, the aspirant enters the third stage, where he should:

- reside away from the public in a deserted house or cave
- live off alms
- meditate upon the five sacred mantras of Shiva and the syllable Om

The text states that after following these practices, the aspirant unites his soul with Shiva. After six months in this union, he starts living in a cremation ground, survives on whatever is available, and finally dies. He thus unites with Shiva, and ends all his sorrows through Shiva's grace.
