= Pashupata Shaivism =

Oldest of the major Shaivite Hindu schools

Pashupata Shaivism (Pāśupata, Sanskrit: पाशुपत) was the first major Shaivite Hindu schools. The Pashupata movement may have existed from the 1st or 2nd century CE onward, and was influential in South India in the period between the 7th and 14th century.

The main texts of the school are Pāśupatasūtra with Kauṇḍinya's Pañcārthabhāṣya, and Gaṇakārikā with Bhāsarvajña's Ratnaṭīkā. Both texts were discovered only in the twentieth century. Prior to that, the major source of information on this sect was a chapter devoted to it in Vidyāraṇya's Sarvadarśanasaṅgraha.

== History ==
The date of foundation of the school is uncertain, but may have existed from the 1st or 2nd century CE onwardd. They are referred to in the epic Mahabharata which is thought to have reached a final form by the 4th century CE. The Pashupata movement was influential in South India in the period between the 7th and 14th century. The philosophy of the Pashupata sect was systematized by Lakulīśa also called Nakulīśa in the 2nd century CE.

The mainstream which follows Vedic Pāśupata penance are 'Mahāpāśupata' and the schism of 'Lakula Pasupata' of Lakulisa. There is a debate about the origin of this schism. On one hand, the Goan school of Nakulisa darsana believes that Nakulisa was pioneer and that Lakulisa and Patanjalinatha were his disciples. On the other hand, the Gujarat school believes that Nakulisa and Lakulisa are one. Sarvadarśanasaṅgraha written by Vidyaranya (sometimes also known as Madhavacharya) mentions it as "Nakulisa Darsana" not as "Lakulisa Darsana". Both sub schools are still active in their own areas.

During his travels through India in the early 7th century, the Buddhist pilgrim monk Xuanzang reported seeing the adherents of Pashupata sect all over the country. In the region of Malwa, he mentions seeing a hundred temples of different kinds with Pashupats making a majority. In the capital city of the place called ’O-tin-p’o-chi-lo (Atyanabakela), he saw a temple of Shiva, ornamented with rich sculptures, where the Pashupats dwelled. In another city called Langala on the way to Persia from India he reports seeing several hundred Deva temples with a richly adorned Maheshwara temple where the Pashupats were exceedingly numerous and offered their prayers.

One of the last surviving influential Vedic Pasupata mathas was the Eka Veerambal matha which existed up to the late 18th century administering the Jambukeswarar Temple, Thiruvanaikaval temple near Trichy and the Ramanathaswamy Temple.

== Overview ==
Pashupata Shaivism was a devotional (bhakti) and ascetic movement. Pashu in Pashupati refers to the effect (or created world), the word designates that which is dependent on something ulterior. Whereas, Pati means the cause (or principium), the word designates the Lord, who is the cause of the universe, the pati, or the ruler. To free themselves from worldly fetters Pashupatas are instructed to do a pashupata vrata. Atharvasiras Upanishsad describes the pashupata vrata as that which consists of besmearing one's own body with ashes and at the same time muttering mantra — "Agni is ashes, Vayu is ashes, Sky is ashes, all this is ashes, the mind, these eyes are ashes."

Haradattacharya, in Gaṇakārikā, explains that a spiritual teacher is one who knows the eight pentads and the three functions. The eight pentads of Acquisition (result of expedience), Impurity (evil in soul), Expedient (means of purification), Locality (aids to increase knowledge), Perseverance (endurance in pentads), Purification (putting away impurities), Initiation and Powers are —

Acquisition	knowledge	penance	permanence of the body	constancy	purity
Impurity	false conception	demerit	attachment	interestedness	falling
Expedient	use of habitation	pious muttering	meditation	constant recollection of Rudra	apprehension
Locality	spiritual teachers	a cavern	a special place	the burning ground	Rudra
Perseverance	the differenced	the undifferenced	muttering	acceptance	devotion
Purification	loss of ignorance	loss of demerit	loss of attachment	loss of interestedness	loss of falling
Initiations	the material	proper time	the rite	the image	the spiritual guide
Powers	devotion to the spiritual guide	clearness of intellect	conquest of pleasure and pain	merit	carefulness

The three functions correspond to the means of earning daily food — mendicancy, living upon alms, and living upon what chance supplies.

== Philosophy ==
Pashupatas disapprove of the Vaishnava theology, known for its doctrine servitude of souls to the Supreme Being, on the grounds that dependence upon anything cannot be the means of cessation of pain and other desired ends. They recognize that those depending upon another and longing for independence will not be emancipated because they still depend upon something other than themselves. According to Pashupatas, spirits possess the attributes of the Supreme Deity when they become liberated from the 'germ of every pain'. In this system the cessation of pain is of two kinds, impersonal and personal. Impersonal consists of the absolute cessation of all pains, whereas the personal consists of development of visual and active powers like swiftness of thought, assuming forms at will etc. The Lord is held to be the possessor of infinite, visual, and active powers.

Pañchārtha bhāshyadipikā divides the created world into the insentient and the sentient. The insentient is unconscious and thus independent on the conscious. The insentient is further divided into effects and causes. The effects are of ten kinds, the earth, four elements and their qualities, colour etc. The causes are of thirteen kinds, the five organs of cognition, the five organs of action, the three internal organs, intellect, the ego principle and the cognising principle. These insentient causes are held responsible for the illusive identification of Self with non-Self. The sentient spirit, which is subject to transmigration is of two kinds, the appetent and nonappetent. The appetent is the spirit associated with an organism and sense organs, whereas the non-appetent is the spirit without them.

Union in the Pashupata system is a conjunction of the soul with God through the intellect. It is achieved in two ways, action and cessation of action. Union through action consists of chanting of sacred mantras, meditation, etc. and union through cessation of action occurs through consciousness.

== Rituals ==
Rituals and spiritual practices were done to acquire merit or puṇya. They were divided into primary and secondary rituals, where primary rituals were the direct means of acquiring merit. Primary rituals included acts of piety and various postures. The acts of piety were bathing thrice a day, lying upon sand and worship with oblations of laughter, song, dance, sacred muttering etc.

== See also ==
- Indian philosophy
- Kashmir Shaivism
- Shaiva Siddhanta
