= Ishana =

Hindu direction deity

- Regent of the Northeast Direction
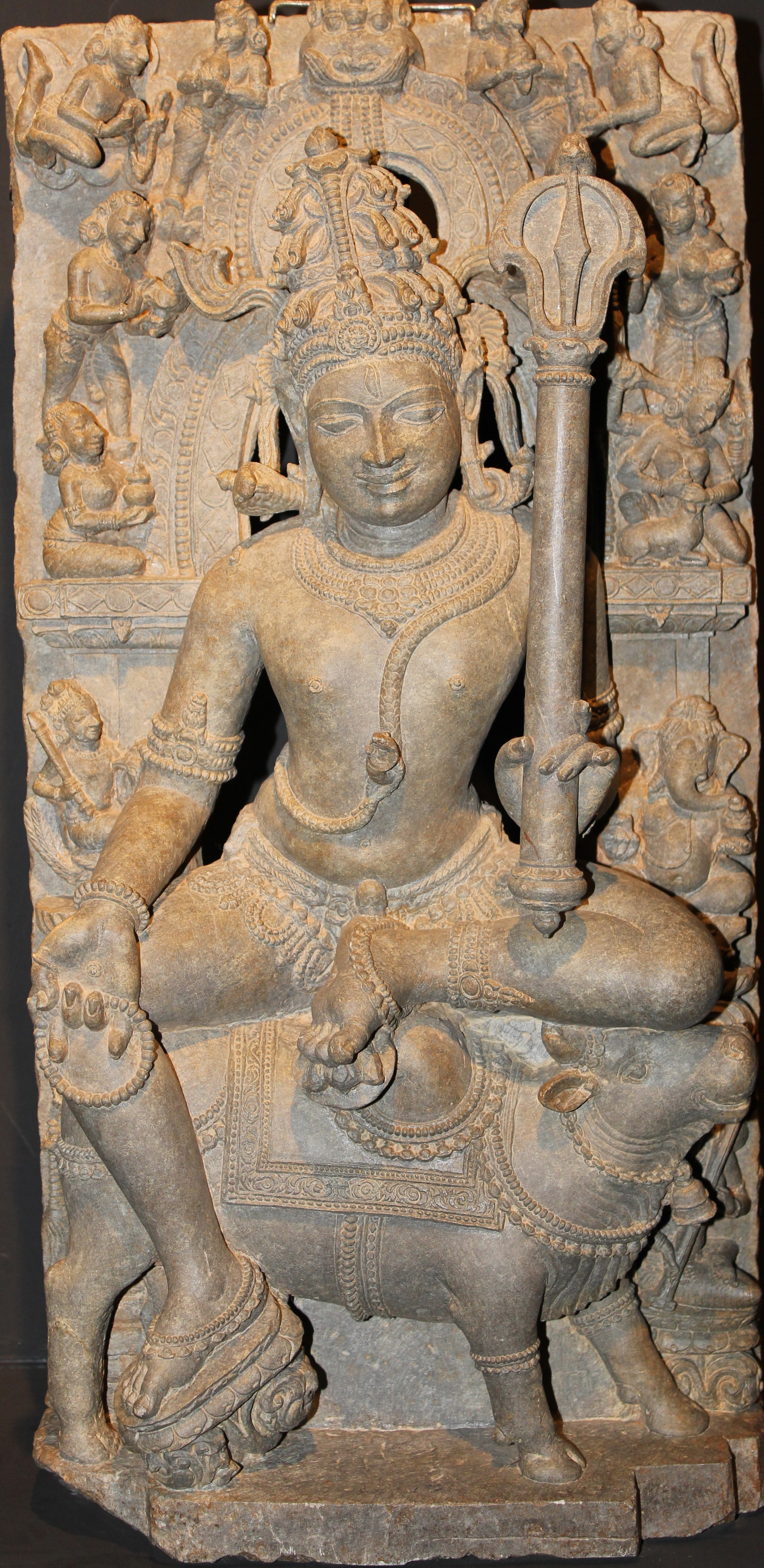
- Affiliation: Shiva, Deva
- Gender: Male
- Consort: Chhinnamasta

Ishana (Sanskrit: ईशान, IAST: Īśāna), is a Hindu god and the dikpala of the northeast direction. He is often considered to be one of the forms of the god Shiva in Ashtamurti, and is also often counted among the eleven Rudras. He is venerated in Hinduism, some schools of Buddhism and Jainism. In the Vastu Shastra, the north-eastern corner of a plot of land is referred to as "Ishana". Ishana also shares qualities with Samhara Bhairava and is therefore a part of the Ashta Bhairava.

== Iconography ==
Ishana is described as having three eyes, a tranquil appearance and white complexion, dressed with a white cloth and a tiger's skin. On his head, a jata-makuta which has on top of it the crescent moon must be placed.

He may be seated on a white bull, or simply in the padmasana though being seated on the bull is preferred.

If he is represented with only two arms, his hands must carry a trident and a kapala or one of the hands (the left one generally) might be in the varadamudra; if, however, he has four hands, the two front ones should be sculptured as playing upon a veena and the others are to be held in the varada and abhaya mudras. Gopinatha Rao suggests that description might be incorrect, as the veena must be held only by the hands of the front pair of arms, which are also the very hands that are necessarily to be in the varada and abhaya poses.

When represented in Lingam form along with the other Panchabrahmas, his face, uncarved, would face upward.

One verse of the Linga Purana describes Ishana as having three feet, seven hands, four horns and two heads while in one verse of the Shiva Purana, he is described as "resembling pure crystal".

== Hinduism ==
=== Vedas ===
An early mention of Ishana is in one of the Pañchabrahma Mantrāṇī found in the Taittiriya Aranyaka (TA 10.21.1) of the Krishna Yajurveda (c.1200 BCE):

ईशानस्सर्वविद्यानां ईश्वरस्सर्वभूतानां ब्रह्माधिपतिर्ब्रह्मणोऽधिपतिर्ब्रह्माशिवो मे अस्तु सदाशिवोम्।
īśānassarvavidyānām īśvara-ssarvabhūtānām-brahmādhipatir-brahmaṇo’dhipatir-brahmā-śivo me astu sadāśivom

Translation by Sabharathnam Sivacharyar:

"Lord Ishana—the Supreme Lord and Revealer of little knowledge through lord Ishvara and spiritual disciplines, the nourisher and controller of all living beings, the Directing Lord of northeast, He who is the guided by main direct authority of the Vidyeshvaras, who directs Brahma, Vishnu and others—may He who is vidyeshwara present Himself in this Sivalinga. By such benign presence, let there occur absolute purity and auspiciousness in Shiva. Om"

Ishana is also mentioned in the Vajasaneyi Madhyandiniya Samhita of the Shukla Yajurveda (VS 27.35), which the Shiva Purana calls the "Ishana Mantra", though the Purana calls a different verse from the same Samhita which also mentions Ishana (VS 39.8) the "Ishana Mantra" as well.

=== Puranas ===
Several Puranas mention Ishana; a few of them are detailed here:

==== Shiva Purana ====
In the Shiva Purana, Ishana is described as a form or aspect of Shiva. The Purana states that Ishana bestows knowledge and riches on those with intelligence, while curbing evil-doers. Ishana is declared to be the form of Shiva presiding over the ear, speech, sound and ether as well as the "individual soul, the enjoyer of Prakriti".

The Purana also asserts that the "Ishana Mantra" should be recited when fixing Lingams to pedestals, when wearing rudraksha beads on the head or (only for some) when wearing sacred ash.

==== Linga Purana ====
One verse of the Linga Purana describes Ishana as "the omnipresent lord of all". In another verse, one who makes the idol of Ishana is said to be "honoured in the world of Vishnu." In one verse, he is said to hold an axe while in another, he is described as wielding a trident. Ishana described as being stationed in every being as the organ of speech.

The Purana mentions Ishana as one of the deities present at Daksha's sacrifice who was attacked by Virabhadra. He is also described as having attended the svayamvara of Parvati to Shiva.

==== Brahmavaivarta Purana ====
The Brahmavaivarta Purana states that Ishana was born out of the left eye of Krishna. He is described as wearing tiger's skin, adorned with a crescent crown on his head, possessing three eyes and holding a trident, patissa (sword) and club. He became the leader of the Dikpalas.

=== Pañchabrahma ===
The Pañchabrahmas are five specific aspects of Shiva collectively taken together. These aspects include Sadyojata, Vamadeva, Aghora, Tatpurusha, and Ishana. Each of these aspects are glorified in their own mantra in the Pañchabrahma Mantrani present in the Taittiriya Aranyaka (TA 10.17-21).

These aspects of Shiva are often depicted in five-faced Lingams which Stella Kramrisch states are physical equivalents of the five Pañchabrahma Mantrani, with each face of the five-faced lingams corresponding to one of the Mantras and representing a particular manifestation of Shiva.

As one of the Panchabrahmas, Ishana is the source of spontaneous grace directed to all beings and to all worlds.

=== Vastu Shastra ===
According to Vastu Shastra, it is auspicious for homes and offices to be situated in the northeast. North is the direction wealth resides, associated with Kubera, while East is the direction where knowledge resides, associated with Indra. For this reason, Ishana symbolizes the culmination of both knowledge and wealth.
