= Pashupati =

Form of the Hindu god Shiva

Pashupati (Sanskrit: पशुपति, IAST: Paśupati, lit. 'lord of animals') is an epithet of Rudra in the Vedic period and later, a form of the Hindu deity Shiva, in his benign aspect as the five-faced herdsman of all creatures.

== Etymology ==
Paśupati means 'lord of animals'. Paśu indicates animal as well as a follower of Shiva.

== History ==
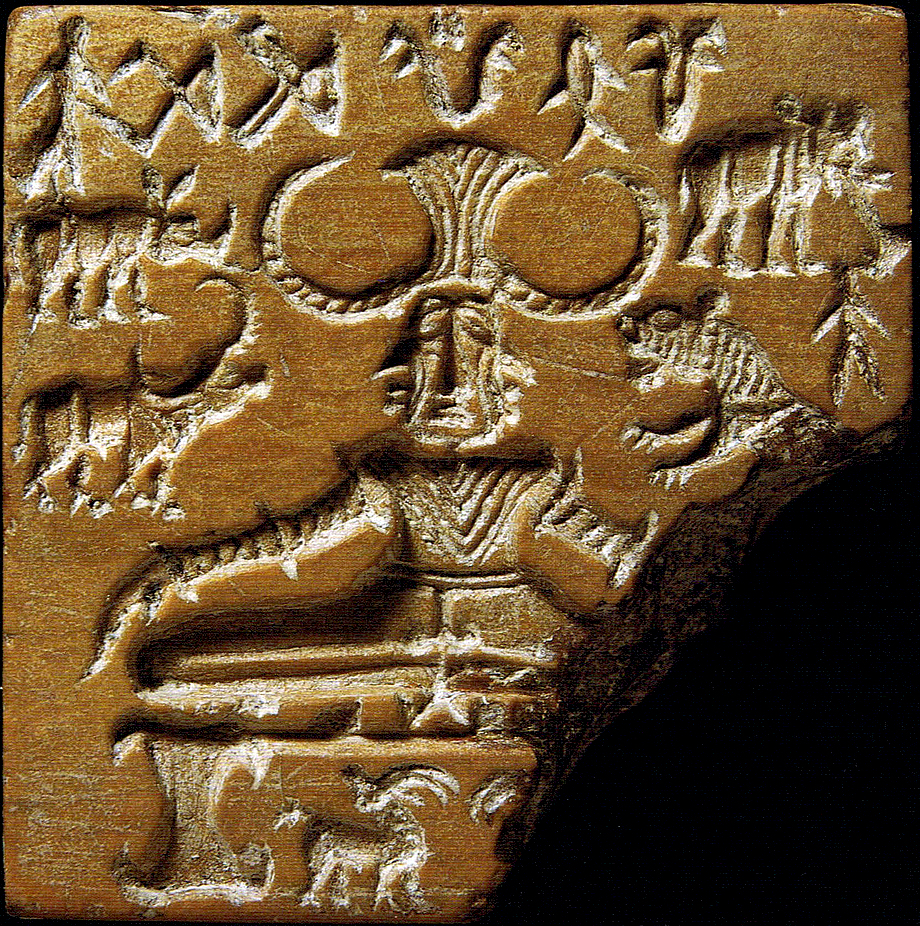
The Pashupati seal, showing a figure surrounded by animals who is thought to be Shiva; circa 2350-2000 BCE. It is preserved in National Museum of India, New Delhi

The earliest claimed evidence of Pashupati comes from the Indus Valley Civilisation (3300 BCE to 1300 BCE), where the Pashupati seal has been said to represent Shiva or a proto-Shiva figure.

=== Vedas ===
Pashupati was generally applied as an epithet of Rudra in the Samhitas and the Brahmanas. In the Atharvaveda, Rudra is described to be the lord of the bipeds and the quadrupeds, including creatures that inhabited the earth, woods, the waters, and the skies. His lordship over cattle and other beasts denoted both a benevolent and destructive role; he slew animals that incurred his wrath, but was also kind to those who propitiated him, blessing them with health and prosperity.

=== Pashupata Shaivism ===
Pashupata Shaivism is one of the oldest Shaivite sects that derives its name from Pashupati. The sect upholds Pashupati "as the supreme deity, the lord of all souls, and the cause of all existence".

=== Nepala Mahatmya ===
In the Nepala Mahatmya, found in regional versions of the Skanda Purana, Markandeya narrates the origin of Pashupati to the sage Jaimini. Accompanied by his consort Parvati, Shiva visited the Śleṣmātaka forest upon the banks of the Bagmati in the form of a deer, while she assumed the form of a doe. Brahma, Vishnu, and Indra, confounded by his absence, scoured the three worlds in search of him. When they finally discovered Shiva in the Himalayas, they were surprised to find him bearing one horn, three eyes, surrounded by his consort and a flock of deer. After they venerated him, they realised that he did not wish to return to his divine form. The deities attempted to subdue Shiva by holding his horn, which broke upon their touch into four parts as he leapt across the riverbanks. When the deities begged Shiva to return to his abode and his place in the universe, he told them that he would reside in the forest for all time in the form of the deer, and would henceforth be known as Pashupati. He stated that the four horns would be consecrated as four lingams across the region. He declared that those who worshipped him in this aspect would never be born as animals, and would be blessed with good virtues.

== Iconography ==
The five faces of Pashupati represent the five forms of Shiva: Sadyojata (also known as Varuna), Vamadeva (also known as Uma Maheshvara), Tatpurusha, Aghora, and Ishana. They face the west, north, east, south and zenith respectively, representing the pancha bhuta (five basic elements) of the Hindu cosmos, namely earth, water, air, light and ether.

The Puranas describe these faces of Shiva as:

Sadyojata, Vamadeva, Tatpurusha, and Aghora are the four faces,
The fifth is Ishana, unknowable even to the seers.

== By country ==
=== Nepal ===
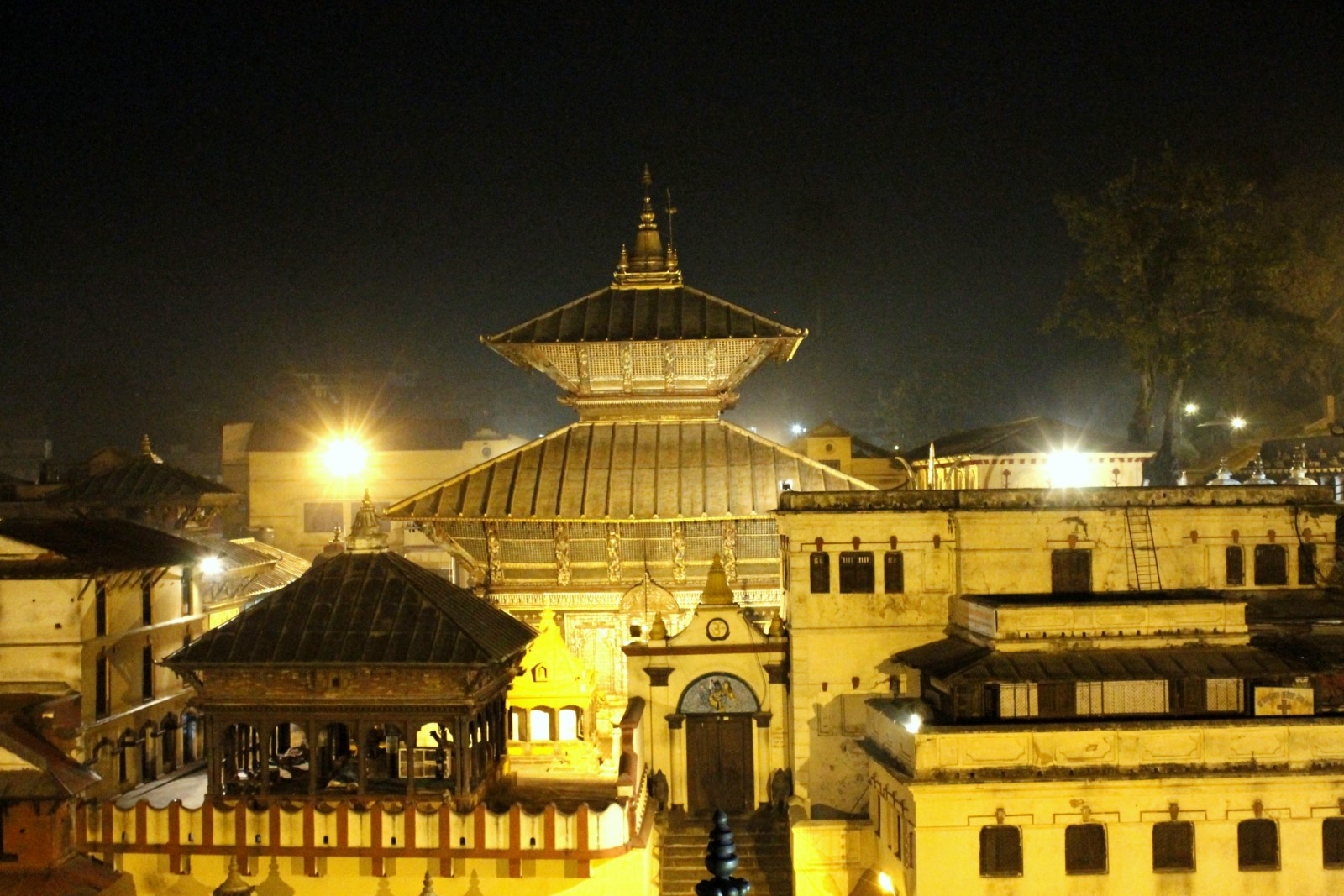
Pashupatinath Temple, Nepal

Although Nepal is a secular state, its population is predominantly Hindu. Pashupati is traditionally considered to be the guardian deity of Nepal. The Pashupatinath Temple, located at the bank of the river Bagmati, is considered one of the most sacred places in Nepal. In mythology it is said that Pashupatinath started living in Nepal in the form of a deer because he was enchanted by the beauty of Kathmandu Valley.

=== India ===
The Pashupatinath Temple in Mandsaur is sited on the banks of the Shivana river in Mandsaur, Madhya Pradesh, India. It is one of the most important shrines of Mandsaur, and Shiva in the form of Pashupati is its primary deity.
