= Pañcānana =

Five faces of Shiva in Hinduism

The pañcānana (Sanskrit: पञ्चानन), also called the pañcabrahma, are the five faces of Shiva corresponding to his five activities (pañcakṛtya): creation (sṛṣṭi), preservation (sthithi), destruction (saṃhāra), concealing grace (tirobhāva), and revealing grace (anugraha). The names, qualities, and attributes of these five aspects of Shiva are described in the Śaiva agamas and puranas.

== Aspects ==
Though bearing each a different name, form, and set of qualities, these are all aspects of Śiva and are not to be looked upon as different deities.

=== Sadyojāta ===
Sadyojāta represents Icchā Śaktī. This face of Śiva gives both happiness and sadness to all creatures. The direction of this face is West. This face of Śiva can potentially evoke curse and anger from Śiva. It also represents the Jalandhara Pīṭha. There are one billion mantras trying to describe this face of Śiva. It is white in color. Ahaṃkāra element representing perfected ego. The fearsome aspect. This aspect is attained by solitude and practices that transcend conventional structures.

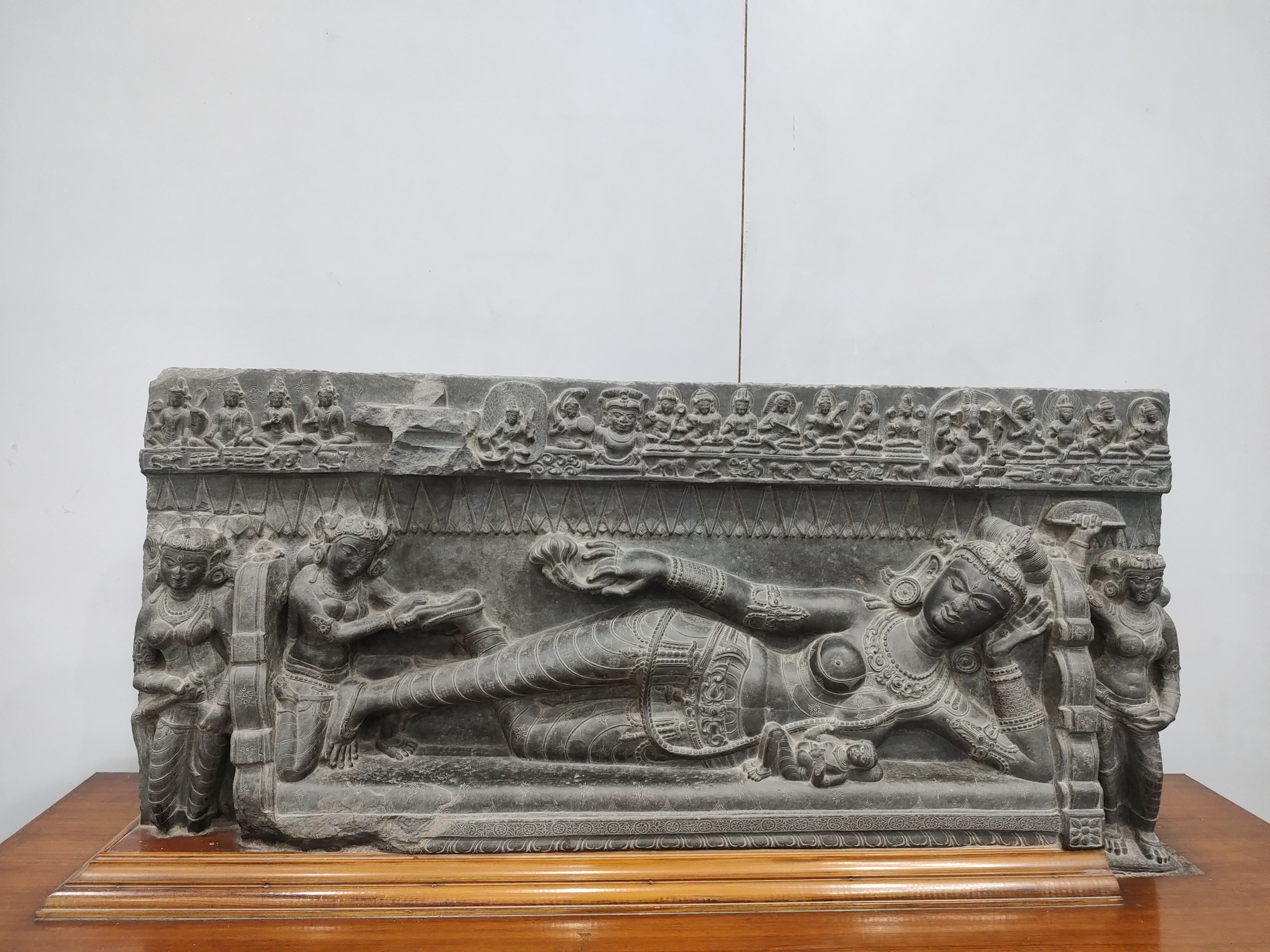
Sadyojāta at Cooch Behar Palace Museum, West Bengal, India.

=== Vāmadeva ===
Vāmadeva represents Citta rūpa and Citta rūpiṇi of Śiva. This is Turīya, attained by getting acquainted with primordial energy of the sun. This face of Śiva has special powers to heal both mentally and physically of any creature. This face represents Parāliṅga. There are two billion mantras trying to describe this face of Śiva. It is blood red in color and it represents unmatched force that is capable of transforming all elements of the cosmos. Uplifts the element of Tejasa. The direction of this face is North. Predominates the energy of vital life force. It represents indescribable amount of brightness of light. Only those established in yoga can contain it within their physical forms, otherwise the mortal frame sheds itself immediately resulting in union with Vamadeva. The adepts contain energy of creation of elements within themselves.

=== Aghora ===
Aghora represents Jñāna Śaktī (Infinite Knowledge). It is the function of Prakṛti (nature, consort of Shiva) and Parā Śaktī. This face of Śiva is Buddhi rūpa (Intellect) and it represents Pūrṇagiri Pīṭha. Banaliṅgam. There are one billion mantras trying to describe this face of Śiva. The direction of this face is South and it is smoky (Dhumra varṇa) in color. It represents the balanced aspect of Ahaṃkāra Tattva (our ego nature). It is a mixture of Prāmaṇa and Prameya. It represents the forces of Rudra.

=== Tatpuruṣa ===
Tatpuruṣa represents Ānānda Śaktī. The direction of this face is the East. Kāmagiri Pīṭham. Manorūpa. It represents structure of soul and how the individual merges with infinite. There are two billion mantras trying to describe this face of Śiva. It is yellow in color. Svayambhuva liṅga. If you have severe difficulty in focusing on any subject, you should meditate this face of Śiva. Śiva in this face meditates to the east.

=== Īśāna ===
Īśāna represents the Citta Śaktī of Śiva. Sāmbā Pīṭham. This face represents Space. Starts from your Mūlādhāra to Anahata to Ajna to Sahasrara leading to Brahma Randra in your body. There are one billion mantras trying to describe this face of Śiva. Ākāśa (Ether) Tattva. The individual is from very less to not at all receptive to social structures. Possesses excellent qualities of controlling mortal and divine beings with ease. The individual has reduced his ego to ashes signifying absolute love for the universe and has been freed from cosmic law. The direction of this face is upward (also called skyward).

=== Summary ===
	Ishana	Tatpurusha	Aghora	Vamadeva	Satyojata
Five activities	Revelation	Concealment	Destruction	Preservation	Creation
Direction looking	Upwards	East	South	North	West
Colour	Crystal	White	Red	Black	Gold
Panchabhutas	Sky	Air	Fire	Water	Earth
Shiva's form	Sadasiva	Maheshvara	Rudra	Vishnu	Brahma
Meditation focal point	Head	Mouth	Heart	Feet	Genital organs
Philosophy	Siddhanta	Gāruda	Bhairava	Vāma	Bhuta
Teachings	Mantramarga	Atimarga	Adhyatmika	Vaidika	Temporal

== Meditation ==
Depending on one's Rāśi, Lagna, Daśā, Antardaśā, Janma Nakṣatra, whichever is strong one should meditate that face of Śiva.

For example, Aghora represents South. If one's resultant is south (i.e., rāśi, lagna occupies south direction of Sun in your horoscope), they can mediate Southern face of Śiva i.e., Aghora. Depending on the problematic area of life, Kendra, Koṇa, Duṣṭhāna, Trikoṇa, Āpoklima - one should meditate that face of Śiva to get some relief in that problematic area.

For example, with somebody having Taurus (Vṛṣabha) rāśi as lagna, having Venus is in 11th bhāva i.e., Pisces (Mīna). Running Daśā is Guru Daśā and Antardaśā is Saturn.

In another example in which Venus is strong in Pisces, but he is running Guru Daśi; if Guru is present in Dhanus, then we consider him as weak because he is occupying the 8th House. Since Guru is present in north east corner of the horoscope, he should start with Northern face of Śiva mantra.

== See also ==
- Pancabrahma Upanishad

== Bibliography ==
- Shastri, J.L., ed. (1970). The Śiva Purāṇa. Translated by Shastri, J.L. Delhi: M. Banarsidass. ISBN 9780895814777.
