= 101 Zen Stories =

1919 compilation of Zen koans

101 Zen Stories is a 1919 compilation of Zen koans including 19th and early 20th century anecdotes compiled by Nyogen Senzaki, and a translation of Shasekishū, written in the 13th century by Japanese Zen master Mujū (無住) (literally, "non-dweller"). The book was reprinted by Paul Reps as part of Zen Flesh, Zen Bones. Well-known koans in the collection include A Cup of Tea (1), The Sound of One Hand (21), No Water, No Moon (29), and Everything is Best (31).

== See also ==
- Blue Cliff Record
- The Gateless Barrier
- Book of Equanimity
