= Joann Peterson =

American social worker and educator (1934–2007)

Joann S. Peterson
- Born: July 26, 1934; U.S.
- Died: January 9, 2007 (aged 72)
- Known for: Director of Education, Haven Institute
- Spouse(s): Peter Peterson, M.D.

Joann S. Peterson (July 26, 1934 – January 9, 2007) was an American social worker, counsellor, author and lecturer. She taught seminars internationally, and was the first Director of Education at the Haven Institute.

== Personal and professional development ==
Born premature and abandoned at birth, she struggled with physical developmental challenges as a child; she experienced chronic, unrelenting pain every day of her adult life. Rather than succumb to a passive life of victimhood, she worked with her challenges, and excelled academically. Her own experiences of suffering gave her particular insight and empathy for others with difficulties, and she was known as a caring, empathetic counsellor and teacher. But she was also disciplined and rigorous, and expected her students to embrace personal responsibility without complaint, as she had done.

== Career ==
Peterson earned a B.A. degree at Willamette University (1956); a M.S.W. degree at University of Washington (1958); Dip.C. from the Haven Institute (1990); and a Ph.D. from the Open International University (2000). She did some of the pioneering work in the field of child sex abuse in San Diego, California. Later, she was a key figure in the development of mental health services in Bellingham, Washington. She left private clinical practice to assume the position of Director of Education at the Haven Institute on Gabriola Island, B.C. Canada in 1990, and held this position until her death in early 2007. Peterson developed and led a wide variety of groups for The Haven. She collaborated with Bennet Wong and Jock McKeen for over thirty years. She facilitated personal and professional development seminars throughout North America and Southeast Asia. Her last book was translated into Chinese in Taiwan.

== Contributions ==
=== Child sex abuse ===
Abused in her adoptive family, she had a special affection and ability with youngsters who were undergoing physical, emotional or sexual abuse. She wrote about her experiences, and contributed much to the field in this domain. She taught seminars for individuals and couples in the area of human sexuality.

=== Family therapy ===
Her clinical work focused on families in crisis. She served as a consultant for agencies and trained professionals in psychology and social work for over 40 years. She authored numerous articles, and wrote many research grants in the field of child abuse prevention.

=== Responsible anger ===
Peterson authored two books and a DVD about responsible anger expression. Based on the Anger, Boundaries and Safety workshop she developed and led over 15 years, her writing on anger emphasizes the benefits to physical and mental health, and to relationships, of the non-violent, bounded expression of anger.

=== Human dialogue ===
In her work, she was always focussed on helping individuals and families to come into human dialogue with each other, overcoming the distances created by objectification. She wrote and taught about separation and loss, mirroring, boundaries and depression. She designed an experiential workshop entitled "Disengaging Depression" which was based on her staunch belief that people can overcome psychological and physical difficulties through courage and personal responsibility.

Violence abounds, both at the micro and macro level. In relationships, and in communities and countries around the world, people are living out violence and naming it anger. This is evident in the blatant, abhorrent behaviors that are intended to be retaliative, to do harm, and to control. In this violence people are turned into labels, roles and objects, and contact with the person is lost. An enemy is created. Paranoia grows, and our humanity suffers an erosion at the level of the soul. Ultimately we distance from our evolutionary energy of human connection. And in this disconnection we experience an acute, pervasive loneliness and isolation.

— Joann Peterson

== Publications ==
- Peterson, Joann (1956), "Impact of Hospital Admitting Procedures upon Young Children", USA National Social Science Research Council Report, USNSSR Council.
- Peterson, Joann (1974), "Use of Volunteers in High Risk Nurseries", Proceedings of Perinatal Social Work.
- Peterson, Joann. "Parent Aide Programs: The Reparenting Process", Proceedings of the American Academy of Pediatrics, 1981.
- Peterson, Joann (1981), "Child Sex Abuse", Outpatient Model, San Diego, CA: Child Protection Center, Children’s Hospital.
- Peterson, Joann. "Management of the Abusive Family", San Diego, CA: Child Protection Center, Children's Hospital,Parent Aide Program, 1981.
- Peterson, Joann. "Child Development", San Diego, CA:Child Protection Center, Children's Hospital,Training Cassettes,1981.
- Peterson, Joann. "Intervention Programs", San Diego, CA: Child Protection Center, Children's Hospital,Training Cassettes, 1981.
- Peterson, Joann. "Sexual Abuse Identification", San Diego, CA: Child Protection Center, Children's Hospital,Training Cassettes, 1981.
- Peterson, Joann. "Identification of High Risk Families", San Diego, CA: Child Protection Center, Children's Hospital and Sharp Hospital,Premature Nursery Project, 1982.
- Peterson, Joann (1983), "Childhood: The Sexual Continuum and Sexual Abuse", Social Work Practice, C, pp. 141–146.
- Peterson, Joann. "Sexual Abuse: Issues of Body and Boundary", Cortes Island, BC: Heartwood, Issue #9, Fall 1984.
- Peterson, Joann. "Intervention With Abusive Families", San Diego, CA: Child Protection Center, Children's Hospital,Parent Aide Program, 1990.
- Peterson, Joann. "Choosing Anger", Gabriola Island, BC: Shen, Issue #5, Spring 1990.
- Peterson, Joann (Spring 1991), "Life Choices by Courageous Kids", Shen, vol. 7, Gabriola Island, BC.
- Peterson, Joann (Spring 1992), "Separation and Loss", Shen, vol. 9, Gabriola Island, BC.
- Peterson, Joann (Spring 1996), "Mirroring - The Discovery of the Self", Shen, vol. 17, Gabriola Island, BC.
- Peterson, Joann (Spring 1999), "Disengaging Depression", Shen, vol. 23, Gabriola Island, BC.
- Peterson, Joann (2001), Anger, Boundaries & Safety, Gabriola Island, BC: PD Publishing, ISBN 0-9696755-5-0.
- Peterson, Joann (2006), A Book about Anger, Boundaries & Safety, Gabriola Island, BC: The Haven Institute Press, ISBN 0-9696755-8-5.
- Peterson, Joann (Spring 2004), "Taking Haven Home", Shen, vol. 33, Gabriola Island, BC.
- Peterson, Joann (2007), Anger, Boundaries & Safety:Chinese Translation, Taipei, Taiwan: Living Psychology Publishers.
- Peterson, Joann (2007), The Anger Toolbox – A Blueprint for Responsible Anger, Boundaries & Safety (DVD), Gabriola Island, BC: The Haven Learning Library, Barcode 6-89076-55565-4.

== Sources ==
- Long, Wendy (March 1982), "Child Sexual Abuse: More Help Now Available", The Vancouver Sun, Vancouver, BC.
- Lemon, Judith (Fall 1997), "Thoughts of Depression", Shen, vol. 20, Gabriola Island, BC.
- Nicholls, Linda (Fall 2000), "SSFIIIHS Conference", Shen, vol. 26, Gabriola Island, BC.
- Wong, B.R.; McKeen, J. (2001), "Foreword", in Peterson, Joann (ed.), Anger, Boundaries & Safety, Gabriola Island, BC: PD Publishing, pp. xii–xiv, ISBN 0-9696755-5-0
- McNally, Ernie (Spring 2002), "In Her Own Words", Shen, vol. 29, Gabriola Island, BC.
- Merlin, Peggie (Fall 2002), "Getting Sex Off the Chores List and Re-claiming the Mystery", Shen, vol. 30, Gabriola Island, BC.
- Izzard, Denese (November 13, 2003), "The Haven's First Symposium Alive and Well", The Sounder, Gabriola Island, BC, p. 8.
- Campbell, Leslie (October 2005), "Joann Peterson - The Resilient Life", Focus Magazine, vol. 18, no. 1, Victoria, BC, pp. 46–49.
- Allen, Wayne (2005), This Endless Moment, Waterloo, ON: Phoenix Centre Press, ISBN 0-9684446-2-8.
- Best, Andrew (2006), There Is A Place (DVD), Calgary, Alberta: The Haven Learning Library, Archetype Productions
- Herald, Staff Writer (January 2007), "Obituary: Joann S. Peterson", The Bellingham Herald, Bellingham, WA
