= Lilian Silburn =

Lilian Silburn

Lilian Silburn (1908–1993) was a French Indologist specialising in Kashmir Shaivism, Tantra and Buddhism.

Silburn studied philosophy and Indology under Paul Masson-Oursel and others. During World War II, she joined the French National Centre for Scientific Research and remained associated with it since. Her students included André Padoux.

Working together with Louis Renou, she translated from Sanskrit and published the core scriptures of Kashmir Shaivism, including Shiva Sutras of Vasugupta, Vijnana Bhairava Tantra, and others, many being first-ever translations of the recently discovered texts. Silburn, a student of Lakshman Joo, authored Kundalini: The Energy of the Depths, A Comprehensive Study Based on the Scriptures of Nondualistic Kasmir Saivism (Shaiva Traditions of Kashmir, State University of New York Press, 1988). In the view of the scholars of religion Sravana Borkataky-Varma and Anya Foxen, the book is "without doubt the most genuinely erotic treatment of tantra and Kuṇḍalinī to date", especially given (they note) that it is "a formal academic study".

Her life and depth of insight has made some consider her a modern mystic.
