= Lakshman Joo =

Hindu saint (1907–1991)

Swami Lakshman Joo
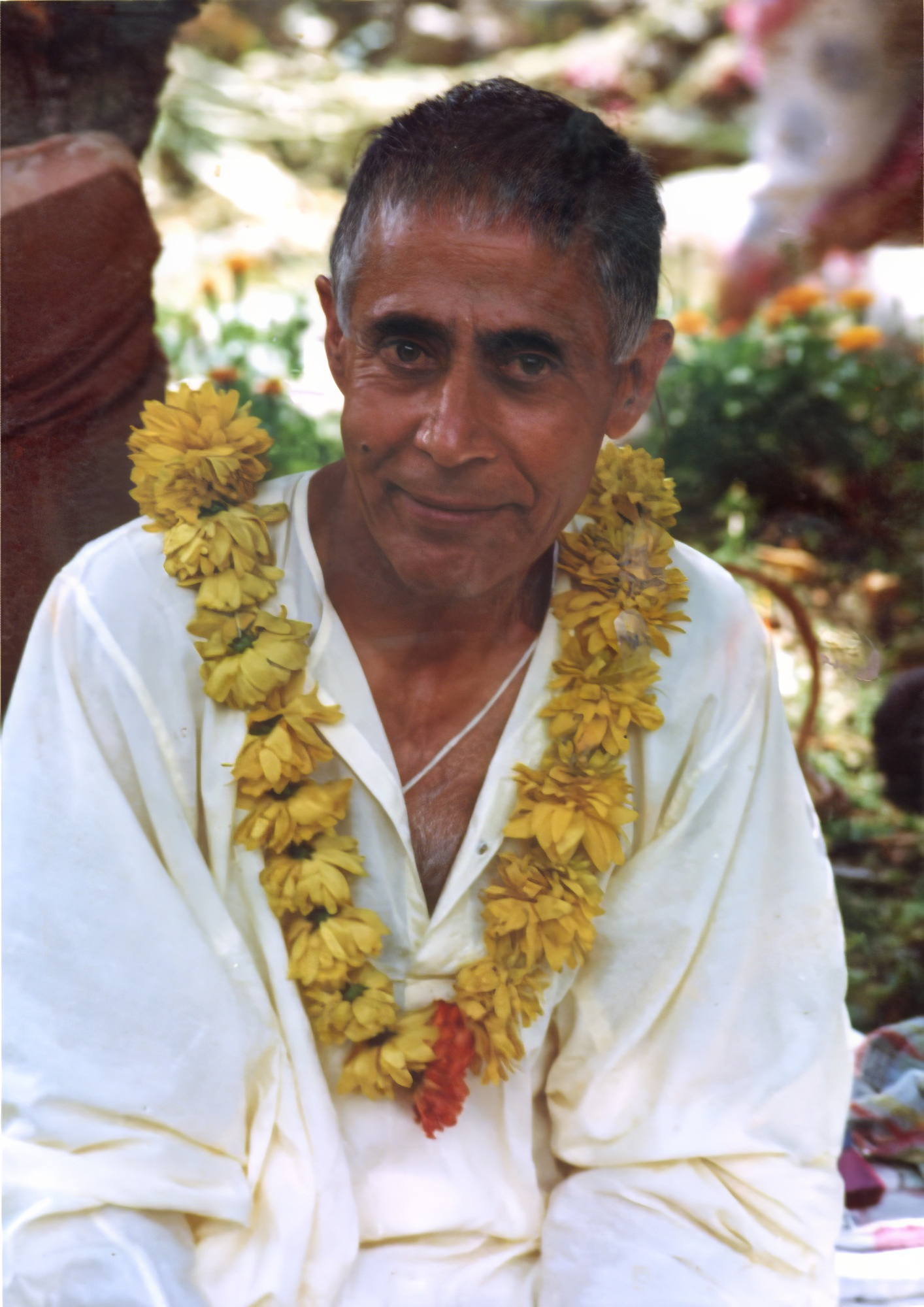
- Lakshman Joo in 1974
- Born: Lakshman Raina; 9 May 1907; Srinagar, Kashmir and Jammu, British Raj (modern-day Srinagar district, Jammu and Kashmir, India)
- Died: 27 September 1991 (aged 84); Noida, Gautam Buddha Nagar, Uttar Pradesh, India

Lakshman Joo (9 May 1907 – 27 September 1991), born Lakshman Raina and also called Swami Lakshmanjoo or Lal Sahib by his followers, was a Hindu saint, mystic and scholar and teacher of Trika Shaivism (Kashmir Shaivism).

== Biography ==
Lakshman Joo was born in a Kashmiri Hindu Brahmin family in the city of Srinagar in Kashmir. He was the fifth child in a household of four boys and five girls. Other sources state that at birth, Lakshman had five siblings, one elder brother and four sisters. His mother's name was Aranyamali (Raina).

At the age of five, he was introduced to the path of spirituality by his elder brother Maheshvaranath. Up to the age of eight his spiritual progress in the lineage of Trika Shaivism (Kashmiri Shaivam) was monitored by his family priest, Pandit Swami Rama Joo (1854-1915), and later by his chief disciple Swami Mehatab Kak (1870-1942).

At the age of 19, it is said, he experienced self-realisation. Shortly afterwards he left home, as he described, "in search of the Supreme" and moved to the ashram of Sadhamalyun (Sadhuganga) in Handwara. Persuaded by his father, he returned to Srinagar after his father built a small house in the factory premises where he could practice his meditation undisturbed and for seven years (1926-1933), he continued to study Sanskrit and Shaiva philosophy under the guidance of scholar Pandit Maheshwar Nath Razdan.

Although Swamiji had a separate house for himself, he was not happy as he had the disturbance of factory and family members at that place. In 1934, Lakshman Joo moved to an isolated place in Ishber hills above the village of Gupta Ganga near Nishat suburb of Srinagar, where his parents built him a new house.

Around the age of 30, Lakshman Joo travelled in India, meeting Mahatma Gandhi at Sevagram, Rabindranath Tagore at Shantiniketan, Sri Aurobindo at Pondicherry, and Ramana Maharshi at Tiruvannamalai for a few weeks about which Lakshmanjoo later expressed: “I felt those golden days were indeed divine.”

For almost three decades (1930-1960), Lakshman Joo had a habit to spend the winter months in silence and seclusion, while taking occasional visits from scholars in the summer. The Indian Spiritual Master Meher Baba visited him in 1944. In 1948 Lilian Silburn from the National Centre for Scientific Research, Paris, visited him and returned regularly for the next ten years. During this time, she studied the major texts of Kashmir Shaiva philosophy, all of which were published in French.

Paul Reps, the American artist, author and poet came to Kashmir in 1957 and studied the ancient text of Vijnana Bhairava Tantra with Lakshman Joo and later published the 112 practices of transcending in the fourth chapter of his book Zen Flesh, Zen Bones. This teaching also influenced Osho, and formed the basis of The Book of Secrets.

In 1962, a new ashram (the present ashram) was constructed by Lakshman Joo at a site between the famous Mughal Gardens (Nishat) and Guptaganga located in the foothills of the Zaberwan mountain, overseeing the Dal Lake and near Nishat Gardens. The Ashram was named “Ishwar Ashram”. In 1965, Lakshman Joo attended a Sanskrit conference in Varanasi, chaired by the Sanskrit Tantra scholar Gopinath Kaviraj. Maharishi Mahesh Yogi visited the Swami each summer from 1966 to 1969, and they formed a lasting relationship. Baba Muktananda, of Siddha Yoga also visited on two occasions.

Swami Lakshman Joo taught until his death in 1991, delivering weekly lectures on the mystical and philosophical texts of Kashmir Shaivism. Many of these lectures were audio recorded by John Hughes and later published. Lakshman Joo's interpretation of Kashmir Shaivism attracted the attention of both Indian and western Indologists. He had correspondence with Professor Giuseppe Tucci of the University of Rome La Sapienza, and his regular visitors included Jaideva Singh, Nilkanth Gurtu, Acharya Rameshwar Jha, Raniero Gnoli, Alexis Sanderson and Mark Dyczkowski.

In 1991 the Swami traveled to the United States and established the Universal Shaiva Fellowship where he designated John Hughes and his wife Denise to continue publishing his teachings of Kashmir Shaivism. In India the teachings of Lakshman Joo are represented by Ishwar Ashram Trust, an organisation founded shortly after his death.

== Selected publications ==
- 1933 – Gitartha Samgraha (Abhinavagupta's commentary on the Bhagavad Gita)
- 1943 – Hindi translation of Sambpanchashika
- 1958 – Sri Kramanayadipika (Hindi) on the 12 Kali-s
- 1964 – Hindi translation of Utpaladeva's Shivastotravali
- 1982 – Lectures on practice and discipline in Kashmir Shaivism
- 1985 – Kashmir Shaivism: The Secret Supreme, edited by John Hughes (the essence of the first fifteen chapters of Abhinavagupta's Tantraloka)
- 1986 – Hindi commentary by Swami Lakshman Joo on Abhinavagupta's Bhagavad Gitartha Samgraha
- 1987 – Hindi translation of Panchastavi

Posthumously:

- 1992 – Self Realization in Kashmir Shaivism, Oral Teachings of Swami Lakshmanjoo, edited by John Hughes
- 2002 – English translation of Shiva Sutras, edited by John Hughes
- 2002 – Shiva Sutras of Vasugupta along with original audio recordings
- 2005 – Revelations on Grace and Spiritual Practice, original audio and DVD recordings
- 2006 – Trika Rahasya Prakriya, Sanskrit verses with Hindi commentary
- 2007 – Vijnana Bhairava, original audio and transcript, introduction by John Hughes
- 2009 – Bhagavad Gitartha Samgraha of Abhinavagupta (Revisited), Chapters 1–6, translated by Swami Lakshmanjoo, DVD
- 2013 – Bhagavad Gītā in the Light of Kashmir Shaivism, Chapters 1-18, translated by Swami Lakshmanjoo, DVD
- 2015 – Paramarthasara with Abhinavagupta's commentary, translated by Swami Lakshmanjoo, original DVD and transcript.
- 2016 – Abhinavagupta's Tantraloka, chapter One, translated by Swami Lakshmanjoo, original audio and transcript.
- 2016 – Spanda Karika of Vasugupta, and Spanda Sandoha of Kshemaraja, translated by Swami Lakshmanjoo, original audio and transcript.
- 2016 – Stava Cintamani of Bhatta Narayana, translated by Swami Lakshmanjoo, original audio and transcript.
- 2016 – Shaivismo de Cachemira. El Supremo secreto, translation into Spanish of Kashmir Shaivism. The Secret Supreme.
- 2017 – Shiva Sutras. El Despertar Supremo, translation into Spanish of Shiva Sutras. The Supreme Awakening.
- 2019 – Abhinavagupta's Tantraloka, chapters Two and Three, translated by Swami Lakshmanjoo, original audio and transcript.

=== Kashmir Shaivism – Library ===
Over a period of nineteen years John Hughes recorded Lakshman Joo's translations of the following texts. Transcripts of these lectures are maintained in the Universal Shaiva Fellowship library.

- Bhagavad Gitartha Samgraha of Abhinavagupta, translation and commentary by Swami Lakshman Joo, original audio recordings (Kashmir, 28 Nov. 1978 to 3 June 80).
- Bodhapancadashika of Abhinavagupta, translation and commentary by Swami Lakshman Joo, original audio recordings (Kashmir, 18 to 22 Oct 1980).
- Dehastadevatacakra of Abhinavagupta, translation and commentary by Swami Lakshman Joo, original audio recordings (Kashmir, 25 Oct to 12 Nov 1980).
- Interviews with Swami Lakshman Joo: Questions by John Hughes, Alexis Sanderson, Alice Christenson, original audio recordings (July 1974).
- Janma Marana Vicara: translation and commentary by Swami Lakshman Joo, original audio recordings (Kashmir, May 1975).
- Kashmir Shaivism, The Secret Supreme (Lectures in English), Swami Lakshman Joo, original audio recordings (Kashmir, 1972).
- Kashmiri Lectures on Practice and Discipline, Swami Lakshman Joo, original audio recordings (Kashmir, 1980).
- Paramarthasara (Abhinavagupta's commentary): Swami Lakshman Joo's comments on John Hughes' reading, original audio recordings (Kashmir, 26 April to 6 Sept 1972).
- Parapraveshika of Kshemaraja: translation and commentary by Swami Lakshman Joo, original audio recordings (Kashmir, 12 to 15 Nov 1980).
- Pratyabhijna Hridayam of Kshemaraja: Swami Lakshman Joo's answers John Hughes questions: original audio recordings (Kashmir, 26 April 1972).
- Paratrishika Laghuvritti of Abhinavagupta: translation and commentary by Swami Lakshman Joo, original audio recordings (Kashmir, 25 May 1974 to 6 July 1974)
- Paratrishika Vivarana of Abhinavagupta, translation and commentary by Swami Lakshman Joo, original audio recordings (Kashmir, 26 May 1982 to 24 Aug 1985).
- Revelations on Grace and Practice: A collection of Swami Lakshman Joo's original audio recordings plus transcript, ed. John Hughes (USA, 9 May 2005).
- Shivastotravali of Utpaladeva: translation by Swami Lakshman Joo, original audio recordings (Kashmir, June 1976 to Sept 1978).
- Shiva Sutra Vimarshini of Vasugupta: translation and commentary by Swami Lakshman Joo, original audio recordings (Kashmir, 7 June 1975).
- Spanda Karika of Vasugupta: translation and commentary by Swami Lakshman Joo, original audio recordings (Kashmir, 5 to 26 Aug 1981).
- Spanda Sandoha of Kshemaraja: translation and commentary by Swami Lakshman Joo, original audio recordings (Kashmir, 29 Aug to 9 Oct 1981).
- Special Verses on Practice Swami Lakshman Joo, original audio recordings (Nepal, 1988).
- Stavacintamani of Bhatta Narayana: translation and commentary by Swami Lakshman Joo, original audio recordings (Kashmir, 26 Nov 1980 to 17 July 1981).
- Tantraloka of Abhinavagupta (Chapters 1–18): translation and commentary by Swami Lakshman Joo, original audio recordings (Kashmir, 1976 to 1981).
- Vatulanath Sutras of Kshemaraja: Swami Lakshman joo, original audio recordings (Kashmir, 1975).
- Vijnana Bhairava: translation and commentary by Swami Lakshman Joo, original audio recordings (Kashmir, 1975).
- Vijnana Bhairava Questions: Swami Lakshman Joo, original audio recordings (Kashmir, July 1985).

=== Audio recordings in Kashmiri ===
- Kalika Stotra of Shivanandanatha, Recitation by Swami Lakshman Joo and devotees (Kashmir, 1977).
- Maharthamanjari of Maheshvarananda, translated by Swami Lakshman Joo (Kashmir, 1977).
- Paratrishika Vivarana, translated by Swami Lakshman Joo (Kashmir, 1982–83).
- Shiva Sutra Vimarshini of Vasugupta, translated by Swami Lakshman Joo (Kashmir, 1978).
- Shiva Stotravali of Utpaladeva with Kshemaraja's commentary, translated by Swami Lakshman Joo (Kashmir, 1975–85).
- Stuti Kushmanjali, translated by Swami Lakshman Joo (Kashmir, 1977).
- Tantraloka of Abhinavagupta (selected chapters), translated by Swami Lakshman Joo (Kashmir, 1975–85).

=== DVD recordings in English ===
- Bhagavadgitarthasamgraha of Abhinavagupta, translation and commentary by Swami Lakshman Joo, original video recordings (Nepal, 1990)
- Paramarthasara of Abhinavagupta, translation and commentary by Swami Lakshman Joo, original video recording (Nepal, 1990)
- Revelations on Grace and Spiritual Practice, Selections from translations and commentaries on Bhagavadgitarthasamgrah (video), Paramarthasara (video), and Tantraloka (audio). (Los Angeles, 2006)
- Special Verses on Practice by Swami Lakshman Joo, original video recordings (Nepal, 1988).
