= Shiva Sutras of Vasugupta =

Collection of aphorisms from Kashmir Shaivism

Shiva Sutras (Devanāgarī शिवसूत्र; IAST: Śivasūtra) are a collection of seventy-seven aphorisms that form the foundation of the nondual tradition of the spanda ("divine vibration) tradition. They are attributed to the sage Vasugupta of the 9th century C.E.

== Authorship ==
Vasugupta is said to have lived near Mahadeva Mountain in the valley of the Harvan stream behind what are now the Shalimar Gardens near Srinagar. One myth is that he received the aphorisms in a dream visitation of a Siddha or semi-divine being. Another is that Shiva came to him in a dream and instructed him to go to a certain rock on which he would find the teachings inscribed.

Historically the Shiva Sutras and the ensuing school of Kashmir Shaivism are a Tantric or Agamic tradition. The Kashmiri Shaivism is combination of Shaivism, Agama and Tantra.

== Structure ==
The text of Shiva Sutras is divided into three chapters, each dealing with certain means (upāya) for attaining Liberation. The first chapter provides the general philosophical background of Trika Shaivism and then describes Śāmhavopāya, or the means pertaining to Śambhu, i.e. Śiva. There, the revelation of Śiva as the Real I and true nature of reality occurs in thoughtless state by the mere orientation of the will. The means described in the second chapter belong to Śāktopāya, or the means pertaining to Śakti. They bring a yogī to the thoughtless state by concentration on I-consciousness, that is Śakti, and by understanding all internal and external phenomena as its manifestation. Finally, the third chapter, Āṇavopāya, deals with the means pertaining to a limited individual (aṇu). A yogī who cannot contemplate I-consciousness directly, realizes it by concentration on the intellect, vital energy, physical body or senses, or external objects. The three means of self-realization are presented in Shiva Sutras in the order from the highest to the lowest. A yogī is supposed to start with the highest means and if the practice is unsuccessful, resort to the lower means.

== Commentaries ==
A number of commentaries were written by Vasugupta's contemporaries or successors. Most famous of them is Kshemaraja's Vimarshini (10th Century C.E.). Another is a commentary called the Varttika by Bhaskara (11th century C.E.).

== Translations ==
There are many translations of the Shiva Sutras.

- Shiva Sutra Vimarshini by Jaideva Singh (English and Spanish).
- Shiva Sutra Vimarshini by Swami Lakshman Joo (English and Spanish).
- Shiva Sutra Vimarshini by Gabriel Pradīpaka (word-for-word translation, English and Spanish).
- Varttika by Bhaskara (11th century C.E.) by Dr. Mark Dyczkowski (English).
- A painstaking Italian translation of the Sutras and the Kshemaraja's Vimarshini by Raffaele Torella is also available. (Italian)
- Shiva Sutras with the Kshemaraja's Vimarshini by Demetrios Th. Vassiliades (Greek).
- Gerard D. C. Kuiken has also published a literal translation of the aphorisms without adding any insights or commentary.

The Fifth Guru of Kriya yoga (Babaji's lineage), Shailendra Sharma gave yogic commentaries to Shiva Sutras in 1993. In 2014 new translation of Shiva Sutras into English has been made available along with innovative commentary organized into chapters called cascades.

== See also ==
- Shiva Sutras
- Trika Shaivism

== Bibliography ==
- Kshemaraja (1911). The Shiva Sutra Vimarshini: Being the Sutras of Vasu Gupta with the Commentary Called Vimarshini.
