= Maria Gomori =

Canadian family therapist (1920–2021)

- Born: May 25, 1920; Budapest, Hungary
- Died: December 10, 2021 (aged 101); Winnipeg, Manitoba, Canada
- Citizenship: Canadian
- Education: Sorbonne (BA University of Manitoba (MSW) Haven Institute (PhD)
- Occupations: Therapist, professor
- Known for: Training programs at St. Boniface Hospital, Winnipeg

Maria Gomori (May 25, 1920 – December 10, 2021) was a Hungarian-born Canadian pioneer in the field of systems family therapy. She contributed to the fields of psychiatric and social work training, and designed numerous training programs. She was a proponent of the Satir Method for Family Therapy. In 2004, she was named "Woman of Distinction" for the field of Health and Wellness by the City of Winnipeg. In the same year Winnipeg's Saint Boniface Hospital Research Centre established a lectureship in her name to honour her long and varied contributions to the health system and the people who use it.

== Life and career ==
She earned a B.A. at the Sorbonne, an Economics degree in her native Budapest, an M.S.W. at the University of Manitoba, Dip.C. from the Haven Institute and Ph.D. from the Open International University. Gomori developed the family therapy training program for the residents in psychiatry at St. Boniface Hospital in Winnipeg, MB, and was the Coordinator and Director of the Social Work Department at this hospital for 14 years. In her retirement, she continued to lecture and offer seminars and workshops around the world, teaching annually in China and Taiwan and North America, even at the age of 88. She collaborated with Bennet Wong and Jock McKeen for over thirty years, and was an Emeritus Faculty of the Haven Institute.

After enduring the Nazi incursion in her native Budapest in the 1940s, she completed her education and rose quickly in the Hungarian Government's department of Economics. She fled Hungary with her husband and young son in 1956 in the midst of the Hungarian Revolution without money or possessions. They moved to Winnipeg, Manitoba, Canada, where she studied social work. Her life focus was on freedom. She received numerous honours and citations.

Gomori was a family therapist in private practice, and an Associate Professor in the Department of Psychiatry at the University of Manitoba's Faculty of Medicine. Gomori was also a Clinical Member and Approved Supervisor with AAMFT, the American Association of Marriage and Family Therapy. She worked intensively with Virginia Satir for over 20 years and was a faculty member and advanced trainer in Satir's Avanta International Training Organization from 1981. Gomori was also a certified practitioner and Master Programmer in Neuro-linguistic programming.

She died in Winnipeg on December 10, 2021, at the age of 101.

== Contributions ==
Gomori established an international reputation as a workshop leader, teaching, demonstrating and applying her interpretation of the Satir model. She conducted workshops throughout Canada, the United States, Europe, South America, Thailand, Hong Kong, Taiwan, China and Australia. She co-authored with Virginia Satir et al. The Satir Approach to Communication and The Satir Model: Family Therapy and Beyond; the latter book was chosen by the AAMFT Foundation for the 1994 Satir Education and Research Prize. Gomori worked tirelessly in her international lectures and seminars, and was instrumental in establishing Satir Institutes in Winnipeg, Hong Kong, Taiwan, and Australia. She integrated Virginia Satir's approach with her learnings from other teachers combined with her own experiences.

Maria's life is a testimony to the principles addressed by existential philosophies: freedom, authenticity, responsibility, and moral agency. With balance and courage, she also accepts the inevitable challenges of angst, loneliness, and paralysing uncertainties. Her mind is alive with ideas, concepts, and novel perspectives on human beings.

— Bennet Wong & Jock McKeen

== Publications ==
- Gomori, Maria and Adaskin, Eleanor. "Desperately Seeking French Fries: A Case Example of Satir's Family Sculpting", Issaquah, WA: Anchor Point, March 1993, pp. 11–16.
- Gomori, Maria, Baldwin, M., Gerber, J. and Schwab, J. (1990). The Satir Approach to Communication, Palo Alto, CA: Science and Behavior Books. ISBN
- Satir, Virginia; Banmen, John; Gerber, Jane; & Gomori, Maria. (1991). The Satir Model, Palo Alto, CA: Science and Behavior Books. ISBN 0-8314-0078-1
- Gomori, Maria. "Integrating Satir and PD Concepts", Gabriola Island, BC: Shen, Issue #22, Fall 1998.
- Gomori, Maria and Adaskin, Eleanor. (2000). "Finding Freedom, a chapter in Virginia Satir: Her Life and Circle of Influence, Palo Alto, CA: Science and Behavior Books. ISBN 0-8314-0087-0
- Gomori, Maria. (2001). Meeting the Self: A Family Reconstruction (5 Videos), Taipei, Taiwan: Shiuh Li Liuh Foundation.
- Gomori, Maria. (2002). Passion For Freedom, Palo Alto, CA: Science and Behavior Books. ISBN 0-8314-0090-0
- Gomori, Maria. (2004). Passion For Freedom (Chinese Translation), Taipei, Taiwan: Living Psychology Publishers. ISBN 957-693-581-4
- Gomori, Maria, with Adaskin, E. (2008). Personal Alchemy: The Art of Satir Family Reconstruction, Hong Kong: Satir Center for Human Development. ISBN 978-988-17-8691-3

== Notes ==
=== References ===
- Family Therapy News, Staff Writer (October 1994), "Satir Education and Research Prize", Family Therapy News, Alexandria, VA, p. 14.
- Usher, David (July 25, 2002), "Launch of Passion For Freedom: Maria's Story", Winnipeg Free Press, Winnipeg, MB, p. 8.
- Winnipeg Free Press, Staff Writer (July 26, 2002), "Launch of Passion For Freedom: Maria's Story", Winnipeg Free Press, Winnipeg, MB, p. D1.
- Wong, B.R.; McKeen, J. (2002), "Foreword", in Gomori, Maria (ed.), Passion For Freedom, Palo Alto, CA: Science and Behavior Books (published 2001), pp. xi–xv, ISBN 0-8314-0090-0.
- Winnipeg Free Press, Staff Writer (Apr 23, 2003), "Forty-Two Winnipeg Women", Winnipeg Free Press, Winnipeg, MB, p. B5.
- Binning, Cheryl (May 2, 2003), "Award-Winners Flying High on Special Night", Winnipeg Free Press, Winnipeg, MB, p. A3.
- Vesely, Carolin (May 3, 2003), "Ladies First", Winnipeg Free Press, Winnipeg, MB, p. B3.
- Vesely, Carolin (February 26, 2004), "Internet Intimacy a Myth, Say Relationship Experts", Winnipeg Free Press, Winnipeg, MB, p. D8.
- Marshall, Edward (August 19, 2005), "She Walks the Talk When It Comes to Relating to Others", Triangle Business Journal, Chapel Hill, NC.
- Marshall, Edward (Spring 2006), "Lessons in Courage from Maria Gomori", Shen, Gabriola Island, BC, pp. 1–2.
