= Zen Flesh, Zen Bones =

1957 publication by Paul Reps

Zen Flesh, Zen Bones is a 1957 publication by Paul Reps combining four separate texts on nondual practice:

- 101 Zen Stories
- The Gateless Gate (Mumonkan)
- Ten Bulls
- Centering (Vigyan Bhairav Tantra)

== Contents ==
=== 101 Zen Stories ===
101 Zen Stories is a 1919 compilation of Zen koans including 19th and early 20th century anecdotes compiled by Nyogen Senzaki, and a translation of Shasekishū, written in the 13th century by Japanese Zen master Mujū (無住) (literally, "non-dweller"). The book was reprinted by Paul Reps as part of Zen Flesh, Zen Bones. Well-known koans in the collection include A Cup of Tea (1), The Sound of One Hand (21), No Water, No Moon (29), and Everything is Best (31).

=== Gateless Gate ===
The Gateless Gate (Mandarin: 無門關 Wúménguān; Japanese: 無門関 Mumonkan), more accurately translated as The Gateless Barrier, is a collection of 48 Chan (Zen) koans compiled in the early 13th century by the Chinese Zen master Wumen Huikai (無門慧開; Japanese: Mumon Ekai; 1183–1260). Wumen's preface indicates that the volume was published in 1228. Each koan is accompanied by a commentary and verse by Wumen.

=== Ten Bulls ===
Ten Bulls or Ten Ox Herding Pictures (十牛; Japanese: jūgyū, Chinese: shíniú) is a series of short poems and accompanying pictures used in the Zen tradition to illustrate the stages of a practitioner's progression towards the purification of the mind and enlightenment, (Note: 廓庵《十牛圖頌》考：從牧牛圖頌談起) as well as his or her subsequent return into the world while acting out of wisdom.

An equivalent series of stages is depicted in the Nine Stages of Tranquility, used in the Mahamudra tradition, in which the mind is represented by an elephant and a monkey. (Note: Skyflower Dharmacenter, Mahamudra Tranquility and Insight) This formulation originates with Asaṅga (4th CE), delineating the nine mental abidings in his Abhidharmasamuccaya and the Śrāvakabhūmi chapter of his Yogācārabhūmi-śāstra. It is also found in the Mahāyānasūtrālaṅkāra of Maitreyanātha, which shows considerable similarity in arrangement and content to the Bodhisattva-bhūmi-śāstra. (Note: Piya Tan gives a full description of these stages; see Piya Tan (2004), The Taming of the Bull. Mind-training and the formation of Buddhist traditions, dharmafarer.org) The Dharma Fellowship', a Kagyu (Mahamudra) organisation, notes that the practice starts with studying and pondering the dharma, where-after the practice of meditation commences.

=== Vigyan Bhairav Tantra ===
The Vigyan Bhairav Tantra is a chapter from the Rudrayamala Tantra. It was introduced to the west by Paul Reps, a student of Lakshman Joo. Reps brought the text to wider attention by including an English translation in his popular book Zen Flesh, Zen Bones. Cast as a discourse between the god Shiva and his consort Devi or Shakti, it briefly presents 112 meditation methods or centering techniques (dharanas).

== See also ==
- Aldous Huxley
