= Robert Giller =

American doctor (1942–1996)

- Born: Robert Maynard Giller; September 14, 1942; Chicago, Illinois, U.S.
- Died: October 19, 1996 (aged 54); Manahawkin, New Jersey
- Education: University of Illinois (BS); University of Illinois College of Medicine (MD)
- Occupations: Physician; acupuncturist; nutritionist; writer

Robert Maynard Giller (September 14, 1942 – October 19, 1996) was an American physician, acupuncturist, nutritionist, and author. He specialized in preventive medicine and became known for his public advocacy concerning diet, weight loss, nutrition, vitamins, and the relationship between stress and physical health. His books included Medical Makeover (1986), Maximum Metabolism (1989), and Natural Prescriptions (1995).

== Early life and education ==
Robert Maynard Giller was born in Chicago, Illinois, on September 14, 1942, to Edward M. Giller and Lillian Giller (née Katz), later Lillian Kolbe. He attended the University of Illinois from 1960 to 1963 and received his Doctor of Medicine degree from the University of Illinois College of Medicine in 1967. He subsequently undertook postgraduate study at Columbia University and New York Hospital-Cornell Medical Center.

== Career ==
Following medical school, Giller completed a residency in internal medicine at Cornell University Hospital from 1968 to 1969. He subsequently served two years in the United States Army Medical Corps as a resident preventative medical officer. He then worked as a medical staff member at Putnam Memorial Hospital in Bennington, Vermont.

In 1972, he began studying at the College of Chinese Acupuncture in Kenilworth, England, where he studied under British acupuncturist J. R. Worsley. He had first become interested in acupuncture through his own reading and underwent acupuncture treatment himself while studying in England, describing it as painless. Giller believed acupuncture had potential applications in anesthesia, pain relief, and the treatment of illness, and advocated integrating it into Western medicine. Giller studied acupuncture in Hong Kong for six months and became licensed to practice it in the United States.

In 1974, Giller established a private medical practice in New York City, specializing in preventive medicine. He was associated with New York Hospital-Cornell Medical Center and later became a member of its faculty.

In 1975, Giller joined the faculty of the New School for Social Research. He was also associated with the American College of Preventive Medicine, the International Academy of Preventive Medicine, and the American Academy of Family Physicians, and was a member of the American Medical Association.

By 1976, Giller was head of the Acupuncture Therapy Unit at the Brunswick Hospital Center in Amityville on Long Island. He also had a private acupuncture practice in Manhattan.

Giller's approach to health emphasized the effects of stress on the body and the use of diet, vitamins, and minerals as components of preventive health. His practice attracted performers, athletes, and celebrities, including fashion designer Halston, actress Bianca Jagger, actors George Hamilton, Liza Minnelli, and Carrie Fishers, singer Judy Collins, and ballet dancer Mikhail Baryshnikov. Baryshnikov used Giller's vitamin supplements to support his dancing, while basketball player Kareem Abdul-Jabbar sought treatment from Giller for migraines.

He became particularly associated with weight-loss programs that sought to address metabolism and stress rather than relying solely on willpower.

== Works ==
Giller wrote extensively for a popular audience on diet, nutrition, and preventive health. He co-authored three books with Kathy Matthews. Their first, Medical Makeover: The Revolutionary No-Willpower Program for Lifetime Health (Beech Tree/Morrow, 1986), was on the New York Times Best Seller list for nine weeks. They followed with Maximum Metabolism: The Diet Breakthrough for Permanent Weight Loss (Berkeley, 1989), which presented his approach to weight reduction and metabolism. Their third book, Natural Prescriptions: Dr. Giller's Natural Treatments & Vitamin Therapies for Over 100 Common Ailments (Ballantine, 1995), presented dietary, vitamin, and other natural-treatment approaches to a range of common health complaints.

== Personal life ==
By the late 1970s, Giller ahd became part of Halston's social circle, which included Pop artist Andy Warhol and Studio 54 co-owner Steve Rubell. Giller was known for treating Halston and his celebrity friends with acupuncture, vitamin injections, and diet advice. In September 1978, Halston hosted a birthday party for Giller at his home, where the cake was inscribed "Dr. Feelgood." He also gave Giller a black straw Halston hat decorated with a band of $10 bills, one of which was signed by Warhol, which became a distinctive objet d'art. Giller is pictured wearing the hat in the 1979 book Andy Warhol's Exposures. In 1981, Warhol painted Giller's portrait.

Giller and his wife Nancy Lee Giller, a television producer, lived on the Upper East Side of Manhattan and in East Hampton, New York. He previously lived in Hoosick, New York.

== Death ==
Giller died at the age of 54 in a car accident on the Garden State Parkway in Manahawkin, New Jersey, on October 19, 1996. He was killed instantly when the vehicle, in which he was a passenger, spun out of control during a gale-force rainstorm. The driver, an employee of Giller's wife's business and the vehicle's only other occupant, was uninjured. He was survived by his wife, Nancy Lee Giller, and his mother, Lillian Kolbe, and brother, Michael.
