= Kashmir Shaivism =

Nondualist Kashmiri Hindu tradition

The trident (triśūlābija maṇḍalam) symbol and yantra of Parama Shiva, representing the triadic energies of the supreme goddess Parā, Parā-aparā and Aparā śakti.

Kashmir Shaivism is a 19th-century (Note: The term Kashmir Shaivism was popularized by a 19th-century Bengali scholar, Pandit Gangadhara Kaviratna. He coined the term for the Trika corpus—a naming that shaped how the tradition is known today.) umbrella-term for a body of Sanskrit exegetical literature (Note: Wallis (2013): "... the second phase, the exegetical writings of the Śaiva Tantrik masters from Kashmīr. It is this body of literature that has been called “Kashmīr Shaivism” since the early 20th century and taught in the West under that name but entirely disassociated from the full context of Śaiva Tantra and its scriptures) of non-dual Shaiva-Shakta tantric and monistic religious traditions from Kashmir, "principally the Trika and the Krama," both subschools of the Kaula-tradition. This exegetical tradition developed in Kashmir after 850 CE, as an adaptation to upper-class Hindu norms of 'wild' tantric Kaula traditions, replacing Shaiva Siddhanta as the dominant form of Saivism. It includes the Spanda ('Divine vibration') teachings, and the "Philosophy of Recognition" (Pratyabhijñā) of the Kashmir Trika-school. The term "Kashmir Shaivism" is often used synonymously for the Kashmir Trika-school and its pratyabhijñā philosophy.

The Shiva Sutras of Vasugupta (9th c. CE) and the Spanda Karika (9th c. CE) are the central texts of the Spanda system, interpreting Shakti as spanda, "cosmic pulsation" or "divine vibration", the active and creative energy of Shiva.

Defining features of the Trika tradition are the use of several triads in its philosophy, including the three goddesses Parā, Parāparā, and Aparā; and its idealistic and monistic teaching of pratyabhijna ("direct knowledge of one's self," "recognition") philosophical system, propounded by Utpaladeva (c. 925–975 CE) and Abhinavagupta (c. 975–1025 CE). The main exegetical works of the Trika-tradition are those of Abhinavagupta, such as the Tantraloka, Mālinīślokavārttika, and Tantrasāra. Another important text of this tradition is the Vijñāna-bhairava-tantra, which focuses on outlining numerous yogic practices. Trika Shaivism later spread beyond Kashmir, particularly flourishing in the states of Odisha and Maharashtra.

== Nomenclature ==
Kashmir Shaivism is an umbrella term for several non-dual Shaiva-Shakta tantric religious traditions that flourished in Kashmir after 850 CE, as an adaptation to upper-class Hindu norms of 'wild' tantric Kaula traditions, and include the spanda ('Divine vibration') teachings, and the "Philosophy of Recognition" (Pratyabhijñā) of the Trika-school. The term Kashmir Shaivism was popularized by a 19th-century Bengali scholar, Pandit Gangadhara Kaviratna. He coined the term for the Trika corpus—a naming that shaped how the tradition is known today. As such, Kashmir Shaivism is often used synonymously for the Trika-school and it's "Philosophy of Recognition" (pratyabhijñā). Trika, named after the use of several triades (trika) in its philosophy, was a subdivision of the Kaula-tradition, probably originated outside Kashmir before 800 CE, but the pratyabhijñā developed in Kashmir.

Alexis Sanderson has argued that the expression "Kashmir Śaivism" is inadequate and misleading when it is used to designate the non-dualist current alone, since in Abhinavagupta's time the dualist Śaiva Siddhānta, which later developed in South India, was an essential element of Śaivism in Kashmir.

== History ==
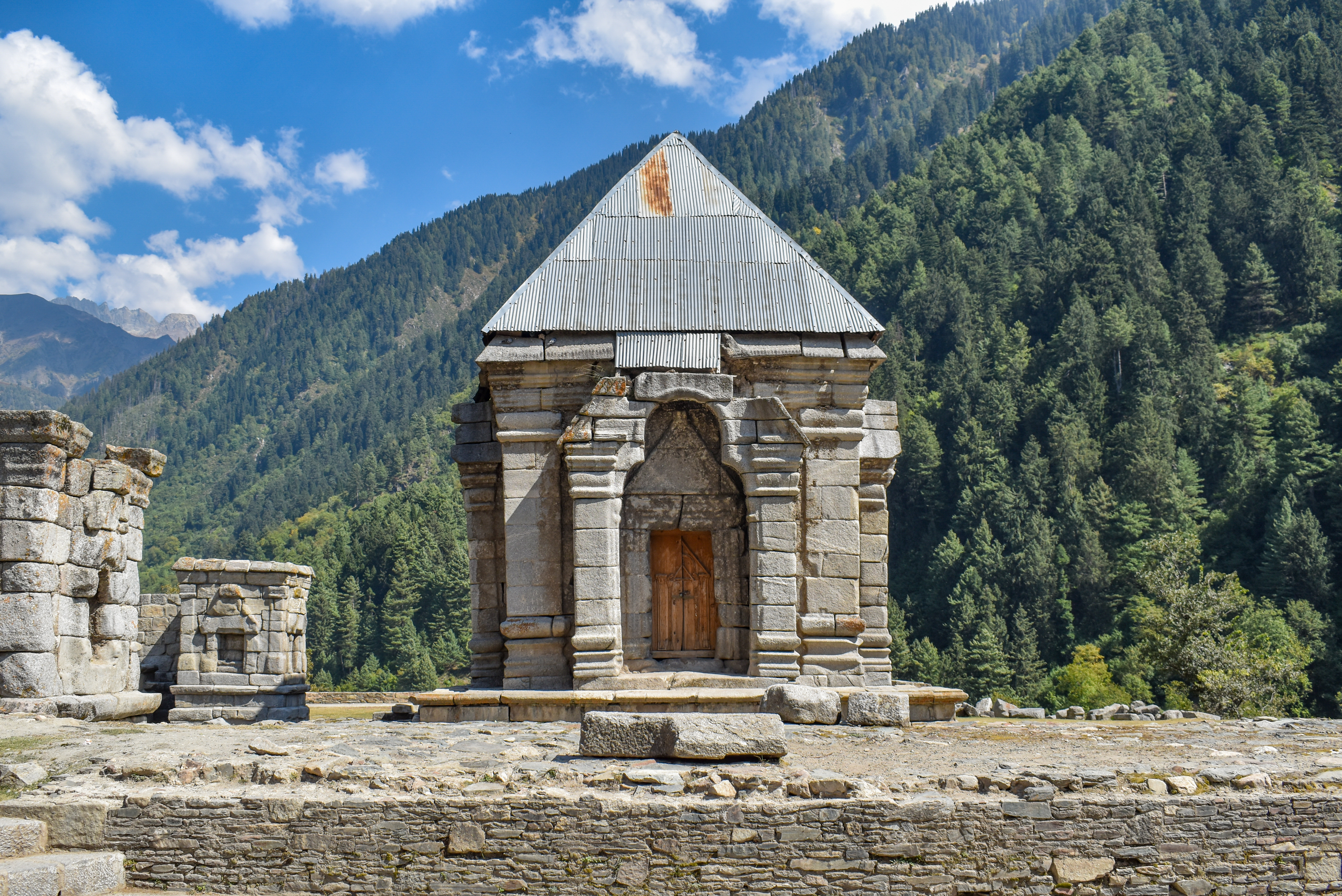
c. 8th century CE Shaivite Temple complex at Wangath in the Himalayas of Kashmir

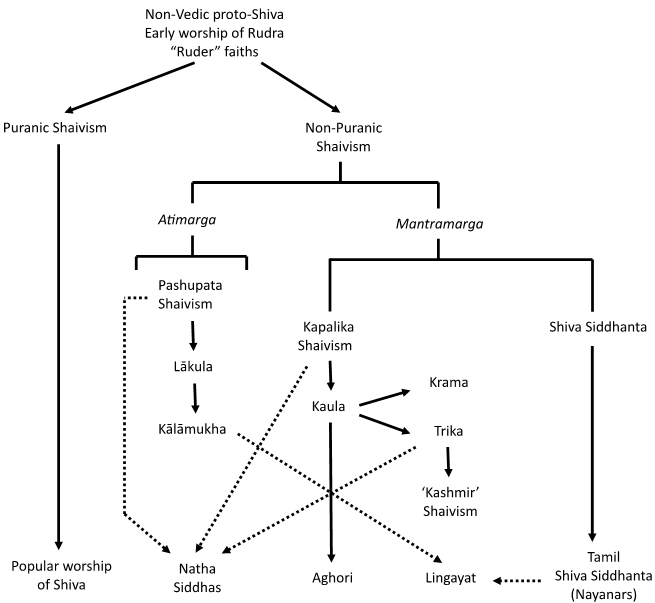
The development of various schools of Shaivism from early worship of Rudra.

=== Origins (9th century CE) ===
Kashmir Shaivism originated in Kashmir after 850 CE, as a domestication of Kaula tantric movements, adapting its views and practices to normative upper-caste Hinduism. As Lawrence notes, " Radical practices were toned down, concealed under the guise of propriety, or interpreted as metaphors of internal contemplations."

One result of this domestication-process was the composition, by monistic Saivite Brahmins, of "increasingly systematic manuals of doctrines and practices on the model of Sanskrit scholastic texts (shāstras). This textual development began with the Shiva Sutras of Vasugupta (9th cent. CE) and the Spandakārikā (9th cent. CE), which are the central texts of the Spanda system, interpreting Shakti as spanda, "cosmic pulsation" or "divine vibraction", the active and creative energy of Shiva.

The Shiva Sutras appeared to Vasugupta in a dream, according to tradition. The Spandakārikā was either composed by Vasugupta (c. 800-850 CE) or his student Bhatta Kallata (9th cent. CE). These were a Śākta Śaiva attempt to present a non-dualistic metaphysics and gnostic soteriology, in opposition to the dualistic exegesis of the Meykandar school of Shaiva Siddhanta, while remaining in agreement with the monistic view expressed in the older and arguably more authoritative Tirumantiram of Tirumular.

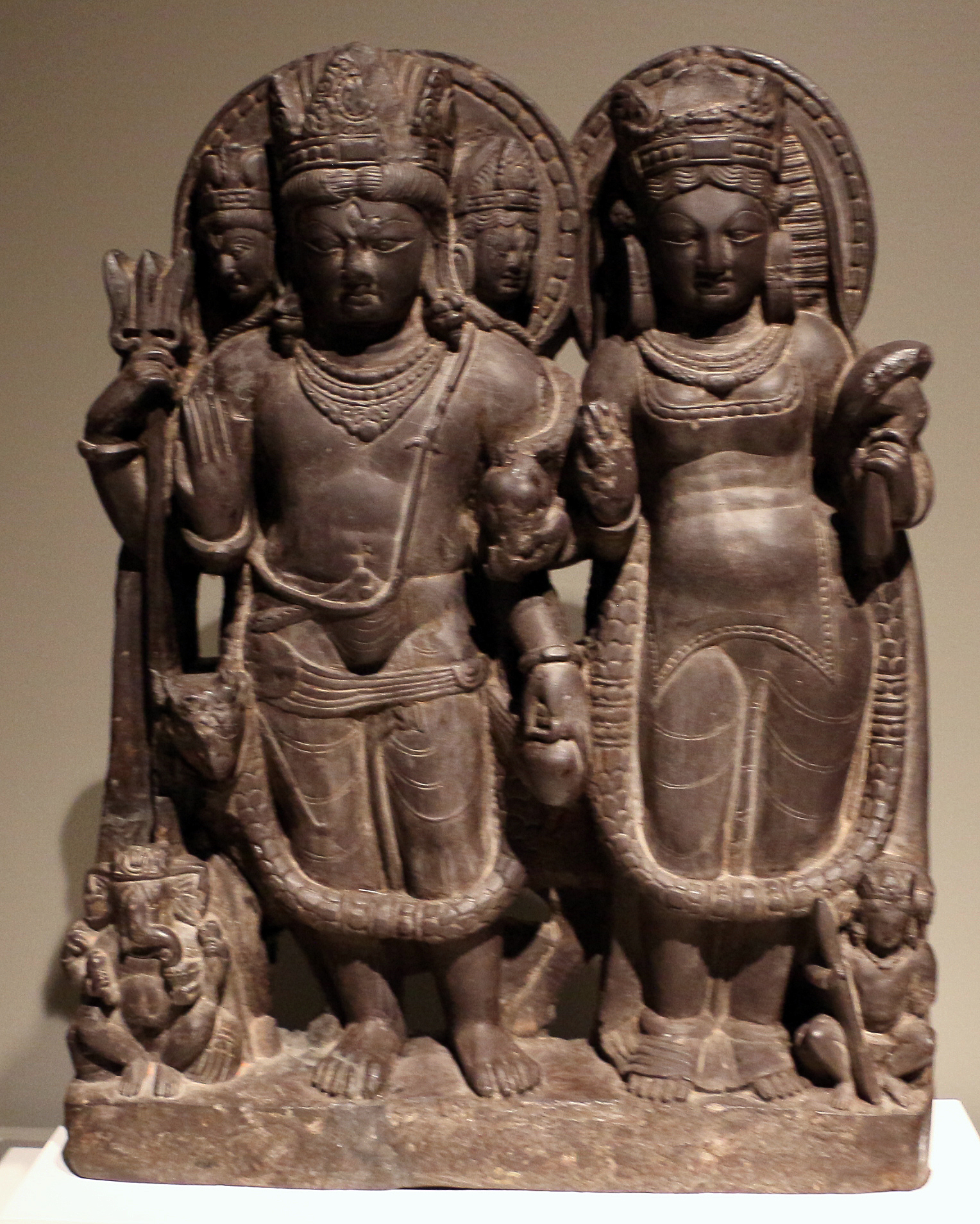
Shiva and Parvati (which is associated with Shakti), Kashmir, 10 or 11th century.

=== Growth and flowering (900–1200 CE) ===
While Trika draws from numerous Shaiva texts, such as the Shaiva Agamas and the Shaiva and Shakta Tantras, its major scriptural authorities are the Mālinīvijayottara Tantra, the Siddhayogeśvarīmata and the Anāmaka-tantra. The main theologians of Trika Shaivism are those of the Pratyabhijñā (Recognition) school of Shaiva non-dual philosophy.

Somānanda (875-925) wrote the Śivadr̥ṣṭi, "the first work of full-fledged scholastic philosophy" of the Trika school. Utpaladeva (c. 900–950 CE) and Abhinavagupta (c. 950–1016, a student of one of Utpaladeva's disciples) developed the Pratyabhijñā-system into its mature form. Utpaladeva's Īśvarapratyabhijñā-kārikā (Verses on the Recognition of the Lord) is one of the main works of this tradition, but was overshadowed by the work of Abhinavagupta. Thus, according to Torella, "Abhinavagupta's Īśvarapratyabhijñā-Vimarśinī and the Īśvarapratyabhijñā-Vivr̥ti-Vimarśinī (a commentary on Utpaladeva’s Vivr̥ti on his own Īśvarapratyabhijñā-Kārikā and Vr̥tti) are generally considered the standard works of the Pratyabhijñā." Torella notes however, that "most of Abhinavagupta’s ideas are just the development of what Utpaladeva had already expounded."

Abhinavagupta was initiated in the sampradayas (lineages) of the Trika, Pratyabhijñā, the Kaula Krama, and Shaiva Siddhantha, and also self-studied that spanda-system. Abhinavagupta wrote numerous other works on Shaiva tantra. His Tantrāloka, Mālinīślokavārttika, and Tantrasāra are mainly based on the Mālinīvijayottara Tantra, although they also drew heavily on the Kali-based Krama tradition of the Kulamārga. Abhinavagupta's Tantrāloka is probably his most important work. According to Christopher Wallis, "the Tantrāloka is a monumental explication of Tantrik practice and philosophy in over 5,800 verses. It is encyclopedic in its scope though not organized like an encyclopedia, for instead of just enumerating theories and practices, it brings them all into a coherent framework in which everything has its place and everything makes sense in relation to the whole."

One of Abhinavagupta's students, Kshemaraja, is also an important figure who authored the influential commentaries on Shivasūtra (Śivasūtravimarśinī), Spandakārikā (Spandanirṇaya), and Svacchandatantra as well as the short Pratyabhijñāhṛdayam (The Essence of Self-Recognition).

Jayaratha (1150–1200 CE) wrote a commentary on the Tantrāloka.

=== Decline (1200 CE – 19th century) ===
After 1200 CE, the institutional basis and support for the Shaiva and Buddhist Tantric tradition mostly disappeared with Islamic conquests of the region leading to the slow decline and contraction of the tradition, though especially the Kaula-influenced lineages continued to be passed down and practiced by wandering ascetics well into the 18th century, due to their non-institutionalized structure.

In the 14th century, Islam gradually became the dominant religion in Kashmir. With the fall of Kashmir, a premier center of Sanskrit literary creativity, Sanskrit literature there disappeared. Islamic preacher Sheikh Nooruddin Noorani, who is traditionally revered by Hindus as Nund Rishi, combined elements of Kashmir Shaivism with Sufi mysticism in his discourses which further eroded the independence of Kashmir Shaivism.

The number of major writers and publications declined after approximately the 14th century, although writers such as Rājānaka Ānanda Kavi, Anantaśaktipāda, Śivopādhyāya, Bhāskarakaṇṭha, Rājānaka Lakṣmīrāma, and Harabhaṭṭa Śāstri continued to produce important commentaries on core Kashmiri Shaiva texts into the early 20th century.

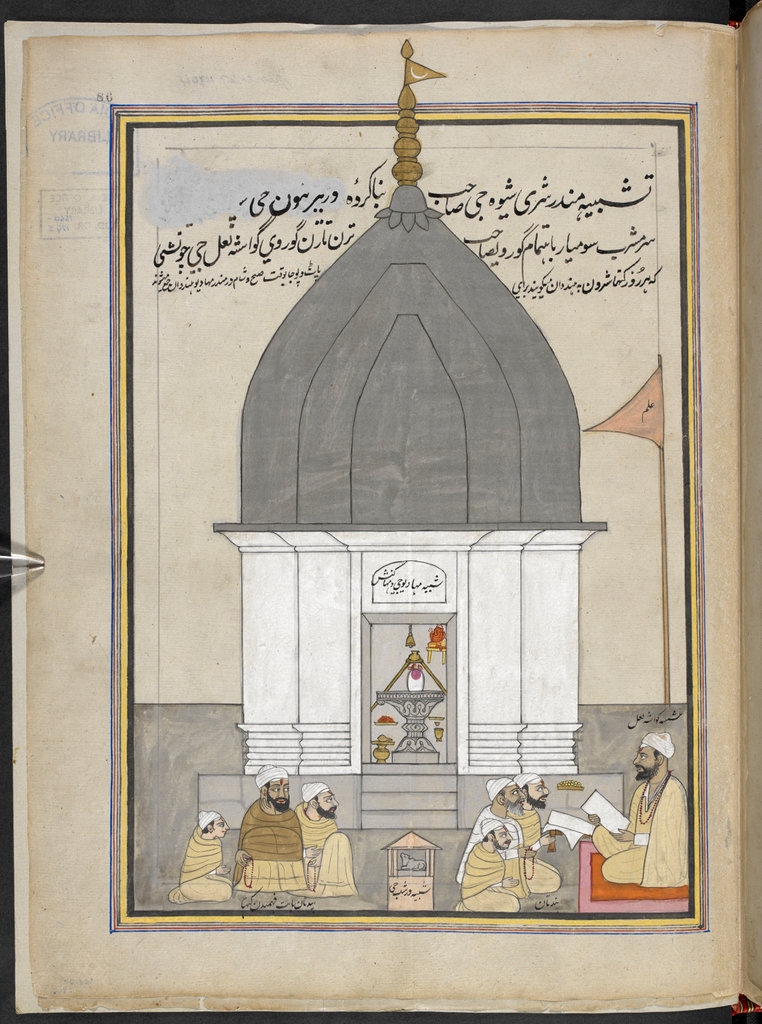
Painting of a priest and worshippers at a Shiva temple in Srinagar, Kashmir, circa 1850–1860

=== Revival (19th century – present) ===
The term Kashmir Shaivism was popularized by a 19th-century Bengali scholar, Pandit Gangadhara Kaviratna. He coined the term for the Trika corpus—a naming that shaped how the tradition is known today.

In the 20th century Lakshman Joo, a Kashmiri Hindu, helped revive both the scholarly and yogic streams of Kashmir Shaivism. His contribution is enormous. He inspired a generation of scholars who made Kashmir Shaivism a legitimate field of inquiry within the academy.

Acharya Rameshwar Jha, is often credited with establishing the roots of Kashmir Shaivism in the learned community of Varanasi. Rameshwar Jha with his creativity, familiarity with the ancient texts and personal experiences provided access to concepts of non-dualistic Kashmir Shaivism. His writings of Sanskrit verses have been published as the books Purnta Pratyabhijna and Samit Swatantram.

Lilian Silburn (1908–1993) was a French Indologist specialising in Kashmir Shaivism, Tantra and Buddhism. Working together with Louis Renou, she translated from Sanskrit and published the core scriptures of Kashmir Shaivism, including Shiva Sutras of Vasugupta, Vijnana Bhairava Tantra, and others, many being first-ever translations of the recently discovered texts. Silburn, a student of Lakshman Joo, authored Kundalini: The Energy of the Depths, A Comprehensive Study Based on the Scriptures of Kasmir Saivism (Shaiva Traditions of Kashmir, State University of New York Press, 1988).

Swami Muktananda, although not belonging to the direct lineage of Kashmir Shaivism, felt an affinity for the teachings, validated by his own direct experience. He encouraged Motilal Banarsidass to publish Jaideva Singh's translations of Shiva Sutras, Pratyabhijnahrdayam, Spanda Karikas and Vijnana Bhairava, all of which Singh studied in-depth with Lakshman Joo. He also introduced Kashmir Shaivism to a wide audience of western meditators through his writings and lectures on the subject.

The Vijnana Bhairava Tantra, a chapter from the Rudrayamala Tantra, was introduced to the West by Paul Reps, a student of Lakshman Joo, by including an English translation in his book Zen Flesh, Zen Bones. Cast as a discourse between the god Shiva and his consort Devi or Shakti, it presents 112 meditation methods or centering techniques (dharanas).

The four key Trika mandalas from Abhinavagupta’s Tantrāloka, previously considered indecipherable, were translated, decoded and illustrated by Christian de Vietri in his 2024 book titled Trika Maṇḍala Prakāśa.

== Texts ==
In general, the whole written tradition of Kashmir Shaivism can be divided in three fundamental parts: Āgama Śāstra, Spanda Śāstra and Pratyabhijñā Śāstra.

1. Āgama Śāstra are those writings that are considered as being a direct revelation from Siva. These writings were first communicated orally, from the master to the worthy disciple. They include essential works such as Mālinīvijaya Tantra, Svacchanda Tantra, Vijñāna Bhairava Tantra, Netra Tantra, Mṛgendra Tantra, Rudrayāmala Tantra, Śivasūtra (Shiva Sutra of Vasugupta) and others. There are also numerous commentaries to these works, Śivasūtra having most of them.
2. Spanda Śāstra, the main work of which is Spanda Kārikā of Bhatta Kallata, a disciple of Vasugupta, with its many commentaries. Out of them, two are of major importance: Spanda Sandoha (this commentary talks only about the first verses of Spanda Kārikā), and Spanda Nirṇaya (which is a commentary of the complete text).
3. Pratyabhijñā Śāstra are those writings which have mainly a metaphysical content. Due to their extremely high spiritual and intellectual level, this part of the written tradition of Shaivism is the least accessible for the uninitiated. Nevertheless, this corpus of writings refers to the simplest and most direct modality of spiritual realization. Pratyabhijñā means "recognition" and refers to the spontaneous recognition of the divine nature hidden in each human being (atman). The most important works in this category are: Īśvara Pratyabhijñā, the fundamental work of Utpaladeva, and Pratyabhijñā Vimarśinī, a commentary to Īśvara Pratyabhijñā. Īśvara Pratyabhijñā means in fact the direct recognition of the Lord (Īśvara) as identical to one's Heart. Before Utpaladeva, his master Somānanda wrote Śiva Dṛṣṭi (The Vision of Siva), a devotional poem written on multiple levels of meaning.

According to Mark S. G. Dyczkowski, Kashmiri Trika Shaivism looks to three scriptures "as its primary authorities", the Mālinīvijayottara Tantra, the Siddhayogeśvarīmata and the Anāmaka-tantra.

As a monistic tantric system, Trika Shaivism, as it is also known, draws teachings from shrutis, such as the monistic Bhairava Tantras, Shiva Sutras of Vasugupta, and also a unique version of the Bhagavad Gītā which has a commentary by Abhinavagupta, known as the Gitartha Samgraha. Teachings are also drawn from the Tantrāloka of Abhinavagupta, prominent among a vast body of smritis employed by Kashmir Shaivism.

== Spanda-philosophy ==
The spanda-philosophy regards consciousness as active and dynamic, described as the spontaneous vibration or pulsation (spanda) of universal consciousness, which is an expression of its freedom (svātāntrya) and power (Śakti). Because of this, though this philosophy is idealist, it affirms the reality of the world and everyday life, as a real transformation (parinama), manifestation or appearance (ābhāsa) of the absolute consciousness. Whilst Somananda, an early proponent of spanda-philosophy, was unaware of Advaita Vedanta directly, he was aware of Vedanta arguments in which the world is not considered to be real, and refuted such arguments directly in his works. Through the notion of spanda, Kashmiri Saiva philosophers maintain that reality is 'one and undivided' which 'changes and yet remains eternally itself'.

The Absolute is also explained through the metaphor of light (prakasha) and reflective awareness (vimarsha).

== Trika- and Pratyabhijna-philosophy ==
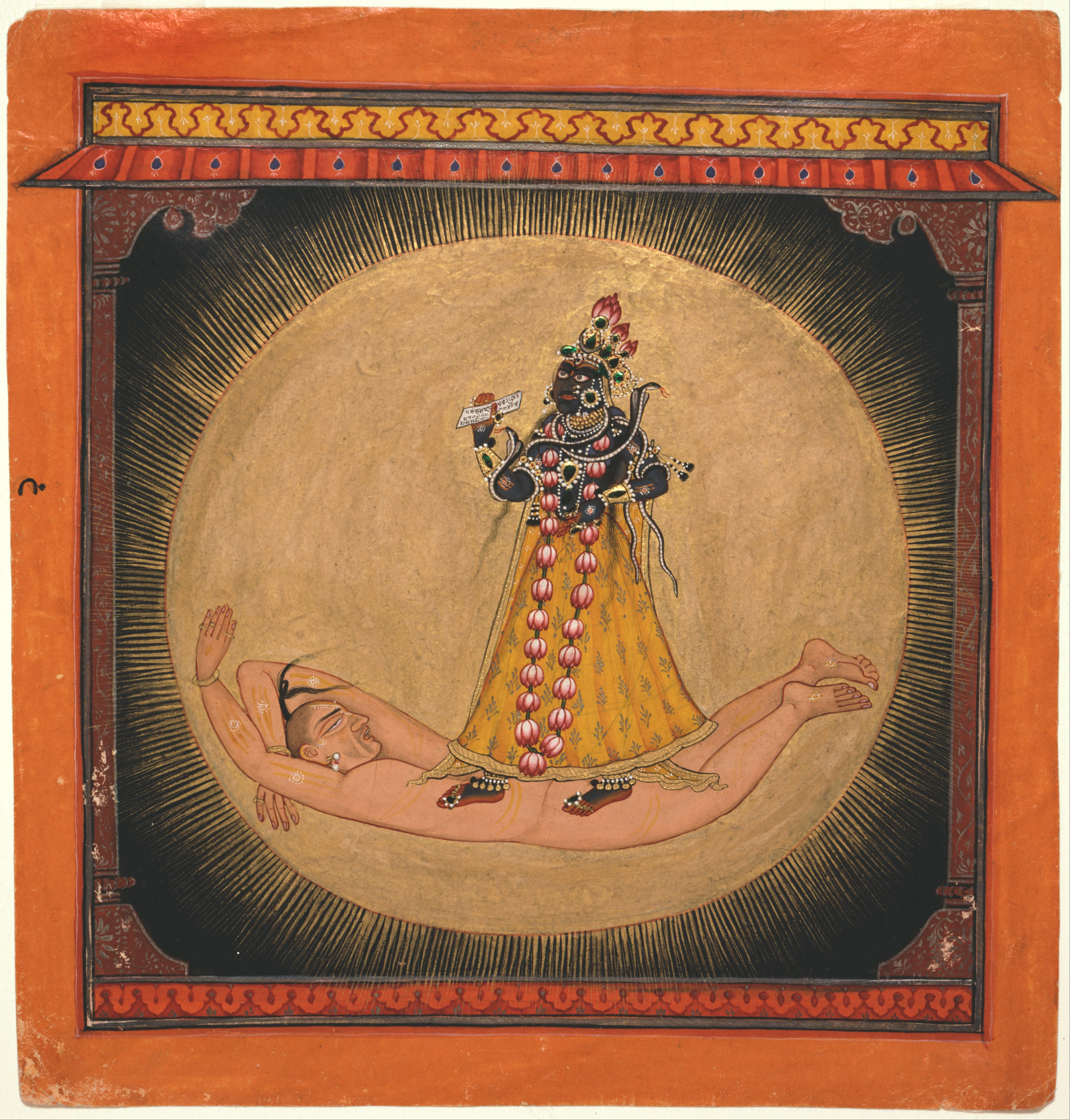
A painting of goddess Kali from Jammu and Kashmir, c. 1660–1670, from a Tantric Devi series attributed to Kripal of Nurpur (active c. 1660 – c. 1690). Philadelphia Museum of Art

=== Triads (trika) ===
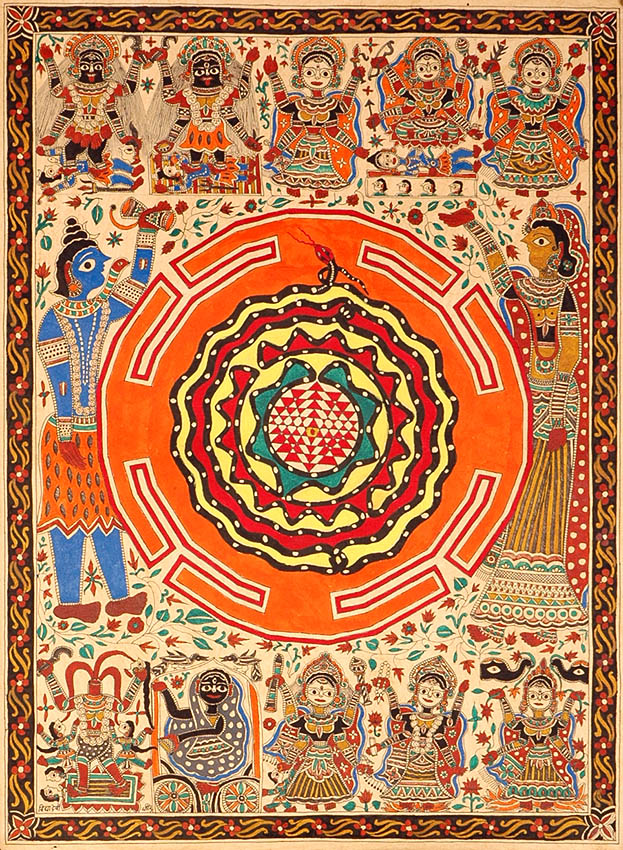
Sri Yantra diagram with the Ten Mahavidyas. The triangles represent Shiva and Shakti, the snake represents Spanda and Kundalini.

An important element of Trika Shaivism's theology is the use of several triads (symbolized by the trident) in its description of Absolute and phenomenal reality, hence the name trika.

=== Pratyabhijna—One consciousness Being unfolds as the multiplicity of the world ===
Central to Trika Shaivism is Pratyabhijñā, "recognition." Etymologically, pratyabhijñā is formed from prati- ("re-") + abhi- ("closely") + *jñā ("to know"), so the meaning is "direct knowledge of one's self," "recognition."

The central thesis of this philosophy is that everything is a manifestation or unfolding of absolute consciousness, termed Śiva, and it is possible to "re-cognise" this fundamental reality and be freed from limitations, identified with Śiva and immersed in bliss. Thus, the slave (paśu: the human condition) shakes off the fetters (pāśa) and becomes the master (pati: the divine condition).

Pratyabhijna, the 'philosophy of recognition', as outlined by thinkers like Utpaladeva, teaches that though the identity of all souls is one with God (Isvara) or Shiva (which is the single reality, Being and absolute consciousness), they have forgotten this due to Maya or ignorance. However, through knowledge one can recognize one's authentic divine nature and become a liberated being.

The basic theology of Trika's Recognition school, as summarised by Utpaladeva in Īśvarapratyabhijñā-Kārikā (Verses on the Recognition of the Lord), is as follows:

There is only one Great Divinity, and it is the very inner Self of all creatures. It embodies itself as all things, full of unbroken awareness of three kinds: “I”, “this”, and “I am this.”

The school's theology is expressed by Kshemaraja in his Pratyabhijñā-hṛdayam (The Heart of Recognition) as follows:

Awareness, free and independent, is the cause of the performance of everything. She unfolds the universe through Her own will and on Her own canvas. It becomes diverse by its division into mutually adapting subjects and objects. The individual conscious being, as a condensation of universal Awareness, embodies the entire universe in a microcosmic form.

== Kali ==
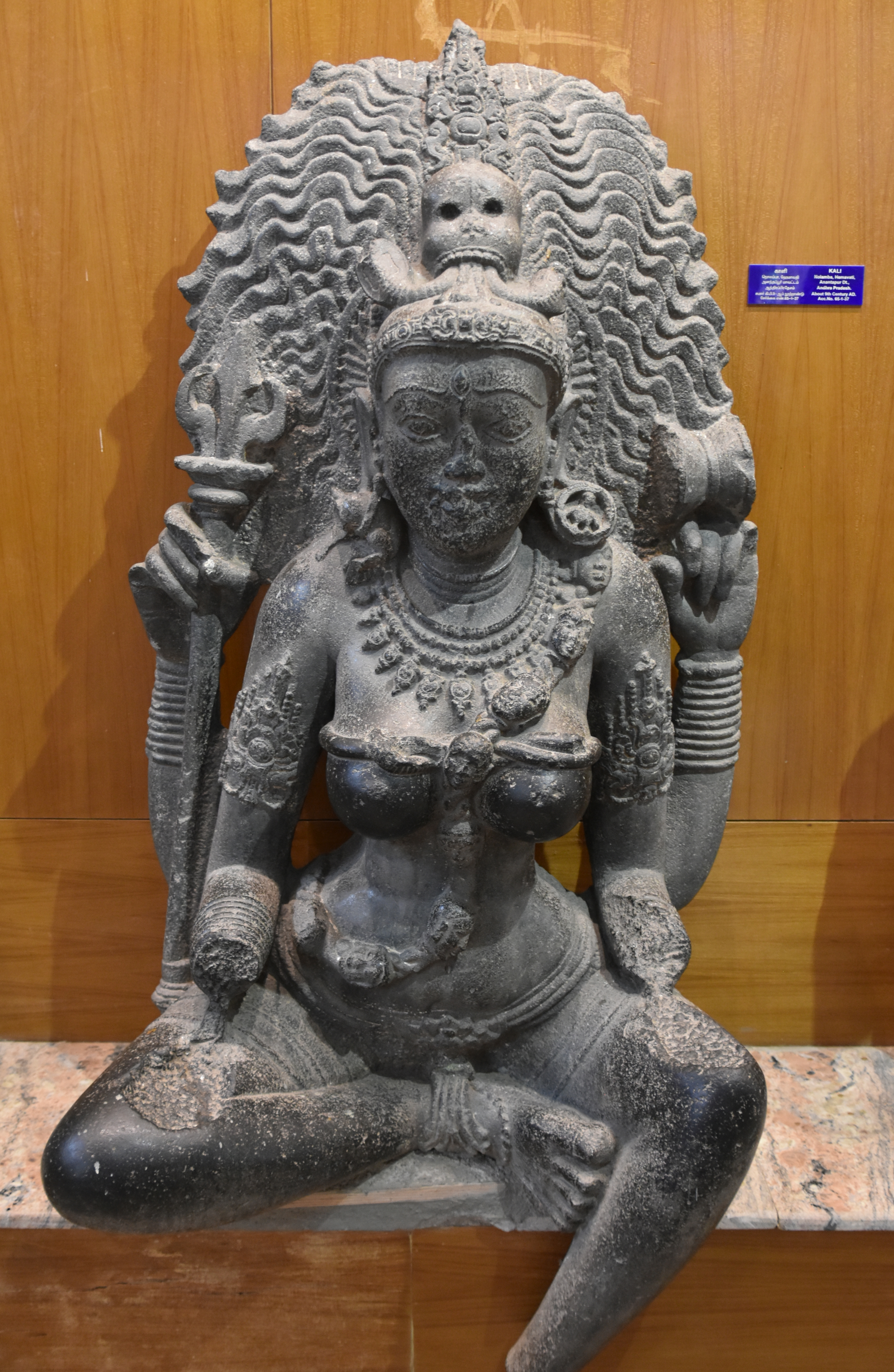
Kali, c. 9th century, from Andhra Pradesh. The Trika synthesis of Abhinavagupta also adopted the doctrines of the Krama school of Shakta Tantra, whose main goddess was Kali.

In Kashmir Shivaism the highest form of Kali is Kalasankarshini who is nirguna, formless and is often show as a flame above the head of Guhya Kali the highest gross form of Kali. In Nepali Newar arts, both form and formless attributes of Kali is often envisioned in a single art form showing the hierarchy of goddesses in their tradition. In it Guhyakali image culminates in flame, with Kalasankarshini, the highest deity in the sequence, who consumes time within herself and is envisioned solely as a flame representing Para Brahman. Sthaneshwara Timalsina argues that Tantric art portrays various forms of Kali, with Guhya Kali as the 'deity of esoteric-time' and Kama Kali as 'all aspects of desire'.

== Relation with other traditions ==
=== Shaiva Siddhanta ===
Shaiva Siddhanta was a northern, especially Kashmi development. While Kashmir Shaivism developed in opposition to the dualistic Shaiva Siddhanta tradition, it shares many parallel points of agreement with the lesser-known monistic school of Shaiva Siddhanta as expressed in the Tirumantiram of Tirumular. It shares this branch's disagreements with the dualistic Shaiva Siddhanta school of Meykandar, which scholars consider to be normative tantric Shaivism.

=== Shaktism ===
The doctrines of Kashmir Shaivism were very influential on the Shri Vidya tradition of Shaktism.

=== Comparison with Advaita Vedanta ===
Kashmir Shaivism and Advaita Vedanta are both non-dual philosophies that recognize Universal Consciousness (Chit or Brahman), but have different views on the relation between this highest Reality and the phenomenal world. In Advaita Vedanta, only this consciousness (Brahman) is ultimately Real, whereas the phenomenal world is considered to be Maya, illusion, creating a fundamental ontological problem. In Kashmir Shaivism, all things are a manifestation of this Consciousness, and the phenomenal world (Śakti) is real, existing and having its being in Consciousness (Chit).

Advaita Vedanta tradition in medieval times was influenced by, and incorporated elements from, the yogic tradition and texts like the Yoga Vasistha and the Bhagavata Purana. The Yoga Vasistha became an authoritative source text in the Advaita Vedanta tradition in the 14th century, while Vidyāraņya's Jivanmuktiviveka (14th century) was influenced by the (Laghu-) Yoga-Vasistha, which in turn was influenced by Kashmir Shaivism.

Jaideva Singh lists seven key differences between Advaita and Kashmir Shaivism, where in Kashmir Shaivism

1. the absolute is active, rather than passive
2. the world is a real appearance, rather than false (mithyā)
3. grace (anugraha) has a soteriological role
4. the ātman is present in the human body in dynamic form (spaṇda), rather than as a pure witness (sākṣī)
5. the methods include all four upāyas, rather than solely emphasizing Śāmbhavopāya, 'the method of consciousness'
6. ignorance (avidyā) is uprooted at both intellectual (bauddha) and personal (paurusha) levels, rather than just the intellectual level
7. liberation (muktī) is not an isolation from the world (kaivalya) but an integration into world which appears as Shiva

== See also ==
- Bhagwan Gopinath
- Lalleshwari
- Swami Lakshman Joo

== Sources ==
- Bose, Sumantra (2005), Kashmir: Roots of Conflict Paths To Peace, Harvard University Press, ISBN 978-0-674-02855-5
- Brooks, Douglas Renfrew (1992). Auspicious wisdom: the texts and traditions of Srīvidyā Sākta Tantrism in South India. SUNY series in tantric studies. Albany, NY: State Univ. of New York Press. pp. 38–43. ISBN 978-0-7914-1146-9.
- Dyczkowski, Mark S. G. (1989). The Doctrine of Vibration: An Analysis of the Doctrines and Practices of Kashmir Shaivism. Motilal Banarsidass Publ.
- Flood, Gavin (1996), An Introduction to Hinduism, Cambridge: Cambridge University Press, ISBN 0-521-43878-0
- Flood, Gavin (2006). The Tantric Body.
- Ganapathy, T.N. (2004). The Yoga of Tirumular: essays on the Tirumandiram.
- Kapoor, S. The Philosophy of Saivism. Vol. 1.
- Lawrence, David Peter. "Kashmiri Shaiva Philosophy". Internet Encyclopedia of Philosophy.
- Muller-Ortega, Paul E. (1989). The Triadic Heart of Siva: Kaula Tantricism of Abhinavagupta in the Non-dual Shaivism of Kashmir. SUNY Press.
- Olson, Carl (2007). The Many Colors of Hinduism. Rutgers University Press.
- Parmeshwaranand (2004). Encyclopaedia of the Śaivism. Sarup & Sons. ISBN 978-81-7625-427-4.
- Sanderson, Alexis (1988). "Saivism and the Tantric Tradition". In Clarke, Peter (ed.). The World's Religions. Routledge.
- Ratié, Isabelle (2011). Le Soi et l'Autre: Identité, différence et altérité dans la philosophie de la Pratyabhijñā. Jerusalem Studies in Religion and Culture (in French). Vol. 13. Leiden: Brill. ISBN 978-90-04-20344-0.Sanderson, Alexis (2005a), "Saivism:Saivism in Kasmir", in Jones, Lindsay (ed.), MacMillan Encyclopedia of Religion. Vol.12: Rnying Ma Pa School - Soul, MacMillan
- Sanderson, Alexis (2005e), "Saivism: Krama Saivism", in Jones, Lindsay (ed.), MacMillan Encyclopedia of Religion. Vol.12: Rnying Ma Pa School - Soul, MacMillan
- Sanderson, Alexis (2009). "The Hinduism of Kashmir" (PDF). Archived from the original (PDF) on 2 October 2015.
- Sanderson, Alexis (2014). "The Śaiva Literature" (PDF). Journal of Indological Studies (Kyoto), Nos. 24 & 25 (2012–2013), 2014, pp. 52-53. Archived from the original (PDF) on 4 March 2016.
- Singh, Jaideva (1982). Pratyabhijñāhrdayam. ISBN 8120803221.
- Torella (2021). "Nondualistic Saivism of Kashmir". In Goetz, Stewart; Taliaferro, Charles (eds.). The Encyclopedia of Philosophy of Religion, 4 Volume Set. Wiley.
- Wallis, Christopher (2013). Tantra Illuminated, Part II, A History of Śaiva Tantra. Mattamayura Press.
