= Silburn =

Silburn is a surname. Notable people with the surname include:

- Elaine Silburn (1928–2022), Canadian long and triple jumper
- Lilian Silburn (1908–1993), French Indologist

== Fictional characters ==
- Joshua Silburn Jr., a character in the television series The Messengers
