= Bhaskara (Kashmiri) =

Bhaskara was a notable writer from the Kashmir Shaivism sect of Hinduism. He wrote an important commentary, the Varttika, on the Shiva Sutras of Vasugupta. According to Dyczkowski, "We know nothing about him except that he was the son of one Divakarabhatta and was, therefore, like the other Kashmiri Saiva authors, a Brahmin by caste, as Bhatta was a title bestowed to learned Brahmins in Kashmir at that time" (p. 2).
