= Gurtu =

Gurtu is an Indian surname. Notable people with the surname include:

- Atul Gurtu (born 1946), Indian physicist
- Nilkanth Gurtu (1925–2008), Sanskrit teacher
- Shobha Gurtu (1925–2004), Indian singer
- Trilok Gurtu (born 1951), Indian percussionist and composer
