= Nilkanth Gurtu =

Sanskrit and Shaiva scholar

Nilkanth Gurtoo (1925–2008) was a Kashmiri Sanskrit & Shaiva scholar and professor who translated many philosophical texts into Hindi or English.

== Early life and education ==
Nilkanth Gurtoo was born in Srinagar, Kashmir, India on 2 January 1925. He learned advanced texts of Sanskrit grammar and linguistics from Pandit Lalkak Langoo, Pandit Harbhatta Shastri and Pandit Sarvadananda Handoo, Pandit Maheshwar Nath Nehru and Pandit Jankinath Dhar. He also qualified for the traditional degrees of Prajna, Visharada and Shastri in Sanskrit from Government Sanskrit College, Srinagar (affiliated with the University of Punjab in Lahore). After qualifying for the Prabhakar degree, he earned a B.A. degree in Sanskrit. He learned the nuances of Kashmir Shaivism from Professor Balajinnath Pandit and Swami Lakshman Joo.

== Career ==
Gurtu initially worked as a Sanskrit teacher in the Government Sanskrit School in Tral, Kashmir, and simultaneously he also earned a degree of M.A. in Sanskrit. He then earned an M.A. degree in Hindi as well. He was associated with the Jammu & Kashmir Research and Publication Department of the Government of Jammu & Kashmir, Government Souer College & Amar Singh College, Srinagar (under the University of Kashmir).

== Death ==
Professor Gurtu died on 18 December 2008, from Alzheimer's disease.

== Selected works ==
- Paratrisikavivarana with Hindi translation and commentary, Motilal Banarsidass, New Delhi. (1985).
- Spandakarika with Kallata's vrtti translated into Hindi with commentary, Motilal Banarsidass, New Delhi. (1981).
- Harsesvaramahatmayam translated into English with detailed annotations, Penman Publishers, Delhi. (2000).
- Parmarthasara with Hindi translation of Yogaraja's commentary with an elaborate introduction, Penman Publishers, Delhi. (2004).
- Sambapancasika with Ksemaraja's commentary translated into Hindi, Penman Publishers, Delhi. (2002)
- Sivastotravali of Utpaladeva with Ksemaraja's commentary and Hindi translation by Swami Lakshman Joo. Edited by Nilkanth Gurtoo, Ishwar Ashram Trust, Srinagar (Kashmir).
- Parapravesika of Ksemaraja explained into Kashmiri and edited by Makhanlal Kukiloo, Ishwar Ashram Trust, Srinagar, Kashmir. (1996).
- Kashmira-saiva-darsana-brhat-kosa (in two volumes) (edited jointly with Prof Yashpal Khajuriya and Prof Balajinnath Pandit). Rashtriya Sanskrit Sansthan, Jammu (J&K). (2001-2005).
