= Take Your Choice =

Canadian game show

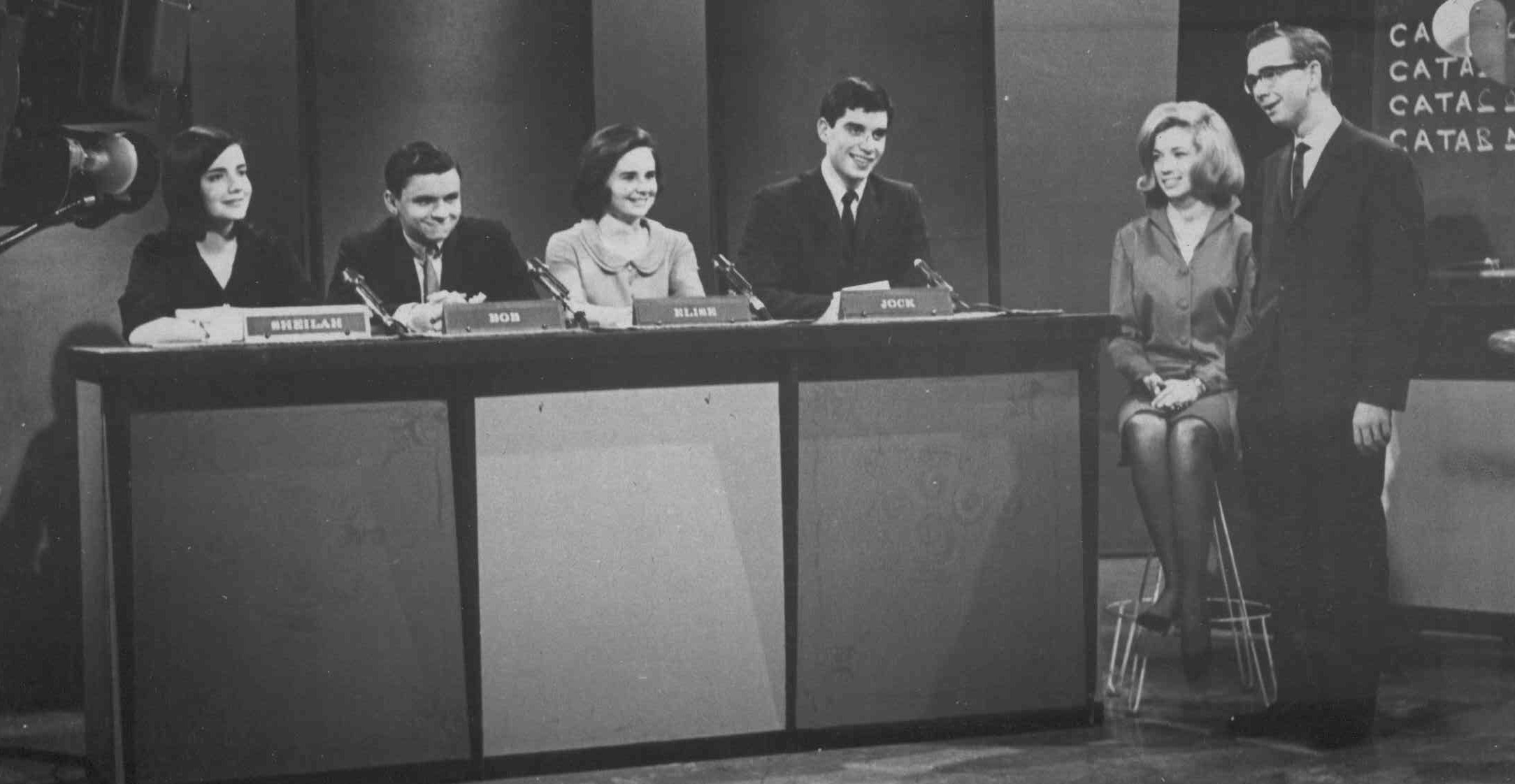
Sheilah White, Bob Wood, Dale Ingrey, Elise Jenkins, Jock McKeen, Linda Greenwood, Dave Wilson

Take Your Choice is a Canadian game show which aired from 1960 to 1971 on CFPL-TV in London, Ontario, Canada. The regular panelists included Sheilah White, Bob Wood, Elise Jenkins, Jock McKeen, Linda Greenwood, Chris Reinhart, Dale Ingrey and Cory Bieman. The originating producer was John Phillips. The series was originally hosted by Paul Soles, who was replaced in the second year by Dave Wilson, and hosted the program for many years.

The panel members first appeared when they were high school students; they continued in their regular spots into their university years. Thus, they grew up witnessed by their viewing audience, who felt an involvement with them and their developing careers.

The program had a decidedly local appeal in the city of London, and the surrounding communities in southwestern Ontario. A local organization or church group or charity would constitute the live audience as the show of the week was being taped. The audience would appoint several of their number to match wits with the panel to respond to questions of a wide-ranging nature, on various topics. The group would take home their winnings when they were successful in their challenges to the panelist.
