= Haven Institute (Gabriola Island, Canada) =

Learning facility in British Columbia, Canada

Haven Institute, or The Haven is a centre for transformative learning situated on Gabriola Island in the Gulf Islands of British Columbia on the west coast of Canada. Founded by Jock McKeen and Bennet Wong, the centre offers programs for personal and professional purposes, including Certificate and Diploma Programs in Group Facilitation and Counselling Skills.

== Institutional registration and credits ==
The Haven Institute is registered in the province of British Columbia as a Private Training institution in accordance with the Private Training Act (SBC 2015) Chapter 5. This registration is governed by the Private Training Institutions Branch (PTIB) of the Ministry of Advanced Education, Skills and Training.

== History ==
In 1983, two physicians, Bennet Wong and Jock McKeen purchased the Taylor Bay Lodge on Gabriola Island, British Columbia, and transformed it into a waterfront resort and conference centre. They called it "a resort with a difference" because people could enter into the activities at whatever level they chose. Some people came with their families to enjoy a country resort; groups and agencies held conferences; others attended the numerous residential self-awareness seminars. Still others returned for training in counseling; currently, 95 people have graduated from the Diploma program offered by The Haven Institute.

There are over fifty visiting faculty members teaching in this nontraditional, open atmosphere. Some notable ones have been Virginia Satir, Erv and Miriam Polster, Paul Reps, Carl Whitaker, Paul Lowe, James Bugental, Thomas Szasz, Bill O'Hanlon, Maria Gomori and Joanna Macy. The Haven Symposium has featured Joseph Chilton Pearce, Margaret Wheatley, and Dan Millman. The Wong-McKeen Phoenix Auditorium, Haven's performing arts theatre, has seen performances by Ann Mortifee, Laurie Anderson, Eric Bibb, Victor Wooten, Shari Ulrich and Leon Bibb. The Haven Institute Press publishes books by founders Bennet Wong and Jock McKeen and others.

The Core Programs for the Institute were developed by McKeen and Wong. Programs have been offered at The Haven with Chinese translation since the early 1990s, and numerous Asian people have attended as participants, and trainees. Joann Peterson became the Director of Education in 1992, and oversaw the training of over 1200 interns and assistants in group and individual counselling until her death in 2007. The programs have continued to develop and broaden.

In 2003, The Haven Foundation was established as a federally recognized Canadian nonprofit charity. In 2004, Wong and McKeen and their three sons, transferred the ownership of The Haven Institute into the Haven Foundation so that the facility and their work could continue in perpetuity under independent guidance., In 2008 The Haven Institute celebrated its 25th anniversary. Participants from all over the world continue to attend both the core programs and other programs offered by visiting faculty. The Haven hosted the TEDx Gabriola conference in March 2013.

== Teaching principles ==
The methods in the courses are derived from a great variety of sources in the fields of humanistic psychology and transpersonal psychology, as well as the more traditional fields of psychology, religious studies, drama, music and art. The techniques used cover a broad spectrum, including gestalt, Reichian body approaches, acupuncture, psychodrama, psychosynthesis, role playing, family therapy, fantasy and visualization techniques, video work, theatre games, play therapy and music therapy, all stressing encounter and communication skills. The approaches are educational only, so no therapeutic care is available. However, Haven leaders do claim to be offering both therapy and education depending on the context. There are some lectures and discussion groups, but emphasis is upon heuristic education and experiential learning, in which the person is invited to experience situations in which to learn what is needed.
