= Sravana Borkataky-Varma =

Historian and educator

Sravana Borkataky-Varma is a historian and educator. She is the Instructional Professor in the Department of Comparative Cultural Studies at the University of Houston. She is currently a Fellow at the Center for the Study of World Religions at Harvard Divinity School. She has previously taught at Harvard University, the University of North Carolina Wilmington, the University of Montana and Rice University.

Borkataky-Varma is a historian of South Asian religions specializing in Hindu traditions. She has a master's degree in Buddhist Studies. Her work is largely centered on the Himalayas (mostly Assam) and West Bengal, India, where she focuses on transmissions of goddess esoteric traditions (Śākta Tantra) from a variety of lenses, everything from rituals to gender construction and digital religion. She defines her research methodology as "both-and": A blend of social anthropology "from the outside" with elements of reflexive autoethnography "from the inside."

== Early life and education ==
Sravana Borkataky-Varma was born in Assam, a state in India. She spent her formative years in the states of Odisha, Uttar Pradesh, and Delhi. She underwent a three-stage initiation into the goddess Kāmākhyā lineage at the age of eight, and then at fifteen, she received the fourth stage of consecration (abhiṣeka).

She received a bachelor's degree in English Literature and a master's degree in Buddhist Studies at Delhi University in India. She later earned her PhD from the Department of Religion at Rice University.

== Academic Research ==
Borkataky-Varma specializes in the study of esoteric rituals and gender, with a particular emphasis on their significance within Hindu goddess traditions. She is dedicated to exploring the lived experiences surrounding embodiment. Her academic contributions encompass a variety of related subjects, including both books and journal articles.

Most recently, she co-edited the book "Religious Responses to Pandemics and Crises: Isolation, Survival, and #Covidchaos" with Christian A. Eberhart and Marianne Bjelland Kartzow and the book "Living Folk Religions" with Aaron Michael Ullrey, both of which were published by Routledge in 2023.

In 2022, she explored the world of Śākta Tantra, specifically fertility rituals, with her journal article "From the Fringes to the Center Stage: Hijṛās and Fertility Rituals in Kāmākhyā."

In 2018 she wrote an article for Religions titled "The Dead Speak: A Case Study from the Tiwa Tribe Highlighting the Hybrid World of Śākta Tantra in Assam."

== Bibliography ==
=== Books ===
- Living Folk Religions. edited with Aaron Michael Ullrey (New York,2023) ISBN 9781032190419
- Religious Responses to Pandemics and Crises: Isolation, Survival, and #Covidchaos Edited By Sravana Borkataky-Varma, Christian A. Eberhart, Marianne Bjelland Kartzow (2024) ISBN 9781032281254
- The Serpent's Tale: Kundalini, Yoga, and the History of an Experience Edited By Sravana Borkataky-Varma and Anya Foxen (2025) ISBN 9780231212533
- Embodied Pedagogies in the Study of Religion: Transforming the Classroom Edited By Sravana Borkataky-Varma, Sarabinh Levy-Brightman (2025) ISBN 9781032685298

=== Book chapters and articles ===
- WhatsApp Bagalāmukhī: Experiences Deemed Religious. The Ethnography of Tantra: Textures and Contexts of Living Tantric Traditions, SUNY (2023)
- From the Fringes to the Center Stage: Hijṛās and Fertility Rituals in Kāmākhyā. The Oxford Handbook of Tantric Studies, Oxford University Press (2022)
- Introduction To The Special Issue: Digital Tantra: Introducing A New Research Field. International Journal of Hindu Studies (2022)
- The Yogic Body in Global Transmission. The Handbook of Yoga and Meditation Studies, Routledge (2021)
- Taming Hindu Śakta Tantra on the Internet: Online Pūjās for the Goddess Tripurasundarī. Digital Hinduism, Routledge (2019)
- Introduction To The Special Issue: Out For Blood: Sacrifice, Tantra, And Normative Hinduism. International Journal of Hindu Studies (2019)
- Red: An Ethnographic Study Of Cross-Pollination Between The Vedic And The Tantric. International Journal of Hindu Studies (2019)
- Menstruation: Pollutant to Potent. Hinduism and Tribal Religions (2018)
- The Dead Speak: A Case Study From The Tiwa Tribe Highlighting The Hybrid World Of Śākta Tantra In Assam. International Journal of Hindu Studies (2017)
- The Ancient Elusive Serpent In Modern Times. International Journal of Dharma Studies (2016)
