= Jaideva Singh =

Indian musicologist (1893–1986)

Thakur Jaideva Singh
- Born: 19 September 1893; Shohratgarh, Uttar Pradesh, India
- Died: 27 May 1986 (aged 92); Varanasi, Uttar Pradesh, India

Thakur Jaideva Singh (19 September 1893 (Note: Some sources state 1896) in Shoratgarh, Uttar Pradesh – 27 May 1986 in Banaras) was an Indian musicologist and philosopher. He played a key role in the development of All India Radio where he was chief producer. He was influenced by the Indian musicologist Vishnu Narayan Bhatkhande.

Singh was a scholar in the Kashmir Saivism school of Indian philosophy, a subject he studied for many years with Swami Lakshman Joo in Kashmir. He prepared and published first-ever English and Hindi translations of a number of Shaivite scriptures. Singh was appointed as the Chairman of the Uttar Pradesh Sangeet Natak Akademi in 1973. He received the Padma Bhushan in 1974 for his contributions to music. Thakur Jaideva Singh contributed numerous papers on music. He studied vocal music with Srikrishna Harihirlekar and Nankoo Bhaya Telang; was elected a Fellow of the Sangeet Natak Akademi in 1965; was honoured by Akhil Bharatiya Gandharva Maha Vidyalaya Mandal.

== Selected works ==
- Introduction to Madhyamaka Philosophy, Bharatiya Vidya Prakashan, Varanasi, 1968.
- Pratyabhijnahrdayam: The Secret of Self-Recognition, by Kṣemarāja, translation, Motilal Banarsidass, Delhi, 1977.
- Vijnanabhairava or Divine Consciousness: A Treasury of 112 Types of Yoga, translation, Motilal Banarsidass, Delhi, 1979.
- Siva Sutras: The Yoga of Supreme Identity, by Vasugupta, translation, Motilal Banarsidass, Delhi, 1979.
- Spanda-Karikas: The Divine Creative Pulsation, by Vasugupta, translation, Motilal Banarsidass, Delhi, 1980.
- Para-trisika-Vivarana by Abhinavagupta: The Secret of Tantric Mysticism, by Abhinavagupta, translation, Motilal Banarsidass, Delhi, 1988.
- Los Shiva Sutras: El yoga del reconocimiento de la identidad con el Ser supremo, by Vasugupta, translation into Spanish, Fundación Genesian, Sevilla, 2000.
- Pratyabhijñahridayam. El secreto del autorreconocimiento, by Kṣemarāja, translation into Spanish, Ediciones Maha Yoga, Buenos Aires, 2013.
- Los Shiva Sutras: El yoga del reconocimiento de la identidad con el Ser supremo, by Vasugupta, translation into Spanish, Ediciones Maha Yoga, Buenos Aires, 2023.
