= Vijñāna Bhairava Tantra =

Text in Kashmir Shaivism

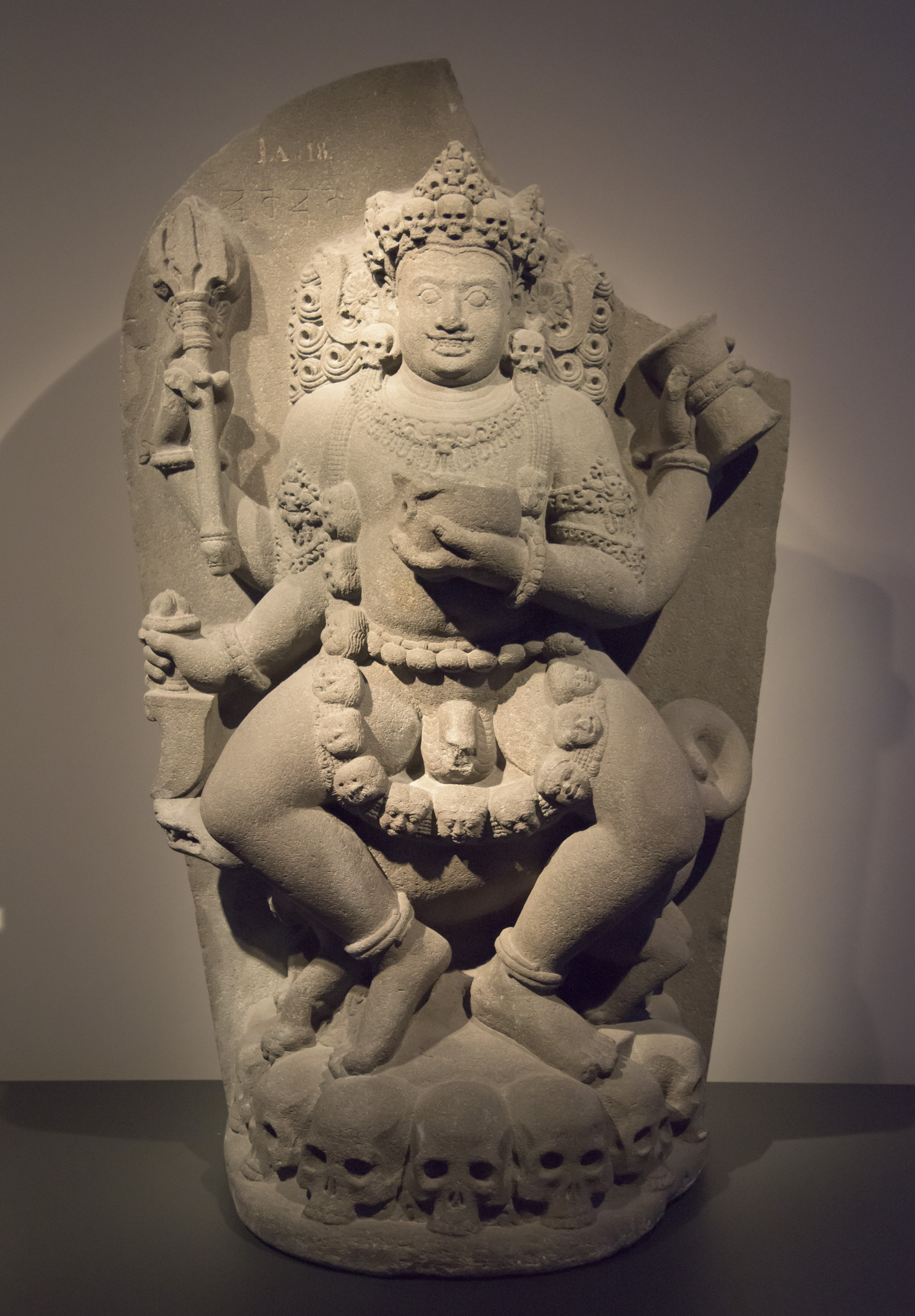
A sculpture of Bhairava (the fearsome one).

The Vijñāna-bhairava-tantra (Sanskrit: विज्ञान भैरव तंत्र) (VBT, sometimes spelled in a Hindicised way as Vigyan Bhairav Tantra) is a Shiva Tantra of the Kaula Trika tradition of Kashmir Shaivism. Singh notes that it is difficult to establish an exact date for the text, and it could have been written at some time from the 7th to the 8th century CE. It is also called the Śiva-jñāna-upaniṣad by Abhinavagupta.

The VBT is framed as a discourse between Bhairava (the "fearsome one", or "the dark matter") and the goddess Bhairavi in 163 Sanskrit anuṣṭubh stanzas. It briefly presents around 112 Tantric meditation methods (yuktis) or centering techniques (dhāraṇās) in very compressed form.

These practices are supposed to lead to the recognition of the true nature of Reality, the "tremendous" or "awesome" consciousness (i.e. vijñāna-bhairava). These include several variants of breath awareness, concentration on various centers in the body, non-dual awareness, mantra practice, visualizations and contemplations which make use of the senses. A prerequisite to success in any of the practices is a clear understanding of which method is most suitable to the practitioner.

== Overview ==
In the Vijñāna-bhairava-tantra (VBT), Bhairavi, the goddess (Shakti), asks Bhairava (the fearsome manifestation of Shiva) who he is, as she sits on his lap. Instead of telling her who he is, Shiva explains how to find the answer through various techniques (tantra). In his answer Bhairava describes 112 ways to enter into the universal and transcendental state of consciousness. References to it appear throughout the literature of Kashmir Shaivism, indicating that it was considered to be an important text in this tradition.

The VBT describes the goal of these practices, the "true nature of reality", as follows in the Christopher Wallis translation from 2018:

Beyond reckoning in space or time; without direction or locality; impossible to represent; ultimately indescribable; Blissful with the experience of that which is inmost; a field of awareness free of mental constructs: that state of overflowing fullness is Bhairavī, the essence of Bhairava. It is that essence which is ultimately real & fundamental; it is that which ought to be known & experienced; it is that which is inherently pure, and it is that which pervades everything.

According to Christopher Wallis, Bhairava and Bhairavi are also used to refer to expanded states of consciousness, with Bhairavi referring more to energetic and active (śakti) states, and Bhairava referring to still and quiescent (śūnya) states. Wallis also notes that the text exhibits a "strong Buddhist influence", and one of the most common meditations taught in the text focuses on the ‘voidness’ (śūnya) of things, such as verse 48 which offers a meditation on the body as empty space, and verses 45 and 49 which teach meditations on the empty space of the heart.

== Practices ==
Most of the VBT's verses are brief compressed descriptions of various practices that allow one to access the state of Bhairava consciousness. Mark Dyczkowski has classified the practices of the VBT into various main types along with the verses in which they appear:

- Practices relying on the Breath: verses 24-27, 55, 64, 154
- Kuṇḍalinī practices: 28-31, 35
- Dvādaśānta (the point twelve finger widths above the head): 50-51, [55]
- Practices focusing on the senses: 32, 36, 67, 77?, 89, 117, 136
- Sound and Mantra practices: 38-42, 90-91, 114
- Void (śūnya): 43-48, [49], 58-60, 120, 122
- Universe (or absence thereof): 53, 56-57, 95
- Body (or absence thereof): 46-48 (overlaps with Void), 52, 54, 63, 65, 93, 104, 107
- Heart/Center (hṛdayam): 49, 61, 62
- Pleasure (kama): 68-74, 96
- Light & Dark: 37, 76, 87, 88
- Sleep & Dream [& Liminal states]: 55, 75, 86
- Practice with the body: 66, 78-79, 81, 82, 83, 111
- Gazing: 80, 84, 85, 113, 119-120
- Equanimity: 100, 103, 123-4, 125-6, 129
- Knowledge/insight: 97-99, 105, 106, 112, 127, 131
- Intense sensations and emotions: 101, 115, 118
- Where the mind goes: 33, 34, 92, 94, 108, 116, 128, [138]
- The ‘magic show’: 102, 133-5, 137
- The Supreme Lord: 109-110, 121, 132

== Commentaries and English translations ==
The text appeared in 1918 in the Kashmir Series of Text and Studies (KSTS). The Kashmir Series published two volumes, one with a commentary in Sanskrit by Kshemaraja and Shivopadhyaya and the other with a commentary, called Kaumadi, by Ananda Bhatta.

In 1957, Paul Reps brought the text to wide attention by including a poetic English translation in his popular book Zen Flesh, Zen Bones.

There is a voluminous commentary by Osho on The Original Text called The Book of Secrets.

As the Sanskritist Christopher Wallis writes, many of English VBT translations have been done by persons who lack training in reading Sanskrit and who lack the background of reading the sanskrit tantric texts that the VBT relies on. The result has been various poetic or free form renderings which fail to properly communicate the actual practices which are briefly outlined in the text. Two exceptions to this are Jaideva Singh's translation and Mark Dyczkowski's translation.

The various VBT translations include the following:

- Satyasangananda Saraswati, Swami (2003). Sri Vijnana Bhairava Tantra : The Ascent (1st ed.). Munger, Bihar: Yoga Publications Trust. ISBN 81-86336-32-X. OCLC 57069102.
- The Manual for Self Realization 112 Meditations of the Vijnana Bhairava Tantra. Lakshmanjoo, Swami., Hughes, John. Lakshmanjoo Academy. 2015. ISBN 9780981622842. OCLC 931644358.
- Vijñāna Bhairava : The Practice of Centring Awareness. Lakshman Joo, Swami, 1907-1991. Varanasi: Indica Books. 2002. ISBN 8186569359. OCLC 52269087.
- Vijñānabhairava, or, Divine Consciousness : A Treasury of 112 Types of Yoga. Sanskrit Text with English Translation, Expository Note, Introduction and Glossary of Technical Terms. Singh, Jaideva. (1st ed.). Delhi: Motilal Banarsidass. 1979. ISBN 8120808207. OCLC 25162962.
- Tantra Yoga: Vijnana Bhairava Tantra, by Daniel Odier
- Chaudhri, Ranjit (2013). 112 Meditations for Self Realization. Fingerprint Publishing. ISBN 978-8172344917. OCLC 922744264.
- Anantananda Giri, Swami (2013). So You Wanna Meditate: A Concise Guidebook With Commentary on the Vijnana Bhairava Tantra. Createspace Independent Publishing. ISBN 9781492761242.
- Roche, Lorin (August 2014). The Radiance Sutras : 112 Gateways to the Yoga of Wonder & Delight. Boulder, Colorado: Sounds True Inc. ISBN 9781604076592. OCLC 852745739.
- Semenov, Dmitri (2010). Vijnanabhairava : or Techniques for Entering Liminal Consciousness. Sattarka Publications. ISBN 9780578060422. OCLC 1027966292.
- The Book of Secrets: 112 Meditations to Discover the Mystery Within by Osho
- Vijnana Bhairava Tantra, by Mike Magee, a commentary on Jaideva Singh's translation
- Karl, Jnani Christian. Handbook of Consciousness: Vijnana Bhairava Meditations. ASIN B00OEI7KKM.
- The 112 Meditations From the Book of Divine Wisdom: The Meditations from the Vijnana Bhairava Tantra, with Commentary and Guided Practice by Lee Lyon
- Vigyan Bhairav Tantra: The Only Great Book of Meditation, Concentration & Self Realisation by Lord Shiva, Mohan Murari, Mohan Kumar
- Vijnana Bhairava Tantra, Insight into reality by Swami Nischalananda
- Vijnana Bhairava Tantra by Satya Narayanan Sarma Rupengunta
- Vijnana Bhairava Tantra by Christopher Wallis.
- Vijnana Bhairava Tantra by Jason Augustus Newcomb
- Varela Romero, Iago (2022), The rebellion of a buddha: and the keys to the ultimate reality, ASIN B0BVSXCXBK

== Sources ==
Printed sources

- Drabu, V. N. (1990), Śaivāgamas: A Study in the Socio-economic Ideas and Institutions of Kashmir (200 B.C. to A.D. 700), Indus Publishing
- Feuerstein, Georg (1998), Tantra: Path of Ecstasy, Shambhala Publications
- Hughes, John (2015), Foreword to Vijnana Bhairava – The Manual for Self Realization
- Muller-Ortega, Paul E. (1989), The Triadic Heart of Siva: Kaula Tantricism of Abhinavagupta in the Non-dual Shaivism of Kashmir, SUNY Press
- Osho (1998), The Book of the Secrets, vols. 1-5, St. Martin's Griffin, ISBN 0-312-18058-6
- Rajneesh, Osho (2010). The Book of Secrets : 112 Meditations to Discover the Mystery Within (1st updated and rev. U.S. ed.). New York: St. Martin's Press. ISBN 9780312650605. OCLC 555656282.
- Reps, Paul (1957), Zen Flesh, Zen Bones, A Collection of Zen and Pre-Zen Writings, ISBN 0-8048-0644-6
- Zen Flesh, Zen Bones : A Collection of Zen and Pre-Zen Writings. Reps, Paul, 1895-1990. London: Penguin Books. 2000. ISBN 0140288325. OCLC 42954648.
- Singh, Jaideva (1979), Vijnanabhairava, Or Divine Consciousness: A Treasury of 112 Types of Yoga, Motilal Banarsidass
- Singh, Jaideva (1991), The Yoga of Delight, Wonder, and Astonishment: A Translation of the Vijnana-bhairava with an Introduction and Notes, SUNY
- Wallis, Christopher 'Hareesh' (2018), Vijñana-bhairava-tantra, A new translation of the 1200 year old classic yoga text
- Varela Romero, Iago (2022), The rebellion of a buddha: and the keys to the ultimate reality, ASIN B0BVSXCXBK

Web-sources
