= Paul Reps =

American poet

- Born: September 15, 1895; Cedar City, Iowa, U.S.
- Died: July 12, 1990 (aged 94); Los Angeles, California, U.S.

Paul Reps (September 15, 1895 – July 12, 1990) was an American artist, poet, and author. He is best known for his unorthodox haiku-inspired poetry that was published from 1939 onwards. He is considered one of America's first haiku poets.

In association with his writing, Reps was also a well-received artist. Many of his books have artwork influenced by Zen Buddhism displayed in association with his writings.

== Life ==
Reps had widely traveled and spent a large amount of his time in Asia. In Japan, his art was widely accepted and he often went there in association with the displays of his artwork in galleries and to reaffirm his Buddhist understanding.

Reps was well-regarded in Japan. When his 2-month visa expired, he applied for a 1-year commercial visa at the consulate in Japan. They said it would take a month, "no exceptions." He returned 3 days later with the needed papers and agreed to wait the month. But he also included a poem:

Drinking a bowl of
green tea
I stop the war.

The visa officer told him to return the next day. He did and was granted a one-year visa with an extension good for 4 years. As Reps commented, "This is what a poem can do for you."

In the later years of his life, Reps made his home on the island of Maui in Hawaii. In the two years before his death, he lived at the Haven Institute (Gabriola Island, Canada) with his friends Jock McKeen and Bennet Wong (McKeen & Wong 1991).

== Works ==
- Zen Flesh, Zen Bones. A Collection of Zen and Pre-Zen Writings (ISBN 0-8048-0644-6). This book includes Zen texts, but also the Vijnana Bhairava Tantra
- Unknot The World In You. His second book, which published through Sequoia University Press
- Zen Telegrams (ISBN 0-8048-2023-6)
- Letters to a friend: Writings & Drawings, 1939 to 1980 (ISBN 0-938286-01-3)
- Gold Fish Signatures (ISBN 0-8048-0210-6)
- Square Sun, Square Moon (ISBN 0-8048-0544-X)
- Sit In: What it is Like (OCLC 8387693)
- Let Good Fortune Jump on You (ISBN 0-9620812-7-2)
- Big Bath: Poems (OCLC 4928654)
- Unwrinkling Plays (ISBN 0-8048-0607-1)
- Ten Ways to Meditate (ISBN 0-8348-0163-9)
- Be! New Uses for the Human Instrument (ISBN 0-8348-0058-6)
- Juicing: Words and Brushwork (ISBN 0-385-13250-6)
