= International Journal of Hindu Studies =

- Discipline: Hindu studies
- Language: English
- Edited by: Sushil Mittal

Publication details
- History: 1997-present
- Publisher: Springer Science+Business Media
- Frequency: Triannually

Standard abbreviations
- ISO 4: Int. J. Hindu Stud.

Indexing
- ISSN: 1022-4556 (print); 1574-9282 (web)
- LCCN: 98659033
- OCLC no.: 629337857

Links
- Journal homepage; Online access

The International Journal of Hindu Studies is a peer-reviewed academic journal published by Springer Science+Business Media. The editor-in-chief is Sushil Mittal (James Madison University). The journal was established in 1997 and appears triannually (except from 2003 to 2005, when it was published once per year, and 2010, when only two issues appeared).

== Scope ==
The journal covers all aspects of Hindu studies ranging from well-established topics to fostering new work in neglected areas. The Journal supports critical inquiries, hermeneutical interpretive proposals, and historical investigations into all aspects of Hindu traditions. Comparative and theoretical articles span a broad range of disciplines in the humanities and social sciences.

== Abstracting and indexing ==
The journal is abstracted and indexed in Scopus, EBSCO databases, Academic OneFile, Arts & Humanities Citation Index, ATLA Religion Database, Humanities Abstracts, Humanities Index, and OmniFile.
