= Shasekishū =

1283 collection of Buddhist parables by Mujū

The Shasekishū (沙石集), also read as Sasekishū, translated into English as Collection of Stone and Sand, is a five-volume collection of Buddhist parables written by the Japanese monk Mujū in 1283 during the Kamakura period.

It is best known in English for an excerpt included in 101 Zen Stories.

The text makes mention of the Yōkai known as the Nozuchi.
