= Mark Dyczkowski =

British Indologist (1951–2025)

Mark S. G. Dyczkowski (29 August 1951 – 2 February 2025) was an English Indologist, musician, and scholar of Tantra and Kashmir Shaivism. He has published multiple translations and commentaries, most notably the 12-volume Manthanabhairava Tantra and an 11-volume Tantrāloka including the commentary by Jayaratha. Dyczkowski also played the sitar and collected over 1,500 compositions for sitar.

== Life and career ==
Mark Dyczkowski was born in London on 29 August 1951 to a Polish father and Italian mother. He discovered India at a young age and was deeply influenced by its cultures and religions. At age fourteen, Dyczkowski read the writings of Vivekananda, Yogananda, and Ramakrishna Paramahansa, along with texts like the Bhagavad Gita and Laṅkāvatāra Sūtra; and started playing the sitar. When he read Walter Evans-Wentz's books The Tibetan Book of the Dead and the Tibetan Yoga and Secret Doctrines, he found them to be too complex to understand and realized the need for a Guru.

After finishing school at the age of 17, Dyczkowski, now 18, traveled to India. He visited Guru Maharaj Ji's ashram in Delhi, which had been established twelve years prior, as recommended by two fellow hotel guests, and remained there for six months. Dyczkoswki went to London to assist Maharaj in his sermons, and stayed there until the Guru suggested he go to college in India. He enrolled in the Banaras Hindu University in 1970 at the age of 19, where his professor was Acharya Rameshwar Jha and a fellow student was K.D. Tripathi. Dyczkowski met Pandit Hemant Chakravarti in Varanasi in 1971. Chakravarti was a student of Gopinath Kaviraj, who in turn was a student of Vishuddhananda Paramahansa and Anandamayi Ma. Dyczkowski studied Sanskrit, philosophy, and Tantra under his guidance, while simultaneously learning the sitar from Budhaditya Mukherjee. Dyczkowski also studied with Vrajvallabh Dwivedi and Pandit Vagish Shastri (who taught him Sanskrit grammar).

By 1974 Dyczkowski had obtained a BA and MA in Indian Philosophy and Religion with distinction from Banaras Hindu University. He returned to England and was admitted to University of Oxford to conduct doctoral research into Kashmir Shaivism. His doctoral advisor was Alexis Sanderson, one of the few scholars in the West who knew of its existence. His supervisor was Richard Gombrich. In 1976, Dyczkowski traveled to Kashmir and was a disciple of Swami Lakshman Joo, with whom Dyczkowski would stay for six months out of the year to attend his lectures on Kashmir Shaivism.

Dyczkowski returned to India in late 1979 after receiving his PhD. He worked towards a second Doctorate at the Banaras Hindu University, where he studied as a Commonwealth Scholar. In 1985 he enrolled at the Sampurnanand Sanskrit Vishwavidyalaya for the Vachaspati (DLitt) degree. He started learning the sitar and Indian classical music from Dr. Gangrade (the head of the music faculty at BHU) and Omir Bhattacharya, and learned vocals from Pashupatinath Mishra. Dyczkowski published his doctoral dissertation, The Doctrine of Vibration as his first book, which introduced many people to Kashmir Shaivism and was reprinted multiple times.

Sanderson gifted two books to Dyczkowski on his wedding. One of these books was the Kubjikāmata, which sparked his curiosity and led him to research the Kubjikā tradition in Nepal, which he would visit once or twice a year. His research was the first such exposition of a secret Tantric tradition and led to multiple other such efforts. Dyczkowski primarily focuses on the Trika, Kaula, Krama, Bhairava, and Siddhānta schools of Tantra, among others. He is also notable for digitizing many previously inaccessible Sanskrit manuscripts and scriptures in association with the Muktabodha Indological Research Institute.

Dyczkowski died in February 2025, at the age of 73.

== Works ==
=== Books ===
- The Doctrine of Vibration: an analysis of the doctrines and practices of Kashmir Shaivism (1987, State University of New York Press, Albany, New York). ISBN 9780887064319, 9780887064326.
- The canon of the Śaivāgama and the Kubjikā Tantras of the western Kaula tradition (1987, State University of New York Press, Albany, New York). ISBN 9780585078458.
- Kubjikā, Kālī, Tripurā, and Trika (2000, Franz Steiner Verlag, Stuttgart & The Nepal Research Centre, Kathmandu). ISBN 9783515077729.
- The cult of the goddess Kubjika: a preliminary comparative textual and anthropological survey of a secret Newar goddess (2001, The Nepal Research Centre, Kathmandu). ISBN 9783515081061.
- A journey in the world of Tantras (2004, Indica Books, Varanasi). ISBN 9788186569429.
- Self Awareness, own being and egoity (1990, DK Book Agencies, Varanasi). OCLC 715632176.

=== Works edited or translated ===
- The stanzas on vibration: the Spandakārikā with four commentaries by Vasugupta (1992, State University of New York Press, Albany, New York). ISBN 9780585078526, 9781438401751.
- The aphorisms of Śiva: the ŚivaSūtra with Bhāskara's commentary, the Vārttika by Vasugupta, Bhāskarabhatta (1992, State University of New York Press, Albany, New York). ISBN 9780791412633, 9780791412640.
- Manthānabhairavatantram Kumārikākhaṇḍaḥ = Section concerning the virgin goddess of the Tantra of the churning Bhairava (2009, Indira Gandhi National Centre for the Arts & D.K. Printworld, New Delhi). ISBN 9788124604984.
- Tantraloka – The Light on and of the Tantras (2023, self-published at Varanasi) by Abhinavagupta. Vol. I: ISBN 9798376139219. Vol. II: ISBN 9798379174637. Vol. III: ISBN 9798379175559. Vol. IV ISBN 9798385705719. Vol. V. ISBN 9798389963894. Vol. VI. ISBN 9798389964495. Vol VII. ISBN 9798396053830. Vol VIII. ISBN 9798397603560. Vol IX. ISBN 9798852285027. Vol X. ISBN 9798852285706. Vol XI. ISBN 9798852286376.
- Tantrasadbhavatantra – on the basis of Nepalese palmleaf manuscripts NAK 5-1985 / NGMPP A42/6 (2005, Muktabodha Indological Research Institute Digital Library).
- Ūrmikaulārṇava – on the basis of NAK MS no: 5-5207 (sic. 5-5202) and NGMPP reel no: B 115/9 (Muktabodha Indological Research Institute Digital Library).
- Ciñcinīmatasārasamuccaya – on the basis of (MS) NAK 1-767; (MS) NAK 1-245; (MS) NAK MS 1-145; (MS) 1-99 (Muktabodha Indological Research Institute Digital Library).
- The Samvitprakasa by Vamanadatta (1990, Ratna Printing Works, Varanasi). OCLC 1146440897.

=== Articles ===
- The Khacakrapañcakastotra, Hymn to the Five Spheres of Emptiness: Introduction, Edition, and Translation in Tantrapuspanjali (2018, pp. 67–131, Indira Gandhi National Centre for the Arts). ISBN 8173055904.
- The doctrines and practices associated with the Kashmiri Śaiva concept of Spanda (PhD Thesis). (1986, British Library, London). OCLC 65016884.
