= Bhatta Kallata =

9th-century Shaivite thinker

Bhatta Kallata also referred as Kallata was a notable 9th-century Kashmiri Shaivite thinker who may have written the Spanda-vritti, and Spanda-karika.

He was a pupil of Vasugupta, another possible author of the Spanda-karika. According to Rajatarangini (The River of Kings) written in 12th-century CE by Kalhana, he lived during the reign of Avanti Varman (855-883 CE).

== Bibliography ==
- Yoga Spandakarika: The Sacred Texts at the Origins of Tantra, by Daniel Odier. Inner Traditions, 2005 ISBN 1594770514.
- Mark S. G. Dyczkowski (1992). The Stanzas on Vibration: The SpandaKarika with Four Commentaries. SUNY Press. pp. 22–. ISBN 978-0-7914-1261-9.
