= Mujū =

Mujū Dōkyō (Japanese: 無住道曉; 1 January 1227 – 9 November 1312), birth name Ichien Dōkyō, was a Buddhist monk of the Japanese Kamakura period. He is superficially considered a Rinzai monk by some due to his compilation of the Shasekishū and similar books of koans, but there is good evidence that he was also an eager student of the Tendai, Pure Land, and Hosso sects, and he is occasionally placed in the Shingon and Ritsu sects as well.

Born into the privileged Kajiwara family, he began his service by becoming a page at Jufuku-ji at the age of 13. He became a priest at the age of 18, in Hitachi Province. He founded Choraku-ji temple in Ueno as well as various other temples, and retired at the age of 80. His most important teacher was Enni, who practiced zazen as well as the engaged study of various traditions.

The only ideology Mujū disapproved of was intolerance, and he "was himself aware of, and intrigued by, the paradox of the position" (Morrell 1985:19). He was disdainful of contemporaries such as Nichiren Shonin who denounced all practices but their own, and he accepted all schools of Buddhism as having a useful teaching, writing in the preface to Shasekishū that "when a man who practices one version of the Way of Buddha vilifies another because it differs from his own sect, he cannot avoid the sin of slandering the Law."

== Writings ==
- Sand and Pebbles (Shasekishū)『沙石集』
- Mirror for Wives (Tsuma Kagami)『妻鏡』
- Casual Digressions (Sōdanshū)『雑談集』
