= Jock McKeen =

Canadian physician (born 1946)

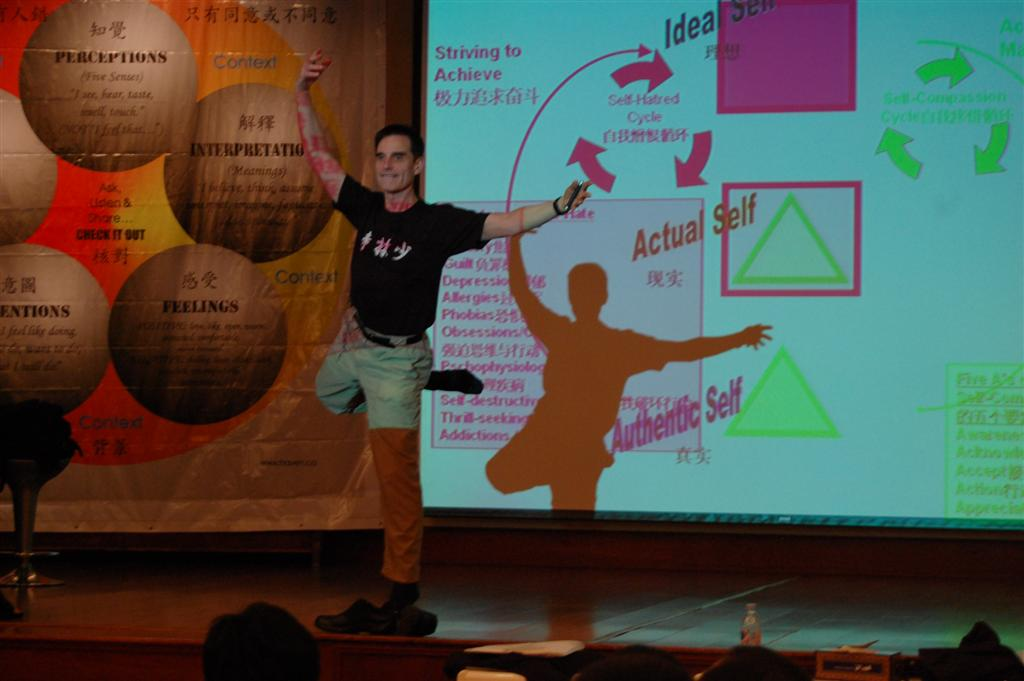
- Born: October 19, 1946 (age 80); Owen Sound, Ontario, Canada
- Education: University of Western Ontario, College of Chinese Acupuncture (UK)
- Years active: 1964-present
- Known for: Co-founder, Haven Institute
- Medical career
- Profession: Physician, acupuncturist, author, lecturer
- Institutions: Haven Institute
- Research: Human Potential Movement

John Herbert Ross McKeen (born October 19, 1946), is a Canadian physician, acupuncturist, author and lecturer who co-founded the Haven Institute (Gabriola Island, Canada) with Bennet Wong. He has written on East-West medicine, alternative medicine, holistic health, Asian studies and personal growth.

== Education and honours ==
McKeen received his M.D. from the University of Western Ontario in 1970, and did his medical internship at the Royal Columbian Hospital, New Westminster, B.C., Canada, 1970-71. He received a Lic.Ac.(UK), from the College of Chinese Acupuncture, Oxford, England, in 1974. He was inducted into Alpha Omega Alpha medical honor society in 1968. In 2012, he was awarded an honorary Doctor of Letters by Vancouver Island University for his work with Bennet Wong in establishing the Haven Institute.

== Career ==
=== Individual career ===
McKeen was a regular panelist for many years on the weekly television quiz show Take Your Choice. In 1969, he was part of a medical field clinic in Jamaica. In 1969 and 1970, he worked in street clinics and drug crisis centres with the Alcoholism and Drug Addiction Research Foundation, London, Ontario. Between 1971-1974, McKeen was on the staff of the Royal Columbian Hospital in New Westminster, B.C., working in emergency medicine. In 1973-74, he studied classical Chinese acupuncture with J. R. Worsley at the College of Chinese Acupuncture in Oxford, England. He returned to Vancouver to establish a medical practice using acupuncture and psychological approaches.

McKeen has advocated integration of eastern and western medical approaches, encouraging western medicine to study oriental approaches and acupuncturist to cooperate with western medicine. He engaged in advocacy resulting in legislation permitting nonmedical practitioners to use acupuncture. From 1984-88, he was a member of the Senate of the Academy of Sciences for Traditional Chinese Medicine in Victoria, B.C., which established the Canadian College of Acupuncture and Oriental Medicine. He was appointed in 1988 as a Charter Member of the American Academy of Medical Acupuncture. From 1987 on, he has been teaching classical Chinese philosophy and medicine in Asia. He was appointed Professor of Humanistic Psychology at Hua Wei University in Shen Zhen, China in 2007.

=== Partnership with Bennet Wong ===
He worked jointly with the Canadian psychiatrist Bennet Wong since 1970 in group psychotherapy and growth groups until Wong's death in 2013. Their long-standing professional partnership is the subject of Ben and Jock: A Biography by Gerry Fewster. They proposed a harmonious blending of eastern and western medical approaches. They conducted onsite trainings in Thailand for the Peace Corps, and taught a 20-day seminar entitled "Harmony: East-West Integration" in Taipei, Taiwan, and Beijing, China. A core thesis of their living philosophy is that people become ill when they hold back from each other, and can become healthier in the revelation of an intimate relationship. They have written and lectured about human sexuality. Couples, a video series that documents their relationship work, has been featured on PBS television.

From 2004 until 2008, they were consultants to Hua Wei Corporation, a Chinese global telecommunications company, advising about management training and corporate development. Their belief was that business can be a vehicle for relationship development, and thus a way to enhance health, wellness and life fulfillment.

=== The Haven Institute ===
Wong and McKeen founded the Haven Institute in 1983 and were active in its development until 2004, when they passed their ownership of the Institute into The Haven Foundation, a federally recognized Canadian non-profit charity. Both men are now Emeritus Faculty of The Haven Institute.

== Selected McKeen peer-reviewed journal articles ==
- McKeen, J. (December 1969), "Outpost Medicine in Alexandria, Jamaica", University of Western Ontario Medical Journal, vol. 39, no. 4, pp. 52–54, ISSN 0042-0336, OCLC 149709671.
- McKeen, J. (1970), "Adolescent Medicine", University of Western Ontario Medical Journal, vol. 40, no. 2, pp. 33–37, ISSN 0042-0336, OCLC 149709671.
- McKeen, JH (1970), "Adolescence and Drug Abuse", Journal of the Royal College of General Practitioners, vol. 20, no. 100, pp. 288–290, ISSN 0035-8797, OCLC 103731586, PMC 2237365, PMID 5492620.

== Wong and McKeen collaborative publications ==
=== Books ===
- Wong, B.R.; McKeen, J. (1992), A Manual For Life, Gabriola Island, BC: PD Publishing, ISBN 0-9696755-0-X, OCLC 27223856.
- McKeen, J.; Wong, B.R. (1993), As It Is In Heaven: Selected Poems of Jock McKeen (also translated into Chinese), Gabriola Island, BC: PD Publishing, ISBN 0-9696755-1-8, OCLC 28217440.
- Wong, B.R.; McKeen, J. (1995), In and Out of Our Own Way: The Teaching Stories of Bennet Wong & Jock McKeen, Gabriola Island, BC: PD Publishing, ISBN 0-9696755-2-6, OCLC 35877330.
- McKeen, J.; Wong, B.R. (1996), The Relationship Garden (also translated into Chinese), Gabriola Island, BC: PD Publishing, ISBN 0-9696755-3-4, OCLC 35925439.
- McKeen, J.; Wong, B.R. (1998), The (New) Manual For Life (also translated into Chinese), Gabriola Island, BC: PD Publishing, ISBN 0-9696755-4-2, OCLC 39615478.
- McKeen, J.; Wong, B.R. (2005), A Book About Health & Happiness (also translated into Chinese and Spanish), Gabriola Island, BC: PD Publishing, ISBN 0-9696755-6-9, OCLC 63209802.
- McKeen, J.; Wong, B.R. (2012), The Illuminated Heart: Perspectives on East-West Psychology and Thought, Gabriola Island, BC: The Haven Institute Press, ISBN 978-0-9784618-0-5.
- McKeen, J.; Wong, B.R. (2013), Joining: The Relationship Garden, Gabriola Island, BC: The Haven Institute Press, ISBN 978-0-9784618-4-3.
- Wong, B.R.; McKeen, J. (2013), Being: A Manual For Life, Gabriola Island, BC: The Haven Institute Press, ISBN 978-0-9784618-3-6.

=== Selected peer-reviewed journal articles ===
- Sulzbacher, S.; Wong, B.R.; McKeen, J. (April 1981), "Long Term Therapeutic Effects of a Three Month Intensive Growth Group", Journal of Clinical Psychiatry, vol. 42, no. 4, pp. 148–153, ISSN 0160-6689, OCLC 116055941, PMID 7204360.
- Wong, B.R.; McKeen, J. (August 1981), "The Doctor-Patient Relationship: Current Challenges", B.C. Medical Association Journal, vol. 23, no. 8, pp. 370–372, ISSN 0007-0556, OCLC 1586013.
- McKeen, J.; Wong, B.R. (1983), "Energy: What Is It?", Journal of Traditional Acupuncture, vol. VII, no. 2, pp. 9–11.
- Wong, B.R.; McKeen, J. (1987), "To Be ... Loving ... To Be", Journal of Child Care, vol. 3, no. 3, pp. 43–55, ISSN 0715-5883, OCLC 9387043.
- Wong, B.R.; McKeen, J. (November 1987), "Traditional Chinese Acupuncture and the Personality", Proceedings of the First World Congress of Natural Medicine, Beijing, China, pp. 29–32.
- Wong, B.R.; McKeen, J. (December 1988), "East Meets West: Illness and Health", Proceedings of the 4th Scientific Meeting of the Pacific Rim College of Psychiatrists, Hong Kong, pp. 42–43.
- Wong, B.R.; McKeen, J. (1990), "If The Student Is the Subject, What is the Object?", Journal of Child and Youth Care, vol. 4, no. 5, pp. 35–45, ISSN 0840-982X.
- Wong, B.R.; McKeen, J. (1989), "Memories of Abuse: A Call for a Balanced Perspective", Journal of Child and Youth Care, vol. 10, pp. 67–81, ISSN 0840-982X, OCLC 106954744.
- Wong, B.R.; McKeen, J. (1990), "A Case of Multiple Life Threatening Illnesses Related to Early Ritual Abuse", Journal of Child and Youth Care, pp. 1–26, ISBN 0-919813-75-5, ISSN 0840-982X, archived from the original on 2008-07-05.
- Wong, B.R.; McKeen, J. (1994), "The Walking Wounded: A Way of Life?", SKOLE The Journal of Alternative Education, Albany, NY, pp. 79–89, ISSN 1056-9197, OCLC 271539713.
- McKeen, J.; Wong, B.R. (1998), "The Needles Are Not The Point: A Proposal for a Dialogical Understanding of Acupuncture Therapy", Journal of Family Life, vol. 4, no. 4, pp. 56–59, ISSN 1078-4667, OCLC 31093272.
- McKeen, J.; Wong, B.R. (September 1999), "Therapy and Education", Association For Humanistic Psychology Perspective, pp. 28–29, ISSN 0022-1678, OCLC 19254255.
