= Acharya Rameshwar Jha =

Acharya Rameshwar Jha (20th century) was an Indian traditional Sanskrit scholar and considered an authority on Nyaya, Vyakarana and Vedanta. He later became an exponent of non dualistic shaivisim and is often credited with establishing and propagating Kashmir Shaivism in Varanasi.

== Life ==
His spiritual experiences and deep understanding of ancient texts were spontaneously expressed in numerous Sanskrit verses. These were published as book Purnta Pratyabhijna and SamvitSwatantram, as articles in Shiva Tatva Vimarsha and Tantra Agam Vishank of Sanmarg and are preserved in personal diaries and correspondences.
