= J. R. Worsley =

J. R. Worsley (14 September 1923 – 2 June 2003) was a British acupuncturist who is credited with European five element acupuncture also known as 'classical acupuncture'. The origins of Chinese Wuxing medicines have a Taoist, Chinese folk religious background distinguish it from the more widely known Confucian style of modernised traditional Chinese medicine.

For many years J.R.Worsely resided in the UK, where he opened the College of Traditional Chinese Acupuncture, which trained many of the leading five element practitioners practising today, including Dianne Connelly and Bob Duggan, who founded the Tai Sophia Institute (formerly the Traditional Acupuncture Institute) in Laurel, Maryland, United States. Tai Sophia has gained university status and is now named the Maryland University of Integrative Health.

Worsley and his wife started the Worsley Institute of Classical Acupuncture located in Miami Lakes, Florida for many years, where Worsley and his wife lived. Today, his wife, Judy Becker Worsley, with the Worsley Institute carries on the five element acupuncture tradition, training and certifying practitioners in schools she endorses.
