= Vasugupta =

Kashmiri shavite scholar

Vasugupta (c. 800 – 850 CE) was the author of the Shiva Sutras, an important text of the nondual tradition of Kashmir Shaivism, also called Trika (sometimes called Trika Yoga).

== Biography ==
Little is known about Vasugupta's life, other than he lived in Kashmir and in the first half of the 9th century. He probably was born in late 8th century to a Kashmiri Hindu family. This dating is based on mentions of his work in other Indian texts, and the biography of his students particularly Kallata and Somananda, both of whom are dated to have actively composed philosophical texts sometime between 825 and 900 CE. He probably was a contemporary and aware of the ideas of Advaita Vedanta, and of Buddhist scholars of the 8th and 9th century.

The author is believed in Shaiva tradition to have amassed knowledge and recognition through direct realization. He was a native of Kashmir and a Shaiva. It is unclear how and what inspired him to write the Shiva Sutras, and early texts mention no legends. Later tradition and hagiographic texts present inconsistent stories. One states that Vasugupta found the sutras inscribed on a rock called Sankaropala. Another states that Shiva appeared in his dream and recited it to him, who then wrote it down. There are additional stories, but the texts of the immediate students of Vasugupta mention none of these legends except the one where Vasugupta discovers the Sutras in his dream.

Vasugupta also wrote the Spanda Karikas as a commentary on the Shiva Sutras. He paved the way for later scholars for a cultural and religious renaissance in Kashmir which continued for centuries till the advent of Islam. His principal disciple, Bhatta Kallata spread the Shiva Sutras, and wrote Spanda-karika in the 2nd half of the 9th century.

== Philosophy and Kashmir Shaivism ==
Vasugupta is regarded by some as the founder of the system of Hindu philosophy known as Advaita Shaivism of Kashmir, or Trika.

Vasugupta's Shiva Sutra is an important Yoga text, foundational to the Trika system of Kashmir Shaivism. The text discusses the nature and cause of bondage, and how one liberates from this bondage. The text has been extensively commented upon by Indian authors, and some manuscripts have been translated into English, such as by Mark Dyczkowski and by Jaideva Singh.

== Bibliography ==
- Kshemaraja (1911). The Shiva Sutra Vimarshini: Being the Sutras of Vasu Gupta with the Commentary Called Vimarshini.
