= Bennet Wong =

Canadian psychiatrist, author and lecturer

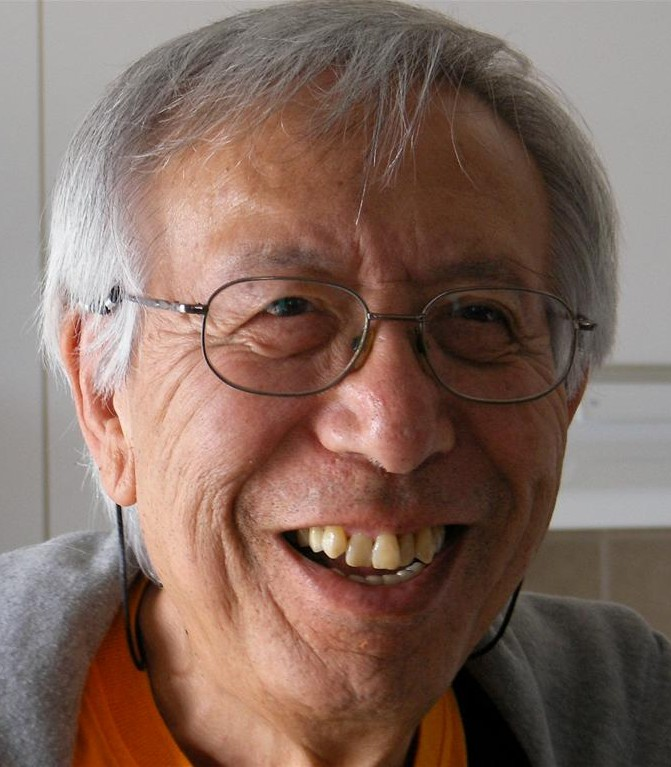
- Born: July 16, 1930; Strasbourg, Saskatchewan, Canada
- Died: September 25, 2013 (aged 83); British Columbia, Canada
- Education: University of Alberta, Menninger Clinic
- Years active: 1956-2013
- Known for: Co-founder, Haven Institute
- Medical career
- Profession: Psychiatrist, author, lecturer
- Institutions: Haven Institute
- Research: Human Potential Movement

Bennet Randall Wong (July 16, 1930 – September 25, 2013), was a Canadian psychiatrist, author and lecturer who co-founded the Haven Institute (Gabriola Island, Canada), a residential experiential learning centre on the west coast of Canada, with Jock McKeen. His writings focused on mental illness, group psychotherapy, humanistic psychology and personal growth.

== Education and honours ==
- M.D. University of Alberta, 1955
- Postgraduate Training in Psychiatry, Menninger Clinic and School of Psychiatry, Topeka, Kansas, 1956–61
- F.R.C.P.(c), Royal College of Physicians and Surgeons of Canada 1973
- Doctor of Letters (honoris causa), Vancouver Island University 2012

== Career ==
=== Individual career ===
Wong was clinical director at the Winfield State Hospital in Winfield, Kansas, from 1957 to 1959. He then practised adolescent psychiatry in Vancouver, B.C., from 1961 until 1975. Wong was an early adopter of the encounter group process. During the late 1960s, he offered media comments on youth, including hosting a national television forum on youth on CBC-TV He discussed many issues with Canada's former Minister of Health and Welfare, Judy Lamarsh, and television journalist (and later Canadian senator) Laurier Lapierre. Throughout his career, he has been an advocate of humanistic approaches to dealing with children, adolescents and families. He incorporated the mind-body approaches of Wilhelm Reich into his work, as well as the perspectives of existential therapy. Wong was a member of the Board of Directors of Moffat Communications Ltd. for twenty-five years (1973–1999). He has been noted in Who's Who in Canada. Wong was appointed as Visiting Professor of Humanistic Psychology at Hua Wei University in Shen Zhen, China, in 2007.

=== Partnership with Jock McKeen ===
After working in individual practices in Vancouver, B.C. (McKeen in acupuncture and Wong in adolescent psychiatry), they left private practice in 1975 to conduct residential growth groups at the Cold Mountain Institute on Cortes Island, British Columbia. After the demise of the Cold Mountain Institute in 1980, Wong and McKeen helped to establish the Cortes Centre for Human Development, and conducted seminars organized by this nonprofit society until 1983, when they co-founded The Haven Institute. Wong and McKeen challenge the traditional medical model, encouraging physicians to be less objectifying, to develop more self-awareness and adopt a more holistic approach to patient care. Wong and McKeen have taught this integrative approach in Canada, U.S.A., China, Taiwan, Hong Kong, Malaysia, Singapore, and Thailand as well as countries in Europe, South America, Africa and the Middle East.

=== Establishment of the Haven Institute ===
Wong and McKeen founded The Haven Institute in 1983, a residential experiential learning school on Gabriola Island, B.C., and were active in its development until 2004, when ownership was passed to The Haven Foundation. Both men were appointed Emeritus Faculty of The Haven Institute. They were both given honorary doctorates by Vancouver Island University for their work in establishing the Haven Institute (Gabriola Island, Canada).

== Publications ==
=== Selected Wong publications ===
- Wong, B.R. (July 1968), "The Adolescent in Our Changing Society", Child Welfare, vol. XLVII, no. 7, pp. 411–416, ISSN 0009-4021, OCLC 1071435.
- Wong, B.R. (October 1970), "Obstacles to Understanding Youth", Canadian Doctor, vol. 36, no. 10, pp. 97–100, ISSN 0008-3429, OCLC 1850301.
- Wong, B.R. (Fall 2005), "Toilet Training", Relational Child & Youth Care, vol. 18, no. 3, p. 57, ISSN 1705-625X, OCLC 52156766.

=== Wong and McKeen collaborative publications ===
See Wong McKeen Collaborative Publications on Wikipedia's article for Jock McKeen
