= Nirvanashatkam =

Nondual Hindu text

The Nirvanashatkam (निर्वाणषट्कम्, Nirvāṇaṣatkam), also known as Atmashatkam (आत्मषट्कम्, ātmaṣatkam), is a non-dual Saivite composition consisting of six verses or ślokas, attributed by the early modern Advaita Vedanta tradition to Adi Shankara.

== Etymology ==
"Nirvāṇa" can be roughly translated as complete equanimity, peace, tranquility, freedom and joy. "Ātman" is the True Self. "Shatakam" is a Sanskrit term meaning "consisting of six", used to refer to six-verse compositions in Hindu tradition.

== Origin ==
Shankara's hagiographies (15th-17th c. CE), showing the influence of Yoga-traditions on the Advaita-tradition of that time, narrate that when Adi Shankara (8th c. CE) was eight years old, he encountered the seer Govinda Bhagavatpada. Govinda asked Shankara, "Who are you?", to which he answered with these stanzas, whereafter Govinda accepted Shankara as his disciple.

The knowledge of 'Shivoham' (I am Shiva) is a core concept in Kashmir Shaivism, as conveyed in Pratyabhijnahridayam ('recognition (pratyabhijna) of the heart', hridayam), the knowledge of Shivoham, "I am Shiva", with hridayam originating in Kaula Shaivism. As Flood explains, in Kashmir Shaivism, the method (upaya) of saktopaya is related to cognition (jnana), "focusing on a pure thought construction (suddhavikalpa) that corresponds to a true state of affairs, such as "I am Siva". Tagare also mentions sóham, establishing the consciousness that one is not different from "the Supreme Self", a method proposed by Utpaladeva and Abhinavgupta.

== Text ==
A quite literal English translation of the composition is as follows: (Note: This text has been transliterated at 19 july 2011 from the sources at G. Sivakumar, Nirvashtakam, with some corrections made based on HinduPedia, "Nirvana Shatakam. It was retranslated at 26 march 2026, based on shlokam.org, Nirvana Shatkam (Atma Shatakam) of Adi Sankara.)

Mind, intellect, ego (manobuddhyahaṅkāra (Note: mano, manas, mind; buddhi, intellect, "the power to "form and retain concepts, reason, discern, judge, comprehend, understand"; ahaṅkāra, 'ego-making')), [my] state of mind (cittani), [are] not (naham (Note: Sanskrit Dictionary [naha]: "tying, trap, obstrucion, binding"; 'I am not bound by'; compare nisprapanca.)) [heart, center, essence]
not [the] five senses.
not [the] five elements,
Consisting of pure awareness and delight (cidānandarūpaḥ (Note: cid, (spiritual) consciousness, the core of the mind * ananda: "bliss", "delight",'the realization of something being perfectly itself' * rūpaḥ: form; "appearance"; 'value', the most essential; "consisting of")), Shiva, [is] [heart, center of being-aware] (śivo'ham) (Note: śivo, Shiva; aham, 'I am', 'the [spiritual] heart', 'the center of what "I" am'. Compare Svayam prakāśa and Aham Brahmasmi.)

Not prāṇa (vital breath), not [the] five types of breath (vāyus - Prāṇa, Apāna, Vyāna, Udāna, Samāna),
not [the] seven material essences, not [the] five sheaths (pañca-kośa).
Not [the] organ of speech, not [the] organs for holding (hand), movement (feet) or excretion,
Consisting of pure awareness and delight, Shiva [is] [heart, center of being-aware].

Not [my] hatred or dislike, not [my] affiliation or liking, not [my] greed, not [my] delusion,
not [my] pride or haughtiness, not [my] feelings of envy or jealousy.
Not [my] duty (dharma), desire for wealth (artha), lust (kāma), liberation (mokṣa).
Consisting of pure awareness and delight, Shiva [is] [heart, center of being-aware].

Not merit (virtue), not sin, not sukkha (wordly pleasure), not dukkha (suffering due to attachement),
Not mantras, holy places, scriptures (Vedas), rituals or sacrifices (yajñas).
Not [the] object being enjoyed, not the enjoyer.
Consisting of pure awareness and delight, Shiva [is] [heart, center of being-aware].

Not death, not fear, not caste-distinctions,
Not father, not mother, not birth.
Not relatives, not friends, not guru, not disciple.
Consisting of pure awareness and delight, Shiva [is] [heart, center of being-aware].

[Essence, heart] (aham) [is] without erroneous thought-constructions (nirvikalpaḥ), formless-form (nirākārarūpaḥ),
omnipresent (vibhutvāt) and everywhere (sarvatra), [beyond] all sense-faculties (sarvendriyāṇām).
Not unattached, not liberated (mukti), not measurable.
Consisting of pure awareness and delight, Shiva [is] [heart, center of being-aware].

== Interpretations ==
Swami Chinmayananda interprets Nirvana Shatakam as a systematic method of self-analysis through negation (neti-neti), guiding the seeker to identify the eternal Self by eliminating all false identifications. According to his commentary, the first two verses reject the gross and subtle aspects of existence the mind, intellect, ego, thought, five elements, five vital airs (prana, apana, samana, vyana, udana), and the five sheaths (pancha koshas) that constitute the human personality. The third verse demonstrates the liberated soul's detachment from likes and dislikes, rising even beyond the four human attainments of dharma, artha, kama, and moksha itself. The remaining verses establish that such a Self has no need for scriptures, rituals, chants, birth, death, human relationships, or caste distinctions. The refrain "Chidananda Rupah Shivoham" (I am the form of consciousness and bliss) reinforces that the true Self is nothing but pure, formless, all-pervasive consciousness the ultimate reality behind all existence.

Sadhguru comments:

Nirvana means "formless." The Nirvana Shatakam is towards this – you don’t want to be either this or that. If you don’t want to be this nor that, then what do you want to be? Your mind cannot understand this because your mind always wants to be something. If I say, “I don’t want to be this; I don’t want to be that,” you would think, “Oh something super!” Not super. “Oh, so emptiness?” Not emptiness. “Nothingness?” Not nothingness. That’s what is being conveyed through this chant.

== Sources ==
- Flood, Gavin (2003). "The Śaiva Traditions". In Flood, Gavin (ed.). The Blackwell Companion to Hinduism. Malden, MA: Wiley-Blackwell. ISBN 978-1405132510.
- Sadhguru. "Nirvana Shatakam - Shivoham Shivoham Lyrics and Meaning". isha.sadhguru.org.
- Sastri, S. N. "Nirvana Shatkam".
- Tagare, G.V. (2002). The Pratyabhijna Philosophy. Motilal Banarsidass.
