= Jivatva =

State of life or state of the individual soul in Hinduism

Jivatva (Sanskrit: जीवत्व) means – the state of life or the state of the individual soul. Jivatva is the state of life of the Jiva (transmigratory individual soul), the living entity, which is a particular manifestation of Atman, the embodied being limited to psycho-physical states, and the source of avidya that suffers (repeated) transmigration as result of its actions. Until ignorance ceases the Jiva remains caught in experience of the results of actions bringing merit and demerit, and in the state of individuality (jivatva) (Brahma Sutra I.iv.6), and so long as the connection with the intellect as conditioning adjunct lasts, so long the individuality and transmigration of soul lasts (Brahma Sutra II.iii.30).

== Overview ==
The Jivatva-bhavana is the feeling of limitation induced by the body, mind and intellect. The nature of Jivatva is adventitious, dependent on external factors; Jivatva is accidental and not an essential nature of Brahman. It is illusorily superimposed on Brahman. The Atman is the witness (saksin) of the activities of antahkarana (inward intellect) composed of buddhi (intellect), ahankara (I-faculty) and manas (mind). Viraj has one Jiva and Hiranyagarbha another, because it is commonly known that when bodies are different the Jivas are different, but it is possible to have one Jiva for the past and future bodies, a difference in the bodies does not indicate difference in respect to the Jiva.

== Jiva ==
According to Dvaitadvaita (dualism) Brahman and Jiva are different entities; that God, Soul and the Universe are three separate entities with the former governing the latter two. The Jiva (individual soul that lives in the world) is one of the three categories of realities, the other two being Jagat (the Universe or the world) and Brahman (the Universal Soul and the substratum behind the Jagat and the Jivas).The soul can migrate to the heaven and live with God. According to Vishishtadvaita (qualified non-dualism), God alone exists who is endowed with a divine, auspicious, blissful form. The Jagat and the Jivas form his body and the soul becomes liberated when it realizes that it is a part of God. According to Advaita Vedanta (non-dualism), Brahman is the ultimate supreme sole Reality beyond names and forms. Brahman, which is Truth, Consciousness and Bliss, and the soul are non-different, identical, unchangeable and eternal.

According to the dvaita schools, jiva is essentially an eternal spiritual entity (ajada-dravya) whose essence is constituted by knowledge (jnana). As jnana-svarupa it is a sentient being (cetna) and self-revealing (svayam-prakasa), as the knower or subject of knowledge (jnata) and as the agent of action (karta) it experiences both pleasure and pain (bhokta). It is monadic in character (anu) unlike Ishvara who is all-pervasive (vibhu). Jiva is a part (amsa) of Paramatman, it is supported (adheya) by, controlled (niyamya) and dependent (sesa) on the Paramatman. It is the finite individual who experiences the waking (jagarita), sleep (svapna) and dreamless sleep (susupti) states of mind which can be successive, but rarely the Fourth (turiya) which is being-in-Brahman. On account of the adhyasa, Jiva interacts with the objects and other Jivas with a sense of doer-ship etc.; and experiences samsara; liberation from samsara is called moksha.

== Relation between Jiva and Brahman ==
In the Katha Upanishad the Jiva, the individual soul, and Brahman, the Universal Soul, are regarded as being at par with each other as enjoying equally the fruits of their action. In the Mundaka Upanishad only the individual soul is described as tasting of the fruits of action, the Universal Soul described simply as the on-looker. In the Svetasvatra Upanishad the individual soul enjoys the unborn Prakrti consisting of three qualities, which the Universal Soul leaves off. This is with regard to the relation of the Two Souls first dealt with by the Rig Veda in mantra I.164.17 which reads:-

द्वा सुवर्णा सयुजा सखाया समानं वृक्षं परि षस्वजाते |
तयोरन्यः पिप्पलं स्वाद्वत्त्यनश्नन्नयो अभि चाकशीति ||

“Two birds of beautiful plumage closely united in friendship reside on the same tree.
One of them eats the sweet fruit thereof, the other witnesses without eating.”

And, adapting which ideation and imagery the sage of the Mundaka Upanishad (III.1.2) proceeds to tell us that:-

समाने वृक्षे पुरुषो निमग्नोऽनीशया शोचति मुह्यमानः |
जुष्टं यदा पश्यत्यन्यमीशमस्य महिमानमिति वीतशोकः ||

“Being seated on the same tree, the Purusha deluded grieves over his helplessness.
But when he upholds the other worshipful Lord and His Glory, he becomes free from grief.”

Jiva is limited by the inner sense organ, being limited it is distinct from the substratum consciousness of objects which is the all-pervasive consciousness (saksi). It always feels its distinction from God, because Brahman is not the object of ordinary knowledge. Jiva is the locus (asraya) of avidya. The identification between Jiva, a false entity, and Brahman, occurs only when the Jiva aspect of the Self is totally eliminated by true knowledge of the real nature of the Self dispelling the primordial avidya.

Svatantryavada is the doctrine of the absolute sovereignty and freedom of the Divine Will to express and manifest itself in any way it likes; Svatantrya makes the moveable and the immoveable objects appear as separate though in essence they are not separate from samvit (Universal Consciousness) and which does not conceal the nature of the Supreme. From the point of its manifestation, it is known as Abhasavada. Abhasavada is the theory of appearance, the creation theory of the Saiva and the Sakta schools according to which theory the universe consists of appearances which are all real as the aspects of the ultimate reality; the world is an abhasa (prakasa or light) of Shiva, it is not Maya. In the Advaita Vedanta this is the theory according to which the Jiva is the illusory appearance of Brahma-consciousness.

The theory of Abhasavada finds its roots in Brahma Sutra II.iii.50 which reads –

आभास एव च |

(And, (the individual soul) is only a reflection (of the supreme Self) to be sure),

This theory was advocated by Suresvara in which the Jivas are as real as Brahman, they being primary appearances in and through avidya, while the objects of the world are unreal, they being secondary appearances, mere reflections of the primary appearances. The Vivarna School upholds the theory of Bimba-pratibimbavada or theory of reflection, in which the Absolute Reality, reflected in upadhis, appears as numerous selves due to the intervening adjuncts and their cause Avidya. The Bhamati School of Vacaspati Misra upholds the Avacchedavada, the theory of limitation, in which the jivas are Brahman Itself but appearing as though limited by adjuncts such as the mind-body-complex.

== Significance ==
According to Sankara, the Jivatva of the Jiva is a consequence of the Jiva’s false sense of identity i.e. one-ness, with the body, making Jiva an empirical individual. The sense of bodied being-hood (sasariratvam) of the Jiva is entirely due to false conviction (mithyapratiyayanimittantvat), the truly enlightened person is bodyless even when living in this life and in this body. Avidya or ignorance consists in the wrong identification of the Self with the psycho-physical complex called the individual’s body and in the development of the self-sense (atmabhimana) in the bodied being; this is the upadhi cutting into the very nature of the Jiva. The apparent modification is an epistemic fact, and the totality of cosmic plurality is also an epistemic fact. The apparently substantial Jivatva is an offshoot of avidya sustained and nourished by mithyajnana. Jivatva, the phenomenal individuality, although beginning-less, is terminable (santa) in the case of one getting release and gaining Brahmatva. The Jivatva of the Jiva is Jiva’s limitedness. The Jivahood of the atman (the individualization of the soul) is unreal, it is merely an imagination caused by the delusion of buddhi, and vanishes with the annulment of the delusion that comes about by the realization of one’s real nature.
