= Kshemaraja =

10th/11th century Hindu philosopher

Rajanaka Kṣemarāja (क्षेमराज) (late 10th to early 11th century) was a philosopher disciple of Abhinavagupta, who was considered a master of tantra, yoga, poetics, and dramaturgy. Not much is known of Kṣemarāja's life or parentage. His chief disciple was a sage known as Yogāraja.

Kṣemarāja's magnum opus was the Pratyabhijñāhṛdayam ('The Heart of Self-Recognition'). In this text, Kṣemarāja explains the main tenets of the Pratyabhijñā philosophy in a succinct set of sutras for students. The work occupies the same place in Kashmir Shaivite or Trika literature as Sadananda's Vedantasara does in Advaita Vedanta.

== Works ==
- Pratyabhijñāhṛdayam
- Spandasandoha
- Spandaniraya
- Svacchandoddyota
- Netroddyota
- Vijnanabhairavoddyota, a commentary on the Vijñāna Bhairava Tantra
- Shivasūtravimarśinī, a commentary on the Shiva Sutras of Vasugupta
- Stavacintamanitika
- Parapraveshika
- Tattvasandoha.

=== Pratyabhijñāhṛdayam ===
The text elucidates the main tenets of the pratyabhijñā system in a succinct set of sutras, expounding the core of the philosophy and explaining how self-recognition arises within, culminating in the consciousness of Shivoham (I am Shiva). Pratyabhijñāhṛdayam consists of 20 aphorisms plus a commentary by Kṣemarāja himself. Translations are given by:

- Singh, Jaideva (1982). Pratyabhijñāhrdayam. Motilal Banarsidass. ISBN 8120803221.
- Tagare, G.V. (2002). The Pratyabhijna Philosophy. Motilal Banarsidass.

Chapter 18 is also commented on by Shankarananda (2016).

== See also ==
- Abhinavagupta
- Vasugupta
- Somananda
- Utpalacarya
- Kundalini
- Yoga

== Sources ==
Shankarananda (2016). The Yoga of Kashmir Shaivism: Consciousness is Everything. Motilal Banarsidass.
