= Somananda =

Kashmiri Shavite Scholar

Somananda (875–925 CE) was one of the teachers of Kashmir Shaivism, in the lineage of Trayambaka, and the author of the first philosophical treatise of this school (the Śivadṛṣṭi). A contemporary of Bhatta Kallata, the two were the first of the Kashmiri Shaivites to propose the concepts of non-dual Shaivism in a rigorous and logical way. Somananda lived in Kashmir—most probably in Srinagar, where most of the later philosophers of the school lived—as a householder.

== Lineage ==
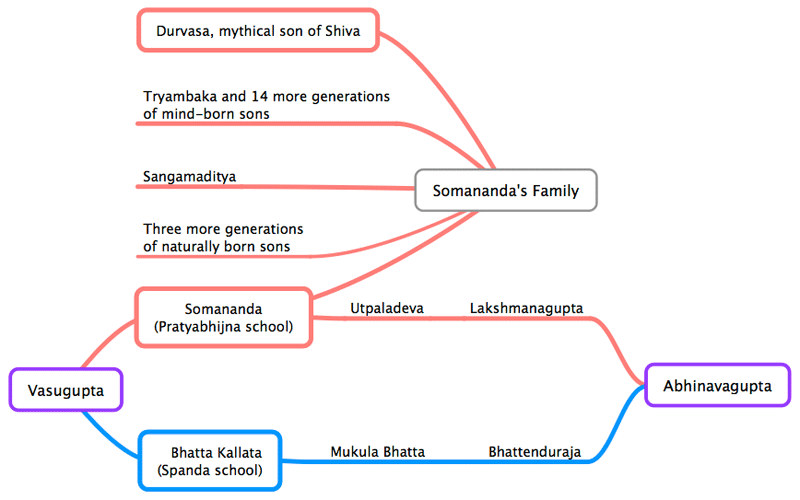
The Lineage of Somananda

There is considerable myth surrounding the origins of Somananda. He claimed himself to be a descendant of the sage Durvasa, who had received from Shiva the spiritual mission of keeping the tradition and secrets of Agamic Shaivism alive. It is said that Durvasa created his son—the aforementioned Tryambaka—directly from his own mind (similarly to the way that Athena was said to have been created directly from the mind of her father, Zeus, in Greek mythology). In turn, Tryambaka also created a son directly from his mind; this process continued for 15 (total) generations until eventually terminating with the father of Sangamaditya, who took a woman as a wife. Three further generations hence, the birth of Somananda took place. Somananda thus claims a divine spiritual ancestry and investiture.

Somananda was the disciple of Vasugupta, another important Shaivite master and the author of the Shiva Sutras, one of the fundamental texts of non-dual Shaivism. Bhatta Kallata, author of the Spanda-Karika—another important and well-known text in the tradition—was a contemporary of Somananda's, and a fellow disciple of Vasugupta's. Each of these two disciples of Vasugupta—that is, both Somananda and Bhatta Kallata—initiated their own schools of monistic Shaivism: Pratyabhijna and Spanda, respectively.

The apparent difference between the extant texts from these rival disciples, however, is mainly to be found in the scope, or focus, of each—rather than in the essence. While Somananda's Śivadṛṣṭi has a philosophical bent, Bhatta Kallata's Spanda-Karika is more practice-oriented, and shorter in length.

Somananda's most significant disciple was Utpaladeva. Utpaladeva wrote a number of texts to continue and develop his teacher's work, including the Īśvarapratyabhijñākārikā, of which Abhinavagupta's Īśvarapratyābhijñāvimarśinī is a commentary; Utpaladeva also commented upon the Śivadṛṣṭi of his teacher. Following Utpaladeva came Lakshmanagupta, and then Abhinavagupta, whose work became considered the epitome of the Kashmiri Shaivite tradition. Abhinavagupta took teachings from all the schools of Shaivism known to him—including, in the main, both that which had originated with Somananda, and that which had been initiated by Bhatta Kallata—and was said to have attained spiritual liberation himself, after which he took on the immense task of uniting all of these schools into one coherent system. Abhinavagupta's main work—in which he provides a detailed exposition of this project's results—is the Tantraloka.

== Philosophy ==
Based on the profundity of his writings, it is supposed that Somananda attained the highest spiritual realization; from such a position, he was able to compose texts of deep understanding and insight. Minute attention for detail, and a great capacity to express in clear terms even the most difficult points, are both apparent in his works. When examining opposing views, he makes an effort to understand them in their own terms, and to present them fairly; he then goes on to explain—with subtle logic—exactly how they are refuted.

Somananda was a householder, and his system was accordingly designed to be applied by people in the midst of everyday life; he rejected practices which require seclusion and the renunciation of society.

Somananda is mainly remembered as the first preceptor of the Pratyabhijñā school. He defined the theoretical aspects of Pratyabhijñā in his main work, the Śivadṛṣṭi; his son, Utpaladeva, refined and developed it, leaving the task of bringing it to completion and integrating it with the other schools of Kashmir Shaivism to Abhinavagupta.

Utpaladeva explicitly presents Somānanda as the founder of the doctrine: the Īśvarapratyabhijñākārikā (IV.16) describes its "new path" as one stated by "the great teacher" in the Śivadṛṣṭi, and Utpaladeva's Vṛtti on that verse says that Somānanda "indicated" the path, to which Utpaladeva himself then gave a "rational foundation" (yukti nibandhana). Likewise, Abhinavagupta calls Utpaladeva's verses a "reflection" (pratibimbaka) of the Śivadṛṣṭi. Nevertheless, as Raffaele Torella has pointed out, the school takes its name from Utpaladeva's work rather than from Somānanda's: the term pratyabhijñā ("recognition") occurs only once in the Śivadṛṣṭi (IV.120a), and there without any technical significance.

His philosophy is both idealistic-monism and theistic; in essence, he states that "everything is Shiva". Besides being all things, Shiva is also cit-ananda: that is, consciousness-bliss. He is in possession of an absolutely free will, Svātantrya, with which he creates the manifestation of all without the use of any external instruments or materials. He manifests through his powers of knowledge and action.

The notion of Svātantrya is central to Somananda's philosophy. The free will of Shiva is manifested as energy, called Śakti, which emanates from Shiva himself and is the stuff from which the world is created; thus—being ontologically anterior to the world—it is beyond any obstacles. When Śakti begins the process of manifestation it subdivides into a number of ontological categories or substances called tattvas, 36 in number: thus, in Somananda's doctrine, the world is considered real (rather than illusory, as generally posited by the other monistic-idealistic spiritual schools).

The written work of Somananda is not restricted to philosophical system-building, but contains also an account of the positions held by rival philosophical schools, and a series of refutations of the same. For example, Somananda disagrees with the gross realism of the Nyaya-Vaisesika system, the subtle realism of Samkhya, and the idealism of Vedanta or of the Buddhist Vijñānavāda. In his view, the universe is an appearance—yet not one of Maya (illusion), but rather of the free will of Shiva; hence, in reality, the universe is Shiva himself. Similarly, instead of postulating a principle of beginning-less ignorance, or avidya—as in Advaita Vedānta—Somananda holds that it is through the free will of Shiva (Svātantrya) that ignorance appears. Ignorance is thus not an ontological reality, but an epistemological phenomenon.

== Works ==
Somananda was the author of the first philosophical treatise on monistic Shaivism—the Śivadṛṣṭi—a work in seven chapters. It starts by describing the eternal nature of Shiva and the creation of the universe. The author expounds a theory of non-differentiation—unity of subject and object, everything being of the nature of consciousness, cid-rupa. A large portion of the book is dedicated to the exposition, analysis and critique of various religio-philosophical systems and ideas: the Vivarta theory of the grammarians; the Śākta approach to the ultimate reality; the nuance of the differences between the author's own approach and the Vijñānavādin principle of monism; the Advaita Vedāntin concept of ignorance; and the fundamental principles of all the other major spiritual schools of the time. At the close, Somananda describes the history of Kashmiri Shaivism and of his own family.

Other texts by Somananda include a commentary on his own Śivadṛṣṭi and on the Parātrīśikā (entitled Parātrīśikāvivaraṇa—not to be confused with the more well-known work of the same name by Abhinavagupta).
