= Trika =

Subschool of Kaula-Shaivism

Trika was a school of Kaula which flourished in Kashmir between ca. 900 and 1300 CE, and is often used synonymously for the whole of Kashmir Shaivism, an exegetical tradition which developed in Kashmir after 850 CE, as an adaptation to upper-class Hindu norms of 'wild' tantric Kaula traditions. The Kashmir Trika-tradition developed the "Philosophy of Recognition" (pratyabhijñā), a nondual form of Tantric Shaivism.

Defining features of the Trika tradition are the use of several triades in its philosophy, including the three goddesses Parā, Parāparā, and Aparā; and its idealistic and monistic teaching of pratyabhijna ("direct knowledge of one's self," "recognition") philosophical system, propounded by Utpaladeva (c. 925–975 CE) and Abhinavagupta (c. 975–1025 CE). The name of the system is derived from its most famous work, Īśvara-pratyabhijñā-kārikā by Utpaladeva. The central thesis of this philosophy is that we are Śiva, and that we have to "re-cognise" this. Thus, the slave (paśu: the human condition) shakes off the fetters (pāśa) and becomes the master (pati: the divine condition).

The main exegetical works of the Trika-tradition are those of Abhinavagupta, such as the Tantraloka, Mālinīślokavārttika, and Tantrasāra. Another important text of this tradition is the Vijñāna-bhairava-tantra, which focuses on outlining numerous yogic practices. Trika Shaivism later spread beyond Kashmir, particularly flourishing in the states of Odisha and Maharashtra.

== Nomenclature ==
Kashmir Shaivism is an umbrella-term for several non-dual Shaiva-Shakta tantric religious traditions that flourished in Kashmir after 850 CE, as an adaptation to upper-class Hindu norms of 'wild' tantric Kaula traditions, and include the spanda ('Divine vibration') teachings, and the "Philosophy of Recognition" (pratyabhijñā) of the Trika-school. Kashmir Shaivism is often used synonymously for the Trika-school and it's "Philosophy of Recognition" (pratyabhijñā).

The name pratyabhijñā is derived from Īśvara-pratyabhijñā-kārikā, written by Utpaladeva. Etymologically, pratyabhijñā is formed from prati- ("re-") + abhi- ("closely") + *jñā ("to know"), so the meaning is "direct knowledge of one's self," "recognition."

== History ==
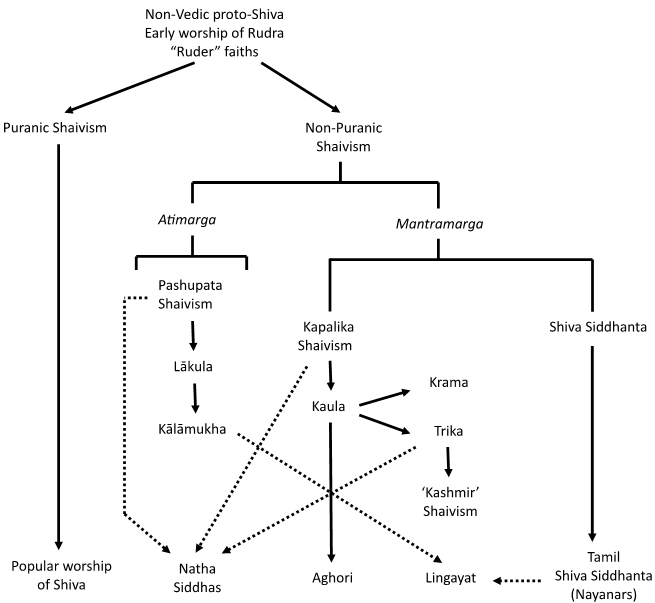
The development of various schools of Shaivism from proto-Shiva and early worship of Rudra.

Trika, named after the use of several triades (trika) in its philosophy, was a subdivision of the Kaula-tradition, probably originated outside Kashmir before 8oo CE, but the pratyabhijñā developed in Kashmir.

=== Growth and flowering (900–1200 CE) ===
Kashmir Shaivism in the 10th century CE was dominated by the nondual Trika and Krama, and the dualistic Shaiva Siddhantha. Out of the confrontation between these two systems grew a body of nondual exegetical works which are commonly known as "Kashmir Shaivism". (Note: Wallis (2013): "... the second phase, the exegetical writings of the Śaiva Tantrik masters from Kashmīr. It is this body of literature that has been called “Kashmīr Shaivism” since the early 20th century and taught in the West under that name but entirely disassociated from the full context of Śaiva Tantra and its scriptures)

While Trika draws from numerous Shaiva texts, such as the Shaiva Agamas and the Shaiva and Shakta Tantras, its major scriptural authorities are the Mālinīvijayottara Tantra, the Siddhayogeśvarīmata and the Anāmaka-tantra. The main theologians of Trika Shaivism are those of the Pratyabhijñā (Recognition) school of Shaiva non-dual philosophy.

Somānanda (875-925) wrote the Śivadr̥ṣṭi, "the first work of full-fledged scholastic philosophy" of the Trika school. Utpaladeva (c. 900–950 CE) and Abhinavagupta (c. 950–1016, a student of one of Utpaladeva's disciples) developed the Pratyabhijñā-system into its mature form. Utpaladeva's Īśvarapratyabhijñā-kārikā (Verses on the Recognition of the Lord) is one of the main works of this tradition, but was overshadowed by the work of Abhinavagupta. Thus, according to Torella, "Abhinavagupta's Īśvarapratyabhijñā-Vimarśinī and the Īśvarapratyabhijñā-Vivr̥ti-Vimarśinī (a commentary on Utpaladeva’s Vivr̥ti on his own Īśvarapratyabhijñā-Kārikā and Vr̥tti) are generally considered the standard works of the Pratyabhijñā." Torella notes however, that "most of Abhinavagupta’s ideas are just the development of what Utpaladeva had already expounded."

Abhinavagupta was initiated in the sampradayas (lineages) of the Trika, Pratyabhijñā, the Kaula Krama, and Shaiva Siddhantha, and also self-studied that spanda-system. Abhinavagupta wrote numerous other works on Shaiva tantra. His Tantrāloka, Mālinīślokavārttika, and Tantrasāra are mainly based on the Mālinīvijayottara Tantra, although they also drew heavily on the Kali-based Krama tradition of the Kulamārga. Abhinavagupta's Tantrāloka is probably his most important work. According to Christopher Wallis, "the Tantrāloka is a monumental explication of Tantrik practice and philosophy in over 5,800 verses. It is encyclopedic in its scope though not organized like an encyclopedia, for instead of just enumerating theories and practices, it brings them all into a coherent framework in which everything has its place and everything makes sense in relation to the whole."

One of Abhinavagupta's students, Kshemaraja, is also an important figure who authored the short Pratyabhijñāhṛdayam (The Essence of Self-Recognition).

Jayaratha (1150–1200 CE) wrote a commentary on the Tantrāloka.

=== Decline (1200 CE – 20th century) ===
After 1200 CE, the institutional basis and support for the Shaiva and Buddhist Tantric tradition mostly disappeared with Islamic conquests of the region leading to the slow decline and contraction of the tradition, though especially the Kaula-influenced lineages continued to be passed down and practiced by wandering ascetics well into the 18th century, due to their non-institutionalized structure.

== Texts ==
According to Mark S. G. Dyczkowski, Kashmiri Trika Shaivism looks to three scriptures "as its primary authorities", the Mālinīvijayottara Tantra, the Siddhayogeśvarīmata and the Anāmaka-tantra.

As a monistic tantric system, Trika Shaivism, as it is also known, draws teachings from shrutis, such as the monistic Bhairava Tantras, Shiva Sutras of Vasugupta, and also a unique version of the Bhagavad Gītā which has a commentary by Abhinavagupta, known as the Gitartha Samgraha. Teachings are also drawn from the Tantrāloka of Abhinavagupta, prominent among a vast body of smritis employed by Kashmir Shaivism.

In Utpaladeva's Īśvarapratyabhijñākārikā, the treatment of scripture is confined to a single section, the Āgamādhikāra, which follows the rational examination of the problem and immediately precedes the concluding synthesis. According to Raffaele Torella and Isabelle Ratié, this arrangement brackets the āgamas rather than presenting them as the foundation of the doctrine: the scriptural section adds nothing to the demonstration, but serves to show after the fact that conclusions reached by reason and experience alone are compatible with the revealed texts.

Pratyabhijñā Śāstra are those writings which have mainly a metaphysical content. Due to their extremely high spiritual and intellectual level, this part of the written tradition of Shaivism is the least accessible for the uninitiated. Nevertheless, this corpus of writings refers to the simplest and most direct modality of spiritual realization. Pratyabhijñā means "recognition" and refers to the spontaneous recognition of the divine nature hidden in each human being (atman). The most important works in this category are: Īśvara Pratyabhijñā, the fundamental work of Utpaladeva, and Pratyabhijñā Vimarśinī, a commentary to Īśvara Pratyabhijñā. Īśvara Pratyabhijñā means in fact the direct recognition of the Lord (Īśvara) as identical to one's Heart. Before Utpaladeva, his master Somānanda wrote Śiva Dṛṣṭi (The Vision of Siva), a devotional poem written on multiple levels of meaning.

In Utpaladeva's Īśvarapratyabhijñākārikā, the treatment of scripture is confined to a single section, the Āgamādhikāra, which follows the rational examination of the problem and immediately precedes the concluding synthesis. According to Raffaele Torella and Isabelle Ratié, this arrangement brackets the āgamas rather than presenting them as the foundation of the doctrine: the scriptural section adds nothing to the demonstration, but serves to show after the fact that conclusions reached by reason and experience alone are compatible with the revealed texts.

== Trika- and Pratyabhijna-philosophy ==
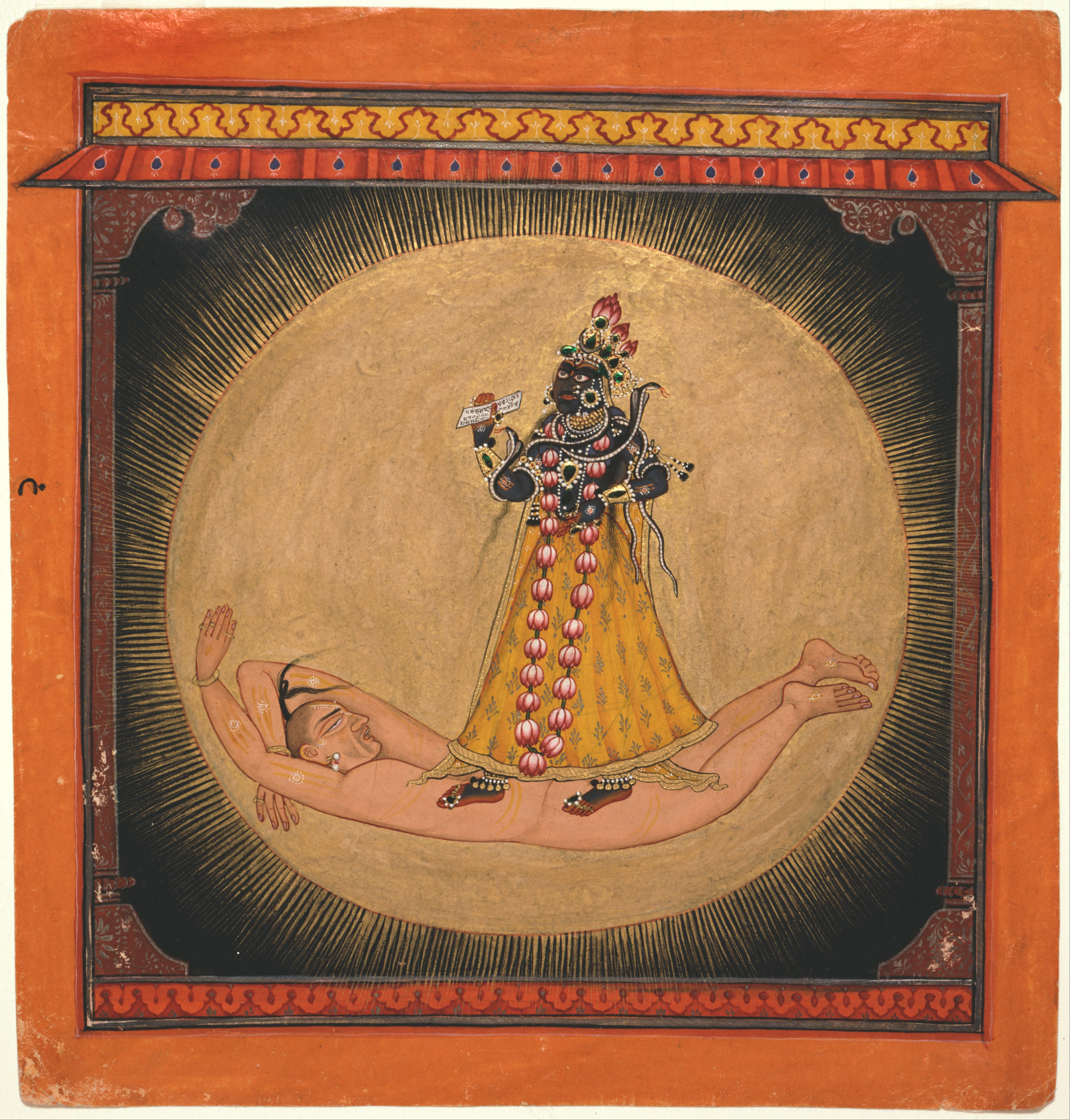
A painting of goddess Kali from Jammu and Kashmir, c. 1660-70, from a Tantric Devi series attributed to Kripal of Nurpur (active c. 1660 - c. 1690). Philadelphia Museum of Art

=== Influences ===
Trika Pratyabhijna Shaivism was a nondual idealistic and monistic theism, influenced by the works of the Saiva monist Vasugupta (c. 800–850 CE), and numerous Śaiva scriptures such as the Agamas, the Śaiva-Śakta Tantras and Kaula scriptures. The Trika philosophical system of Pratyabhijñā is presented in the works of Somānanda (c. 900–950 CE), Utpaladeva (c. 925–975 CE), Abhinavagupta (c. 975–1025 CE) and his disciple Kṣemarāja (c. 1000–1050).

According to Christopher Wallis, the philosophy of Trika Shaivism also adopted much of the ontological apparatus of Sāṅkhya school, such as its system of 25 tattvas, expanding and reinterpreting it for its own system of 36 tattvas. Another important source for Trika is the monistic theism of Tirumular's Shaiva Siddhanta. The Saivas also were influenced by the work of Buddhist Vijñānavāda and Pramanavada philosophers, especially Dharmakirti, who was also taken as a primary non-Saiva opponent and whose doctrines were sometimes absorbed into the Pratyabhijñā system.

=== Triads (trika) ===
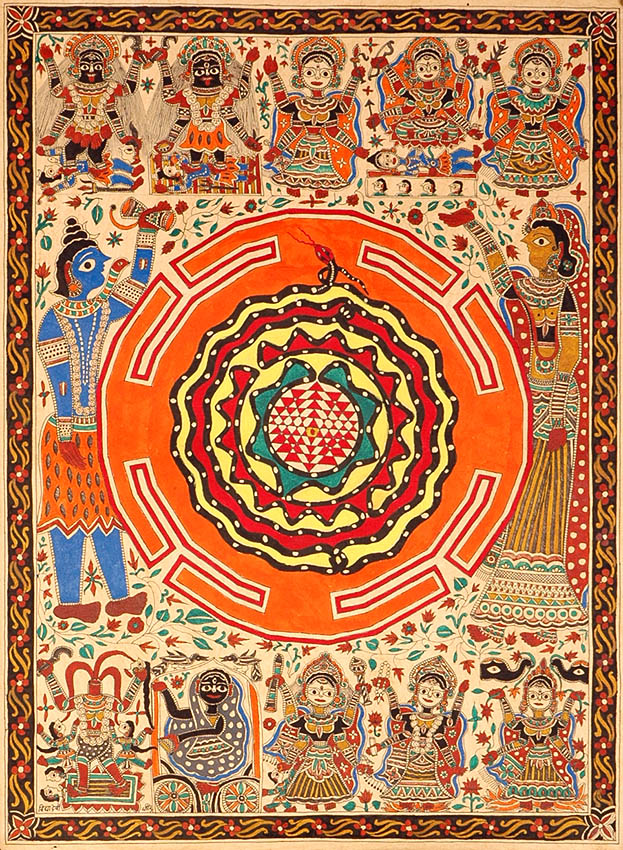
Sri Yantra diagram with the Ten Mahavidyas. The triangles represent Shiva and Shakti, the snake represents Spanda and Kundalini.

An important element of Trika Shaivism's theology is the use of several triads (symbolized by the trident) in its description of Absolute and phenomenal reality, hence the name trika. There are several triads described in Trika-works of thinkers like Abhinavagupta including,

- Three realities: Śiva, the Supreme Transcendent), Śakti, the creative force, immanent in creation, the link between the macrocosm and the microcosm, and Aṇu, the limited atom or individual, a complete image of the ultimate, the microcosm of the macrocosm. In Kashmiri Shaivism, the Goddess Shakti is incorporated in Shiva, the shaktiman ("possessor") of the creative force of Shakti. The human identity with Shiva is realized through Shakti, "by assuming his mythic agency in emanating and controlling the universe through Shakti."
- Three powers: Icchā (will), Jñāna (knowledge), and Kriyā (action). Any action of any being, including God, is subject to these three fundamental energies. Iccha or Will is in the beginning of any action or process. Jnana by which the action is clearly expressed first in mind, before it is put into action. Then comes Kriyā, the energy of the action.
- Three entities: pati (Śiva), pāśa (bondage), paśu (soul)
- Shakti Triad or Three Goddesses: Parā (transcendence), Parāparā (transcendence and immanence) and Aparā śakti (immanence)
- Three aspects of knowledge: Pramatri (the subject), Pramana (the modalities of knowledge) and Prameya - the known object
- Three states of consciousness: jāgrat (waking), svapna (dreaming) and suṣupti (dreamless sleep)
- Three-fold spiritual path: Śāmbhavopāya, Śāktopāya and Āṇavopāya
- The transcendental triad: prakāśa (luminosity), vimarśa (dynamics),sāmarasya (homogeneous bliss)
- The three impurities: āṇavamala, māyā, karma

=== Pratyabhijna - One consciousness Being unfolds as the multiplicity of the world ===
Central to Kashmir Trika Shaivism is pratyabhijñā, "recognition." Etymologically, pratyabhijñā is formed from prati- ("re-") + abhi- ("closely") + *jñā ("to know"), so the meaning is "direct knowledge of one's self," "recognition."

The central thesis of this philosophy is that everything is a manifestation or unfolding of absolute consciousness, termed Śiva, and it is possible to "re-cognise" this fundamental reality and be freed from limitations, identified with Śiva and immersed in bliss. Thus, the slave (paśu: the human condition) shakes off the fetters (pāśa) and becomes the master (pati: the divine condition).

Pratyabhijna teaches that though the identity of all souls is one with God (Isvara) or Shiva (which is the single reality, Being and absolute consciousness), they have forgotten this due to Maya or ignorance. However, through knowledge one can recognize one's authentic divine nature and become a liberated being.

The basic theology of Trika's Recognition school, as summarised by Utpaladeva in Īśvarapratyabhijñā-Kārikā (Verses on the Recognition of the Lord), is as follows:

There is only one Great Divinity, and it is the very inner Self of all creatures. It embodies itself as all things, full of unbroken awareness of three kinds: “I”, “this”, and “I am this.”

The school's theology is expressed by Kshemaraja in his Pratyabhijñā-hṛdayam (The Heart of Recognition) as follows:

Awareness, free and independent, is the cause of the performance of everything. She unfolds the universe through Her own will and on Her own canvas. It becomes diverse by its division into mutually adapting subjects and objects. The individual conscious being, as a condensation of universal Awareness, embodies the entire universe in a microcosmic form.

The modern scholar-practitioner of Shaiva Tantra, Christopher Wallis outlines the metaphysics and theology of non-dual Shaiva Tantra thus:

All that exists, throughout all time and beyond, is one infinite divine Consciousness, free and blissful, which projects within the field of its awareness a vast multiplicity of apparently differentiated subjects and objects [...] When those finite subjects then identify with the limited and circumscribed cognitions and circumstances [...] they experience what they call “suffering.” To rectify this, some feel an inner urge to take up the path of spiritual gnosis and yogic practice [...] triggering a recognition that one’s real identity is that of the highest Divinity [...] it becomes the nonconceptual ground of every moment of experience [expanding] into perfect wholeness.

This single supreme reality is also sometimes referred to as Aham (the heart). It is considered to be a non-dual interior space of Śiva, support for the entire manifestation, supreme mantra and identical to Śakti.

=== Theory of manifestation ===
The Pratyabhijñā theory of manifestation is Ābhāsa (ā- – slight, bhāsa – manifestation) – i.e. appearance in a limited way, or "slight manifestation of Śiva". The supreme consciousness (samvit) is like a mirror and the universe is like a reflection appearing in it. The mirror analogy is often used to explain ābhāsa because a mirror, like consciousness, can contain an infinity of different images without being itself affected.

Pratyabhijñā affirms that the universe appears as an ābhāsa in the mirror of supreme consciousness, samvit, but unlike a physical mirror which needs an external object to form a reflection, the image in the mirror of samvit is projected by samvit itself – this activity is called svātantrya, power of will. In other words, the universe appears inside samvit because Śiva so desires.

Advaita Vedanta proposes a somewhat similar theory of universe as an illusion superimposed on consciousness. The difference in Pratyabhijñā is that the cause of manifestation is not an eternal separate principle of ignorance (avidyā), but the will of Śiva, and the creation itself is ontologically real, not just an illusion. It is made of ābhāsas, which are nothing but the ideation of Śiva appearing as empirical objects.

Thus, all things are ābhāsa: earth, water, fire, etc. All their qualities are ābhāsa. Complex ābhāsas are composed of simpler ābhāsas, culminating with the whole world.

Paradoxically, even though ābhāsas have the nature of consciousness, they also exist externally on account of being manifested through the occultation power (maya) by Śiva. An advanced meditator is capable of seeing the world as ābhāsa, a flash of consciousness (cit) and bliss (ānanda), identical with his own self (ātman) and non-differentiated (abheda). In other words, the light of consciousness shines from within the object of perception, as an intuition, a super-human direct kind of vision.

If the universe is contemplated from the point of view of manifestation, it appears as ābhāsa, but when contemplated from the point of view of the Ultimate Reality, it appears as svātantrya. Svātantrya is the complementary concept of ābhāsa accounting for the initial impulse of manifestation. The theory of svātantrya affirms that Śiva, the fundamental Reality, appears as distinct subjects and objects, but this does not conceal his real nature. Thus, the free will of Śiva, which is absolute unity, is to manifest, to create multiplicity. This impulse to create is Śiva's playful nature (lilā).

=== Tattvas - the elements of reality ===
The ābhāsa concept focuses on the essential nature of manifestation. In order to analyze in detail the nature of the existents the Pratyabhijñā system appropriated the 25 tattva ontology of Samkhya and improved on it by expanding the upper tattvas. Instead of Spirit (Purusha) and Nature (Prakriti), Kashmir Shaivism has five pure tattvas representing the Ultimate Reality and then six more representing the occultation process (māyā) which translates the non-dual pure Reality to time and space limited world and its subjects.

=== Impurity ===
The māla (meaning "dirt" or "impurity") theory states that the infinite self, atman, is reduced and limited by three forces produced by Śiva. Śiva, by exercising his free will – svātāntrya, takes contraction upon himself and manifests as countless atoms of consciousness (cidaṇu – consciousness quantas). Cidaṇu are enwrapped by material vestment.

The three malas are āṇava māla – the limitation of smallness, māyīya māla - the limitation of illusion and kārma māla – limitation of doership. Kārma māla exists in the physical body, māyīya māla in the subtle body, and āṇava māla in the causal body. Āṇava māla affects the spirit and contracts the will, māyīya māla affects the mind and creates duality, kārma māla affects the body and creates good and bad actions. They correspond to individuality, mind and body.

Of the three limitations, only the first one, āṇava māla, which is the basis of the other two, is impossible to surpass through effort alone, without the help of divine grace (śaktipāt). Āṇava māla is manifested as residual impressions existing in the causal body (subconscious mind). It is the combined effect of the five limitations (kañcuka) taken together, the gateway from limited towards the unlimited, from the pure-impure (bheda-abheda) world of the ego towards the pure reality of the first five tattvas, culminating with Śiva and Śakti.

Māyīya māla manifests as the mind. In Pratyabhijñā, the mind is seen as the root of illusion. The concept of mind here is different from Buddhism. In Buddhism, mind collates the aspect of awareness. Here, it is only related to the activity of thought forms, emotions, ego and the five senses. Thus, all cognitions being limited perceptions of the absolute, are illusions, on account of containing a sense of duality.

Kārma māla manifests the physical body. Its essence is limitation of the power of action and the illusion of individual agency, the effect of which is the accumulation of karma in the causal body.

The maturity of malas of a person is related to the level of grace (śaktipāt) he is able to receive. With dedicated practice, kārma māla and māyiya māla can be surpassed, but then the practitioner must put his fate in the hands of Śiva, as Śiva alone can bestow the grace of lifting āṇava māla and helping him recognize (pratyabhijñā) his essential nature.

=== Jivatman ===
The soul (jivātman) is the projection of Śiva in manifestation. When taking on the five limitations (kañcuka) the infinite spirit appears as integrated in space and time, with limited powers of action and knowledge and a sense of incompleteness.

These five constrictions are the result of the action of an impurity called āṇava māla. Its function is to make the unlimited appear as limited and severed from the whole. This does not mean that jīvātman is limited, it just appears so on account of ignorance. Jīvātman is not created or born, but rather has the same status as Śiva, performing on a small scale the same actions that Śiva performs on a universal scale – creation, maintenance, dissolution, occultation and grace. However, his powers are circumscribed by mālas.

In order to open jīvātman towards external objects it is placed within the subtle body, also known as the mental apparatus or puryaṣṭaka – the eight gated fortress of the soul. The eight gates are the five elements – earth, water, fire, air, aether plus the sensorial mental (manas), ego (ahamkāra) and intellect (buddhi).

Jīvātman is further limited by two more impurities, in addition to the first one, āṇava māla – the limitation of atomicity. Through the next impurity, māyīya māla, things appear as dual / differentiated. The limited subject, jīvātman, is immersed in a world full of external objects, in a fundamental duality between self and non-self.

Furthermore, through the third impurity – kārma māla – the subject has the illusion that he is the doer, though, limited in power. Atman, by contrast, when acts, is identified with Śiva and acts as a part of Śiva.

That is why the limited soul is described as enslaved (paśu) while Śiva is the master (pati). By purification of the three impurities the limited soul too can recognize (Pratyabhijñā) his real nature, becoming pati himself.

=== Moksha ===
In Pratyabhijñā, the concept of liberation (mokṣa) is the recognition (pratyabhijñā) of the original, innate awareness of self in which all this universe appears as Śiva-consciousness. That liberated being also attains what is called cid-ānanda (consciousness-bliss). In its highest form, this bliss is known as jagad-ānanda, literally meaning the bliss (ānanda) of the whole world (jagat).

In jagad-ānanda the universe appears as the Self (ātman). In a practical way the definition says that, when there is no need to sit in meditation for samādhi, that is jagad-ānanda, because then nothing except the supreme consciousness (samvit) is perceived. The mind rests in the unlimited consciousness the inside becomes outside and vice versa, and there is a sense of oneness and total immersion. No matter what the liberated being is doing (eating, walking, even sleeping), he experiences bliss of the deepest level.

== Trika-practice ==
=== Prerequisites ===
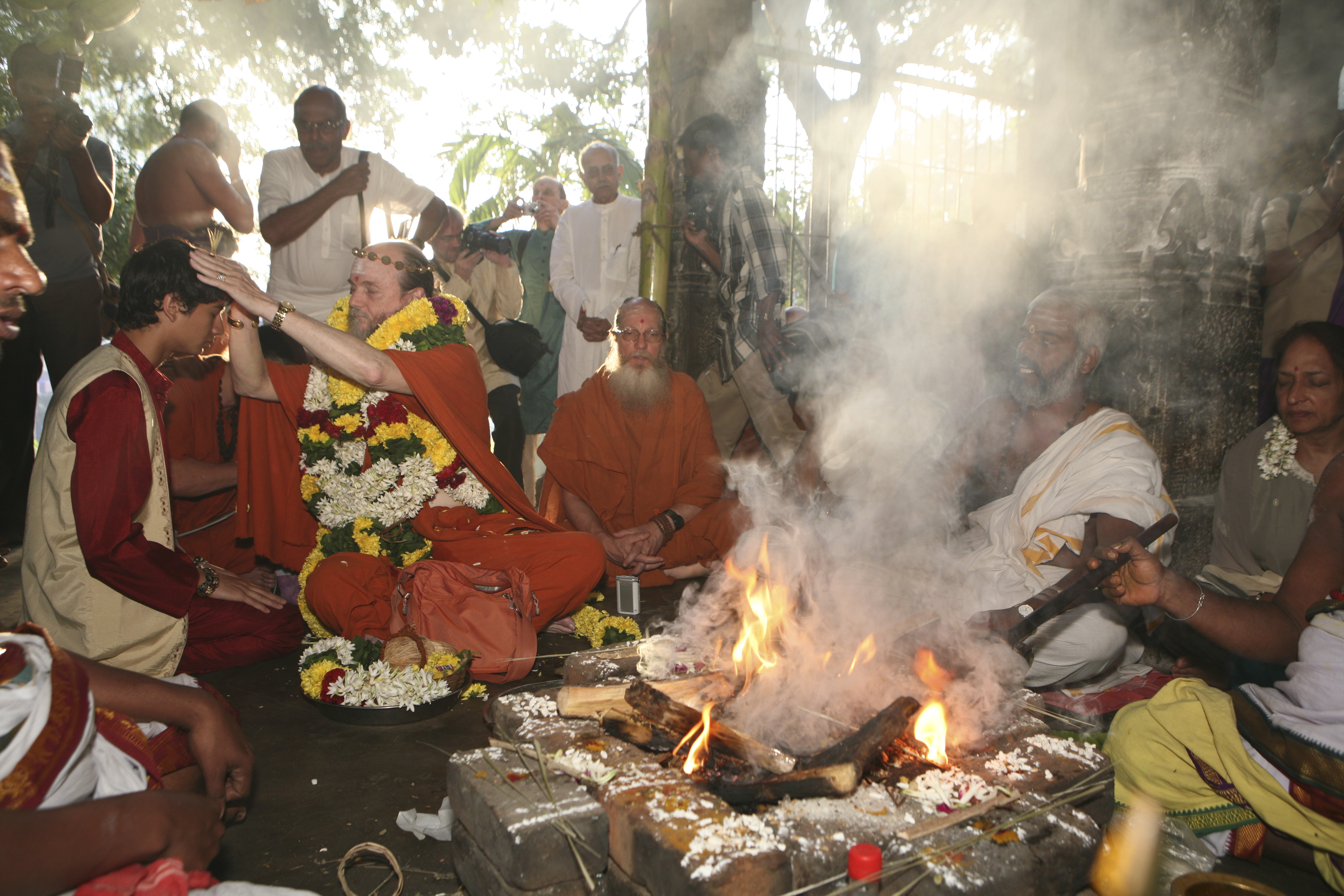
Tantric initiation (dīkṣa) is necessary for undertaking the tantric practices of Trika Saivism.

Since Trika is a Tantric tradition, a necessary prerequisite for Trika yogic practice is tantric initiation or dīkṣa. The Mālinīvijayottara Tantra, a major source for the tradition, states: "Without initiation there is no qualification for Saiva yoga."

Although domesticated into a householder tradition, Kashmir Shaivism recommended a secret performance of Kaula practices in keeping with its tantric heritage. This was to be done in seclusion from public eyes, therefore allowing one to maintain the appearance of a typical householder.

The Mālinīvijayottara Tantra outlines several major preconditions conferring the authority to practice Yoga:

The Yogin who has mastered posture [and] the mind, controlled the vital energy, subdued the senses, conquered sleep, overcome anger and agitation and who is free from deceit, should practise Yoga in a quiet, pleasant cave or earthen hut free from all obstructions.

=== Four upayas ===
To attain moksha, sādhana or spiritual practice is necessary. Trika texts describes four major methods (upāya-s) to reach total immersion (samāveśa) into the divine:

1. anupāya, the "non-means" or the pathless path. Wallis explains this as a very rare case in which "a śaktipāta awakening so intense that one single teaching from a true guru is enough to stabilize that awakening permanently." (Note: See also udden awakening)
2. śāmbhavopāya, related to desire or will, "the sudden upsurge of emotion and instinct that shatters thought construction", which is nirvikalpa, without thought-construction. According to Wallis, this method is a way of grace which works with the pure will (icchā-śakti) of consciousness. It is a non-conceptual (nirvikalpa) method, which may work with everyday experiences, bija mantras or certain simple techniques to access the divine, such as gazing at the sky, becoming absorbed in a powerful emotion or the practice of "catching hold of the first moment of perception." Wallis defines it as an "immediate intuitive apprehension of the total flow of reality as it is, free of thought-constructs, dawning within awareness already whole and complete (pūrṇa), even if momentary."
3. śāktopāya, related to cognition (jnana), "focusing on a pure thought construction (suddhavikalpa) that corresponds to a true state of affairs, such as "I am Siva". Wallis writes that this method "focuses on shedding mental constructs that are not in alignment with reality (aśuddha-vikalpas) and the cultivation of wisdom, that is, modes of understanding that are in alignment with reality (śuddha-vikalpas)." This method mainly works with the power of knowing (jñāna-śakti) and emphasizes the use of the power of cognition to purify and refine our mental constructs (vikalpas) and the energy of our thoughts and emotions so as to bring them into full alignment with the truth.
4. āṇavopāya, individual means, related to kriya, action, the development of pure thoughts by means of mantra, meditation on body-parts and the breath, meditation on external objects, centers of the subtle body (chakras) and the imagination and focuses on the power of action (kriyā-śakti). This method includes most of the usual methods of classical yoga: meditation (dhyāna), prāṇāyāma, visualization, mantras, meditation with seed syllables (varṇa-uccāra), activation of the subtle centers, yogic postures (karaṇa), and meditative ritual performance (pūjā). In the Tantrasāra, Abhinavagupta defines this method as "that which is applied in the spheres of imagination, prāṇa, the body, and external things. There is absolutely no difference among these methods in that the practice of any of them may yield the supreme fruit."

=== Development of the Centre (madhya) ===
==== Vikalpa-kṣaya – dissolution of thought-constructs ====
Pratyabhijñāhrdayam verse 18 gives four means to develop "the Centre" (madhya, which is samvit, cit, hridaya (Note: See also wisdomlib.org, samvid; and Sanjukta Gupta, The Cosmic Play of Power: Goddess, Tantra and Women, p.56: "Samvit is both pure consciousness and the reflective consciousness.")). In vikalpa-kṣaya one concentrates on "the heart" (hridayam), dissolving any thought-constructs (vikalpa) and thus entering a state of nirvikalpa, "holding the Self as the real experient in the focus of consciousness, entering the turiya or turiyatita condition.

Vikalpa kshaya is the "dissolution of all thoughts" or removal of the sense of difference. According to Shankaranada, "The point is to keep the mind still, to focus on awareness itself, not the thoughts".

According to Dyczkowski, vikalpa kshaya is sukhopaya (anupaya), a direct means which does not require breath control or the recitation of mantras, but "involves absorption in the reflective awareness of the subject", requiring "awareness of cognition as the connecting link between [...] subject and object". (Note: Dyczkowski (1992, p. 207) "to attend to the indeterminate cognition (samvedana), which both reveals and is the source of determinate perceptions, and so decreases the latter in order to increase the former. This method, Ksemaraja says, is the best because it is the most natural, internal and direct. It does not require the practice of breath control or the recitation of Mantra, but forms a part of the blissful, direct means (sukhopaya) related to Kaula practice. Basically, it involves absorption in the reflective awareness of the subject by the gradual intensification of the means of knowledge (pramana) through attention to the relationship between subject and object. It requires, in other words, awareness of cognition as the connecting link between them, in the unity of a direct concept-free awareness.")

According to Taimni, vikalpa-kṣaya corresponds to citta-vṛtti-nirodha, the cessation of mental fluctuations as stated in the Yoga Sutras of Patanjali. According to Tagare, there is also similarity with Vipasana. According to Shankarananda, it is a shambhavopaya, akin to the Zen and Dzogchen traditions.

==== Additional practices ====
Additional practices, which do not specifically belong to pratyabhijñā, are śakti-saṅkoca, śakti-vikāsa, vaha-ccheda, and adyanta-koti-nibalana.

Śakti-saṅkoca is a śaktopāya technique, According to Singh, it is withdrawing attention from sensory perception to the Self. According to Shankarananda, śakti-saṅkoca is retraction of sakti, awareness, akin to pratyāhara and indriya-samvara, "guarding the sense-doors". Kshejamara compares it to tortoise bringing its limbs back into the shell. Kshejamara also quotes a mantra from the Kathopanishad, stating that by reverting the sight inside, one sees atman (pratyagatman) and becomes immortal.

Śakti-vikāsa is also a is a śaktopāya technique., "holding the consciousness steadily within, while the senses are allowed to perceive their objects".

Vaha-ccheda, an āṇavopāya-technique, is "cessation of prāṇa and aprāna by repeating inwardly the letters 'ka', 'ha' etc. without the vowels, and tracing the mantras back to their source where they are unuttered, resting the ascending and descending vayus in the heart. Such a technique belongs to the āṇavopāya (the lowest of the three categories of techniques in Kashmir Shaivism).

Adyanta-koti-nibalana is "focus[ing] on the space between two breaths". According to Singh, it "is the practice of fixing the mind at the time of the arising of prana and it's coming to an end between the adi i.e. the first or heart and the anta i.e. the distance of twelve fingers from the heart", that is, the locus of attention should be in the regions of the heart (anāhata) and above the crown (dvādaśānta). It can be combined with the mental recitation of the two syllables of the ajapa mantra so-'ham ("That"-"I am") or ham-sa ("I am"-"That"), one syllable when berathin in, the other when breathing out.

Kșema adds concentration on an intense artistic emotion as an additional technique. Likewise, the Vijñāna Bhairava Tantra gives a large number of methods to attain nirvikalpa.

==== Vyutthana ====
According to Tagara, explaining sutra 19, permanence of samadhi, vyutthana, is attained when awareness of Cit becomes the stable background of all phenomena, "conside[ring] himself as identical with Cit. According to Shankarananda, comparing vikalpa-kṣaya with the Spanda Karika, the highest state is reached when there is no mental agitation, that is, when there is "no negative thrust to the process [of producing mental images]".

=== Six laksyas ===
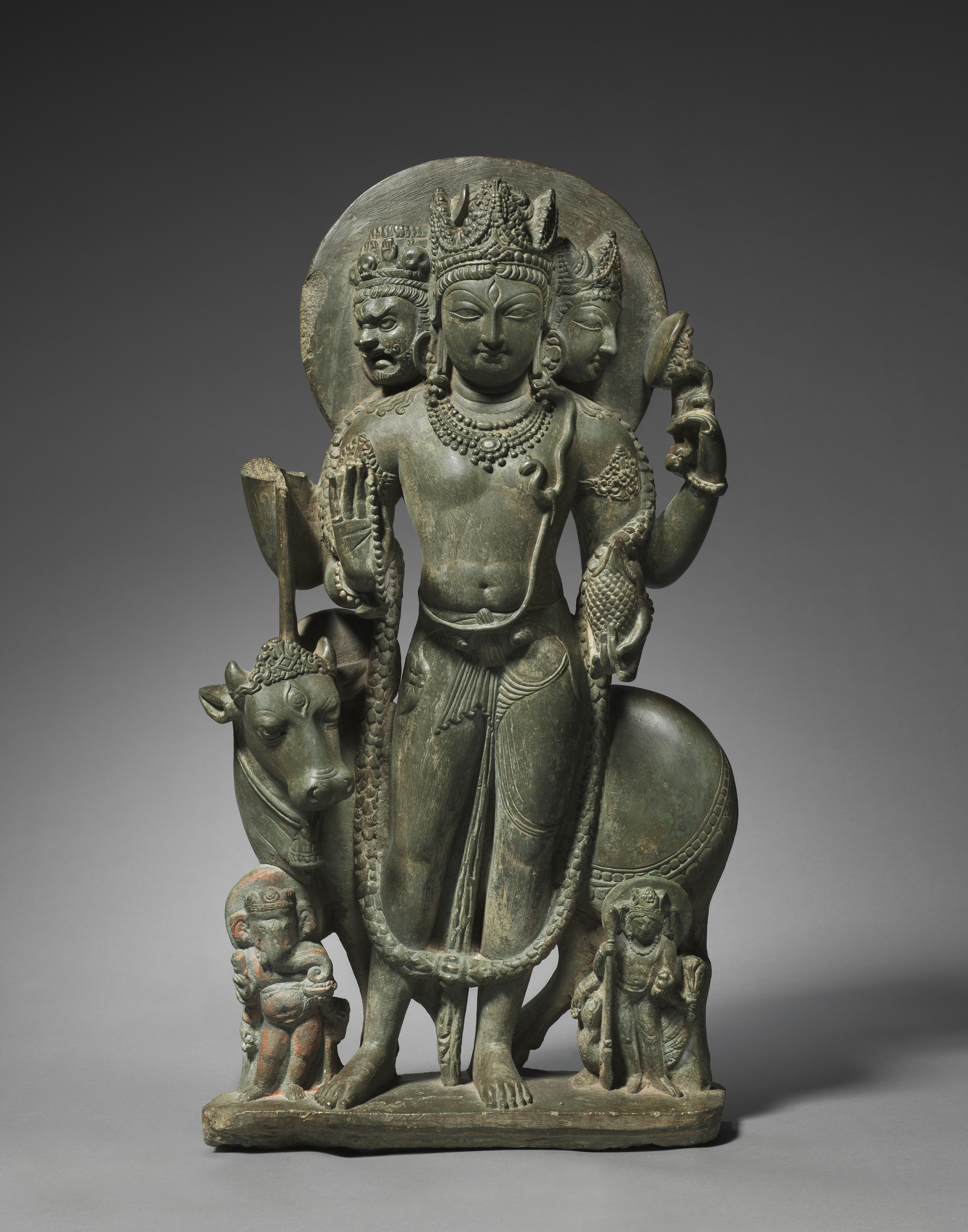
Schist statue of Shiva Mahadeva, Northern India, Kashmir, 8th century. Cleveland Museum of Art.

The Mālinīvijayottara Tantra, a Trika text which "attempts to integrate a whole plethora of competing yogic systems", outlines six "varieties of the goal" or "targets" (laksyas) of yogic practices to attain liberation, namely:

- Contemplation of void (vyoman), which bestows all Perfections and liberation.
- Contemplation of body (vigraha), which bestows the coercion of deities like Visnu or Rudra
- Contemplation of drop (bindu), which bestows sovereignty over Yogins
- Contemplation of phoneme (varna), which bestows the Perfection of mantra
- Contemplation of world (bhuvana), which bestows regency of a world
- Contemplation of resonance (dhvani), which leads to isolation and liberation.

Each of the goals is given specific practices. In the Mālinīvijayottara Tantra, perfecting the Void is said to be reached by moving the mind and vital energy (through the use of mantric resonance) through two groups of three voids located along the central channel (which are also correlated with a system of six cakras), reaching to the region above the head. Different scriptures outline different lists of voids and their location in the body. The practice of resonance deals with various sounds, and how the yogin is to focus on a specific sound and its resonance within the central channel.

Regarding mantra, different Saiva tantras and texts teach different mantras and bija (seed) mantras. These mantras are generally intoned (uccara) at different positions in the body along the central channel (such as at the heart, throat, forehead, etc). The Diksottara tantra for example, teaches the intonation of the 'haṃsá' mantra, beginning in the heart region. Some texts teach "a lineal ascent through the heart, the throat, the palate, and the forehead, culminating with the transcendence of sonic experience as the 'Limit of Resonance' [nadanta] in the cranium is pierced." Other texts have the mantric energy follow the breath through the nose outside the body.

=== Four types of Saiva yoga ===
According to Vasudeva Somadeva, the Mālinīvijayottara Tantra distinguishes four different types of Saiva yoga. According to Somadev Vasudeva, these are:

- tattvajaya, "the conquest of the reality-levels (tattvajaya)", adapted from the Siddhanta tantras but "transformed into a radically new type of yoga based on the fifteen levels of the apperceptive process";
- ṣaḍaṅgayoga, "the yoga of six ancillaries", "which is taken over [from the Siddhanta tantras] with only minor variations";
- "Kaula yoga with its system of four immersions (pindastha, padastha, rupastha and rupatita)";
- "the three types of possession (avesa) taught in the Trika (anava, sakta and sambhava) which are innovatively presented as three meta-categories under which all yogic exercises can be subsumed."

==== The conquest of the tattvas ====
In Trika texts as well as those of other Saiva schools, it is common to formulate the process of yogic conquest of the realities (tattvas) as a series of Dhāraṇās. Dhāraṇās ("introspections") are "complex sequences of meditative practices" which focus on a series of contemplations on a "hierarchy of apperceptive states designed to bring him ever closer to the level of the highest perceiver, Shiva". This hierarchy of meditations and visualizations is based on the Shaiva schema of the 36 tattvas. According to Somadev Vasudeva, the procedure can be described thus:

The Yogin starts by disengaging the mind from external stimuli and then fixes it upon a tattva [such as earth, water, etc] with ever deepening absorption. He attains an internalised vision of the reality, and compares it with his authoritative, scriptural knowledge of the highest level. By means of tarka [reasoning], an ontological value judgement, he discerns that it is different from Siva and thus transcends it. The Yogin’s ascension inevitably brings him to the reality which is Siva at the zenith of all paths.

One example of the meditation on the tattva of buddhi (intellect) from the Mālinīvijayottara Tantra is as follows:

Contemplating in the heart a lotus with colour of the rising sun, with eight petals containing the [eight bhavas] of dharma etc., and a pericarp, [the Yogin’s] intellect becomes steady within a month. Within six he becomes a knower of the Sruti (scripture). Within three years he himself becomes an author of scriptures. Contemplating his own [physical] form there (in the heart), he perceives the principle of intellect.

==== Șaḍaṅgayoga - the yoga of six ancillaries ====
Trika yoga generally uses a system of six "limbs" or ancillaries (aṅgas) which are seen as subsidiary to the principle conquest of the tattvas. This system was adopted from the Saiva Siddhanta as well as in Pāñcarātra scriptures such as the Jayakhyasamhita. According to Somadeva Vasudeva, in Trika, ṣaḍaṅgayoga "is to be understood as a collection of helpful or even indispensable yogic techniques which enable the prospective Yogin to achieve the required “coalescence” or “identification” (tanmayata, lit. the “consisting-of-that-ness”) with the object of contemplation."

These six subsidiaries as outlined in the Mālinīvijayottara Tantra are:

- Prānāyāma, control of the "breath" or "vital energy" (prana), includes various forms of inhalation, exhalation, kumbhakah, as well as proper posture (asana), defined as either lotus or some other seated posture. The practice of udgatha (eruption) is also taught, which is a "process whereby the retained air is propelled or launched upwards from the navel-region so that it strikes the head."
- Dhāranā (fixations or concentrations). Four are taught: Fire, Water, Sovereign (defined as bindu and nada) and Nectar (fixating upon a lunar disc above the cranium which drops divine nectar into the central channel, filling the body).
- Tarka (judgment or reasoning), defined as "the ascertainment of what is to be cultivated and what is to be rejected."
- Dhyāna (meditation), defined as "attentive contemplation on Siva" or "a focused stream of awareness directed towards the judged and thus accepted reality".
- Samādhi, a deep absorption that arises from prolonged (the text states 48 minutes) and "firmly established" meditation, in which the yogin "becomes as though non-existent. He reaches a state where he becomes as though dead, from which even intense sounds and other such [sense data] cannot rouse him."
- Pratyāhāra, withdrawal of the mind from the senses

In the Mālinīvijayottara Tantra (chapter 17), these are seen as six progressive steps leading to complete identification with the object of meditation. Different Saiva tantras outline different forms of the six ancillaries, and "there is no consensus as to their order, their definition or even their subdivisions" among the different tantras.

==== Utkrānti - transference of consciousness ====
The practice of utkrānti, "transference of consciousness at the moment of death," is also taught in nondual Saiva Tantras like the Mālinīvijayottara Tantra, which uses the vital energy rising through the central channel to end one's life and proceed to union with Siva. The text says that this abandonment of the body can be done at the end of one's life, after one has mastered all that one has set out to achieve.

== Influence ==
The Trika Shaiva tradition was widely influential on other Indian religious traditions, particularly the Haṭha-yoga traditions, such as the Nāth school of Gorakṣa and the Dasanāmī Sannyāsins, which draw much of their yogic practice and ideas of the subtle body from Trika scriptures.

Trika Shaivism also strongly influenced Shakta traditions. Śrīvidyā, which likely originated in Kashmir, relied heavily on Trika philosophy in its seminal explanatory texts like the Yoginīhṛdaya and received commentaries by Trika masters like Jayaratha, and became an influential tradition on mainstream Hinduism, flourishing with institutional support in South India. Another tantric tradition influenced by Trika was the post-classical Kalikula (family of Kali) form of Shaktism which is influential in northeastern Indian regions, such as in Bengal, Orissa, and Nepāl.

== Relation of pratyabhijñā to other Indian traditions ==
=== Kashmir Shaivism schools ===
In the context of Kashmiri Shaivism, Pratyabhijñā is sometimes classified as śāmbhavopāya (the path of Shambhu, i.e., Śiva), and at other times as aṇupāya (the non-path). Śambhavopaya and Anupaya are classes of practices related to consciousness directly; by contrast, the lower two classes of practice are Śaktopaya—the path of Śakti, which relates to the mind—and Anavopaya—the path of the limited being, which relates to the physical body. Thus, Pratyabhijñā is considered to be the shortest, most direct path to liberation, an evolution based on consciousness alone.

Even though it shares the same practices relating to the ascension of kundalini in the middle channel (sushumna nadi), Pratyabhijñā claims instantaneous progression, while the Krama school maintains there is gradual progression.

With regard to the Spanda school, Pratyabhijñā is more philosophical, putting the accent on instantaneous realisation (recognition) of the Ultimate, while the Spanda school is more practical (as per its fundamental text, Spandakārikā), and puts its accent on the vibrating energy aspect of consciousness.

=== Buddhism ===
The most important difference between Pratyabhijñā and Buddhism is related to the ontological ultimate: while Buddhism rejects the concepts of soul (atman) and god (īśvara), the Kashmiri Shaivites put them at the top of their world model.

In his philosophical treatise Īśvara-pratyabhijñā-kārikā, Utpaladeva also rejects the vasana theory (the dream model of the world) of the Sautrāntika school of Buddhist philosophy; he suggests another model for idealism: Śiva, who is pure consciousness, manifests all objects internally, by virtue of his free will, svātantrya, and the objects appear as real and external to limited beings. He appeals to the analogy of the famed materialisation of objects by advanced yogins, purely by using their psychic powers.

=== Advaita Vedanta ===
With regard to the problem of how the world comes by, Utpaladeva rejects the Advaita Vedānta theory of eternal and independent ignorance (avidyā), which affirms that brahman (the absolute consciousness) is being affected by avidyā (eternal ignorance) by superimposition, with a resulting enslavement of the inactive, subject consciousness to worldly life. In Kashmir Shaivism, avidyā (ignorance) and its cosmic aspect, māyā (illusion), are nothing but Śakti, the power of Śiva; as Śakti, they are real for limited beings, but are simple manifestations of consciousness for Śiva.

In Advaita Vedānta, with regard to the limited being (jīva), all activity belongs to the intellect (buddhi); in Kashmir Shaivism, activity is also ascribed to ātman, who is not inert, but in possession of the five-fold actions of creation, maintenance, dissolution, occultation, and grace. A liberated jīva, in Advaita Vedānta, is freed from the universe—but here, in Kashmir Shaivism, the universe appears as the real I-consciousness, a mass of consciousness and bliss.

In Advaita Vedanta, consciousness (cit) is only light (prakāśa), but in Pratyabhijñā it is also activity, doer-ship.

== Sources ==
- Baumer, B. (1997). Mysticism In Shaivism And Christianity. D.K. Printworld.
- Brooks, Douglas Renfrew (1992). Auspicious wisdom: the texts and traditions of Srīvidyā Sākta Tantrism in South India. SUNY series in tantric studies. Albany, NY: State Univ. of New York Press. ISBN 978-0-7914-1146-9.
- Dyczkowski, Mark S. G. (1989). The Doctrine of Vibration: An Analysis of the Doctrines and Practices of Kashmir Shaivism. Motilal Banarsidass Publ.
- Dyczkowski, M.S.G. (1992). The Stanzas on Vibration. SUNY.
- Flood, Gavin (1996). An Introduction to Hinduism. Harvard University Press.
- Flood, Gavin (2003). "The Śaiva Traditions". In Flood, Gavin (ed.). The Blackwell Companion to Hinduism. Malden, MA: Wiley-Blackwell. ISBN 978-1405132510.
- Flood, Gavin (2006). The Tantric Body.
- Kapoor, S. The Philosophy of Saivism. Vol. 1.
- Kapoor, S. (2004a). The Philosophy of Saivism Vol.1. Vol. 1. Cosmo Publications.
- Kapoor, S. (2004b). The Philosophy of Saivism Vol.2. Vol. 2. Cosmo Publications.
- Lawrence, David Peter. "Kashmiri Shaiva Philosophy". Internet Encyclopedia of Philosophy.
- Mason, Christine Marie. "Episode #146 Near Enemies of the Truth: The Spiritual Bypassing Platitudes with Gold at the Center". The Rose Woman Podcast.
- Mishra, Kamalakar (1999). Kashmir Shaivism. The Central Philosophy of Tantrism. Sri Satguru Publications.
- Moti Lal Pandit (2007). An Introduction to the Philosophy of Trika Shaivism. Munshiram Manoharlal Publishers.
- Muller-Ortega, Paul E. (1989). The Triadic Heart of Siva: Kaula Tantricism of Abhinavagupta in the Non-dual Shaivism of Kashmir. SUNY Press.
- Olson, Carl (2007). The Many Colors of Hinduism. Rutgers University Press. ISBN 978-0-8135-4068-9.
- Ratié, Isabelle (2011). Le Soi et l'Autre: Identité, différence et altérité dans la philosophie de la Pratyabhijñā. Jerusalem Studies in Religion and Culture (in French). Vol. 13. Leiden: Brill. ISBN 978-90-04-20344-0.Padoux, André; Jeanty, Roger-Orphé, eds. (2013). The heart of the yoginī: the Yoginīhṛdaya, a Sanskrit tantric treatise. New York: Oxford University Press. ISBN 978-0-19-998233-2.
- Sanderson, Alexis (1988). "Saivism and the Tantric Tradition". In Clarke, Peter (ed.). The World's Religions. Routledge.
- Sanderson, Alexis (2005a), "Saivism:Saivism in Kasmir", in Jones, Lindsay (ed.), MacMillan Encyclopedia of Religion. Vol.12: Rnying Ma Pa School - Soul, MacMillan
- Sanderson, Alexis (2005e), "Saivism: Krama Saivism", in Jones, Lindsay (ed.), MacMillan Encyclopedia of Religion. Vol.12: Rnying Ma Pa School - Soul, MacMillan
- Sanderson, Alexis (2009). "The Hinduism of Kashmir" (PDF). Archived from the original (PDF) on 2015-10-02.
- Sanderson, Alexis (2014). "The Śaiva Literature" (PDF). Journal of Indological Studies (Kyoto), Nos. 24 & 25 (2012–2013), 2014, pp. 52-53. Archived from the original (PDF) on 4 March 2016.
- Shankarananda (2016). The Yoga of Kashmir Shaivism: Consciousness is Everything. Motilal Banarsidass.
- Singh, Jaideva (1982). Pratyabhijñāhrdayam. Motilal Banarsidass. ISBN 8120803221.
- Tagare, G.V. (2002). The Pratyabhijna Philosophy. Motilal Banarsidass.
- Taimni, I.K. (1974). The Secret of Self Realization. The Theosophical Publishing House.
- Torella (2021). "Nondualistic Saivism of Kashmir". In Goetz, Stewart; Taliaferro, Charles (eds.). The Encyclopedia of Philosophy of Religion, 4 Volume Set. Wiley.
- Vasudeva Somadeva (2004). The Yoga of the Mālinīvijayottara Tantra. Critical edition, translation & notes. Institut Francais de Pondichery, Ecole Francaise d’Extreme-Orient.
- Wallis, Christopher (2013). Tantra Illuminated, Part II, A History of Śaiva Tantra. Mattamayura Press.
