= Hridayam =

Hridayam may refer to:

- hṛdayam, 'the heart', the innermost Self in Kashmir Shaivism
- Hridayam (film), 2022 Indian Malayalam-language film
