= Tantrasara =

The Tantrasara is a work attributed to Abhinavagupta, the most famous historical proponent of the Trika or Kashmir Shaivism philosophy of Hinduism. It is said to be a condensed version of the Tantraloka, Abhinavagupta's masterpiece.
