= Raniero Gnoli =

Italian Orientalist, indologist and historian of religion (1930–2025)

Count Raniero Gnoli (20 January 1930 – 5 May 2025) was an Italian orientalist, indologist and historian of religion.

== Life and career ==
A student of Giuseppe Tucci and Mario Praz, Raniero Gnoli was a Professor of Indology at the University of Rome La Sapienza from 1964 to 2000, as well as dean of the School of Oriental Studies at the same university.

Famous Sanskritist, his scope of research covered the theologies and religious philosophies of India, especially those related to Tantric Shaivism (i.e., Kashmir Shaivism), medieval schools of Buddhist logic, and doctrines mentioned in Kālacakratantra.

Gnoli was also the first to translate many texts belonging to the Indian religious traditions from Sanskrit into Western languages, contributing decisively to a more precise definition of the relevant terminology. He remained the only one in the world to have translated the voluminous work Tantrāloka written in the 10th century by Indian philosopher Abhinavagupta.

An expert also in Greek and Roman culture, he compiled Marmora Romana, a thorough "study of the decorative stones used by the ancients, that is, of marbles which, in the classical meaning of the word, include all decorative stones susceptible to polishing."

Raniero Gnoli was the brother of Gherardo Gnoli who was the president of the Italian Institute for Africa and the East.

Gnoli died on 5 May 2025, at the age of 95.

== Works ==
The full list of works by Raniero Gnoli was published in a collection of studies in his honor: Le Parole e i Marmi (The words and the marbles - ed. by Raffaele Torella ). Rome, IsIAO, 2001, pp. XVII-XX. These include:

- Marmora Romana. Rome, Elephant Editions, 1988 ISBN 88-7176-033-6
- Thirteen poems. Rome, Elephant Editions, 1981
- La Rivelazione del Buddha (The Revelation of the Buddha - ed. by Raniero Gnoli, transl. by Claudio Cicuzza and Francesco Sferra) 2 vols. - I Testi Antichi (The Ancient Texts), 2001. Il Grande Veicolo (The Great Vehicle), 2004. Milan, Meridiani Mondadori.
- Memory of Giuseppe Tucci, Rome, IsIAO, 1985.
- The aesthetic experience according to Functional Abhinavagupta. Rome, IsIAO, 1956.
- Nepalese inscriptions in gupta characters. Rome, IsIAO, 1956.

== Translations ==
- Abhinavagupta, Abhinavagupta. Light of scripture, Turin, typographical Union-Turin-based publishing, 1972.
- Abhinavagupta, Abhinavagupta's comment to Paratrimsika, (Parātrimśikātattvavivarana), Rome, IsIAO, 1985.
- Dharmakirti, The Pramanavarttikam of Dharmakirti. The First Chapter with Autocommentary (Pramānavārttikasvavrtti), Rome, IsIAO, 1960.
- Gabriele Faerno, Fables choices. Rome, Elephant Editions, 1970.
- Nāgārjuna, Le Stanze del Cammino di Mezzo (The Stanza of the Middle Way, Madhyamaka karika), introduction, translation and notes, Turin, Basic Books, 1979.
- Udbhata, Udbhata's commentary on the Kavyalankara Bhamaha of Rome, IsIAO, 1962.
