= Kaula (Hinduism) =

Religious tradition in Hinduism

Kaula, also known as Kula, Kulamaarga ("the Kula path") and Kaulaachaara ("the Kaula tradition"), is a Tantric tradition which developed from the Kapaalika tradition, domesticating the 'pollutional' elements of this tradition and making it accessible for married householders. Kaula preserves some of the distinctive features of the Kapaalika, characterised by distinctive rituals and symbolism connected with the worship of Shakti and Shiva that is associated with cremation-ground or charnel ground asceticism, found in Shaktism and Shaivism.

Kaula developed into four main systems, known as the Four Transmissions, namely eastern (Trika), western (Kubjika), southern (Daksinamnaya) and northern (Mata and Krama). In later Hatha Yoga, the Kaula visualization of kundalini rising through a system of chakras is overlaid onto the earlier bindu-oriented system.

== Name ==
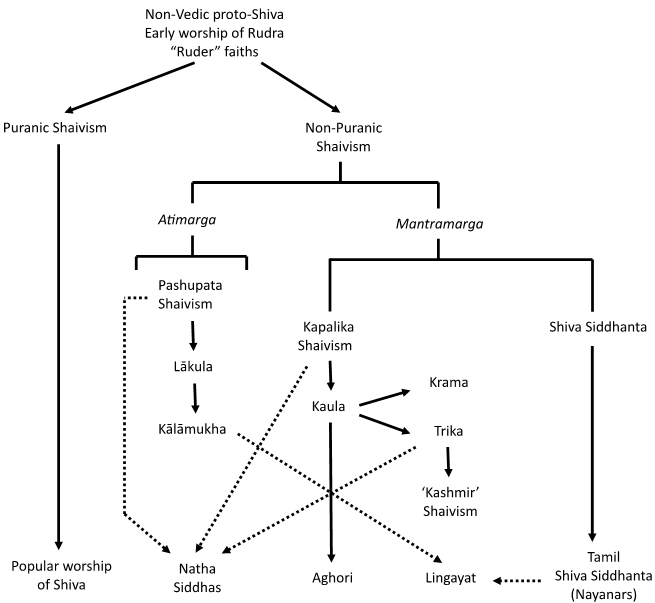
The development of various schools of Shaivism from proto-Shiva and early worship of Rudra.

=== Etymology ===
The translation of the term kula in English is considered difficult and has raised some problems for researchers. The basic meaning is "family", "group" or "self-contained unit". This is explained by Gavin Flood as referring to the retinues of minor goddesses depicted in the schools' literature.

Philosophically the term is said to represent a unifying connectedness, beneath the various objects, processes and living entities of this world, which may be identified with these goddesses as aspects of the supreme deity, in some regions the god Shiva, elsewhere a goddess. Another meaning sometimes given to the term kaula is that of a "group of people" engaged together in the practice of spiritual discipline.

=== Applications of the term ===
While the manifest reality is described as Kula (a variant form of the term Kaula), the unifying factor, the Deity, is termed Akula. "A" means "beyond", or "non", thus "Akula" is "beyond kula". As the substrate of all manifestation is Akula, such is also the basis of any Kula. So Kula families are united by a common substrate, the transcendent Akula.

In every one of its instances, on various levels of the universe, Kula is a contraction (saṃkoca) of totality, thus in each Kula there is a contracted form of the universe, a contracted form of Shiva (Akula) himself. Such an affirmation has been popularized under slogans like "Consciousness is Everything" in some recent Kashmir Shaivism related publications for the public.

Often at the highest level of reality Shiva and Shakti form the supreme couple, or the ultimate Kula (family). Shiva, under various names (anuttara - absolute, prakāśa - uncreated light, cit - supreme consciousness, Akula - beyond the groups of manifestation) and Shakti, under a similar plethora or names (Vimarsa - reflection in consciousness, Visarga - creative energy that emits the Universe, Kundalini - fundamental energy of the body, spanda - atemporal vibration, Kauliki - that which is "sprung" in Kula). The two are always in indissoluble union in a perfect state of bliss. Ultimately there is no difference between Shiva and Shakti, they are different aspects of the same reality. The supreme "family" by definition spans both manifestation and transcendence.

In Kashmir Shaivism, Supreme Consciousness (Cit, identical to Akula) is considered to be the substrate of manifestation. Consciousness is the ultimate principle, the monad of the universe, always present as substrate in every external object, be it gross (physical), subtle (mental) or subtlest (relating to the causal body or soul). Thus external world, body, mind and soul are considered kindred parts of the whole, concretisation of the supreme consciousness. From this perspective, Kula is the totality of manifestation, in gross, subtle and supreme form. Even if Cit is not directly involved in the process of manifestation (as it is said to be unmanifest), it is always present in every possible facet of manifestation. Thus, it is said to be the substantial cause of manifestation (manifestation is made of Cit, "like pots are made of clay") and also the efficient cause ("like the potter is the efficient cause in the activity of creating pots").

A closely related concept is Kaulika, the binding force of the Kula. The term literally means "sprung in Kula". Kaulika is another name for Shakti, the spiritual energy. Shakti, as described in Kashmir Shaivism, does a paradoxical thing – she creates the universe, with all its diversity and at the same time remains identical to Shiva, the absolute transcendent. Thus, Kaulika is an energy both of spirit and matter. Bridging the two, Kaulika creates the path of evolution for consciousness from ego to spirit.

The manifestation of Kaulika proceeds from the absolute (anuttara) in the process of cosmic creation (mahasristi). Thus Kaulika should not be seen as mere energy, or just the link between matter and spirit, but also identical to the absolute. Even if she is the dynamic aspect of the absolute, she does not rank lower than Shiva, her divine consort.

== Subschools ==
Kaula developed into four main systems, known as the Four Transmissions, namely eastern (Pūrvāmnāya; Trika-tradition; goddess Kuleshvari), northern (Uttarāmnāya; Mata and Krama tradition; goddess Kali), western (Paścimāmnāya; goddess Kubjika), and southern (Daksinamnaya; goddess Tripurasundari). (Note: Sanderson (2012–2013, p. 58): "...liturgical systems differentiated most obviously by the identity of the central deity. Thus in an early classification, seen in the Ciñciṇīmata, we are given accounts of four systems of Kaula teaching, called the Āmnāyas (‘Traditions’), assigned to the four directions, east (Pūrvāmnāya), north (Uttarāmnāya), west (Paścimāmnāya), and south (Dakṣiṇāmnāya), each with a distinctive pantheon of worship.")

The Trika texts are closely related to the Kuleśvarī texts and can be considered as a 'domesticised' part of the Kulamaarga. These subcategories emerged as cults with a wide range of practices—some with mild practices involving worship of Siva or Sadashiva as a householder deity while others involved worshiping ferocious goddesses with blood, alcohol and erotic offerings.

== Philosophy ==
Kaula practices are based on tantra, closely related to the siddha tradition and Shaktism (if those siddhas relate themselves to divya or manava streams, one can easily find their texts; if the siddhas belong to the siddha stream proper which relates to daityas and danavas, a curious mind is yet to find something textual about that). Kaula sects are noted for their extreme exponents who recommend the flouting of taboos and social mores as a means of liberation. Such practices were often later toned down to appeal to ordinary householders, as in Kashmiri Shaivism.

The concepts of purity, sacrifice, freedom, the spiritual master (guru) and the heart are core concepts of the Kaula tradition.

=== Purity and impurity ===
In this sacrifice, the wise man should use the very ingredient which is forbidden in the series of scriptures. It is immersed in the nectar-of-the-left. (Tantrāloka)

Actions or objects are not seen impure in themselves, rather the attitude is the determinant factor. Spiritual ignorance is the only impurity and knowledge is pure. As long as one is identified with the supreme consciousness, there is nothing impure. The adept is unaffected by any external impurity and makes use of what is reprehensible to attain transcendence. Here arises the antinomian and asocial character of Kaula and the left-handed forms of tantra.

=== Sacrifice ===
Kaula sacrifice (yajna) is defined primarily as an inward act. Any action performed with the purpose of evoking the supreme reality is said to be sacrifice. However, if sacrifice were performed only interiorly, there would be a lack of externality and therefore limitation and dualism. That is why Kaula adepts also perform symbolic external sacrifices making use of a sacred place and various rituals.

There are six main types of sacrifice according to the "six supports"; external reality, the couple, the body, the central channel of the subtle breath (susumna), the mind and Shakti.

=== Freedom ===
Kaula stresses the language of self-sufficiency, liberation and freedom. Socially the Kaula may be viewed as an alternative society, complete in itself, which supports the freedom of the devotee from interior mental and egotistic limitations and from exterior social and cultural preconceptions.

At a social level deconditioning is realized by detaching from traditional restrictions with regard to what is considered pure and impure and through the adoption of the spiritual family of the guru. At the mental level freedom is attained by the awakening of Kundalini through asana, pranayama, mudra or mantras, the amplification and sublimation of the vital and mental energy and the elevation of consciousness. The culmination of this process is spiritual illumination.

Absolute freedom is to be found only in the revelation of the unity of the spirit with a god/goddess or the Absolute, a state described as Atma-vyapti or re-absorption into the true Self (atman) or Shiva-vyapti: re-absorption into the supreme consciousness of Shiva. To be free is to be absolved from the necessity of rebirth conditioned by karmic constraints. Consciousness expands into pure reality, a level that is considered to exist beyond time and space, where the powers of knowledge and action are unfettered, there are no conditioning desires or needs to be fulfilled and bliss is directly present in consciousness.

Kaula's basic method is the experience of the freedom of consciousness in the heart, ultimately reflected in the center of the being as Khechari Mudra. This mudra (attitude) means "the ability of consciousness to freely move (charati) about in the space (kha) of the heart". The disciple learns to recognize Śiva as the ultimate reality. The practices pertaining to consciousness are explained in such texts as Vijñāna Bhairava Tantra, Spanda Kārikās and Śiva Sūtras.

Kashmiri Shaivism describes freedom as svātantrya - the freedom to create, maintain and destroy the universe pertaining to Śiva himself. It is considered that Śiva, above any restriction or conditioning, creates the universe of his free will as a playful expression of his spirit (lila). Here the kaulas are unlike Advaita and Veda, where there is the conception that maya (cosmic illusion) is superimposed upon the brahman (absolute), inducing a sort of illusory creation. Here, creation is considered real, and the will to create is considered free and unfettered. Svatantrya is identical to Ananda (bliss) and vimarśa (reflexive consciousness/auto-consciousness).

=== Guru ===
"Guru is the path" (gurur upāyaḥ). This statement from the most revered sacred text of Kashmir Shaivism, the Śiva Sutras, summarizes the school's conception of the guru-disciple relationship. Kaula functions as a form of guru yoga, where the disciple's only essential practice is to surrender himself to his guru, accepting the spiritual impulse bestowed upon him by his master. Disciples eminently open towards their guru's spiritual influence are named spiritual sons and held to know the highest state of consciousness by their direct link to their guru's illuminated heart.

The guru is considered to form a single Self (atman) with his disciples. As such, he leads the disciples to the discovery of their own Atman with his own consciousness, exalted into the supreme state.

=== The Heart ===
Aham, the heart or "subjective I", is a central concept in Kaula ideology, conceived of as the most sacred reality, home of consciousness (Cit) and bliss (Ananda), place of union of the cosmic couple Shiva and Shakti. The term Aham refers to the same reality as other terms like anuttara (unsurpassed), Akula (beyond the group), Shiva (The Lord), Cit (supreme consciousness) as well as "feminine" aspects as Ananda and Shakti. Each term brings a specific viewpoint, but none of them can fully describe the Supreme Reality.

On the individual level, the heart is the binding force of all conscious experiences – the individual being is considered a Kula composed of eight elements: five senses, ego (ahamkar), the mind and the intellect. These eight are not disconnected, unrelated processes but rather a unified, interrelated family ("kaula") based on consciousness as the common substrate. Kaula prescribes practices that reintegrate the eight "rays" of the soul into the supreme consciousness.

On the cosmic level, the "Heart of the Lord" (aham) is the substrate of the family of 36 elements forming all manifestation. The concept of "Spiritual Heart" is so important that even the supreme realization in Kashmir Shaivism is described in relation to it. The Khechari Mudra is an attitude described as "the ability of consciousness to freely move (charati) about in the space (kha) of the heart". ("kha"+"charati" forming "kechari")

== Practices ==
Similarly to other tantric schools, Kaula chooses a positive (affirmative) approach: instead of prescribing self-limitations and condemning various actions, it embraces such actions in a spiritual light. Thus, sexuality, love, social life and artistic pursuits are considered vectors of spiritual evolution. The main focus in Kaula is on practical methods for attaining liberation, rather than engaging in complex philosophical debate. Whatever is pleasant and positive can be integrated in its practice.

The principal means employed in the Kaula practice are the spiritual family, the practice of initiation rituals, the couple (sexual rituals such as maithuna), the body (spiritual alchemy inside one's own body), the energy (shakti) (controlled especially through the use of mantras and mystical phonemes) and the consciousness (seen as the epitome of one's whole being and of the universe itself).

The first phase of development is linked to the attainment of a state of non-duality described as an "absorption into the spiritual heart", nirvikalpa samadhi or experiencing the "uncreated light" of consciousness (prakāśa) (read a number of subjective accounts of this experience).

=== Group practice ===
Group practices, which are restricted to the members of a kaula (family), include rituals, festivities, initiations and the secretive tantric sexual union. The purposes of this practice are the initiation of novices, the expansion of consciousness and expression of the bliss already attained as participants become more and more advanced.

The key to the effectiveness of group practice is held to reside in the harmony of minds and hearts of the participants. When a compatible spiritual group is created, it can greatly accelerate the spiritual evolution of its members. Abhinavagupta declares that such a group can enter a state of oneness and universal consciousness without effort. He explains this by the notion of reflection (pratibimba), a process of unification, an effortless overflow of spiritual energy.

The relation between a Kaula's parts is realized through mutual reflection. Reflection (pratibimba) is used here in the sense of "containing an image of the other objects inside", a concept similar to that of the hologram. The number of possible interactions and reflections between the members of a Kaula is much larger than the number of elements it contains. Kashmir Shaivism declares that each part is in fact Akula (Shiva) in essence; thus there is a connection between the parts through their common Akula substrate. As each part contains Akula, in its essence, it automatically contains everything, this is how the mutual reflection is said to be realized.

Almost half of the Tantraloka is dedicated to rituals, usually evoking the union of complementary sets such as man and woman, a faculty and its object or inhalation and exhalation. The practice of ritual may involve the construction of a mandala, visualization of a goddess or group of goddesses (Śakti), recitation (japa), performed in a state of "rest inside the creative awareness" (camatkāra), oblation into fire and its internalized version – the burning of the objects and means of knowledge into the "fire" of non-dual consciousness (parāmarśa).

The power of a ritual lies in its repetition. A pure disciple will attain the supreme state even by simply staying for a short time in presence of a guru without any instruction, but less prepared ones need reinforcement and gradual accumulation.

=== Physical practices ===
Kaula puts a special emphasis on the physical body in spiritual practice "as a vessel of the Supreme" and, as such, not an obstacle tortured in ascetic practices. Repeated submergence into the state of non-duality is supposed to induce secondary effects on the physical body due to the activity of the spiritual energy (śakti) and may be called tantric body alchemy (see internal alchemy). Starting from the expanded consciousness of the self (atman), the body (and in the end, the exterior reality too) is infused with the experience of non-duality.

The non-dual, experienced initially only in consciousness, is extended to the whole body. The kaula adept will discover kaulika – the power (siddhi) of identification with the Universal Consciousness experienced in the physical body, generated spontaneously, without any effort (formal meditation, postures – asana, concentration Dharana and other forms of exertion in yoga). This process is described as the descent of the energy of the non-dual consciousness into the physical. Then consciousness manifests as a free force, entering the senses and producing extroverted samādhi. At this point, consciousness, mind, senses and physical body are "dissolved" into oneness, expanded into the spiritual light of consciousness.

As a consequence, any perception of the exterior reality becomes nondual. It becomes possible to live submerged in a continuous state of union with Shiva even while performing regular day-to-day activities. This form of extroverted, all-inclusive samādhi is the pinnacle of spiritual evolution, bhairavi mudra, jagadananda or bhava samadhi. The yogi experiences everything as pure light and ecstasy (cit-ananda) and does not feel any difference between interior and exterior any more.

==== Yamala – the tantric couple ====
Abhinavagupta: "The couple (yamala) is consciousness itself, the unifying emission and the stable abode. It is the absolute, the noble cosmic bliss consisting of both Shiva and Shakti. It is the supreme secret of Kula; neither quiescent nor emergent, it is the flowing font of both quiescence and emergence." (Tantraloka)

The sexual practices of the Kaula schools, also known as "the secret ritual", are performed with an "external Shakti" (sexual partner) as opposed to the purely meditative practices which involve only one's own spiritual energies (the "interior Shakti"). The role of the sexual Kaula ritual is to unite the couple, yogini (initiated woman) and siddha (initiated man), and induce one in the other a state of permanent awakening. This achievement is made possible by the intensity of their love.

In their exalted state, the two become absorbed into the consciousness of the Self. Becoming united on all the levels, physical, astral, mental and even in their consciousness, they reconstitute the supreme couple of Shiva and Shakti.

The Kaula sacrifice is reserved for the few, the elite who can maintain a state of Bhairava (spiritual illumination) in sexual union. Other couples, even if they reproduce the ritual to the letter (as perceived from outside), if they do not attain Bhairava consciousness, are merely engaging in a sexual act.

"Initiation by the mouth of the yogini (yoginī-vaktra)", is a method by which the adept unites with a purified yoginī and receives the unique experience of the illuminated consciousness. He is to see her as both his lover and guru.

The energy generated during the tantric sexual act is considered a form of "subtle emission", while the act of ejaculation is considered a form of physical emission. In Kashmir Shaivism, the energy of emission (visarga śakti) is considered to be a form of ānanda (bliss).

Depending on the orientation of one's consciousness, introverted or extroverted, emission can be of two kinds: rested and risen. In Śānta, the rested form of emission, focus is absorbed just on one's own Self in an act of transcendence. In Udita, the risen form, the focus is projected on the Self (atman) of one's lover – a state associated with immanence.

Santodita (beyond udita and śānta) is the uniting form, cause of both śānta and udita emissions. Santodita is described as universal bliss (cidānanda), undivided consciousness, kaula (the group of two as one) and an "outflow of the pulsation of Shiva and Shakti". This kind of translation from the physical act to the mental and to consciousness itself is a characteristic of the tantric world view.

=== Mantra practice ===
Mantric meditation is the most common form of tantric practice. In the Kaula system, this practice is associated especially with the group of phonemes. The 50 phonemes (varṇa) of the Sanskrit alphabet are used as "seed" mantras denoting various aspects of consciousness (cit) and energy (śakti). The group (kula) of Sanskrit phonemes form a complete description of reality, from the lowest ("earth") to the highest (Śiva consciousness) level.

The ritual "setting out" of the phonemes imitates the emanation of the cosmos from the supreme I-consciousness of Śiva. In another ritual, the phonemes are identified with specific zones of the body through the practice of nyāsa, infusing the body with spiritual energy. This mystical state of culminates in the kaula of the body (perfection of the ensemble of organs, senses and mind) and such a being is known as a siddha (accomplished one). The adept attains a form of bodily enlightenment where, through the power of mantras, he comes to recognize the divinities within the body.

Initiation into mantric practice is based on a transfer of power and the link (lineage) of the heart. The word or phoneme is not useful in itself, as it does not have efficiency unless the disciple received his initiation from an authentic master.

== Texts ==
Kashmiri School of Kaula

While Kaula is primarily an oral tradition and does not place a high value on the creation of texts, there are some texts associated with the tradition. Muller-Ortega, following Pandey, summarizes the literature of the Kashmiri school as follows:

- Siddha-yogeśvarī-mata-tantra
- Rudra-yāmala-tantra
- Kulārṇava-tantra
- Jñānārṇava
- Nityā-ṣoḍaśika-arṇava
- Svacchanda-tantra
- Netra-tantra
- Tantrarāja-tantra
- Kālīkula

== See also ==
- Left-hand path and right-hand path – Dichotomy between two opposing approaches to magic
- Vamachara – Sanskrit term for heterodox practices

== Sources ==
- Dupuche, John R. (2003), Abhinavagupta: The Kula Ritual, as Elaborated in Chapter 29 of the Tantrāloka, Motilal Banarsidass Publishers, ISBN 81-208-1979-9.
- — (2020), "A Spirituality of Pleasure: The 'Thousand-Year' Intercourse of Śiva and Śakti", in Epple, Nicol Michelle; Shining, Phil (eds.), Exploring Sexuality and Spirituality: An Introduction to an Interdisciplinary Field, At the Interface/Probing the Boundaries, vol. 132, Leiden and Boston: Brill Publishers, pp. 131–162, doi:10.1163/9789004437869_005, ISBN 978-90-04-43079-2, ISSN 1570-7113, LCCN 2020028860, S2CID 242423110
- Flood, Gavin D. (1996), An Introduction to Hinduism, Cambridge: Cambridge University Press, ISBN 0-521-43878-0.
- Lakshman Joo, Swami (1988), Kashmir Shaivism: The Secret Supreme, SUNY Press, ISBN 0-88706-575-9.
- Mallinson, James (2011), "Yoga: Haṭha Yoga", in Basu, Helene; Jacobsen, Knut A.; Malinar, Angelika; Narayanan, Vasudha (eds.), Brill's Encyclopedia of Hinduism, vol. 3, Leiden: Brill Publishers, pp. 770–781, doi:10.1163/2212-5019_BEH_COM_000354, ISBN 978-90-04-17641-6, ISSN 2212-5019 – via Academia.edu
- Muller-Ortega, Paul (1989), The Triadic Heart of Siva, Albany: State University of New York Press, ISBN 0-88706-787-5.
- Pandit, Moti Lal (2003), Trika Saivism of Kashmir, New Delhi: Munshiram Manoharlal, ISBN 81-215-1082-1.
- Sanderson, Alexis (1988). "Saivism and the Tantric Tradition". In Clarke, Peter (ed.). The World's Religions. Routledge.
- Sanderson, Alexis (2012–2013), "The Śaiva Literature" (PDF), Journal of Indological Studies (24 & 25), archived from the original (PDF) on 2016-03-04.
- Silburn, Lilian (1988), Kuṇḍalinī: The Energy of the Depths, State University of New York Press, ISBN 978-0887068003.
- Singh, Jaideva; Swami Lakshman Joo; Bettina Baumer (2005), Paratrisika Vivarana by Abhinavagupta: The Secret of Tantric Mysticism, Motilal Banarsidass Publishers (Pvt. Ltd), ISBN 81-208-0472-4.
