= Abhasavada =

Hindu philosophy term

Abhasavada (Sanskrit: आभासवाद) is the term derived from the word Abhasa meaning mere or fallacious appearance, reflection, looking like, light, semblance of reason, intention. In Hindu philosophy this term refers to the Theory of Appearance, both of the Shaivite school and the Advaita Vedanta, though with differing connotations.

== Kashmir Shaivism ==
The Shaivites rely on Maheshvaraya (Sovereignty of Will) of Shiva, the creator-sustainer-destroyer to explain Creation. Jnanadikara deals with two theories a) Svatantryavada and b) Abhasavada to explain Shiva's volitional power. The whole creation or manifestation is the result of the Kriya Sakti of the Lord who becomes Nirmana Sakti (constituent power) owing to the operation of three laws viz. the law of Division (bheda-bheda), the law of Perception (mana-tat-phala-meya) and the law of Causation (Karya karana, Kriya Sakti). Svatantryavada or the universal voluntarism is the chief doctrine of the Pratyabhijna system; it is the doctrine of self-dependence or sovereignty of the Lord's Will which imparts impetus to the process of the world. It explains the creative power in Nature and multiplication of effect. This theory replaced Arambhavada (theory of Realistic creation), Parinamavada (theory of transformation) and Vivartavada (theory of Manifestation). Abhasavada is the Pratyabhijna's theory of Manifestation, propounded by Utpalacarya and influenced Abhinavagupta, which explains Monism and holds the world objects as manifestations or Abhasas, and the view that it is the very nature of Shiva, the Supreme Cause (Parma Shiva), to manifest Himself in diverse forms of the universe, that the whole universe is an abhasa of Shiva. It recognizes the truth that appearance as appearance or as process of the world, is real, the appearance is not a superimposition on Shiva actively involved in free spontaneous kriya of creation. Prakrti is projection of the free-will of Shiva.

== Advaita Vedanta ==
In the Advaita Vedanta version, Abhasavada, the theory of appearance advocated by Suresvara, holds that the individual soul is merely an illusory appearance – a projection – of Brahman-intelligence. According to this school of thought, at the level of Consciousness Jiva and Ishvara are considered to be mere reflection or appearance of the One Impartite Brahman; because they are identical with Brahman they have no separate identity of their own. Suresvara maintains that Jivas are as real as Brahman, they being primary appearances in and through avidya, while the objects of the world are unreal, they being secondary appearances, the mere reflections of the primary appearances. Reality thus appearing in Avidya is the cause of all further outward appearances by way of phenomenal or empirical entities, recognized as illusions.

Sankara holds the view that Avidya or Maya, the metaphysical Ignorance, is of the nature of a superimposition of Self on the Not-self (Anatman), the real on the real and vice versa, there cannot be superimposition on the empty void. The creation of the universe is nothing but self-creation (Brahma Sutra I.iv.26); Brahman creates all things by apparently transforming Itself into all things.

Pratibimbavada, the theory of reflection, evolved from Abhasavada. Padamapada had as basis the fact that Awareness is identical to the original as in Tat Tvam Asi in which mahavakya there is the identification of anidamamsa (pure Awareness) with Brahman.
