= Vibhu =

Vibhu is a masculine given name. Notable people with the name include:

- Vibhu Bakhru (born 1966), Indian jurist
- Vibhu Puri (born 1980), Indian director and singer
