= Asraya =

Refuge in eastern religions and astrology

Āśraya (Sanskrit: आश्रय) variously means base, source, assistance, shelter, protection, refuge, dependence, having recourse to or depending on. In terms of Hindu philosophy, the living entity or Jiva is āśraya, and Brahman or the Supreme Being, the Godhead, is viśaya, the supreme objective, the goal of life Bhagavata Purana (VII.x.6). But, this word - āśraya conveying the primary meaning – 'refuge', immediately relates with the deity which is worshipped rather than with the abstract Brahman, the substratum of all that exists.

== Hindu view-point ==
Vishishtadvaita Vedanta, which promotes qualified-monism, holds the belief that Jiva is anu or monadic in substance. Jiva though infinitesimal, is the individual atman harboured by a body, which atman the Mundaka Upanishad tells us, to be known by the mind is capable of becoming infinite through its attributive knowledge. Jiva is kartā and bhoktā, both; it is the āśraya for jñāna, the substrate for krti or prayatna (effort) caused by the desire to act. Therefore, Jiva is the āśraya for the states of experience that invariably involve changes in mental disposition without affecting the Jiva.

Shankara does not consider avidyā (ignorance) as something positively existent, he does not speak about its vikśepa-śakti (power of dispersion) or avarna-sakti (power of concealment); he does not raise avidyā to an eternal metaphysical entity. Shankara also does not subscribe to the view that the individual soul is the bearer of avidyā (āśraya) or to the contention that the Paramatman is the āśraya of avidyā as is held by Mandana and Vācaspati. He reiterates that for an awakened person there is no avidyā to delude and cause pain or pleasure. In the context of the origin of the world (the original state is called avyakta) he terms Parameswara-Brahman as the āśraya of nāmarūpe (the physical presence which name manifests) and that Brahman is the āspada (locus) of the cosmic vyavahāra imagined by avidya.

Knowledge implies the subject which knows and the object that is known. Suppression (avarna) precedes substitution (viksepa); avidyā makes one misapprehend and therefore it is described as positive (bhāva-rūpa), and does not contradict vidyā (knowledge). With regard to the transmigrating souls, Shankara does speak about the bhūta- āśraya or elementary substratum or material substratum of the soul, the subtle body, and about the karma- āśraya or moral substratum connected with vāsanās (impressions), karma (works ordained or forbidden) and pūrvaprajñā (previous experience) but he does not accept the existence of subtle persisting elements of works or preparatory elements of fruits called apurva because of their non-spiritual nature.

According to the Bhagavata Purana (one of the 18 Mahapuranas or 18 Major Puranas) the personal aspect of God is the Āśraya of the ātmā.

== Jaina viewpoint ==
Condition of existence (gati), according to Jain philosophy, is the state of a soul shaped by gati-nama-karma (body-condition-making) or is the cause of the soul passing through any one of the four conditions of existence – hellish, sub-human, human and celestial. They subscribe to the view that in a thing which is permanent the existence of sāmānaya and samavāya is complete, that means that common properties cannot exist without individuals possessing them; the individuals are the āśraya; sāmānaya and samavāya is complete in one substance will not exist without āśraya (substratum).

== Buddhist view-point ==
Vasubandhu explains that the āśraya (foundation or support) of the fundamental change that indicates ātmabhāva (psychophysical continuum) is the non-conceptual wisdom free from the duality of the apprehender and the apprehended; āśraya refers to obscured tathagatagarbha (the fourth vajra-point) and its change (tataparāvrtti) which is enlightenment (the fifth vajra-point). It is possible to replace one āśraya with another by freeing the ayatanas (internal and external sense- bases) from physical and mental impregnations of negative tendencies which bring about craving, suffering etc., by cultivating calm abiding and superior insight, which process activates theayatanas associated with awareness (vidyā) that purify all impregnations of negative tendencies and involve raising oneself to śuddhāśrayabhūmi, the level of pure superior intention, never to return to the lower realms or suffer rebirth.

Tathatā is the basis of transcendental wisdom, and Bhūtatathatā is the genuine 'Suchness', the essential nature of phenomenal existence, the self-identical universality, the grounding (āśraya) truth of finite particularity. The Buddhists believe that the skandhas, the ayatanas and the dhātus are the dharmas that constitute the phenomenal world and are the forms (and the conditioning factors) in which consciousness appears to itself. Bhūtatathatā is the āśraya i.e. the basis which is to be transformed (āśraya-paravritti), and also the āśraya which is the result of the transformation. Therefore, it is the āśraya of delusion and awakening. The Mahāyāna-samparigrahaśāshtra tells us that the mind of Reality is ever obstructed by āveṇkī avidyā which is manas, the seventh consciousness and the āśraya of mano-vijñāna and the five sensorial consciousnesses evolved from self-patterning of the Absolute; the attachment of manas to ātmagrāha (egohood) and dharmagrāha (thinghood) makes the perception of the multiplicity of forms possible. The Mahāyāna-abhidharmasutra tells us that the beginningless dhātu (locus) is the equal support (āśraya) of all phenomena (dharma) and rests in the body as seeds. According to the Yogacaras, ātmabhāva and āśraya basically mean – "body", and who also tell us that āśraya-paravritti can be of the mind or path or errant tendencies.

== Hindu astrology ==
Āśarya yoga, a special kind of planetary placement with most planets resting in moveable or fixed or common signs (rāsis), is one of the thirty-two varieties of Nabhasa yogas in which regard Varahamihira tells us –

अनुष्टुभ्-आश्रयोक्तास्तु विफला भवन्त्यन्यैर्विमिश्रताः |
मिश्रा येस्ते फलं दद्युरमिश्राः स्वफलप्रदाः ||

" The Āśarya yogas become ineffective, when they look like other yogas, and those other yogas become operative and bear results. When the Āśarya yogasdo not bear any resemblance with other yogas, it is then that the Āśarya yogas produce results. " – Brihat Jataka (XII.12)
