= Utpaladeva =

Kashmiri Shavite Thinker

Utpaladeva (c. 900–950 CE) was a Shaiva tantrik philosopher, theologian and poet from Kashmir. He belonged to the Trika Shaiva tradition and is a thinker of the Pratyabhijñā school of monistic idealism. His Īśvarapratyabhijñākārikā (IPK, Verses on the Recognition of the Lord) is a central text for the Pratyabhijñā school of Shaiva Hindu philosophy. Utpaladeva was also a tantrik guru and a religious bhakti poet, having authored the influential Śivastotrāvalī (A Garland of Hymns to Śiva), a collection of Shaiva hymns that remain popular with Kashmiri Shaivas.

Utpaladeva was a student of Somānanda (875–925 CE) and an influence on the exegete Abhinavagupta, whose works later overshadowed those of Utpaladeva. However, according to the Indologist Raffaele Torella "most of Abhinavagupta’s ideas are just the development of what Utpaladeva had already expounded."

== Philosophy ==
Torella characterizes Utpaladeva's philosophy as a "unique blend of epistemology, metaphysics, religious experience, linguistic philosophy and aesthetic speculation."

Utpaladeva himself describes the Pratyabhijñā as a "new path" (mārgo navaḥ) in Īśvarapratyabhijñākārikā IV.16, while crediting Somānanda's Śivadṛṣṭi with having first "indicated" it. Although the path draws on the metaphysics of non-dualist Śaivism, it does not appeal to scriptural authorityi i.e. does not require those who follow it to believe in the identity of the self with the absolute consciousness as described in the revealed texts.

In the chapter "Jñānādhikāra" of the Īśvarapratyabhijñā-Kārikā, Utpaladeva aims to establish the existence of a self by emphasizing one's capacity of being a knowing subject. Utpaladeva points to memory, which is a cognitive event that takes place over an extended period of time. An element of current self-awareness is present at the moment of original cognition. The element at both points is a manifestation of a single consciousness and so have the same nature. Utpaladeva opposes a Buddhist explanation of memory that rejects a self. Buddhists explain memory without a permanent knowing self because past cognitions leave latent impressions (saṃskāras) on later cognitions. However, Utpaladeva counters that the original cognition is restricted to itself.

The Īśvarapratyabhijñākārikā presents itself as a rational inquiry relying only on the two means of knowledge accepted by all Indian philosophers: direct experience and inference. Abhinavagupta reads the treatise as a single "inference for others" (parārthānumāna) structured according to the five steps of the classical Nyaya definition: pratijñā, hetu, udāhārana, upanaya, and nigamana.

=== Theology ===
For Utpaladeva, the supreme reality, Shiva, is "an absolute I", the atman, a singular subject or consciousness. As Torella notes, Utpaladeva constantly works to prove, contra the Buddhists, that there is "a single, dynamic subject that unifies and animates the discontinuity of reality and constitutes the substratum of every limited subject, as well as of every form and activity of everyday life."

Utpaladeva's view of God is stated in the Īśvarapratyabhijñā-Kārikā:

There is only one Great Divinity, and it is the very inner Self of all creatures. It embodies itself as all things, full of unbroken awareness of three kinds: “I”, “this”, and “I am this.”

According to Torella, another important and original contribution of Utpaladeva is his doctrine of "abhasas" (light, radiance, manifestations), which sees everything as radiant manifestations of the consciousness of Shiva which is their necessary foundation. Each "manifestation" is a kind of universal and is connected with a specific Sanskrit word. Torella also notes however that the term abhasa was not a new term "but was commonly used in the Vedantic and Buddhist schools." Torella explains Utpaladeva's view of God as follows:

This I or Consciousness is, on the religious plane, Siva. In his highest form, the supreme divine personality is solely 'I' - consisting of consciousness and beatitude - in whom all the principles are contained though in a state of complete dissolution. He is present throughout the IPK as the ultimate essence of every reality and is also directly mentioned here and there, even if the stage is generally occupied by a less extreme form of him, which balances between transcendence and immanence. In fact, being an expository work, which requires an object to teach and a recipient of this teaching; it cannot but deal with that form of the God which is open to the world of manifestation, whilst firmly remaining its sovereign. On the supreme plane there is only the I resting in his fullness and no trace of the knowable remains...this more accessible form of the God is connected with the second level. It is mainly indicated as Mahesvara, Isvara, Isa, Prabhu, whereas the supreme form is often given the name of Siva or Paramesvara, but there certainly are exchanges between these two series - which indirectly points out the fact that it is a question of a sole reality and that every distinction of degree and figure is purely instrumental to the expository requirements.

This supreme reality expresses itself through a scale of tattvas (reality) in a manner similar to that of Shaivasiddhanta philosophy (all the while remaining thoroughly monistic in character).

Utpaladeva also provided an argument for the existence of God (Ishvara) which was at least partly drawn on Nyaya sources. According to Isabelle Ratie, this argument states that "the universe is an effect consisting of a specific arrangement that must have been created by an intelligent agent considered as its efficient cause." Furthermore, for Utpaladeva, given the complexity and harmony of the universe, this creator must be omniscient and omnipotent.

=== Recognition ===
As Torella notes, the key element in Utpaladeva's theology of liberation is the idea of "recognition" (pratyabhijñā) and how to achieve it. This is none other than the act of recognizing that oneself is the supreme Shiva himself. As Torella explains, recognition is:

merely the triggering in the devout of an act of identification, which does not reveal anything new but only rends the veils that hid the I from himself; a cognition is not created but only the blur that prevented its use, its entering into life, is instantly removed. The way by which the master creates the premises for this to occur may, on the contrary, be gradual: this is what Utp. does with his work, which aims through a series of arguments at bringing to light the powers of the I and those of the Lord, until identification is triggered. The practice of such a linear (avakra) path is enough to enter into the nature of Siva and achieve the condition of liberated in life, which may also be accompanied by the extraordinary powers...This occurs within everyday reality just as it is. The light of liberation does not cause its colours to fade, does not cover them but brightens them, performing the miracle of eliminating otherness whilst maintaining the richness of individual flavours.

The opening verse of the Īśvarapratyabhijñākārikā states that Utpaladeva composed it out of a wish to help "people" (jana). Abhinavagupta glosses this word as "whoever is born" and explains that the Pratyabhijñā places no restriction on who is qualified (adhikārin) to receive its teaching; commenting on the final verse, he adds that no requisite such as caste (jāti) applies. Both Utpaladeva and Abhinavgupta set themselves against orthodoxy the quest for one's true identity is not a privilege tied to the caste or sex of the person who undertakes it.

=== The influence of Buddhism ===
Utpaladeva's philosophy draws on and at the same time criticizes the work of the Buddhist Vijñanavada school of pramana, particularly that of Dharmakīrti. Torella writes that "the criticism of their positions is to Utpaladeva of a substantial help in building and refining the Pratyabhijñā philosophy." While Utpaladeva agrees with the Buddhist critique of the Nyaya categories and uses many of their philosophical tools, he sees their system as lacking an understanding of the supreme lord Śiva, which is "the omnipervasive dynamism of a free and “personal” consciousness."

Torella writes that Utpaladeva's examination and criticism of the Dignaga-Dharmakirti school of Buddhism "resulted in, or at least was accompanied by, the peculiar phenomenon of a more or less conscious absorption of their doctrines and their terminology, that was to leave substantial traces in the structure of the Pratyabhijñá." This may have also been a way for Utpaladeva to increase the prestige of his school by adopting some of the ways of a respected opponent. Some of the Buddhist ideas which are borrowed and developed by Utpaladeva are the theories of anupalabdhi and apoha.

=== The linguistic nature of reality ===
Utpaladeva also draws on the linguistic metaphysics of the grammarian Bhartr̥hari, which sees knowledge and reality as pervaded with language. Thus, for Utpaladeva, ultimate reality is a free consciousness that is also linguistic in nature. As Torella writes, Utpaladeva sees an "inevitable presence of language at the heart of every cognitive activity."

As Utpaladeva states in some of the most famous verses of his Īśvarapratyabhijñā-Kārikā:

The essential nature of light is reflective awareness; otherwise light, though ‘coloured’ by objects, would be similar to an insentient reality, such as the crystal and so on. - I.V.11 Consciousness has as its essential nature reflective awareness; it is the supreme Word that arises freely. It is freedom in the absolute sense, the sovereignty of the supreme Self. - I.V.13

=== Other contributions ===
Utpaladeva had an universalistic view of scriptures and religion in general. According to Torella, for Utpaladeva, Āgama (scripture) is the voice of Shiva, and "it comprises all the existing Āgamas, from the Vaiṣṇava to the Buddhist (the Śaiva included)."

Utpaladeva also wrote on aesthetics. According to Torella, "Precisely to Utpaladeva we do owe the entrance of aesthetics into philosophical–religious speculation. His concept of camatkāra (wondrous enjoyment) marks a higher level of experience, which leaves the reality and beauty of the manifested world intact, but at same time projects it into a totality whose centre is Supreme Consciousness."

== Works ==
In the concluding verse of the Īśvarapratyabhijñākārikā (IV.18), Utpaladeva names himself "Utpala, son of Udayākara" (udayākarasūnu) and states that he has expounded the Recognition of the Lord "so that people may attain realization without effort".

Utpaladeva wrote various works:

- Śivadṛṣṭivrtti, a commentary on Somānanda's Śivadṛṣṭi
- Śivastotrāvalī (A Garland of Hymns to Śiva)
- Īśvarapratyabhijñākārikā (Verses on the Recognition of the Lord)
- Īśvarapratyabhijnākārikāvritti, a commentary on the Īśvarapratyabhijñākārikā
- Īśvarapratyabhijnāvivriti, a longer commentary on the Īśvarapratyabhijñākārikā only surviving in fragmentary form
- Siddhitrayī (“Three Proofs”), a trilogy of philosophical works consisting of Īshvarasiddhi (“Proof of the Lord”), Ajadapramātrisiddhi (“Proof of a Subject who is not Insentient”), and Sambandhasiddhi (“Proof of Relation”)
