= Svatantrya =

Kashmiri Shaivite concept of divine sovereignty

Svātantrya (from the Sanskrit sva meaning self and tantram meaning dependence – 'self-dependency', or 'free will') is the Kashmiri Shaivite concept of divine sovereignty. Svātantrya is described as an energy that emanates from the Supreme (Paramaśiva), a wave of motion inside consciousness (spanda) that acts as the fundament of the world, or in another view, the original word (logos, pārāvak). It does not use any external instrument as it itself is the first stage of creation.

In antithesis with the Vedantic concept of Brahman, which is a mere conscious witness without effective power, being inflicted by the illusory power (or maya of the Brahman), in the Kashmiri Shaivite viewpoint creation is actively willed into existence by the supreme consciousness (Śiva) by the means of his irresistible will-force (Svātantrya). This is an important aspect of the Pratyabhijna school of Kashmir Shaivism.

Svātantrya is a concept that goes to the root of many spiritual matters in Kashmir Shaivism, like, the divine sovereignty of Śiva (God), consciousness (caitanya), creative power (vimarśa), mantric efficiency and Kundalini.

== Divine sovereignty ==
In its acception of divine sovereignty, svātantrya is described as an absolute power of action, or, absolute power of freedom. This power arises from the mirror-like ability of the supreme consciousness (caitanya) to contain images (vimarśa) – the whole universe being a mere image shining inside this unique god-consciousness.

Svātantrya has a number of traditional attributes such as: perfect fullness (of the energy of will), self-sufficiency, autodetermination, the power of doing and undoing – essence of the subject, supreme creativity, sovereignty, source of knowledge (jñāna) and action (kriyā) and being beyond contradictions: it exists beyond laws of any kind and is the source of all laws in the universe.

== Supreme creative energy ==
The Kashmir Shaivism theory of creation affirms that the world was willed into existence by the sovereign force of Śiva. Thus, the world has no external causes outside Śiva's Svātantrya. This power creates multiplicity (māyā) from the original unity of the absolute, and as such, it exists inside and beyond māyā. It is the seed of the universe, the matrix (mātrkā) of generative phonemes, the ultimate creative force.

== In relation to consciousness ==
Disclaimer: on this topic there is a certain amount of melding and unification of the seemingly distinct concepts of will, freedom, consciousness, speech and bliss in the speciality texts. This is due to the insufficient ability of common language to describe the mystical states of consciousness.

The prakāśa-vimarśa theory affirms the world is based on two principles: the self shining conscious light (prakāśa) and its ability to contain a reflection of itself and of the creation (vimarśa). To reflect itself is to know absolute bliss (ānanda) – thus, free will (svātantrya), conscious reflection (vimarśa) and bliss (ānanda) are three concepts describing the same reality. Bliss (ānanda) is the internal state of consciousness, its natural state. The same is true of svātantrya: it too is a fundamental quality of the subject.

Svātantrya is the first stage of creation, an undifferentiated energy, or, looking from bottom up, we could also say that it is the force that unifies all the energies of creation. The first creation of svātantrya is the energy of will (icchā śakti). Then come the energies of knowledge (jñāna śakti) and action (kriyā śakti) and together with the energy of consciousness (cit śakti) and the energy of bliss (ānanda śakti) they form the supreme pentad of creation, the so-called "pure creation".

Everything related to consciousness is also related to svātantrya. Speech is seen in Kashmir Shaivism as differentiated in four classes : external (vaikharī), mental (madhyamā), subtle (paśyanti) and supreme (parā). Svātantrya is equated to pārāvak, the creative logos / logos spermatikos.

== In relation to mystical practices ==
In the mystical practices of Kashmir Shaivism, svātantrya is both the sovereign will of Śiva, solely deciding the descent of divine grace (śaktipāt) and the will of the adept as s/he becomes more and more submerged into the divine.

According to Kashmir Shaivism, spiritual realization is more than a state of illumination (defined as pure witness, non-dual consciousness or atma-vyapti). Full spiritual realization means to know bliss (ānanda) and to control the energies (śakti) and the mantras (or, the so-called śiva-vyāpti). The root of spiritual efficiency is svātantrya, the operative, dynamic aspect of the absolute.

An adept who reaches spiritual illumination needs to learn how to stabilize the experience. The Kashmir Shaivism scriptures declare that stability is based on the assimilation of the energy of svātantrya. Thus, while the incipient practitioner aims for the experience of the nondual consciousness, more advanced ones focus on the assimilation of all the energies into non-duality. Svātantrya being the root of all energies, it becomes automatically the final step of the spiritual practice.

The will of such an advanced practitioner becomes more and more efficient as it identifies with the will of Śiva. Resulting actions are necessarily without base in egoism (without the attributes of good or bad) – and this is an attitude that defines the discipline of karma yoga.

All the spiritual paths (upāyas): that of Śiva (śāmbhavopāya), that of Śakti (śāktopāya) and that of the human (āṇavopāya) are subsumed under the umbrella of svātantrya as it is the sole mediator of divine grace. The adept who has attained svātantrya is beyond the need for formal meditation – that is – to meditate or to act in everyday life is identical – all actions emerge from a state of perfect unity with Śiva from now on. This is the culmination of the Kashmiri Shaivite spiritual practice. Such an adept does not need to expend energy to maintain this state of consciousness because it has become natural. From this point of view, everything is made of forms of consciousness, identified with the consciousness of Śiva at this stage. This energy is the risen form of Kundalini. The practitioner's mantras have spiritual efficacy. The practitioner's heart (hṛdaya) is the receptacle of all objects.

Kashmir Shaivism doctrine affirms that nothing can compel Śiva to bestow the final spiritual realization – it is solely based on the unconditioned svātantrya, or, from the opposite perspective, there is no obstacle that can separate the disciple from becoming one with Śiva because s/he has svātantrya which is the ultimate power that cannot be impeded by anything. Thus, in Kashmir Shaivism there is this paradoxical concept that nothing needs to be done, as the supreme realization can appear without effort, but also, no matter what effort one undertakes, one cannot compel Śiva to liberate anyone (ātman). This is not an invitation to abandon hard work but a justification for humility.

In a meditation prescribed in Vijñana Bhairava Tantra, one is supposed to unite vital energy (prāṇa) with svātantrya in the mystical force center that exists 12 finger widths above the head, dvadaśānta.

== Alternative names ==
Svātantrya has a number of synonyms such as: maheśvaraya (from maheśvara which means supreme lord), or aiśvarya (similarly, from the word Iśvara which also means Lord). It has been personalized as the Goddess (Devi), the virginal feminine deity Uma (virginity being a symbol of existence outside the reach of the profane world) and the playful goddess Kumārī. Other scriptures also refer to svātantrya as the Glory of Siva on account of it being identical to the 'ocean' of uncreated light (prakāśa) and cosmic bliss (ānanda) – cidānanda-Ghana.
