= Tantrāloka =

Treatise by Abhinavagupta about tantrism

Tantrāloka (Sanskrit: तन्त्रालोक, romanized: tantrāloka, lit. 'Elucidation of Tantra') is a treatise of Abhinavagupta, a writer and philosopher of the Trika-school of Kashmir Shaivism.

== Overview ==
The work contains the synthesis of the 64 monistic āgamas and the different schools of tantra. It discussed both ritualistic and philosophic aspects in 37 chapters; the first chapter contains the essential teachings in condensed form. On account of its size and scope it is considered an encyclopedia of the nondual school of Hindu tantra. A more abridged and concise version of the Tantrāloka, also written by Abhinavagupta, is the Tantrasāra.

Tantrāloka was written in the 10th century and gained greater worldwide prominence towards the end of the 19th century with the publishing and distribution of the Kashmiri Series of Texts and Studies and prominence of Swami Lakshmanjoo, who taught the text and its oral tradition to scholars and seekers alike.

Its complete translation into Italian, edited by Raniero Gnoli, is now at its second edition. The Universal Shaiva Fellowship published Swami Lakshmanjoo's revelation and discussion of Tantrāloka Chapter 1-4, in three volumes (2017, 2021, 2023). The esoteric chapter 29 on the Kaula ritual was translated in English together with Jayaratha's commentary by John R. Dupuche. In 2023, Mark Dyczkowski published a complete translation into English with Jayaratha's commentary. In 2024, Christian de Vietri published Trika Maṇḍala Prakāśa, the first comprehensive exposition of the Trika mandalas described by Abhinavagupta in the Tantrāloka.

A complex study on the context, authors, contents and references of Tantrāloka was published by Navjivan Rastogi, Prof. of the Lucknow University. The last recognized master of the oral tradition of Kashmir Shaivism, Swami Lakshmanjoo, gave a condensed version of the key philosophical chapters of Tantrāloka in his book, Kashmir Shaivism: The Secret Supreme. These chapters cover the: 36 elements (tattvas), six paths (ṣaḍadhvan), four means of realization (upāyas), three impurities (malas), states and processes of the seven perceivers (pramātṛin), five acts of Śiva including his grace (śaktipāta), five states of the individual subjective body, seven states of turiya, fivefold contacts of masters and disciples, various modes of Kuṇḍalinī rising, and the theories of the alphabet (mātṛikācakra), reflection (pratibimbavādaḥ), liberation (mokṣa), and speech (vāk), along with discussions about the origins of the tantras and the differences between Kashmir Śaivism and Advaita Vedānta.
