= Aham (Kashmir Shaivism) =

Concept of Kashmir Shaivism

Aham, a concept of Kashmir Shaivism, is defined as the supreme heart (hṛdayam), transcendent Self, supreme I awareness or infinite consciousness.

== Substrate of creation ==
When Śiva wants to create, the first step is said to be the creation of an interior space (the space of his heart) - a matrix of energies that will be the substrate of the new world. This place is called Aham which means "I" in Sanskrit. Thus the absolute first creates the divine person, Aham, and from this divine person will appear the manifestation itself.

Aham is identical to mātṛkā (the wheel of phonematic energies), essential nature of all categories from Pṛithvī tattva (earth) to Sadāśiva tattva. Aham is the final resting place, dwelling place, abode of all beings, receptacle of the world.

== Ultimate mantra ==
Another definition of Aham is that of primordial mantra, transcendental mantra, the so-called heart-bīja (mantra of the heart) - force and power of consciousness. As the supreme mantra, Aham is closely related to matravīrya (the potency of mantra). Thus the realization of Aham confers power over any mantra.

== United form of Shiva and Shakti ==
In Aham, the supreme (para) aspect of Śakti is realized. Aham is the Śakti of Śiva or in other words, the expansion of Śiva. Another way of describing Aham is as the union of Śiva and Śakti, the emotive(visarga) aspect of the Supreme (anuttara).

== Etymology ==
Aham is formed of A+HA+M, a triad of Śiva (A), Śakti (HA) and bindu (M). M is the final point, union of Śiva and Śakti, where they dissolve into Paramaśiva. The triangle of A+HA+M is the essence of the Trika system. A+HA+M form the sṛṣṭi bīja (seed of emission), a mantra that is identical to the energy of expansion and creation.

Aham can also be defined as: A = abheda (non-differentiation), HA = bheda (differentiation) and M = bhedābheda (differentiation cum non-differentiation).

== Maha, the mirror image of Aham ==
On the other hand, Maha, mirror image of Aham, is formed of Ma+Ha+A, and represents the saṃhara bīja (seed of reabsorption) - the mantra that is identical to the process of spiritual evolution, or in other words reabsorption of the manifestation back into the absolute. In Maha, Śakti (Ha) enters bindu (M) (the limited being) and reunites it with the Supreme (A).

== See also ==
- Ramana Maharshi
- The 36 tattvas
- Purusha
