= Abhinavagupta =

Indian philosopher and writer (c.950–1016)

- Abhinavagupta in a yogic posture

Personal life
- Born: Shankara c. 950 CE Kashmir
- Died: c. 1016 CE Mangam, Kashmir
- Notable work: Tantrāloka etc
- Known for: Doctrine of Vibration (spanda)

Religious life
- Religion: Hinduism
- Creed: Kashmir Shaivism

Religious career
- Influenced: Śambhunātha, Lakṣmaṇagupta, Bhūtirāja

Abhinavagupta (Devanāgarī अभिनवगुप्तः; c. 950 – 1016 CE) was a philosopher, mystic and aesthetician from Kashmir. He was also considered an influential musician, poet, dramatist, exegete, theologian, and logician – a polymathic personality who exercised strong influences on Indian culture.

Abhinavagupta was born in a Kānyakubja Brāhmin family of scholars and mystics whose ancestors immigrated from Kannauj on invitation by the great king of Kashmir, Lalitaditya Muktapida. He studied all the schools of philosophy and art of his time under the guidance of as many as fifteen (or more) teachers and gurus. In his long life he completed over 35 works, the largest and most famous of which is Tantrāloka, an encyclopedic treatise on all the philosophical and practical aspects of Kaula and Trika (known today as Kashmir Shaivism). Another one of his very important contributions was in the field of philosophy of aesthetics with his famous Abhinavabhāratī commentary of Nāṭyaśāstra of Bharata Muni.

== Life ==
"Abhinavagupta" was not his real name, rather a title he earned from his Guru, meaning "competence and authoritativeness". In his analysis, Jayaratha (1150–1200 AD) – who was Abhinavagupta's most important commentator – also reveals three more meanings: "being ever vigilant", "being present everywhere" and "protected by praises". Raniero Gnoli, the only Sanskrit scholar who completed a translation of Tantrāloka in a European language, mentions that "Abhinava" also means "new", as a reference to the ever-new creative force of his mystical experience.

From Jayaratha, we learn that Abhinavagupta was in possession of all the six qualities required for the recipients of the tremendous level of śaktipāta, as described in the sacred texts (Śrīpūrvaśāstra): an unflinching faith in God, realisation of mantras, control over objective principles (referring to the 36 tattvas), successful conclusion of all the activities undertaken, poetic creativity and spontaneous knowledge of all disciplines.

Abhinavagupta's creation is well equilibrated between the branches of the triad (Trika): will (icchā), knowledge (jñāna), action (kriyā); his works also include devotional songs, academical/philosophical works and works describing ritual/yogic practices.

As an author, he is considered a systematiser of the philosophical thought. He reconstructed, rationalised and orchestrated the philosophical knowledge into a more coherent form, assessing all the available sources of his time.

Various contemporary scholars have characterised Abhinavagupta as a "brilliant scholar and saint", "the pinnacle of the development of Kaśmir Śaivism" and "in possession of yogic realization".

== Social background, family and disciples ==
=== "Magical" birth ===
The term by which Abhinavagupta himself defines his origin is "yoginībhū", 'born of a yoginī'. In Kashmir Shaivism and especially in Kaula it is considered that a progeny of parents "established in the divine essence of Bhairava", is endowed with exceptional spiritual and intellectual prowess. Such a child is supposed to be "the depository of knowledge", who "even as a child in the womb, has the form of Shiva", to enumerate but a few of the classical attributes of his kind.

=== Parents ===
Abhinavagupta was born in Kashmir, into a Kanyakubja Brahmin migrant family from the Kannauj region. His mother, Vimalā (Vimalakalā) died when Abhinavagupta was just two years old; as a consequence of losing his mother, to whom he was reportedly very attached, he grew more distant from worldly life and focused all the more on spiritual endeavour.

The father, Narasiṃhgupt, after his wife's death favoured an ascetic lifestyle, while raising his three children. He had a cultivated mind and a heart "outstandingly adorned with devotion to Mahesvara (Shiva)". In Abhinavagupta's own words his father was his first teacher, instructing him in grammar, logic and literature.

=== Family ===
Abhinavagupta had a brother and a sister. His brother, Manoratha, was a well-versed devotee of Shiva. His sister, Ambā (probable name, according to Navjivan Rastogi), devoted herself to worship after the death of her husband in late life.

His cousin Karṇa demonstrated even from his youth that he grasped the essence of Śaivism and was detached of the world. His wife was presumably Abhinavagupta's older sister Ambā, who looked with reverence upon her illustrious brother. Ambā and Karṇa had a son, Yogeśvaridatta, who was precociously talented in yoga

Abhinavagupta also refers to his disciple Rāmadeva as faithfully devoted to scriptural study and serving his master. Another cousin was Kṣema, possibly the same as Abhinavagupta's illustrious disciple Kṣemarāja. Mandra, a childhood friend of Karṇa, was their host in a suburban residence; he was considered not only rich and in possession of a pleasing personality, but also equally learned. And last but not least, Vatasikā, Mandra's aunt, who got a special mention from Abhinavagupta for caring for him with exceptional dedication and concern; to express his gratitude, Abhinavagupta declared that Vatasikā deserved the credit for the successful completion of his work.

=== Ancestors ===
By Abhinavagupta's own account, his most remote known ancestor was called Atrigupta, born in antarved Kānyakubja in Madhyadesha, i.e. the Middle Country. From Madhyadeśa he travelled to Kashmir at the request of king Lalitāditya, around year 740 CE.

== Masters ==
Abhinavagupta is famous for his voracious thirst for knowledge. To study he took many teachers (as many as fifteen), both mystical philosophers and scholars. He approached Vaiṣṇavas, Buddhists, Śiddhānta Śaivists, and the Trika scholars.

Among the most prominent of his teachers, he enumerates four, two of whom were Vāmanātha, who instructed him in dualistic Śaivism, and Bhūtirāja in the dualist/nondualist school. Besides being the teacher of the famous Abhinavagupta, Bhūtirāja was also the father of two eminent scholars.

Lakṣmaṇagupta, a direct disciple of Utpaladeva, in the lineage of Trayambaka, was highly respected by Abhinavagupta and taught him all the schools of monistic thought: Krama, Trika, and Pratyabhijña (except Kula). Śambhunātha taught him the fourth school (Ardha-trayambaka). This school is in fact Kaula, and it was emanated from Trayambaka's daughter.

For Abhinavagupta, Śambhunātha was the most admired guru. Describing the greatness of his master, he compared Śambhunātha to the Sun, in his power to dispel ignorance from the heart, and, in another place, with "the Moon shining over the ocean of Trika knowledge." Abhinavagupta received Kaula initiation through Śambhunātha's wife (acting as a dūtī or conduit). The energy of this initiation is transmitted and sublimated into the heart and finally into consciousness. Such a method is difficult but very rapid and is reserved for those who shed their mental limitations and are pure. It was Śambhunātha who requested he write Tantrāloka. As guru, he had a profound influence in the structure of Tantrāloka and in the life of its creator, Abhinavagupta.

As many as twelve more of his principal teachers are enumerated by name but without details. It is believed that Abhinavagupta had more secondary teachers. Moreover, during his life he had accumulated a large number of texts from which he quoted in his magnum opus, in his desire to create a syncretic, all-inclusive system, where the contrasts of different scriptures could be resolved by integration into a superior perspective.

== Lifestyle ==
Abhinavagupta remained unmarried all his life, and as an adept of Kaula, at least initially maintained brahmacharya and supposedly used the vital force of his energy (ojas) to deepen his understanding of the spiritual nervous system he outlined in his works—a system involving ritual union between Purusha (as Shiva) and Shakti. Such union is essentially non-physical and universal, and thus Abhinavagupta conceived himself as always in communion with Shiva-Shakti. In the context of his life and teachings, Abhinavagupta parallels Shiva as both ascetic and enjoyer.

Abhinavagupta studied assiduously at least until the age of thirty or thirty-five. To accomplish that he travelled, mostly inside Kashmir. By his own testimony, he had attained spiritual liberation through his Kaula practice, under the guidance of his most admired master, Śambhunātha. He lived in his home (functioning as an ashram) with his family members and disciples, and he did not become a wandering monk, nor did he take on the regular duties of his family, but lived out his life as a writer and a teacher. Abhinavagupta's personality was described as a living realisation of his vision.

In an epoch pen-painting, Abhinavagupta is depicted seated in Vīrāsana, surrounded by devoted disciples and family, performing a kind of trance-inducing music on a veena while dictating verses of Tantrāloka to one of his attendees--behind him two dūtī (female yogīs) waiting on him. A legend about the moment of his death (placed somewhere between 1015 and 1025, depending on the source), says that he took with him 1,200 disciples and marched off to a cave, today this cave is known by (Abhinavagupta Cave) located at hill called Bairam at Beerwah, reciting his poem Bhairava-stava, a devotional work. They were never to be seen again, supposedly translating together into the spiritual world.

== Works ==
The trident (triśūlābja-maṇḍala), symbol and yantra of Parama Shiva, representing the triadic energies of parā, parā-aparā and aparā śakti

Abhinavagupta's works fall into multiple sections: manuals of religious ritual, devotional songs, philosophical works and philosophy of aesthetics. Here are enumerated most of his works. Bold type faced titles represent the most important ones.

=== Religious works ===
==== Tantraloka ====
His most important work was Tantrāloka ("Elucidation of Tantra"), a synthesis of the entire Trika system. The esoteric chapter 29 on the Kaula ritual was translated in English together with Jayaratha's commentary by John R. Dupuche. A complex study on the context, authors, contents and references of Tantrāloka was published by Navjivan Rastogi, Prof. of the Lucknow University. The first complete English translation of Tantrāloka was published by the Indologist Mark S. G. Dyczkowski in 2023 after 45 years of work. The last recognized master of the oral tradition of Kashmir Shaivism, Swami Lakshman Joo, gave a condensed version of the key philosophical chapters of Tantrāloka in his book, Kashmir Shaivism – The Secret Supreme.

Another important text was the commentary on Parātrīśikā, Parātrīśikāvivaraṇa, detailing the signification of the phonematic energies and their two sequential ordering systems, Mātṛkā and Mālinī. This was the last major translation project of Jaideva Singh.

==== Tantrasara ====
Tantrasāra ("Essence of Tantra") is a summarised version, in prose, of Tantrāloka, which was once more summarised in Tantroccaya, and finally presented in a very short summary form under the name of Tantravaṭadhānikā – the "Seed of Tantra".

Pūrvapañcikā was a commentary of Pūrvatantra, alias Mālinīvijaya Tantra, lost to this day. Mālinīvijayā-varttika ("Commentary on Mālinīvijaya") is a versified commentary on Mālinīvijaya Tantra's first verse. Kramakeli, "Krama's Play" was a commentary of Kramastotra, now lost. Bhagavadgītārtha-saṃgraha which translates "Commentary on Bhagavad Gita" has now an English translation by Boris Marjanovic.

Other religious works are: Parātrīśikā-laghuvṛtti, "A Short Commentary on Parātrīśikā", Paryantapañcāśīkā ("Fifty Verses on the Ultimate Reality"), Rahasyapañcadaśikā ("Fifteen Verses on the Mystical Doctrine"), Laghvī prakriyā ("Short Ceremony"), Devīstotravivaraṇa ("Commentary on the Hymn to Devi") and Paramārthasāra ("Essence of the Supreme Reality").

=== Devotional hymns ===
Abhinavagupta has composed a number of devotional poems, most of which have been translated into French by Lilian Silburn:

- Bodhapañcadaśikā – "Fifteen Verses on Consciousness";
- Paramārthacarcā – "Discussion on the Supreme Reality";
- Anubhavanivedana – "Tribute of the Inner Experience";
- Anuttarāṣṭikā – "Eight Verses on Anuttara";
- Krama-stotra – an hymn, different from the fundamental text of the Krama school;
- Bhairava-stava – "Hymn to Bhairava";
- Dehasthadevatācakra-stotra – "Hymn to the Wheel of Divinities that Live in the Body";
- Paramārthadvādaśikā – "Twelve Verses on the Supreme Reality" and
- Mahopadeśa-viṃśatikā – "Twenty Verses on the Great Teaching".
- Another poem Śivaśaktyavinābhāva-stotra – "Hymn on the Inseparability of Shiva and Shakti" was lost.

=== Philosophical works ===
One of the most important works of Abhinavagupta is Īśvarapratyabhijñā-vimarśini ("Commentary to the Verses on the Recognition of the Lord") and Īśvarapratyabhijñā-vivṛti-vimarśini ("Commentary on the explanation of Īśvarapratyabhijñā"). This treatise is fundamental in the transmission of the Pratyabhijña school (the branch of Kashmir Shaivism based on direct recognition of the Lord) to our days.

The Īśvarapratyabhijñā-vimarśinī was in turn commented on by Bhāskarakaṇṭha, whose commentary (the Bhāskarī) Alexis Sanderson dates to the end of the 17th century, against K. C. Pandey's earlier proposal of the late 18th century; a further late commentary on it, the Vyākhyā, remained unpublished as of 2011.The Vimarśinī has been printed twice, in the Kashmir Series of Texts and Studies (1918–1921) and, together with the Bhāskarī and Pandey's English translation, at Allahabad (1938–1954).

Another commentary on a Pratyabhijña work – Śivadṛṣtyā-locana ("Light on Śivadṛṣṭi") – is now lost. Another lost commentary is Padārthapraveśa-nirṇaya-ṭīkā and Prakīrṇkavivaraṇa ("Comment on the Notebook") referring to the third chapter of Vākyapadīya of Bhartrihari. Two more philosophical texts of Abhinavagupta are Kathāmukha-tilaka ("Ornament of the Face of Discourses") and Bhedavāda-vidāraṇa ("Confrontation of the Dualist Thesis").

=== Poetical and dramatic works ===
Abhinavaguptas most important work on the philosophy of art is Abhinavabhāratī – a long and complex commentary on Natya Shastra of Bharata Muni. This work has been one of the most important factors contributing to Abhinavagupta's fame up until present day. His most important contribution was that to the theory of rasa (aesthetic savour).

Other poetical works include: Ghaṭa-karpara-kulaka-vivṛti, a commentary on "Ghaṭakarpara" of Kalidasa; Kāvyakauṭukavivaraṇa, a "Commentary to the Wonder of Poetry" (a work of Bhaṭṭa Tauta), now lost; and Dhvanyālokalocana, "Illustration of Dhvanyāloka", which is a famous work of Anandavardhana.
