= Shmashana Adhipati =

Deity of the cremation ground in Hinduism and Tibetan Buddhism

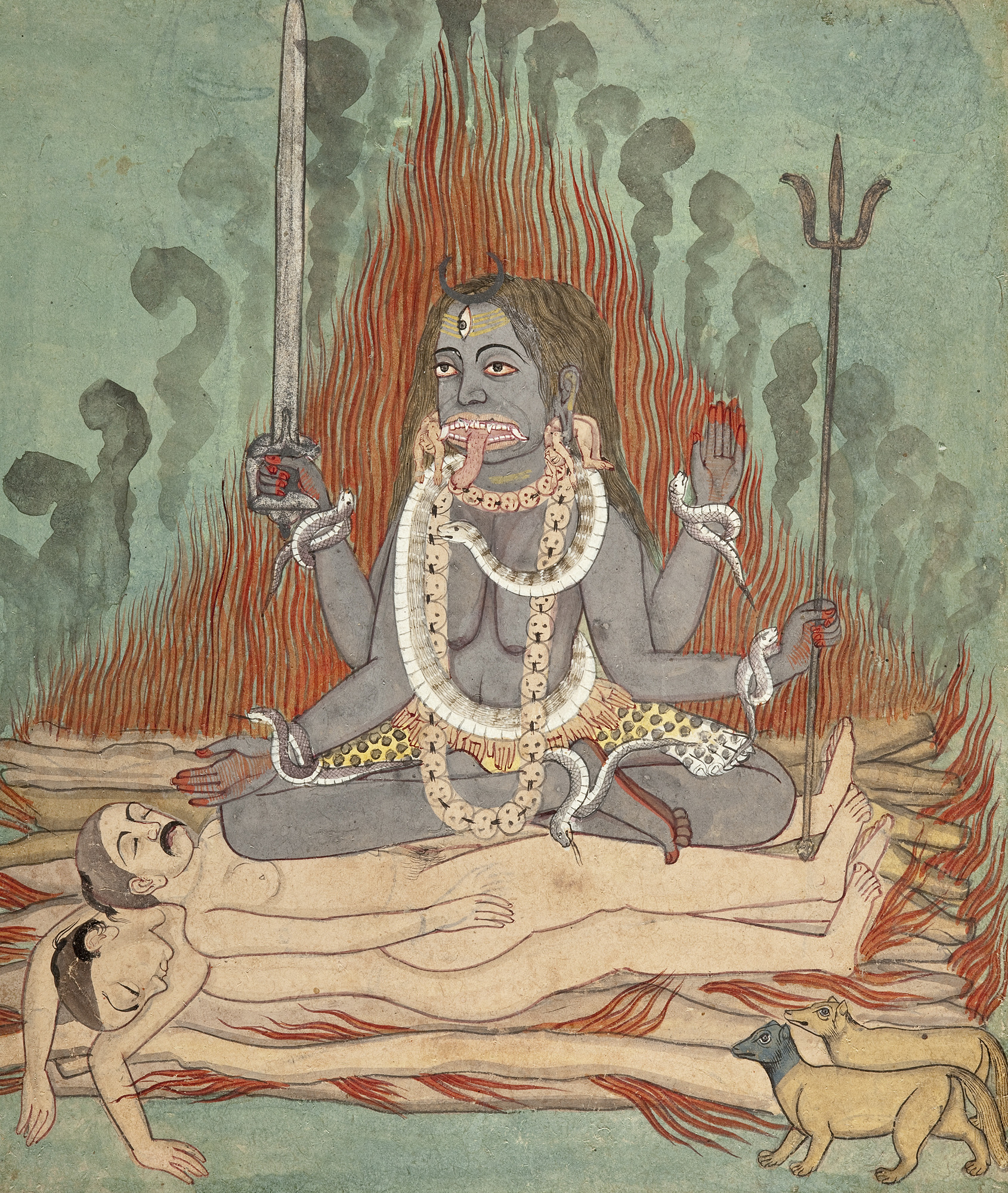
Kali on a cremation pyre

Shmashana Adhipati is a name given to a deity either male or female and also together as a consort, who rules Shmashana, cremation ground. The Shamashana Adhipati literally translates to Lord of Shmashana. The name Shmashan Adhipathi is given to different deities in Hinduism and Tibetan Buddhism.

== In Hinduism ==
Shiva is considered to be the lord of the shmashana, or Shmashana Adhipati. An epithet of Shiva is "inhabitant of the cremation ground" (Sanskrit: śmaśānavāsin, also spelled shmashanavasin), referring to this connection. Kali, his consort, is known by another name, Shmashana Kali. Kali's association with blackness stands in contrast to her consort, Shiva, whose body is covered by the white ashes of the cremation ground in which he meditates, and with which Kali is also associated, as Shmashana Kali is also a protector.

Bhairava, another manifestation of Shiva, and his consort, Bhairavi, are said to live in the shmashana. The Mahavidya goddesses are said to rule over the cremation ground.

In Tantra, the shmashana emerged to be a primary concept of spiritual practices called Shava sadhana. Aghoris and Kapalika are some sects that perform rituals in the shmashana. They invoke Kali, Tara, Yogini, Dakini, Bhairava, Bhairavi, and beings like Vetala, Pishacha, Brahmarakshasha and worship these entities as the shmashana adhipati. They offer them sacrifices in the shmashana with the belief of obtaining occult powers.

== In Tibetan Buddhism ==
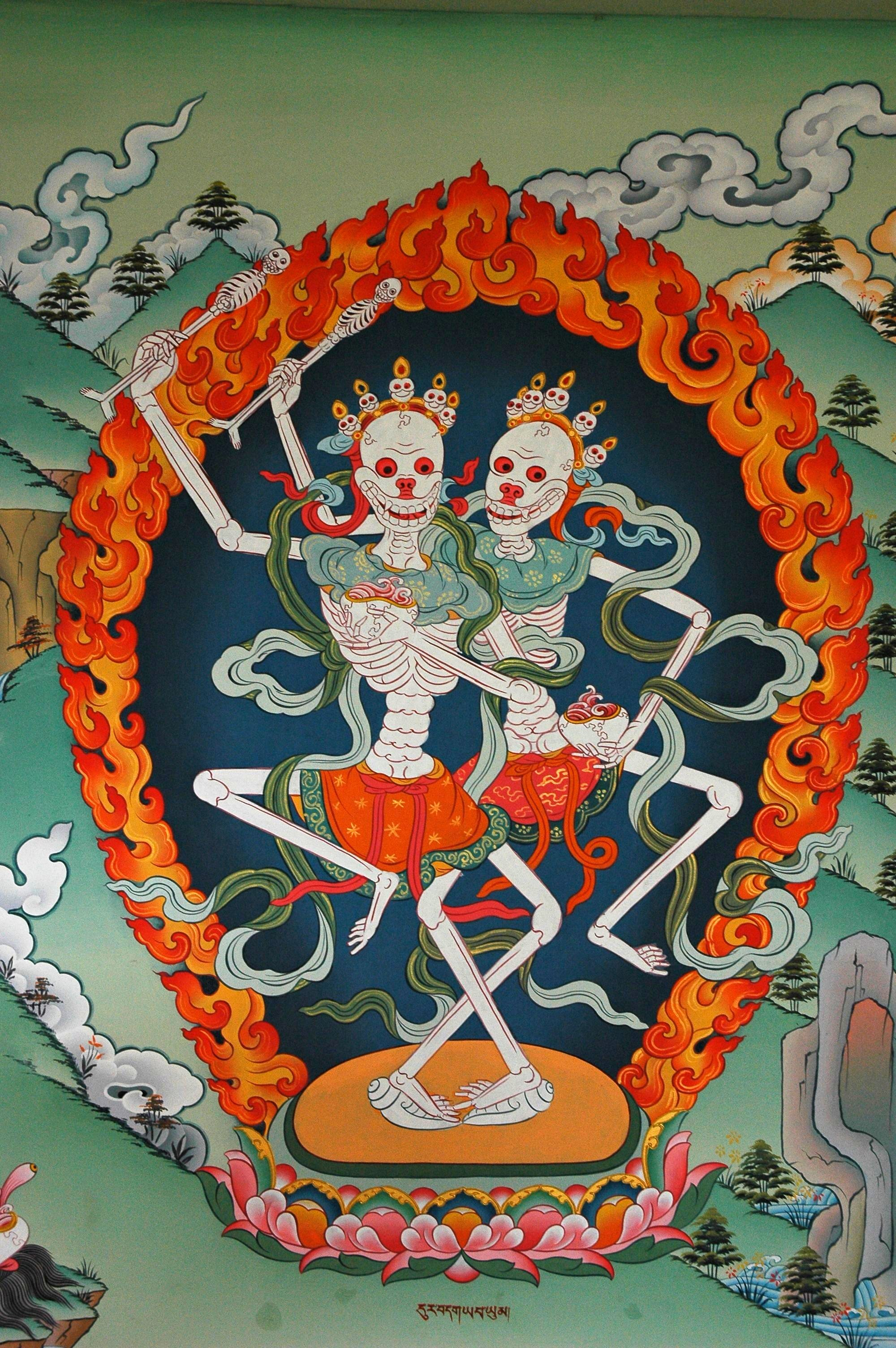
Chitipati as a skeletal deity pair

Further, as per Tibetan Buddhist script a couple known as Shmashana Adhipati (Standard Tibetan: pal dur tro dag po yab yum. English: the Glorious Lords of the Charnel Ground - Father-Mother) also called Chitipati is considered Lord of Shmashana. They arise from the Secret Essence Wheel Tantra and is associated with the collection/cycle of Cakrasaṃvara Tantra. Primarily employed as a wealth practice, with emphasis on protecting from thieves, they also serve as the special protector for the Vajrayogini 'Naro Khechari' practice. Shri Shmashana Adhipati is now common, to a greater or lesser extent, in all the New (Sarma) Schools of Himalayan and Tibetan influenced Buddhism. It is important not to confuse the protector deities Shri Shmashana Adhipati, Father & Mother, with the skeleton dancers found in the various systems of Tibetan religious Cham dance. The word Chitipati again has its origin from word Chita (funeral pyre as per Hindu rites).

Dakini, Shakini and some other tantric deities, associated both with Hinduism and Tibetan Buddhism, are said to roam in Shmashana.
