= Dakota Wint =

American documentary filmmaker

- Born: Detroit, Michigan
- Occupation(s): Filmmaker, world-traveller, podcast host
- Website: dakotawint.com

Dakota Wint is an American documentary filmmaker, vlogger, podcast host, and spiritual teacher from Detroit, Michigan. His films and podcasts revolve around current events, unconventional spirituality, and bizarre traditions. His YouTube channel, Dakota of Earth, has been viewed over 40 million times as of August 2021.

In June 2021 he released a documentary, Aghori: Holy Men of The Dead, about a group of Hindus from India, called the Aghori, who do post mortem rituals as a pathway to enlightenment. His podcast, A Place for Humans, is consistently charting on Apple Podcast top 100 for spirituality category.
