= Shivnetra =

The Shivnetras are an almost extinct community which originated from Varanasi in Northern India. Similar to the Kshatriyas but somewhat more controversial in social context, the Shivnetras are almost extinct today due to the widespread relocation and displacement of the community.

The word "Shivnetra" translates into "Lord Shiva's third eye", and the first Shivnetra is born out of Shiva's third eye as a Swayambhu (or self manifested) which largely points out to be the Hindu deity Kartikeya or Kal Bhairav as the first Shivnetra. Temples which have been closely linked with this community had either Kartikeyya or Kal Bhairav as a sub-deity with Shiva as the main deity. The netras were believed to have been heavily guarded by Aghoris of both Ujjain and Varanasi almost akin to a secret society, until the great migration to South India commenced.

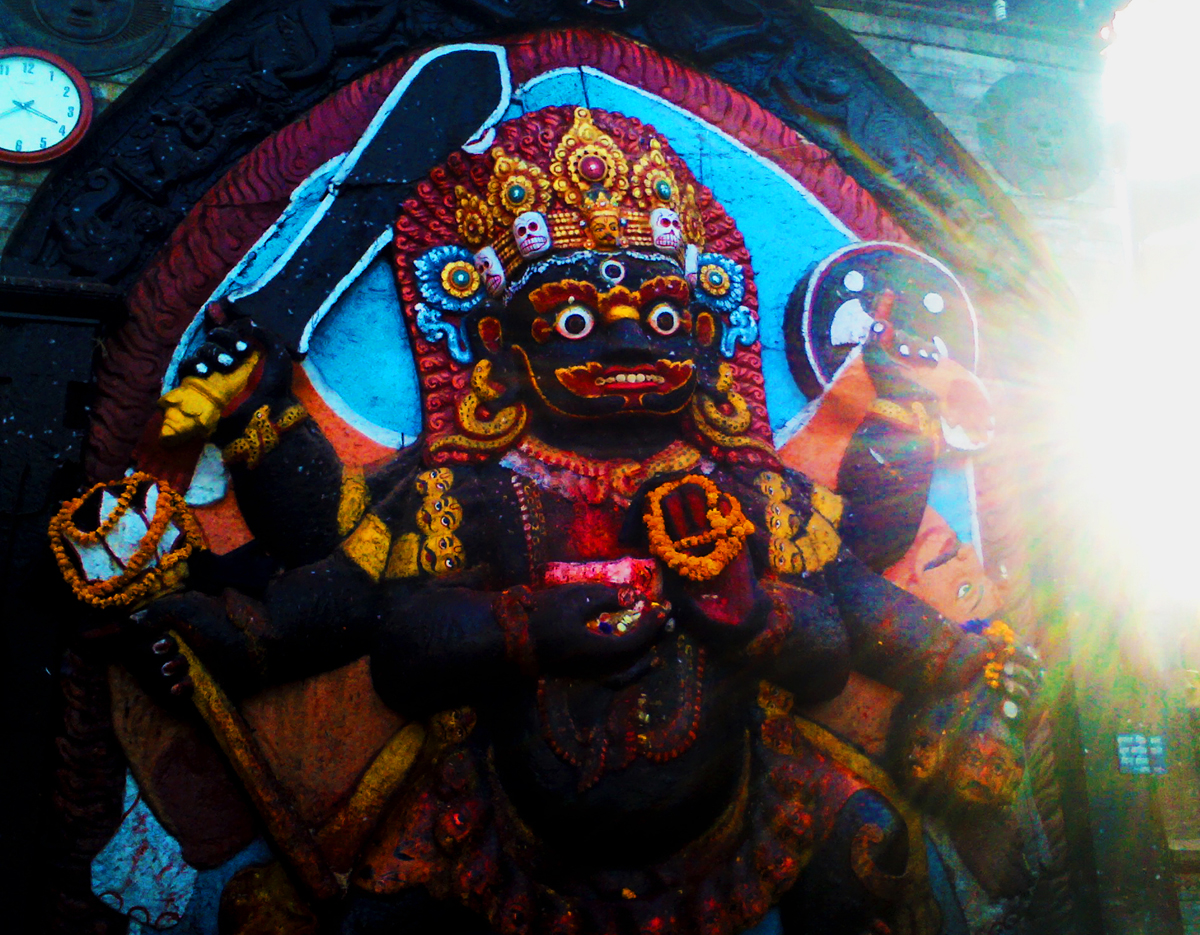
Kala Bhairav, the First Shivnetra

== Shivnetra mythology ==
An inscription in Varanasi gives some account:

They were tall and had shoulders like a lion but they seldom ate, engaged in long silence and meditation they seldom spoke, living on the banks of Ganges and took her as their mother, respected even by the greatest of rulers, feared by the most violent of fighters.They never saw Mangal (Planet Mars), but knew it was Red, they were the sons of Rudra, and lived to serve him.

== Southern sojourn ==
The Shivnetra migration, which started from Varanasi, went through Ujjain, where it is said to have passed Rameshwaram (a temple dedicated to Ujjain Kali is found here, besides that of Shiva), and ended in Trichirapalli and Tanjore. The Shivnetras were sipped into royal appointments by the Chola Empire and formed an integral part of King Raja Raja Chola's court as ministers of defence, treasury and spirituality.

== Contribution to society ==
A Shivnetra is never allowed to accept any form of offering (money, valuable articles) known as dakshina from anyone for conducting puja, instead recommends multiple non-religious work in its community to have resources in the form of food or money.

Shivnetras contribution to astronomy, astrology and mathematics were impeccable, and championed their own ephemerids and equinoxes based on the Vaakya calculation method, mentioned in Puranas, to be guided by the Indian sage Agastya.

== Shivnetra evolution ==
Shivnetras today are only identified with their surname whilst some Shaiva have been completely dissolved into other castes making them completely extinct. Shivnetras re-established their roots in Varanasi over the past century.

The Panchaloga bangle (a semi open bangle made out of gold, silver, copper, lead and iron) found on a Shivnetra male's left hand is forever associated with them, and a Shivnetra is usually associated by it throughout India.
