= Skull Bearers =

Skull Bearers may refer to:

- Skull Bearers, in the Shannara fantasy universe
- Kapalika, a Tantric, non-Puranic form of Shaivism
