= Charnel ground =

Above-ground location for disposal of the dead

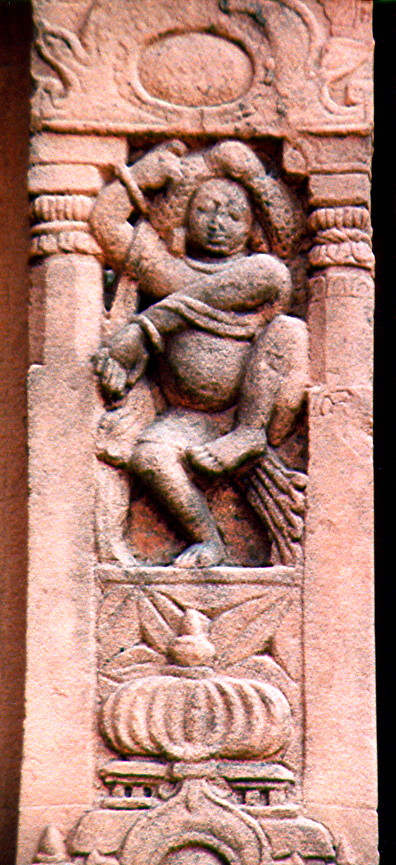
A dancing gana, Dashavatara temple, Deogarh

A charnel ground (Sanskrit: श्मशान; IAST: śmaśāna; Tibetan pronunciation: durtrö; Tibetan: དུར་ཁྲོད, Wylie: dur khrod) is an above-ground site for the putrefaction of bodies, generally human, where formerly living tissue is left to decompose uncovered. Although it may have demarcated locations within it functionally identified as burial grounds, cemeteries and crematoria, it is distinct from these as well as from crypts or burial vaults.

In a religious sense, it is also a very important location for sadhana and ritual activity for Indo-Tibetan traditions of Dharma, particularly those traditions iterated by the Tantric view such as Kashmiri Shaivism, Kaula tradition, Esoteric Buddhism, Vajrayana, Mantrayana, Dzogchen, and the sadhana of Chöd, Phowa and Zhitro, etc. The charnel ground is also an archetypal liminality that figures prominently in the literature and liturgy and as an artistic motif in Dharmic Traditions and cultures iterated by the more antinomian and esoteric aspects of traditional Indian culture.

== Ancient and Medieval India ==
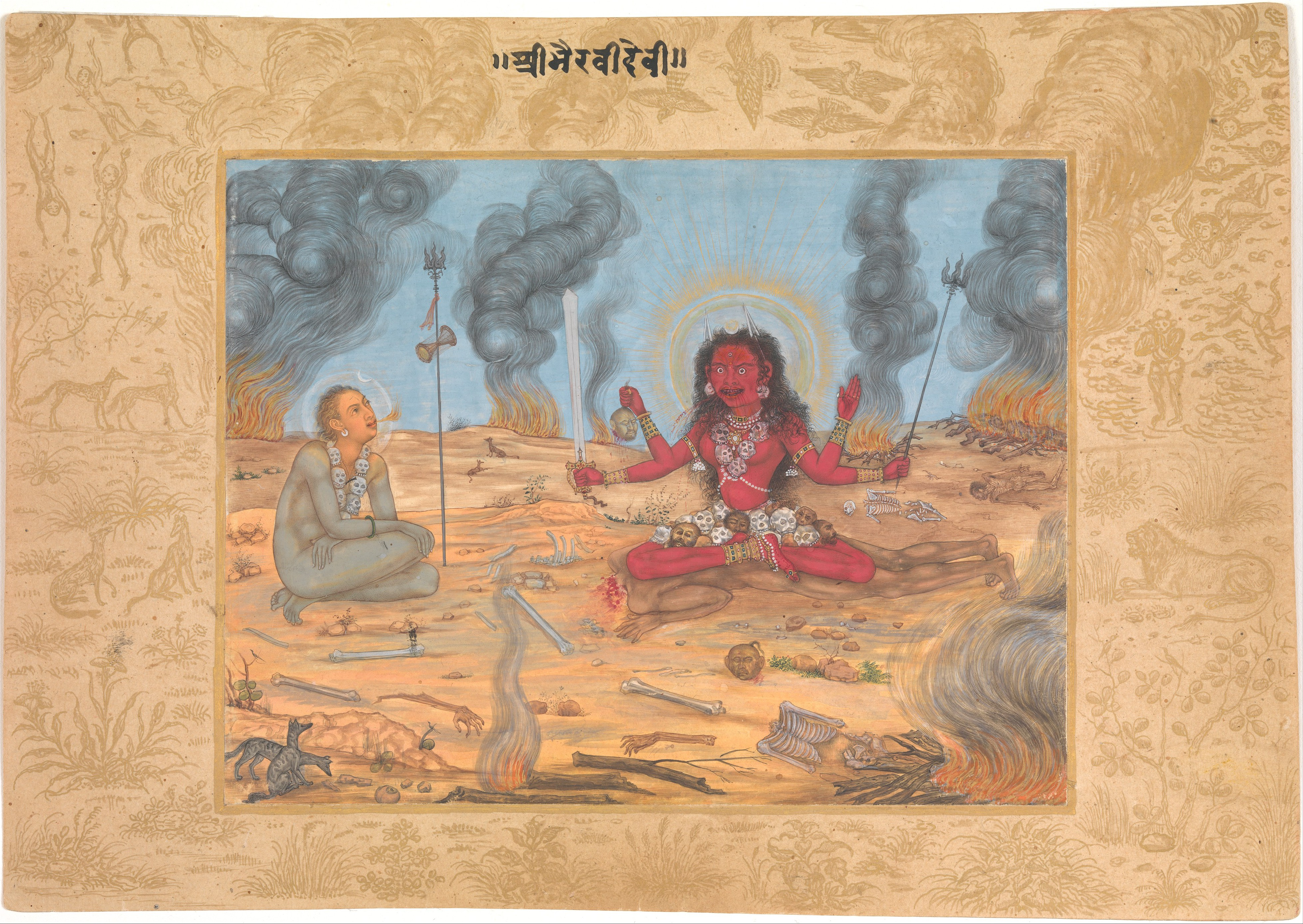
Tantric goddess Bhairavi and her consort Shiva depicted as Kāpālika ascetics, sitting in a charnel ground. Painting by Payāg from a 17th-century manuscript (c. 1630–1635), Metropolitan Museum of Art, New York City.

Throughout Ancient and Medieval India, charnel grounds in the form of open air crematoria were historically often located along rivers and many ancient famous charnel sites are now "sanitized" pilgrimage sites (Sanskrit: tirtha) and areas of significant domestic income through cultural tourism. However, proper "charnel grounds" can still be found in India, especially near large river banks and areas where abandoned people (without family) are cremated or simply left to decompose. These areas are often frequented by the Aghorī, a Hindu monastic order derived from the Kāpālika sect, that follows similar meditation techniques, as those taught by the 84 Mahasiddhas. A typical Aghorī sādhanā at the charnel ground lasts for 12 years.

== Himalayan 'sky burial' ==
In the Himalaya where tillable topsoil for burial and fuel for cremation is scarce and a valuable commodity, the location of a so-called sky burial is identified with a charnel ground.

== Sutrayana and Early Buddhism ==
In the Pali Canon discourses, Gautama Buddha frequently instructs his disciples to seek out a secluded dwelling (in a forest, under the shade of a tree, mountain, glen, hillside cave, charnel ground, jungle grove, in the open, or on a heap of straw). The Vinaya and Sutrayana tradition of the "Nine Cemetery Contemplations" (Pali: nava sīvathikā-manasikāra) described in the Satipatthana Sutta demonstrate that charnel ground and cemetery meditations were part of the ascetic practices in Early Buddhism.

'Cemetery contemplations', as described in Mahasatipatthana Sutta (DN: 22) and the Satipaṭṭhāna Sutta (MN: 10):

...have as their objects a corpse one or two or three days old, swollen up, blue-black in colour, full of corruption; a corpse eaten by crows, etc.; a framework of bones; flesh hanging from it, bespattered with blood, held together by the sinews; without flesh and blood, but still held together by the sinews; bones scattered in all direction; bleached and resembling shells; heaped together after the lapse of years; weathered and crumbled to dust.

At the end of each of these contemplations there follows the conclusion: "This body of mine also has this nature, has this destiny, cannot escape it."

Similar are the 10 objects of loathsomeness (asubha q.v.).

—

== Polysemy and metaphor ==
On a superficial level, the charnel ground is simply a locality, often chthonic, where bodies are disposed of, either by cremation or burial. Though the charnel ground can be understood as a polysemy and metaphor, these sites were historically also frequented by holy people in India, China, Tibet and other areas as part of their sadhana and natural spiritual evolution grappling with death, impermanence and transition. Charnel grounds, crematoriums and cemeteries were often feared and despised by people who did not understand their 'proclivities' (Sanskrit: anusaya).

From a deeper structural significance and getting to the substantive bones of the Vajrayana spiritual point of view however, the charnel ground is full of profound transpersonal significance. It represents the 'death of ego' (Sanskrit: atmayajna), and the end of:

- **attachment** (Sanskrit: Upādāna; Tibetan: len pa) to this body and life
- **craving** (Sanskrit: Tṛṣṇā; Tibetan: sred pa) for a body and life in the future
- **fear of death** (Sanskrit: abhiniveśa)
- **aversion** (Sanskrit: dveṣa; Wylie: zhe sdang) to the decay of 'impermanence' (Sanskrit: anitya).

It is worth noting that 'attachment', 'craving', 'fear' and 'aversion' above cited in bold font are somewhat standardized and hence less-rich lexical choices for the semantic field represented by the four of the 'Five Poisons' (Sanskrit: pancha klesha) they denote.

Prior to spiritual realization, charnel grounds are to be understood as terrifying places, full of 'roaming spirits' (Sanskrit: gana) and 'hungry ghosts' (Sanskrit: pretas) indeed localities that incite consuming fear. In a charnel ground there are bodies everywhere in different states of decomposition: freshly dead bodies, decaying bodies, skeletons and disembodied bones.

Simmer-Brown (2001: p. 127) conveys how the 'charnel ground' experience may present itself in the modern Western mindstream situations of emotional intensity, protracted peak performance, marginalization and extreme desperation:

In contemporary Western society, the charnel ground might be a prison, a homeless shelter, the welfare roll, or a factory assembly line. The key to its successful support of practice is its desperate, hopeless, or terrifying quality. For that matter, there are environments that appear prosperous and privileged to others but are charnel grounds for their inhabitants – Hollywood, Madison Avenue, Wall Street, Washington, D.C. These are worlds in which extreme competitiveness, speed, and power rule, and the actors in their dramas experience intense emotion, ambition, and fear. The intensity of their dynamics makes all of these situations ripe for the Vajrayana practice of the charnel ground.

—

== Denizens and pastimes of the charnel ground ==
- Shiva as Bhairava
- 'Outcastes' (Sanskrit: Chandala) literally cast out from the castes, outside the Varnashrama Dharma of the status quo.

=== Dancing ===
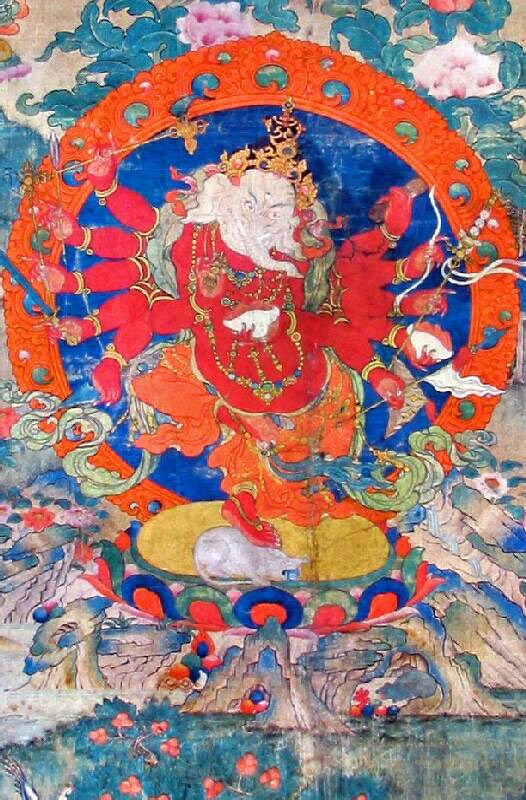
Ganapati, Maha Rakta

Tibetan representations of Ganesha show ambivalent or richly different depictions of him. In one Tibetan form he is shown being trodden under foot by Mahākala, a popular Tibetan deity. Other depictions show him as the Destroyer of Obstacles, sometimes dancing. This play of Ganesha as both the "creator and remover of obstacles" as per his epithet as well in the two Vajrayana iconographic depictions of him as that which consumes (Maha Rakta) and that which is consumed (danced upon by Vignantaka) is key to the reciprocity rites of the charnel ground.

Ganapati, Maha Rakta (Tibetan: tsog gi dag po, mar chen. English: The Great Red Lord of Hosts or Ganas) is a Tantric Buddhist form of Ganapati (Ganesha) related to the Chakrasamvara Cycle of Tantras. The Sanskrit term 'rakta' holds the semantic field of "blood" and "red". This form of Ganapati is regarded as an emanation of Avalokiteshvara.

"...beside a lapis lazuli rock mountain is a red lotus with eight petals, in the middle a blue rat expelling various jewels, [mounted on his rat 'steed' (Sanskrit: vahana)] Shri Ganapati with a body red in colour, having an elephant face with sharp white tusks and possessing three eyes, black hair tied in a topknot with a wishing-gem and a red silk ribbon [all] in a bundle on the crown of the head. With twelve hands, the six right hold an axe, arrow, hook, vajra, sword and spear. The six left [hold] a pestle, bow, khatvanga, skullcup filled with blood, skullcup filled with human flesh and a shield together with a spear and banner. The peaceful right and left hands are signified by the vajra and skullcup filled with blood held to the heart. The remaining hands are displayed in a threatening manner. Wearing various silks as a lower garment and adorned with a variety of jewel ornaments, the left foot is extended in a dancing manner, standing in the middle of the bright rays of red flickering light." (Ngorchen Konchog Lhundrup, 1497–1557).

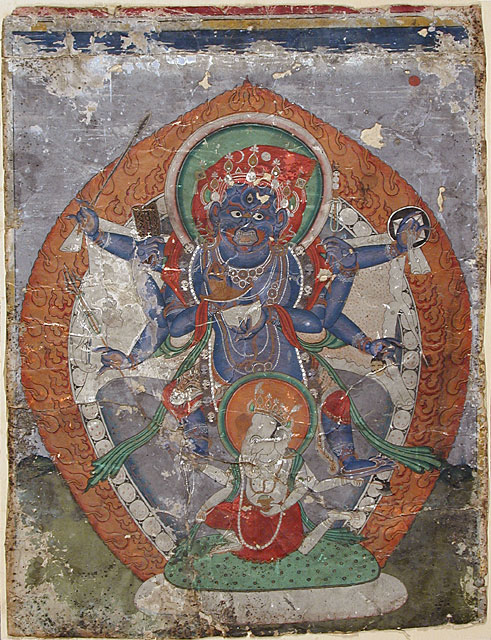
Vignantaka trampling or dancing upon Vinayaka

This form of Ganapati belongs to a set of three powerful deities known as the 'mar chen kor sum' or the Three Great Red Deities included in a larger set called 'The Thirteen Golden Dharmas' of Sakya. The other two deities are Kurukulle and Takkiraja.

In depictions of the six-armed protector Mahakala (Skt: Shad-bhuja Mahakala, Wylie: mGon po phyag drug pa), an elephant-headed figure usually addressed as Vinayaka is seen being trampled by the Dharma Protector, but he does not appear distressed. In Vajrayana and cognate Buddhist art, He is depicted as a subdued god trampled by Buddhist deities like Aparajita, Parnasabari and Vignataka.

The Tibetan Ganesha appears, besides bronzes, in the resplendent Thangka paintings alongside the Buddha. In "Ganesh, studies of an Asian God," edited by Robert L. BROWN, State University of New York Press, 1992, pp. 241–242, he wrote that in the Tibetan Ka'gyur tradition, it is said that the Buddha had taught the "Ganapati Hridaya Mantra" (or "Aryaganapatimantra") to disciple Ananda.

The 'pastime' and 'play' (Sanskrit: lila) of dancing and its representation in charnel ground literature and visual representations is endemic: Ganapati as son of Shiva, Ganapati as Lord of Gana, the demonic host of Gana, dancing ganesha, dancing gana, the dance of life and death, what is dance but a continuum of forms, dancing is energetic, dancing is symbolic of spiritual energy in iconography, particularly chthonic imagery of Dharmic Traditions. Energy moves (and cycles) between forms as does dance. The 'wheel' (Sanskrit: chakra, mandala) in all its permutations and efflorescence is a profound Dharmic cultural artifact enshrining the energetic dance of the Universe. This is particularly applicable in the iconography of Nataraja and the 'wrathful deities' (Sanskrit: Heruka) of Vajrayana which are depicted with a flaming aureole, a flaming wheel. This resonates with the deep symbolism of the mystery rite and folklore and folk custom and high culture of circle dances which approaches a human cultural universal. Namkhai Norbu, a famed Dzogchen master in the Bonpo tradition and the Dharmic Traditions of esoteric Buddhism has revealed a number of terma (Tibetan) of circle dances such as the 'Dance of the Six Lokas of Samantabhadra'. The dance is a restricted initiatory rite and its process may not be disclosed as so doing would be a contravention of 'commitments ' (Sanskrit: samaya) but it may be affirmed that the rite is enacted on a colourful mandala of the Five Pure Lights and the 'central point' (Sanskrit: bindu) of the dance mandala is illuminated with a sacred candle known as the 'garbha' (Sanskrit) within the International Dzogchen Community. This terma dance is all clearly applicable to the charnel ground when taken as the 'wheel of becoming' (Sanskrit: bhavachakra) which generally is demarcated by six distinct 'places' (Sanskrit: loka).

=== Aghora ===
Dattatreya the avadhuta, to whom has been attributed the esteemed nondual medieval song, the Avadhuta Gita, was a sometime denizen of the charnel ground and a founding deity of the Aghor tradition according to Barrett (2008: p. 33):

...Lord Dattatreya, an antinomian form of Shiva closely associated with the cremation ground, who appeared to Baba Kina Ram atop Girnar Mountain in Gujarat. Considered to be the adi guru (ancient spiritual teacher) and founding deity of Aghor, Lord Dattatreya offered his own flesh to the young ascetic as prasād (a kind of blessing), conferring upon him the power of clairvoyance and establishing a guru-disciple relationship between them.

—

Barrett (2008: p. 161) discusses the sadhana of the 'Aghora' (Sanskrit; Devanagari: अघोर) in both its left and right-handed proclivites and identifies it as principally cutting through attachments and aversion and foregrounding primordiality, a view uncultured, undomesticated:

The gurus and disciples of Aghor believe their state to be primordial and universal. They believe that all human beings are natural-born Aghori. Hari Baba has said on several occasions that human babies of all societies are without discrimination, that they will play as much in their own filth as with the toys around them. Children become progressively discriminating as they grow older and learn the culturally specific attachments and aversions of their parents. Children become increasingly aware of their mortality as they bump their heads and fall to the ground. They come to fear their mortality and then palliate this fear by finding ways to deny it altogether. In this sense, Aghor sādhanā is a process of unlearning deeply internalized cultural models. When this sādhanā takes the form of shmashān sādhanā, the Aghori faces death as a very young child, simultaneously meditating on the totality of life at its two extremes. This ideal example serves as a prototype for other Aghor practices, both left and right, in ritual and in daily life.

—

- Vetala (Sanskrit)
- Shaivites
- Practitioners of Anuyoga. The Anuyoga class of tantras of the Nyingmapa is understood as the "Mother Tantras" of the Sarma Schools, this class of literature is also known as "Yogini Tantras" and there is a voluminous Shaivite or Shakta Tantra by the same name, Yoginitantra.
- In the dance of reciprocity that is the beauty and cruelty of the Mystery of living and dying, the rite of Ganachakra is celebrated, indeed all forms participate in the Ganachakra, there is nothing in the Three Worlds (Triloka) that is not a charnel ground...

Beer (2003: p. 102) relates how the symbolism of the khatvanga that entered esoteric Buddhism (particularly from Padmasambhava) was a direct borrowing from the Shaivite Kapalikas who frequented places of austerity such as charnel grounds and cross roads etcetera as a form of 'left-handed path' (Sanskrit: vamamarga) 'spiritual practice' (Sanskrit: sadhana):

The form of the Buddhist khatvanga derived from the emblematic staff of the early Indian Shaivite yogins, known as kapalikas or 'skull-bearers'. The kapalikas were originally miscreants who had been sentenced to a twelve-year term of penance for the crime of inadvertently killing a Brahmin. The penitent was prescribed to dwell in a forest hut, at a desolate crossroads, in a charnel ground, or under a tree; to live by begging; to practice austerities; and to wear a loin-cloth of hemp, dog, or donkey-skin. They also had to carry the emblems of a human skull as an alms-bowl, and the skull of the Brahmin they had slain mounted upon a wooden staff as a banner. These Hindu kapalika ascetics soon evolved into an extreme outcaste sect of the 'left-hand' tantric path (Skt. vamamarg) of shakti or goddess worship. The early Buddhist tantric yogins and yoginis adopted the same goddess or dakini attributes of the kapalikas. These attributes consisted of; bone ornaments, an animal skin loincloth, marks of human ash, a skull-cup, damaru, flaying knife, thighbone trumpet, and the skull-topped tantric staff or khatvanga.

—

== Sadhana ==
Sadhana in the charnel ground within the Dharmic Traditions may be traced to ancient depictions of the chthonic Shiva and his chimeric son Ganapati (Ganesha) who was decapitated and returned to life with the head of an elephant. In certain narratives, Shiva made the Ganesha 'lord of the gana' (Sanskrit: Ganapati). Such depictions of Shiva, Ganesha and the ganas are evident in literature, architectural ornamentation and iconography, etc. In the Indian traditions of Tantra the charnel ground is very important. It must be remembered that the seat of Shiva and his locality of sadhana is the sacred Mount Kailasha in the Himalaya. In some non-Buddhist traditions of Ganachakra such as the Kaula the leader of the rite is known as 'ganapati', which is a title of respect. The Eight Great Charnel Grounds are important in the life of Padmasambhava. This is one definite way the importance of the charnel ground in sadhana entered and became replicated in the Himalayan Dharmic Tradition. The charnel ground is a particular place that holds powerful teachings on impermanence and is important for slaying the ego. In this, the charnel ground shares with the tradition of dark retreat that was foregrounded in some Himalayan practice lineages.

Simmer-Brown (2001: p. 127) conveys how great Mahasiddhas in the Nath and Mantrayana Buddhadharma traditions such as Tilopa (988–1069) and Gorakṣa (fl. 11th–12th century) yoked adversity to till the soil of the path and accomplish the fruit, the 'ground' (Sanskrit: āśraya; Wylie: gzhi) of realization – worthy case-studies for those with spiritual proclivity:

The charnel ground is not merely the hermitage; it can also be discovered or revealed in completely terrifying mundane environments where practitioners find themselves desperate and depressed, where conventional worldly aspirations have become devastated by grim reality. This is demonstrated in the sacred biographies of the great siddhas of the Vajrayāna tradition. Tilopa attained realization as a grinder of sesame seeds and a procurer for a prominent prostitute. Sarvabhakṣa was an extremely obese glutton, Gorakṣa was a cowherd in remote climes, Taṅtepa was addicted to gambling, and Kumbharipa was a destitute potter. These circumstances were charnel grounds because they were despised in Indian society and the siddhas were viewed as failures, marginal and defiled.

—

== Poetry, song, and literature ==
Dyczkowski (1988: p. 26) holds Hāla's Prakrit literature poem the Gāthāsaptaśati (third to fifth century CE) to be one of the first extant literary references to a Kapalika where in the poem the Kapalika, who is a female, anoints and besmears her body with the crematory ash from the funeral pyre of her recently deceased lover. This is a literary allusion to the anointing of 'sacred ash' (Sanskrit: bhasma; vibhuti) especially associated with Shiva who applies it all over his body.

Dyczkowski (1988: p. 26) relates how Kṛṣṇa Miśra (c. 1050–1100) casts the character of a Kāpālika in his play, the Prabodhacandrodaya and then quotes verbatim a source that renders the creed of this character into English:

"My charming ornaments are made from garlands of human skulls." says the Kāpālika, "I dwell in the cremation ground and eat my food from a human skull. I view the world alternately as separate from God (Īśvara) and one with Him, through the eyes that are made clear with the ointment of yoga... We (Kāpālikas) offer oblations of human flesh mixed with brains, entrails and marrow. We break our fast by drinking liquor (surā) from the skull of a Brahmin. At that time the god Mahābhairava should be worshipped with offerings of awe-inspiring human sacrifices from whose severed throats blood flows in currents."

In Vajrayana poetry, literature and song, particularly that of the 'songs of realization', charnel grounds are often described as containing "rivers of blood", "poisonous waterfalls", and depicted as localities containing dangerous wild beasts. The two truths doctrine though iterates this view and when perceived differently, charnel grounds are peaceful places of beatific solitude and this chthonic symbolism and the twilight language and iconography accrues a rich polysemy. When perceived differently, the charnel grounds are places of 'peace' (Sanskrit: shanti), pleasant groves, populated by wildflowers and fruit. Songbirds, tame lions and tigers, and the vast open vault of the sky, fruit and flowers are often used in Vajrayana iconography and poetry and Beer (1999) explains their symbolism and how they are understood in the tradition in fine detail. They are all included in depictions of the charnel ground.

The Upa-yoga scriptures first appeared in 'Mount Jakang Chen' Tibetan: རི་བྱ་རྐང་ཅན, Wylie: ri bya rkang can (alternate names: Riwo Jakang, Mount Jizu) and the charnel ground of Cool Grove Tibetan: བསིལ་བའི་ཚལ, Wylie: bsil ba'i tshal. Cool Grove is also known as 'Śītavana' (Sanskrit).

Gray (undated: c. 2009) provides an excellent survey of chthonic charnel ground accoutrement motif such as skull imagery in the textual tradition of the Yogini tantras.

=== Baital Pachisi ===
- Baital Pachisi
- Somadeva

== Beyond social convention ==
In the charnel grounds of Vajrayana, there are no social conventions to conform to and no distractions to be seduced by for the siddha. Dakas and dakinis gather there to celebrate ceremonial tsok 'feasts' (Sanskrit: ganachakra). The lion's roar of Dharma discourse resound as do the liturgy and the specific 'hourglass drums' (Sanskrit: damaru) of the chödpa and the light of the inner 'joy of bliss' (Sanskrit: ananda) radiates and this dynamic movement is represented iconographically by the 'bliss-whirling' (Sanskrit: ananda-chakra).

In his Manual on the practice of the Longchen Nyingtik, Dzongsar Khyentse Rinpoche holds that:

"Right now, our minds are very fickle. Sometimes you like a certain place, and it inspires, and yet with that same place, if you stay too long, it bores you. […] As you practice more and more, one day this kind of habit, this fickle mind will just go. Then you will search for the bindu interpretation of the right place, and according to the classic tantric texts, that is usually what they call the “eight great charnel grounds”. So then, you have to go to a cemetery, especially to one of the eight cemeteries. There, under a tree, in the charnel ground, wearing a tiger skin skirt, holding a kapāla and having this indifference between relatives and enemies, indifference between food and shit, you will practise. Then your bindu will flow. At that time, you will know how to have intercourse between emptiness and appearance."

In the life in which a pratyekabuddha attains the fruit of their 'path' (Wylie: lam), they are naturally drawn to charnel grounds. "When reflecting on the bones found there, the pratyekabuddha inquire "Where do these bones come from?" This samyama (Sanskrit) on the bones awakens knowledge of their many lifetimes of investigation into the 'Twelve Links of Dependent Origination'. These twelve links then unfold in their mindstream as a 'blessing' (Sanskrit: adhishthana), in both forward and reverse sequence and on that foundation they yield 'realisation' (Sanskrit: siddhi).

== Vajrayana iconography ==
The charnel ground, cremation ground and cemetery is evident as a specific region within wrathful Indo-Tibetan sand mandala iconography. As the anthropologist Gold (1994: p. 141) relates in his comparative study drawn from his professional fieldwork into the symbolic universals of the sacred circles and sand-paintings of the Navajo and Tibetan peoples, parses the sacred precinct and motif of the charnel ground as a locality in the symbolic grammar of the Indo-Tibetan 'fierce yidam' or 'wrathful deity' (Sanskrit: heruka) sand mandala:

The third concentric ring [from the circumference] is optional, in that it is only used in mandalas representing the reality of deities of fierce power. It represents the charnel grounds wherein bodies are cut up and offered to birds of prey as a "sky burial." This ring signifies the cutting away of the bones and flesh of illusion on the way to the primordial ground at the mandala's center. In some mandalas, it is positioned outside of the Mountain of Fire ring.

—

The region of the charnel grounds in many wrathful mandala often hold eight specific charnel grounds where certain key events take place in the life of Padmasambhava.

The Vajrayana yidam Citipati is said to be the Lord of Charnel Grounds.

Blood is thematic in Charnel Ground iconography where it may be understood as lifeblood, a symbol of viscous 'compassion' (Sanskrit: karuna) of 'sacrifice' (Sanskrit:yajna), and attendant with the symbolism of blood, bones ground our shared humanity and solidarity in the wider Mandala of life and the ancient lineage of 'ancestors' from which all sentient beings are of lineal descent.

The tradition and custom of the 'sky burial' (Tibetan: jhator) afforded Traditional Tibetan medicine and thangka iconography such as the 'Tree of physiology' with a particular insight into the interior workings of the human body. Pieces of the human skeleton were employed in ritual tools such as the skullcup, thigh-bone trumpet, etc.

The 'symbolic bone ornaments' (Skt: aṣṭhiamudrā; Tib: rus pa'i rgyan phyag rgya) are also known as "mudra" or 'seals' are also known as 'charnel ground ornaments'. The Hevajra Tantra identifies the Symbolic Bone Ornaments with the Five Wisdoms and Jamgon Kongtrul in his commentary to the Hevajra Tantra explains this further.

The important Varnamala (or 'garland of bija phonemes' in twilight language is iconographically represented by a 'garland of severed heads or skulls' (Sanskrit: Mundamala).

== Padmasambhava ==
Beer (1999: pp. 277–278) relates how Padmasambhava received the siddhi of the kīla transmission from a gigantic scorpion at the charnel ground of Rajgriha:

The sting of the scorpion's whip-like tail transfixes and poisons its prey, and in this respect it is identified with the wrathful activity of the ritual dagger or kīla. Padmasambhava's biography relates how he received the siddhi of the kīla transmission at the great charnel ground of Rajgriha from a gigantic scorpion with nine heads, eighteen pincers and twenty-seven eyes. This scorpion reveals the kīla texts from a triangular stone box hidden beneath a rock in the cemetery. As Padmasambhava reads this terma text spontaneous understanding arises, and the heads, pincers, and eyes of the scorpion are 'revealed' as different vehicles or yanas of spiritual attainment. Here, at Rajgriha, Padmasambhava is given the title of 'the scorpion guru', and in one of his eight forms as Guru Dragpo or Pema Drago ('wrathful lotus'), he is depicted with a scorpion in his left hand. As an emblem of the wrathful kīla transmission the image of the scorpion took on a strong symbolic meaning in the early development of the Nyingma or 'ancient school' of Tibetan Buddhism...".

—

== Eight great charnel grounds ==
The 'Eight Great Charnel Grounds (Sanskrit: aṣṭamahāśmāśāna; Tibetan: དུར་ཁྲོད་ཆེན་པོ་བརྒྱད, Wylie: dur khrod chen po brgyad)

- The Most Fierce (Tibetan: གཏུམ་དྲག, Wylie: gtum drag)
- Dense Thicket (Tibetan: ཚང་ཚིང་འཁྲིགས་པ, Wylie: tshang tshing 'khrigs pa)
- Dense Blaze (Tibetan: འབར་འཁྲིགས་པ, Wylie: 'bar 'khrigs pa)
- Endowed with Skeletons (Tibetan: ཀེང་རུས་ཅན, Wylie: keng rus can)
- Cool Forest or Cool Grove (Sanskrit: Śītavana; Devanagari: शीतवन; Tibetan: བསིལ་བུ་ཚལ, Wylie: bsil bu tshal)
- Black Darkness (Tibetan: མུན་པ་ནག་པོ, Wylie: mun pa nag po)
- Resonant with "Kilikili" (Tibetan: ཀི་ལི་ཀི་ལིར་སྒྲ་སྒྲོག་པ, Wylie: ki li ki lir sgra sgrog pa)
- Wild Cries of "Ha-ha" (Tibetan: ཧ་ཧ་རྒོད་པ, Wylie: ha ha rgod pa)

=== Charnel ground relics ===
Dudjom et al. (1991: p. 626 History) relates how "earth, stone, water, and wood" gathered from The Eight Great Charnel Grounds and auspicious objects such as the flesh of a seven-times-born Brahmana and 'relics' (Sanskrit: Śarīra) of the Tathagatha amongst other items were used to sculpt a statue of 'Yangdak Heruka' (Wylie: yang dag heruka; Sanskrit: Viśuddhaheruka) modelled on Zurcungpa (1014–1074 CE; alt. Zurcung Sherap-tra) holding the aspect of the yidam after a vase empowerment was given to the sculptors by the "master" (Zurcungpa):

The sculptors displayed great devotion, so first of all the master gave them the vase empowerment of the glorious Yangdak Heruka. They prepared a mixture which combined relics from the Tathagata's remains; the flesh of one who had been born as a brahman seven times; earth, stone, water, and wood from the eight charnel grounds; a variety of precious gems; and sacramental medicine refined by the awareness-holders of India and Tibet.

—

== See also ==
- Shiva
- Digambara
- Longchen Nyingtik

== Bibliography ==
- Nagar, Shanti Lal. The Cult of Vinayaka. (Intellectual Publishing House: New Delhi, 1992). ISBN 8170760439. Chapter 17: "The Travels Abroad".
- Kongtrul Lodrö Tayé, Jamgön (2005), Systems of Buddhist Tantra, The Indestructible Way of Secret Mantra, The Treasury of Knowledge, book 6, part 4, Boulder: Snow Lion, ISBN 1-55939-210-X.
- Gold, Peter (1994). Navajo and Tibetan Sacred Wisdom: The Circle of the Spirit (Paperback). Inner Traditions. ISBN 0-89281-411-X, 978-0-89281-411-4, p. 141
- Getty, Alice. Gaņeśa: A Monograph on the Elephant-Faced God. (Clarendon Press: Oxford, 1936). 1992 reprint edition, ISBN 81-215-0377-X. Individual chapters are devoted to individual countries and regions of the world.
- McDermott, Rachel F.; Jeffrey J. Kripal (2003). Encountering Kālī: in the margins, at the center, in the West. University of California Press. ISBN 978-0-520-23239-6.
- Tsuda, Shinichi (1978). 'The cult of śmaśana, the realities of Tantra'. In Goudriaan, Teun (ed.)(1978). The Sanskrit Tradition and Tantrism. Leiden: E.J. Brill, pp. 96–108.
