= Khayerkhal =

Village in West Bengal, India

Khayerkhal is a village situated under the Maynaguri block at "Padamati I Gram Panchayat" in Jalpaiguri District, West Bengal, India. Its length round covers around 4-4.5 km. Its total population is 2471 of which 1315 are male and 1156 female, occupying 560 households. The total families are 282 and BPL families are 237. (all data in 2006*)

== Assets and resources at Khayerkhal ==
Human resources: Professional levels: Medical-doctors, compounders, LMP, Homeopathic doctors: One Homeopathic doctor who has chamber at the Bhotepatti and he has been providing service to the poor people for last 20 years.

Engineering: There is no such technical or engineering person at this area though there are many graduate and master's degree youths.

Agriculture: Most of the householders are involved in the agriculture field. There are 353 families purely based on agriculture though few of them are recently involved in tea plantation.

Quake: One quake doctor at this sansad has reputation to provide the health service and many of the villagers rely on him as a local doctor.

People with special knowledge: Bhupali Roy, from 'Arjunerbari' habitation is an artist in ceramic materials and a group of 'Lokogiti' led by 'Anjali RoyDakua' has district and state level reputation as well as they are involved in various awareness generation programme.

Gender: There are 2473 people living in the Khayerkhal sansad: 1241 male, 1232 female, 1035 youths, 521 boys and 514 girls. Most of the young women including aged are included in Self Help Group (SHG). There are 23 numbers are SHGs formed by Panchayet and around 250 women are involved in bank linkage programme. The 37 males consist of youth and aged farmers taking initiatives for socio-economic development under the farmers club. Its governance is developed as they are jointly participating in planning and implement the activities. The deprived section of the society gets social support from other stakeholders when emergency / critical issues like daughter marriage, serious health problem etc. arises.

Formal and informal groups: The formal like SHGs, Farmers club etc. informal groups like SUS, Artist group etc. evolved as local level institutions that are working towards community development and extending their helping hands to local governance.

Common rules: • The common rule is that the common people will be participating in whatever activities undertaken by formal and informal groups and same time PRI member and GUS will be involved in. • The outcome of any activities will be shared at open platform as well as reporting to the GP Pradhan. • The documentation / book keeping on different activities of SHGs, Fanners club etc. will be maintained by Khayerkhal SUS. • The SUS and GUS have a responsibility to conduct the meeting as well as mobilizing the other stakeholders within the areas.

Collective representation: The GUS and other stakeholders including community are addressing identifying the developmental issues. Some of the issues are solved by themselves and other issues are addressed to the PRI. • The district and block level agriculture department, SUS and GUS are collectively organizing the meeting on different crops to maximize the crop yields. • The people planning developed by the community/SUS and GUS appreciated in the programme of SRD (P& RD Dept.s.). • The enrolment and attendance of the children is increased as well as implementation of schemes is improving by collective representation of SUS and GUS. • 44 numbers of households under Farmers club are directly linkage with bank for socio-economic activities initiated by GUS and SUS.

A number of leaders emerged from the community. Trained leaders from SHGs, GUS, Farmers Club, and SUS participate in planning and implementing activities, as well as developing new initiatives.

Natural Resources:

Land and soil: Most of the land is occupied by agriculture purpose as well as one river is flowing through this sansad. This sansad's land also occupied by larger lowland called "Chakchaka/Magoshani dham". The soil is mixture of clay at tops and sands under the clay. The soil is fertile and permissibility of the soil is medium which is good for agriculture crops.

Cropping pattern and shifts in cropping pattern: The main crops of this area are rice, wheat, potato, jute, cabbage, cauliflower, vegetable etc. The farmers are growing the crops three times in a year. There is not so much change cropping pattern for last 15 years but recently some of the farmers have shifted agricultural field into tea garden as they are not getting enough profit from agriculture as well as 3 years hard work to adopt the tea gives good benefit with less work for next 50 years.

Water and aquatic resources: The drinking water at few habitation of this sansad is better in the sense of PHE tap water but at few habitation villagers are getting drinking water from HTW and open well. The irrigation water is available from the river and low land but farmers are facing problem to irrigate all lands due to lack of sufficient pump sets. Here is one mini RLI who is defunct for last 6 years. There are 31 ponds and few of them are big and containing water for all seasons. These ponds can also be utilized.

Trees and forest products: There are few historical trees and various medicinal plants are available in this 'sansad' as well as no forest though very small forest planted by the individual.

Physical Resources:

Roads and transport: One cobbled road which is considered as main road from north to south is connected with 'Bhotpatty' and 'Padamoti II GP' of Maynaguri town and three mud roads connected with main roads. There is no availability of government transport / bus though private mini bus and tracker used to travel to Maynaguri bye pass / town.

Shelter and buildings: There is on such building or shelter house for emergency flood/natural disaster as well as no such individual residential building though ICDS center, primary schools' building are constructed with bricks and tin sheet. There is one new small building from PHE department to supply the drinking water.

Water supply and sanitation: There is pipeline water supply / 10 taps from PHE department which are covering around 150 households of 534. There are 312 families who are having the sanitation materials from GP but many of them are not using / not installed as it was not in priority list of these households. Around 180 families including private are using the sanitation.

Energy: There is long-term demand of electricity among the community. Only 110 families are enjoying the advantage of energy / electricity. There is no solar energy / light and many of them are using the battery to run the television.

Tools and equipment for production: The agriculture-based community members of this 'sansad' have 4 numbers of power tiller, 1 defunct mini RLI, 8 pump sets and 42 STW to produce the crops. They do not have the real modern agriculture tools.

Seed, fertilizer and pesticides: There is no such fertilizer shop in this area. They are purchasing fertilizer and pesticide from 'Bhotpatty' and 'Helapakri Bazar' and Maynaguri towns at between 2 and 13 km distance. The seeds, normally, they are producing locally but in some cases they have to purchase from other places.

Traditional technologies: The farmers use traditional technologies include-tradition plaguing system by using cow, mud open well with liver system / manual water lifting system and hand boat for irrigation. Financial Resources:

Savings: More than 200 families opened the Bank account with rupees 300/- to 500/- initiated by SUS. Now villagers are depositing good amount of money i.e. roughly Rs. 6 lack in total.

Credit: The villagers have been getting loan from both formal and informal sectors. Recently 44 households have taken Rs. 355000/- from bank at 4–7 % interest per annum. Some of the households are taking loan from local money lender at 10% per month. One SHG has taken loan from NGO at 15% flat interest per annum.

Remittances: There are 14 households who are getting money by draft from long distance like Tamil Nadu, Mumbai, "Rajasthan" etc. as family members are migrated for livelihood. They are sending Rs. 3000 to 6000/- every 6 months. Three households are sending money outside for their child education.

Pensions-old age pensions: There are 34 old age persons who are getting pensions by taking initiatives by GUS and SUS.

Wages: There are good numbers of labor and most of them are unskilled. The unskilled labor is getting Rs. 80/- per day and skilled labor is getting Rs. 150/- per day and both cases they are also getting one time food at noon.

Cultural:

Cultural forms and practices: There are different cultural forms including: One Flock (lokogiti Ghosti) group led by local GP member (Anjali Roydakuya) and performing at district and state level platforms. New Yatra (Drama) team formed where 16 members from different age group trying to perform at their best. One "Kritan Dal" of 21 members is performing well and traditional culture alive.

Folk forms: The local folk "MecheniNach" belongs to SC community formed at every habitation and performing at least one time in a year before the "JalpeshMela" and "Durga puja".

Persons deriving livelihoods from cultural assets: There are around 20 families who are living on cultural assets and performing at different places.

State/PRI initiatives for preserving cultural assets: To preserving the cultural assets, the PRI has been organizing the training as well as giving the opportunity to perform at district and state level program. Ms. Anjali Dakua is recently performed at State level "Bhawiya Sangeet" programme held in January 2009.

Institutions:

SHGs: There are 23 women SHGs formed by PRI though they were limited to savings and credit. After the recent intervention of GUS and SUS, groups are aware of the concept of group dynamics as well as functioning better. Another 2 groups formed by SUS and supported by the GUS for mainstreaming the groups. The groups are involved in social works including sending the children to school regularly as well as keeping good relationship with GUS, PRI members, VEC etc. The groups are also participating in planning and implementing program.

Farmers Club: Initiative of SUS, one farmers club ("Sonali Farmars Club") formed by local 19 farmers through the support of NABARD and UBKGB.

Education: It was observed during the transact survey that while almost all children of eligible age were enrolled in schools, many were irregular. Some neighborhoods were too far from the closest school, and there is only one "Shishu Shiksha Kendra"(SSK) in the whole village. Also, some parents had issues with the regularity of teachers and the quality of their teaching.

Health: There is no Primary Health Centre in 'Khayerkhal', and one has to go to "Maynaguri" and Jalapiguri Sadar hospital for the slightest of ailments like fever, cold, diarrhea etc.

Agriculture and Irrigation: Agriculture in "Khayerrkhal" is hurt most by lack of irrigation facilities. There are only 43 Shallow Tube Wells among 353 families involved in agriculture of various scales, one defunct River Lift Irrigation system, and insufficient Hand Tube wells. Most of the households are using the temporary open well to irrigate their land.

Farmers' Club: Sonali Farmers Club is emerged as an effective institution in the rural areas as farmers have been benefited in all aspects of life. The people of the Khayerkhal farmers have long been interacting with existing and sustainable farmers club at other sansads. It is decided that farmers club will be formed by marginalized farmers and committed youths.

Roads, Culverts (Communication): Most roads across Khayerkhal are made of mud, and most of them get slushy or even flooded during the rainy season. The problem is all the more grave in the Sit-Bhutan, a neighborhood that gets virtually cut off from the rest of the village during monsoons.

Electrification: Domestic electricity connections have not reached Khayerkhal yet. This is a problem that hurts irrigation, education and health.

Women's SHGs: There are 22 women's SHGs in the village. However, they do little else than inter-loan with their group funds. Bank-credit is taken only for the men in the family who invest it in agriculture. Little happens by way of group’s enterprise.

Animal Husbandry: This was identified as a potential avenue for additional income. As of now, cattle and poultry is reared on a very small scale due to lack of proper training in the field.

Small scale enterprise: The group of local youths can be considered as resourceful team in this sansad as educated and skilled youths have long been Contacting with DIC and bank for entrepreneurship development. The need based action plan for the youths as well as KVIC project can be considered for socioeconomic development.

Drinking water: Many of the paras do not have PHE taps, and most do not have sufficient numbers. Many families were found to be drinking out of wells. The habit becomes all the more dangerous during the rainy season. Also, many of the existing PHE taps are not maintained properly. Water logged around them is not drained periodically, and many of the taps are seen surrounded by slush, moss and stagnant water.

SC/ST certificates: The majority of the Khayerkhal population belongs to the Scheduled Castes. Most, however, do not have certificates to this effect. Thus, they cannot avail schemes and reservations meant for them.

Cremation Ground: The larger sansad covering 17 habitations but do not have a cremation ground. The river "Khatimari and Saniajan" can be used for the purpose as well as people are committed to provide the land.

Fishery: There are a large number of small and medium-sized ponds across the village, apart from a big pond in the "Dhutiarbari" neighborhood. Few are utilized for piece-culture, though. Here lies a big scope for additional income.

Migration: A large number of families have members working in distant cities and towns as migrant laborers. This is mostly due to inadequate employment opportunities within the village.

== Geographical Situations ==
KhayerKhal village is just north of "Padamoti No-1, Gram Panchayet under Maynaguri Block in Jalpaiguri District, West Bengal. To the east of "Bhrumapur Sansad". Khayerkhal nearly 4–5 km away from the 'CoochBehar' District and to the south of Padamoti No. – 2 Gram Panchayet and the West of 'Uttar Padamoti Sansad'. It has one small river "Khatty Mari" and two deep West lands named "Chak Chaka" and "Magoshanidham" which divide the area into two parts. The road from Maynaguri to Mekhliganj_Block enters from the north and continues towards Padamoti No. 2 G.P. which is almost in the middle of the village. It is a 'hindu' dominated area. Most inhabitants are members of "Rajbanshi" Community and belongs to scheduled castes and they work in agriculture.

== Facilities ==
The village has one junior high school, three Primary schools, two ICDS Centre and One "Sishu Siksha Kendra" (SSK) and one continuing education Centre (CEC). Villagers go to Padamoti No-1 G.P. The Primary Health Centre is about 3 km from the village. The villagers have formed 23 Self Help Groups (S.H.G.), one farmers club(Sonali Farmers Club) and seven social and cultural clubs. The village has two playgrounds and many temples. One is over 100 years old (Magoshani Mandir). It was constructed by community contributions. Every year there is a festival for one day on the eve of "Mahanabami"(Durgapuja).

== More about ==
The khayerkhal sansad no. 17/76 of Padomoti-I Gram Panchayet, Maynaguri is a remote area where 96% of 534 households belong to schedule caste community and minority, as well as few of the habitations, are isolated by river and poor communication. The children were irregular in attending the primary schools and ICDS center as well as community members were not aware of the different schemes implemented by Gram Panchayet and government. SERVIK UNNAYAN SAMITY(SUS)(a local level institution) has been doing community mobilization programmed for ensuring the child education for all at 3 schools of this sansad and support to government scheme about health and livelihoods. During community mobilization programme it is evolved from the communities including PRI member, women SHG, youth group, and farmers that local level institution can be formed to revive the GUS and VEC for holistic development including child education.

Abbreviations: KVIC:Khadi and Village Industries Commission. STW:Small Tube Well. SHG:Self Help Group. HTW:Hand Tube Well. ICDS:Integrated Child Development Scheme. SRD:Strengthening Rural Decentralizations. SSK:Sishu Sikha Kendra. CBO/CBI:Community Based Organization, Institution. GP:Gram Panchayet. NREGA:National Rural Employment Guarantee Act. PHED:Public Health Engineering Department. GUS:Gram Unnayan Samity. PRI:Panchayeti Raj Institutions. RLI:Rural Level Irrigation NABARD:National Bank for Agriculture and Rural Development. DDM:District Development Manager. LMP:Local Medical Practitioner. ADO:Agriculture Development Officer. SC/ST:Scheduled Caste/Tribe. *SUS:Sarbik Unnayan Samity (Local based institution/organization)
