= Aghora Yoga =

Spiritual tradition originated in Northern India

Aghora Yoga (also referred to as Aghor) is a spiritual tradition that originated in Northern India around the 11th Century C.E. The word Aghor literally means "that which is not difficult or terrible"; according to its adherents, Aghor is a simple and natural state of consciousness, in which there is no experience of fear, hatred, disgust or discrimination. Accordingly, believers contend that any time that humans experience a state of discrimination, we limit our wholeness and fall prey to disruptive emotions such as anger, fear, jealousy, greed, and lust. The practices of Aghora Yoga today reflect reforms made in the 1960s, shifting the focus of Aghor to seeking a balanced life of selfless service and personal practice. Baba Bhagwan Ramji encouraged the practitioners of Aghor to follow the vamachara ("left-hand path") by embracing socially stigmatized and neglected people, such as street children and people with leprosy and other "untouchable" diseases. Today, the followers of Aghoreshwar Bhagwan Ramji have established a large network of schools, orphanages, medical clinics, or other social service projects.

== Teachings and practices ==
The modern teachings and practices of Aghor are known as Aghor Yoga. Aghor Yoga can be practiced by anyone without regard to religious or ethnic background and irrespective of whether s/he adopts traditional Aghori dietary practices. The essence of Aghor Yoga is that fundamentally humans are each an individual whole, at one with divine consciousness. Aghor Yoga believes that by learning to identify with one's wholeness, one becomes free from a limited way of being. As a result, the energy that was previously invested in limitation becomes accessible for being directed towards the greater good.

The teachings and practices of Aghor defy easy categorization. Some adherents classify Aghor as a non-dualistic (advaita) Hindu philosophy. Classic nondualism explains that only the one eternal Self – alternately referred to as God, Brahman, or Atman – is real. Accordingly, Aghor believes that all of humanity is a part of this higher Self. Beyond this, everything else in the universe is mere illusion (maya).

The teachings of Aghor are meant to be universal, transcending all particularities of Hinduism or Indian culture. The contemporary Aghor lineage of Baba Kinaram includes people from many religious faiths and countries of origin, including the United States and Europe. The lineage also recognizes great spiritual beings of all religions (such as Moses, Buddha, Jesus, and Mohammed) as abiding in the realized state of Aghor – that is existing in wholeness and at one with the Divine.

Aghor focuses on the idea of jivanmukta, or reaching liberation from material issues in this lifetime. Thus, one does not have to die before reaching a state of Aghor.

Any disciplined effort that one makes to connect with one's wholeness is called sadhana (spiritual practice). A consistent effort that is in tune with human nature, simple to comprehend, and easy to practice bears fruit. Such a spiritual practice is thought to connect one with fullness, and when one is full, that fullness overflows into the outward action of seva. Seva is the selfless service one contributes to the community and world. Sadhana and seva form the two foundational aspects of the Aghor Yoga Path.

=== Guru ===
A disciple of Aghor Yoga often relies on a Guru – a capable spiritual teacher – to provide guidance when forming their practice of sadhana and seva. The Aghor definition of the word Guru is "remover of doubt." The Guru is meant to function both as a bridge between outward action and spiritual wisdom, as well as an example of realization of the Aghor path. One distinguishing feature of the Aghor Yoga path is that the Guru is very accessible to the students. A bridge does not just provide a means of passage between two realms of thought; it is also a lookout point from which one can see the blessings floating on a sustenance-giving river.

The Guru is also believed to reside within all beings in the form of a higher Self. In order to form a conscious connection to one's own Self, a Guru is chosen for guidance. Eventually, it is hoped that an understanding of Gurupeeth (literally, the seat of the Guru) in oneself is formed.

There is no restriction of any kind in accepting a Guru. A Guru is a person in whose company one feels inspired and reminded of one's divinity and wholeness. In Aghor Yoga, a Guru is commonly a person who has walked the path and is willing and available to guide the practitioner in their own practice.

A Guru suggests a formal practice to the seeker. It is the responsibility of the seeker to cultivate their practice by aligning with the teachings. Though one is not required to follow the Guru's exact prescriptions, it is commonly accepted that one will pay careful attention to their Guru's teachings regarding spiritual practice and not try to modify or dilute them.

In Aghor Yoga the Guru instructs the seeker in the basics of sadhana (cultivation of a daily personal practice) and seva (their selfless service in the world). By incorporating the practices of sadhana and seva into everyday life, the student seeks to achieve a sense of peace and fulfillment through becoming better equipped to meet the challenges of modern life with calmness, grace and skill.

The Guru starts the practitioner on the path of Aghor Yoga through formal initiation by giving a personal mantra (a sound, syllable, or group of words that, with repetition, become spiritually transformative). In Aghor Yoga, one's mantra is regarded as a personal friend with its own personality, presence and characteristic. A mantra is also a thread that connects the practitioner with the spiritual powerhouse of all the enlightened beings from the Aghor lineage, thus the practitioner gains a sense of belonging to the family of enlightened beings. It is said, "You are never alone after receiving a mantra." Developing a friendship with one's mantra becomes the preoccupation of the practitioner.

== Concepts and terminology ==
Students of the Aghor Yoga tradition seek to attain Aghor, a state of consciousness in which one does not experience fear, hatred, disgust, discrimination, or hunger. One who achieves Aghor does not view the world in dualistic terms such as "dead" and "alive" or "edible" and "inedible", and so does not cast judgment upon themselves or others. A person who conscientiously practices these virtues is called an Aughar.

With constant practice, when one is established unwaveringly in the state of Aghor consciousness, a person becomes an Avadhut – a spiritually realized human being. Anyone from any religious, spiritual or ethnic background who has come to abide in the state of Aghor consciousness, regardless of the path that led to this state, is an Avadhut.

== History ==
The term "Aghor" has ancient origins which likely precede written history. One of the Five Faces of Shiva was known as Aghor. In the Shiva Purana, one of India's oldest legends, there is a hymn to the glory of Shiva by Pushpadanta, head of the Gandharva clan, called the Shiva Mahimnah Stotram. One of its Sanskrit verses reads:

Aghoranna paro mantro
Nasti tatvam Guro param.

The translation is: The very name of Aghor (Shiva, or the one who has attained the state of Aghor) is a mantra that is above all other mantras. There is nothing higher to be known than the real nature of the Guru (spiritual teacher). Thus, the hagiographic roots of the Aghor tradition are traced to Lord Dattatreya, an avatar of Shiva.

Aghor tradition believes that Jagadguru Dattatreya propounded the tradition of Aghor later followed in the Sixteenth Century by the great saint Baba Keenaram. The life story of Baba Keenaram tells of his wandering for years until he attained complete knowledge upon encountering Bhagwan Dattatreya, who appeared to him in the Girnar Mountains, a holy place in Gujarat state in northwest India.

Later in his life, Baba Keenaram settled in the holy city of Varanasi and wrote a book called Viveksar, recognized now as the most authentic treatise on the principles of Aghor. He claimed that the contents of Viveksar were revealed to him by Lord Dattatreya. Through this revelation, he saw that the whole world, the whole universe, is situated in each human body, a vast world perfect in all respects. Baba Keenaram later established an ashram in Varanasi, called Krim Kund. He initiated many social reforms during the tumultuous times of the Moghul invasion when the Indian people were being persecuted. The early devotees of Aghor comprised a diffuse network of wandering ascetics who passed down their beliefs and practices through oral teaching in many different lineages.

In the 1960s, the then-guru of the Baba Keenaram lineage, Baba Bhagwan Ramji (1937-1992), instituted reforms of the Aghor tradition, banning taboo substances such as alcohol, marijuana, and ashes. Baba Bhagwan Ramji "challenged his devotees to embrace polluted people instead of polluted substances." Aghor instead became focused on social reform, maintaining a vamachara tradition of spirituality by helping people who have been shunned from mainstream society, such as lepers and orphans.

When Baba Bhagwan Ramji attained Aghor in this lineage, he was compared to Baba Keenaram because he had a strong sense of social responsibility, identifying himself with suffering humanity. Numerous accounts describe how he helped struggling people to battle social injustices.

=== Lineage ===
The direct lineage of the twelve Aghoreshwars that began with Bhagwan Dattatreya extends from the sixteenth century until the present day.

1. Baba Kalu Ram (Bhagwan Dattatreya)
2. Aghoraacharya Baba Keenaram (16th century)
3. Baba Bija Ram
4. Baba Dhouta Ram
5. Baba Gaibi Ram
6. Baba Bhavani Ram
7. Baba Jainarayan Ram
8. Baba Mathura Ram
9. Baba Saryu Ram
10. Baba Dal Singar Ram
11. Baba Rajeshwar Ram
12. Baba Bhagwan Ramji
13. Baba Siddharth Gautam Ram

== Today ==
The Aghor tradition, which originated as confined and reclusive, has transformed since Baba Bhagwan Ramji's reforms to Aghor Yoga practices. By changing practices that have traditionally been shunned by conventional norms, Aghor Yoga now has entered mainstream society. Today, Aghor Yoga focuses upon forming a balanced personal practice, placing importance on both sadhana (one's own spiritual practice) as well as seva (selfless service).

=== Baba Bhagwan Ramji ===
Recognizing the need for change within his society, Baba Bhagwan Ramji renewed the socially conscious spirit of Baba Kinaram when he established a new ashram named Awadhut Bhagwan Ram Kusht Sewa Ashram (The Awadhut Bhagwan Ram Leprosy Service Ashram) at Parao, Varanasi. Baba Bhagwan Ramji dedicated Parao Ashram to helping the poor and the afflicted, and included a leprosy hospital within the ashram grounds. By shifting Aghor Yoga's focus to helping those who are suffering within society, Baba Bhagwan Ramji modernized the ancient Aghor tradition.

In order to maintain the continuum of the Aghor tradition, Baba Bhagwan Ramji initiated one of his disciples, Baba Siddharth Gautam Ram, to be the head of Krim Kund and of the Aghor lineage. The Krim Kund and Parao ashrams are situated on the opposite sides of the Ganges River in Varanasi, India.

Baba Bhagwan Ramji also established Sri Sarveshwari Samooh Ashram, a secular social service organization that has worked throughout northern India. The Aghor lineage now includes many Ashrams in various locations in India and a number of centers and Ashrams in other countries.

During his life, Aghoreshwar Bhagwan Ramji also guided the reform of ancient Kina Ram Aghori practices.

=== Ashrams ===
All of the ashrams started by Baba Bhagwan Ramji and his disciples around the world are continually dedicated to service. Contemporary Aghor practices focus especially on providing help and services to those who are downtrodden.

Sri Sarveshwari Samooh Ashram remains invested in social issues, notably working to eliminate the dowry system, offering free leprosy treatment, and providing free schooling for impoverished children.

The Sonoma Ashram in Sonoma, California, founded in 1990, is the current seat of Aghor Yoga in the United States. The mission of Sonoma Ashram is to foster spiritual growth in individuals.

The Sonoma Ashram's sister ashram, Aghor Foundation, was established in 2001 on the bank of the Ganges River in the Varanasi, India and offers a safe home for orphaned and abandoned children. The Aghor Foundation also operates other social service projects, including the Anjali School, a tuition-free school for neighborhood children living in poverty and Vision Varanasi, a free eye clinic. Notably, The Aghor Foundation also runs Project Shakti, which offers vocational training for underprivileged women in Varanasi. The Aghor Foundation recently began to construct the Amrit Sagar Environmental Center, "a working model of the best environmental practices and a teaching center demonstrating… sustainable practices."

== See also ==
- Aghori - a related Śaiva denomination
