= Shmashana =

Hindu cremation ground

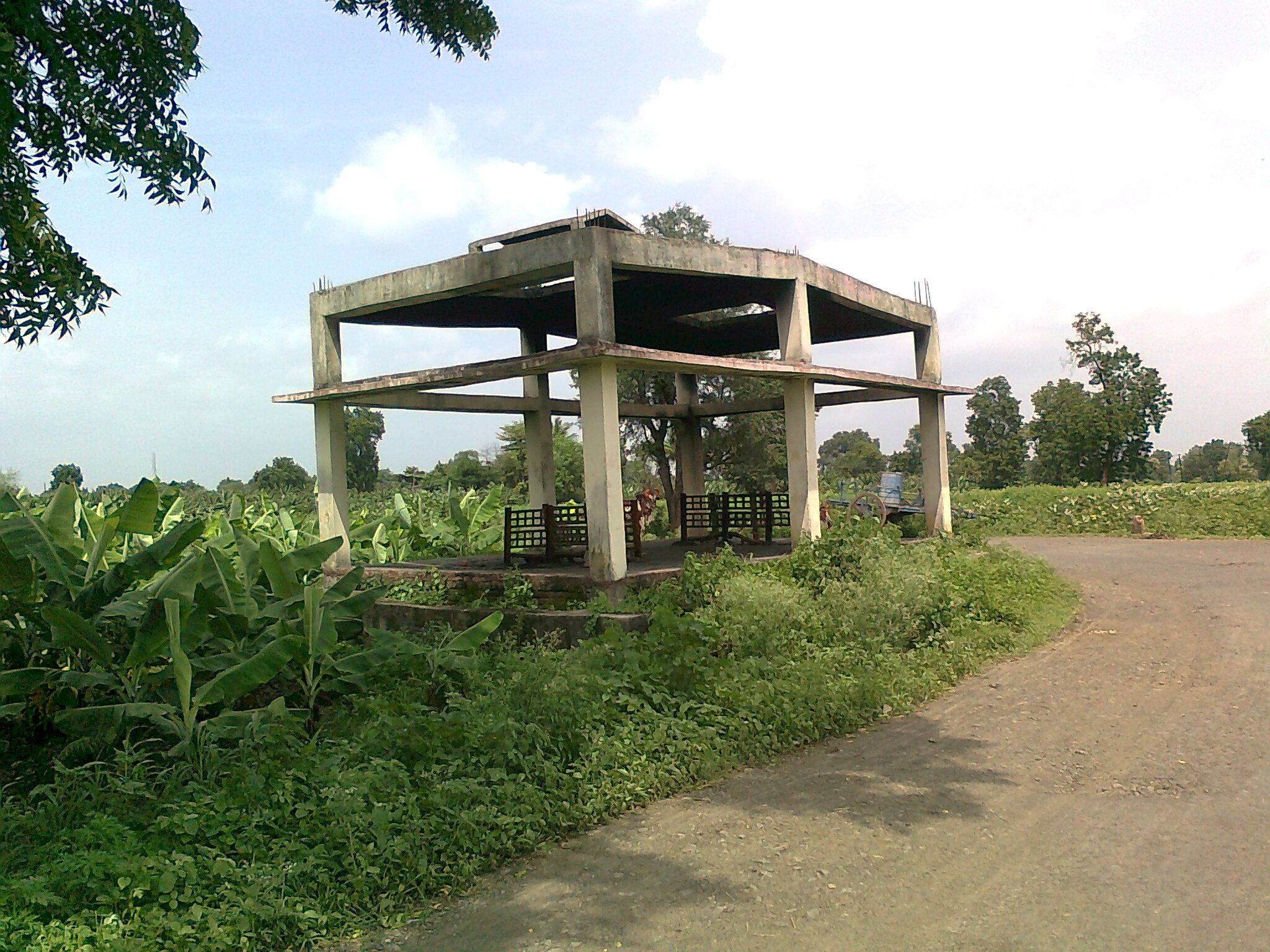
A shmashana outside an Indian village

A shmashana (Sanskrit: श्मशान, romanized: śmaśāna) is a Hindu crematory ground, where dead bodies are brought to be burnt on a pyre. It is usually located near a river or body of water on the outskirts of a village or town; as they are usually located near river ghats, they are also regionally called smashan ghats.

== Etymology ==
The word has its origin from Sanskrit language: shma refers to shava ("corpse"), while shana refers to shanya ("bed"). The other Indian religions like Sikhism, Jainism and Buddhism also use shmashana for the last rites of the dead.

== Hinduism ==
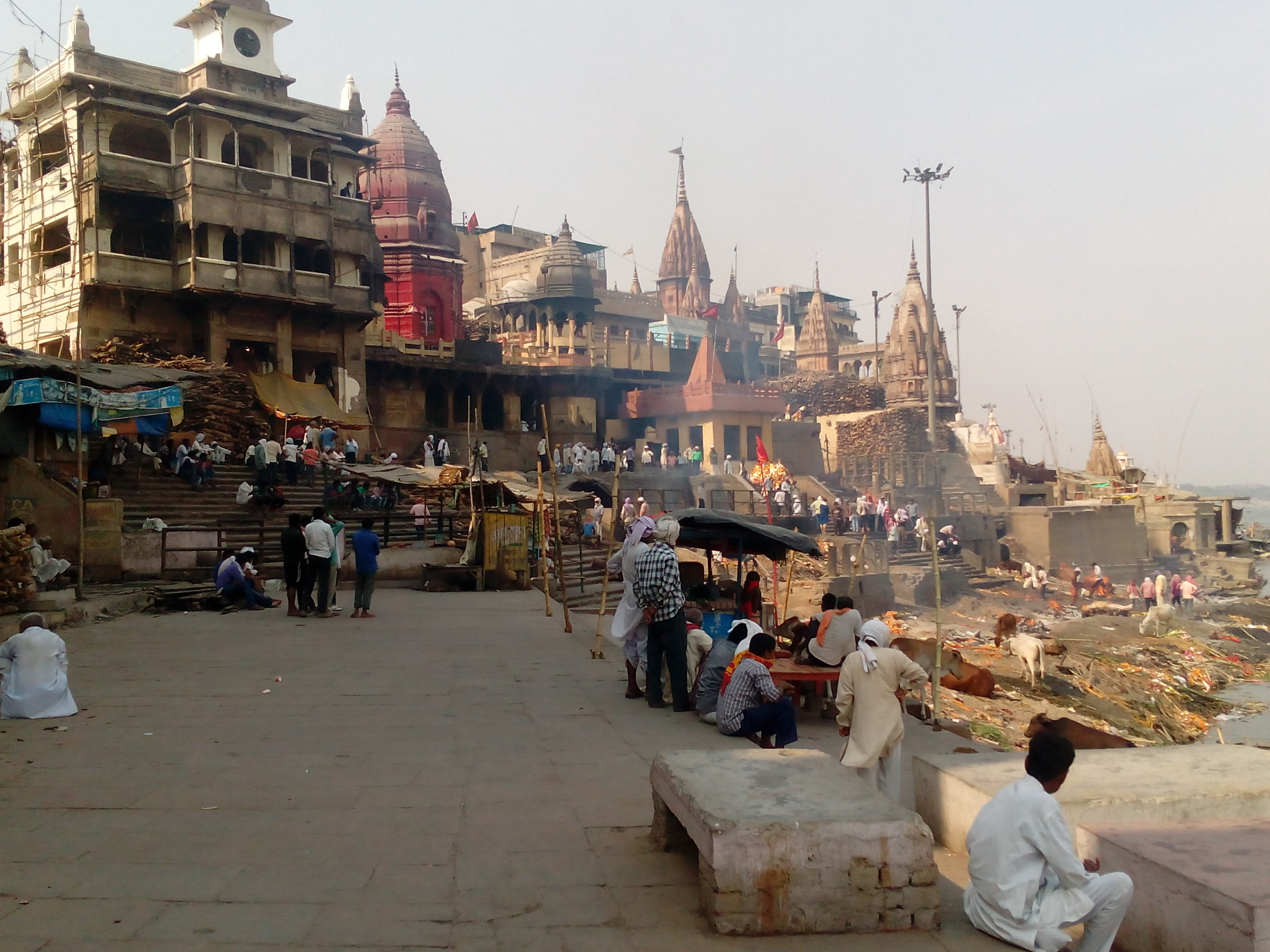
Manikarnika Ghat, a shmashana ghat at Varanasi, India

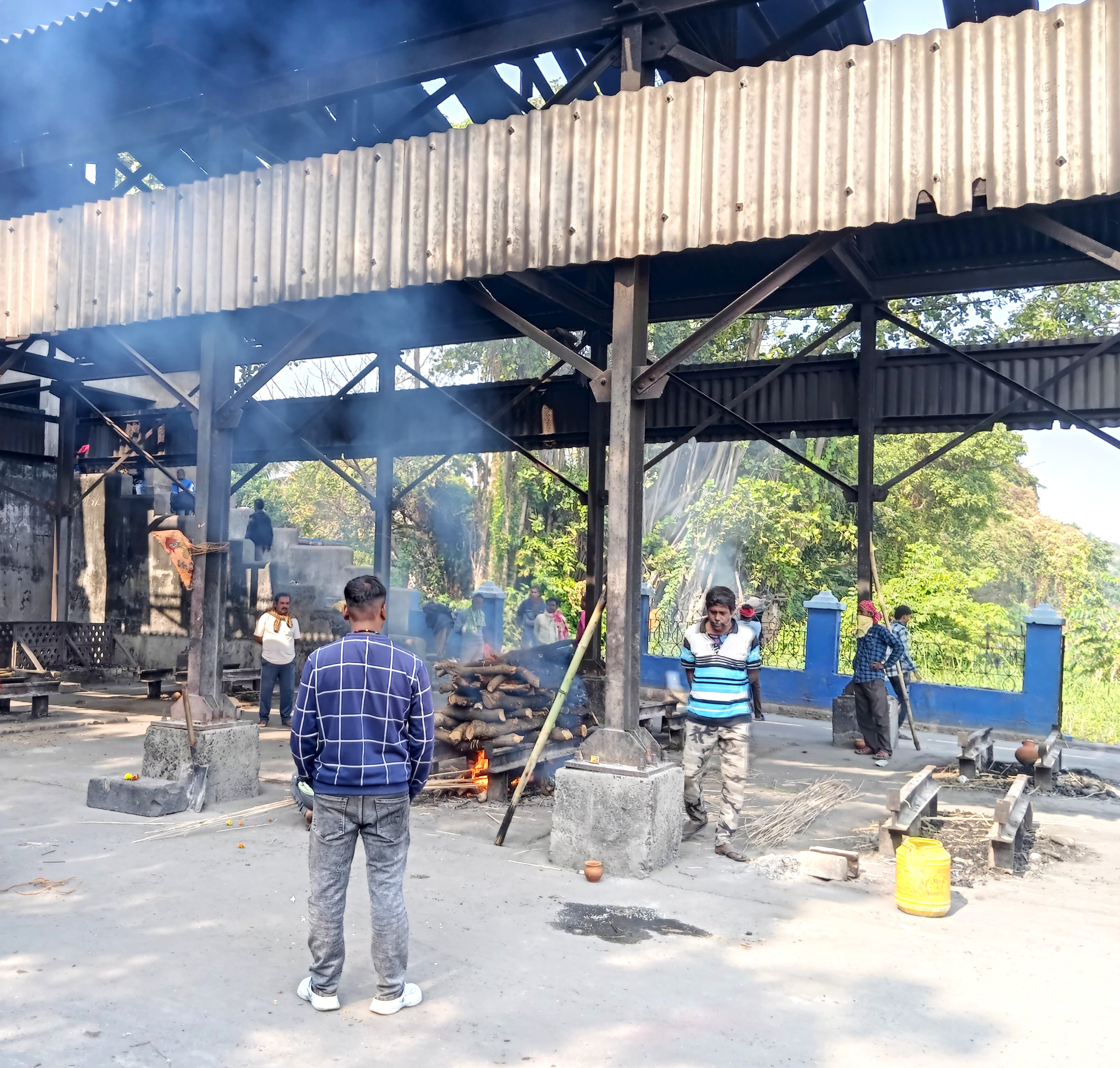
Tribeni Shmashana, Hooghly, West Bengal, India

As per Hindu rites of Nepal and India, the dead body is brought to shmashana for the ritual of antyesti (last rites). At the cremation ground, the chief mourner has to obtain the sacred fire from one who resides by the shmashana and light funeral pyres (chita) for a fee.

Various Hindu scriptures also give details of how to select the site of shmashana: it should be on the northern side of the village with land sloping towards the south, it should be near a river or a source of water and should not be visible from a distance.

Dead bodies are traditionally cremated on a funeral pyre usually made of wood. However, nowadays in many cities of India electric or gas-based furnaces are used in indoor crematoria.

== Jainism ==
The Jains also cremate the dead as soon as possible to avoid growth of micro-organisms. Ghee, camphor and sandalwood powder are sprinkled all over the body and the eldest son of the deceased does the last rituals, who lights up the pyre in shmashana, chanting the Namokar Mantra. After cremation, they sprinkle milk on that place. They collect the ashes but unlike Hindus, who immerse them in the water, the Jains dig the ground and bury the ashes in that pit and sprinkle salt in the pit.

== Early Buddhism ==
In the Pali Canon discourses, Gautama Buddha frequently instructs his disciples to seek out a secluded dwelling (in a forest, under the shade of a tree, mountain, glen, hillside cave, charnel ground, jungle grove, in the open, or on a heap of straw). The Vinaya and Sutrayana tradition of the "Nine Cemetery Contemplations" (Pali: nava sīvathikā-manasikāra) described in the Satipatthana Sutta demonstrate that charnel ground and cemetery meditations were part of the ascetic practices in Early Buddhism.

'Cemetery contemplations', as described in Mahasatipatthana Sutta (DN: 22) and the Satipaṭṭhāna Sutta (MN: 10):

...have as their objects a corpse one or two or three days old, swollen up, blue-black in colour, full of corruption; a corpse eaten by crows, etc.; a framework of bones; flesh hanging from it, bespattered with blood, held together by the sinews; without flesh and blood, but still held together by the sinews; bones scattered in all direction; bleached and resembling shells; heaped together after the lapse of years; weathered and crumbled to dust.

At the end of each of these contemplations there follows the conclusion: "This body of mine also has this nature, has this destiny, cannot escape it."

Similar are the 10 objects of loathsomeness (asubha q.v.).

—

== Spiritual role ==
A shmashana, also known as a cremation ground or burial ground, holds cultural, religious, and ritualistic significance in various Eastern spiritual traditions, including Hinduism and certain Tibetan Buddhist practices. The shmashana is said to be abode of ghosts, evil spirits, fierce deities, and tantriks. Therefore, people in general prefer to avoid going near shmashana at night. Women generally do not go to shmashana, only males go to shmashana to perform the last rites.

Followers of the modes of worship called Vamamarga like Aghori, Kāpālika, Kashmiri Shaivism, Kaula of now scarce Indian Tantric traditions perform sadhana (for example Shava sadhana) and rituals to worship Kali, Tara, Bhairav, Bhairavi, Dakini, Vetal, etc. invoke occult powers within them at a shamashana. The shmashana is also used for similar purpose by followers of Tibetan Buddhist traditions of Vajrayana, Dzogchen for sadhna of Chöd, Phowa, Zhitro, etc. The deity called Shmashana Adhipati is usually considered to be lord of the shmashana.

== See also ==
- Charnel ground
