= Shava sadhana =

Hindu tantric spiritual practice

Shava sadhana (śāva sādhanā) is a Tantric sadhana (spiritual practice) in which the practitioner sits on a corpse for meditation. Shava sadhana is part of the vamachara ('heterodox') practice of worship, which is followed by the esoteric Tantra.

Shava sadhana is regarded as one of Tantra's most important, most difficult and most secret rituals. Tantric texts as well as oral tales detail the process of the ritual and also tell its importance. The purpose of practicing the ritual range from knowledge, propitiating a deity, material motives, even dark objectives to gaining control over the spirit of the deceased. There are strict rules that need to be followed in the ritual, even in selection of a suitable corpse for the ceremony.

== Textual references and oral legends ==
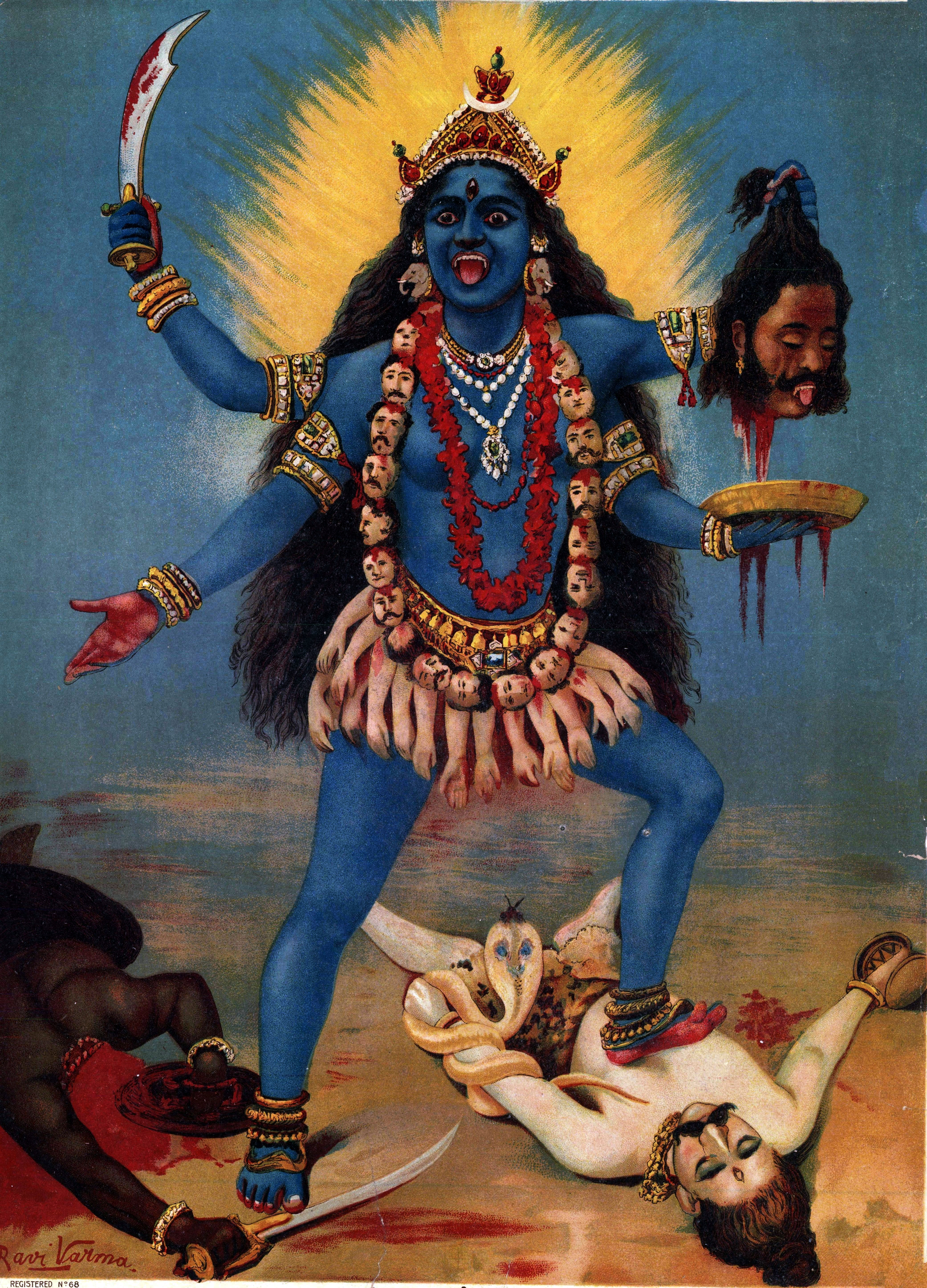
The goddess Kali (pictured) is believed to have given the poet Ramprasad Sen a vision due to the practice of shava sadhana.

The following Tantric texts detail the ritual process: Kaulavali-nirnaya, Shyamarahasya, Tara-bhakti-sudharnava, Purasharcharyarnava, Nilatantra, Kulachudamani and Krishnananda's Tantrasara. The Kali tantra says that those who worship goddess Parvati without shava sadhana will suffer in Naraka (hell) until dissolution of the world.

An oral tale about the shava sadhana is told by the Tantrikas of Bengal. Vasudeva Bhattacharya of Tipperah (West Bengal) went to the Goddess temple of Kamakhya and worshipped the deity by Tantric means. A voice told him about the ritual and that he will gain moksha in his next life when he will be reborn as his own grandson Sarvananda. Vasudeva gave his servant Purvananda an engraved copper plate with a mantra. Purvananda, now an old man, now served Sarvananda, who he passed the secret of shava sadhana ritual, told by his former master. Purvananda volunteered to be used as the corpse for shava sadhana and Sarvananda performed the ritual, where ghosts tormented him; storms tried to interrupt his practice; beautiful dancers tempted him, until the Goddess gave him a vision. She blessed him with vak siddhi, the ability to make something happen by just saying it. She also revived the servant. Sarvananda became a siddha and the first tantrika to see the theophany of the Goddess' ten mahavidya forms. The Shakta poet Ramprasad Sen is also told to have performed the ritual and gained the vision of his patron, goddess Kali.

== Aim and importance ==
Shava Sadhana is regarded the most important ritual in Shakta Tantra, particularly in West Bengal. Shaiva Aghoris from Varanasi are also known to practice this ritual. Shava sadhana is "the most secret part of Tantric mysticism" and is regarded one of the most "misunderstood" due to its non-Aryan nature. It is also regarded as the "most difficult form of spiritual practice". The sadhaka needs to adhere to all rules of the ritual and is warned that violation of the regulations may lead to dire consequences. Even a small mistake in the ritual can lead to death or insanity of the practitioner. Due to the intensity of consequences if the ritual is not properly done, a Tantric priest from Bolpur said that the ritual is rarely practiced in the area.

The purpose to do shava sadhana varies from person to person. An aim of shava sadhana is to unite the Kundalini with Param Shiva. From a yogic or Tantric point of view, it signifies detachment from the physical world, and uniting with the Absolute, identified with the male god Shiva, the Divine Mother Shakti or the abstract Brahman. The detachment leads to freedom from Samsara (the cycle of birth, death and reincarnation) and the adept goes beyond the orthodox concepts of purity and impurity; auspiciousness and inauspiciousness. The ritual is done using a corpse, considered a highly impure and inauspicious symbol in traditional Hinduism. Since it deals with directly encountering death, it is believed to lead to non-death, symbolized by longevity, wealth and power. The ritual is said to erase the fear of death from the practitioner's mind. It may also be conducted to placate a personal deity. For Aghoris, the purpose is not spiritual, but simply to acquire the skull for rituals or gain power over the soul of the deceased so that he can act as a medium to other spirits or acquire powers to control them. Andre Padoux interprets shava sadhana as black magic which is done to accomplish evil motives.

== Selection of the corpse ==
There are strict rules in the Tantra Shastra regarding the corpse. The corpse should be fresh and undamaged. No part of the body should be missing. There should not be deformity in any part; e.g. a one-eyed corpse would be rejected. The Tantrasara specifies that corpse may be human (preferred) or animal. In humans, the most preferred (maha-shava, great corpse) are a chandala (a child of a Shudra father and a Brahmin mother; an outcaste and the lowest of the mixed castes) who died due to drowning, lightning-strike, snake-bite, injury, or was killed by a stick, sword, spear, or other weapon; and a courageous young man who died in battle while fighting his enemy. Specific animals are also recommended in the text.

Bhattacharya suggests that the Tantrika may even murder to get hold of a suitable corpse for shava sadhana. A young chandala boy may be intoxicated and then killed by the tantrika by deceit. However, Professor McDaniel notes that tantrikas she met in Tarapith disagreed. They believed that the appropriate corpse is chosen by the Goddess herself and murdering someone for the ritual is interfering with the Goddess' work.

Some corpses are taboo for shava sadhana: that of a Brahmin (priest caste), of a cow (sacred Hindu animal), of a woman, of an aged man (age not specified), of a leper, of an "untouchable", of a beardless man, of a man whose genitals are not clearly visible, a man who died due to suicide or starvation/famine, of an apostate, and of a hen-pecked man. Though corpses of women are forbidden by the Tantrasara, a Tantric priest from Bolpur, West Bengal described how people used to use the corpse of a virgin girl for shava shadhana. The girl is believed to become the goddess Kali's vessel and speak in the ritual. In absence of human corpses or carcasses of specified animals, the carcass of any animal can be used. If even it is unavailable, a human figurine of Darbha (grass), rice, barley etc. can be used. In case an effigy cannot be made, sesame is sprinkled on the ground.

According to Hindu belief, death happens on two levels: a physical death and a ritual death. The latter happens only after the kapala kriya ritual of the funeral, when the skull of the burnt corpse bursts or a hole is opened in it so the prana (life force) exits it. The corpse used for shava sadhana thus in an intermediate stage between life and death.

== Process ==
Shava sadhana is conducted generally on a new moon day. The Tantrasara suggests for the eighth or fourteenth lunar day in a fortnight as well as Tuesdays are suitable for the ritual.

The sadhaka is left alone with the corpse in the night. The Tantrasara recommends the following for the ritual: a shmashana (cremation ground) or cemetery, or an abandoned house, a riverbank, a mountain, a battlefield, near a bilva tree or any other lonely place. The ritual is generally done in a shmashana. Siddha pithas, sacred places reputed to grant siddhis may be preferred for the ritual. The sadhaka repeats a mantra while bringing the corpse to the designated site of the ceremony to purify it.

In Shakta ritual as described in the Tantrasara, the corpse is worshipped with flowers and invoked as a form of Bhairava (a form of Shiva) and the seat of the Goddess and requested to awaken to please the Goddess. The corpse is washed and placed on tiger or deer skin or a bed of kusha grass. The hair and feet of the corpse may be tied. The corpse is believed to be a vessel of power while the rite is performed and tying the hair ensures that the energy does not escape. Another interpretation states that the bondage reflects the practitioner's desire to control the spirit of the corpse. Then, the sadhaka will sit on the corpse for meditation. In Shakta narratives, betel nut is put into the corpse's mouth and it is turned on its back and smeared with sandalwood paste. Shakta sandhakas draw a yantra on the back of the corpse and sit on it. The 64 yoginis and the guardians of the directions are worshipped with vegetarian offerings. The corpse-seat is again worshipped and the practitioner mounts the corpse like one sits on a horse. Another tradition says that the practitioner is expected to sit in Virasana ("the heroic pose"). The Tantrasara narrates that the practitioner should get off the corpse to draw a triangle or protective circle around him and the corpse or again to scatter mustard or sesame seeds in all directions.

While meditating, the practitioner (whose goal is detachment) should think on what makes the corpse (who was alive till a day after) different from him and other living beings and thus discover the knowledge of the living force within all living beings. He (or she) identifies with the corpse and contemplates on the ephemeral nature of the body, whose dissolution leads to the discovery of the living force within.

The sadhaka may also meditate on a deity. Offerings to the deity are put in the corpse's mouth. The practitioner may perform pranayama and meditate on his guru and the deity in his mind. He can also practice japa (repetition of a mantra or a deity's names or epithets), till the corpse promises him to grant his wish. He may encounter an Akashavani (a voice from the skies) which may try to tempt him with material things. He will experience terrifying visions and sounds as well as temptations; however the practitioner should remain untouched and concentrate on the meditation. Upon successful completion of the sadhana it is believed that the residing deity of the sadhana( Maa Tara / Mahadev ) appears before the sadhaka and the sadhaka would be blessed with Brahma-gyan and mantra-siddhi (a supernatural power to use a mantra) or become one with Shiva / shakti. Uniting with Shiva-shakti is said to lead to detachment, a characteristic of the ascetic god. Shiva is himself equated with shava, the corpse. As the vessel of Shiva, the adept becomes an avadhuta, a mystic who is beyond egoic-consciousness, duality and common worldly concerns. The Tantrasara says that a voice may ask for more offerings or bless the practitioner by granting his wishes. Only rarest of the rarest sadhakas such as Krishnananda agamavagisha , sadhaka bamakhepa and ramprasad sen are said to have completed this sadhana successfully and believed to have seen the divine vision of Devi kali and Tara.

Shakta practitioners are said to have a theophany of the Goddess, in the form of a young girl or woman or in the sky or she may possess the corpse. The Shakta practitioner is considered to be a child of the Divine Mother, who is surrounded by fear, tormented by ghosts and demons and overcome with love towards her and needs to be rescued by the Mother. When the Goddess is said to possess the corpse, the corpse is considered sacred as a murti or vessel of the divine spirit. The head of the corpse is said to turn towards the devotee and begins speaking affectionately (or sometimes terrifyingly) with him. The devotee then asks for a boon (spiritual or worldly) that the Goddess is compelled to grant. Some practitioners regard that his own body becomes a corpse while performing the ritual. The Goddess fills life into him by possessing him.

A sadhaka who becomes afraid when the corpse comes alive and falls inside the protective circle, dies; while one who falls outside is doomed to eternal insanity. The one who remains resolute is blessed with moksha (salvation) and "occult powers". Persons who practice shava sadhana with lower goals may be blessed with siddhis, but those in turn may lead to their downfall.

At the end of the ritual, the corpse is freed from his bondage of rope and bathed again. The corpse is buried or immersed in a body of water. All articles of worship are also cast into the water. The untying of the rope and immersion of the corpse is believed to release the contained energy, accumulated while the ritual was on.

Although it is generally recommended to be performed alone in a deserted place, a sadhu who performs shava sadhana may be sometimes aided by his Tantric female consort, who are known as uttara sadhika. She stays within the protective circle and helps the sadhu if he is getting distracted by the spirits. The sadhu may also call upon his guru (not physically present at the site) to protect him in the ritual.

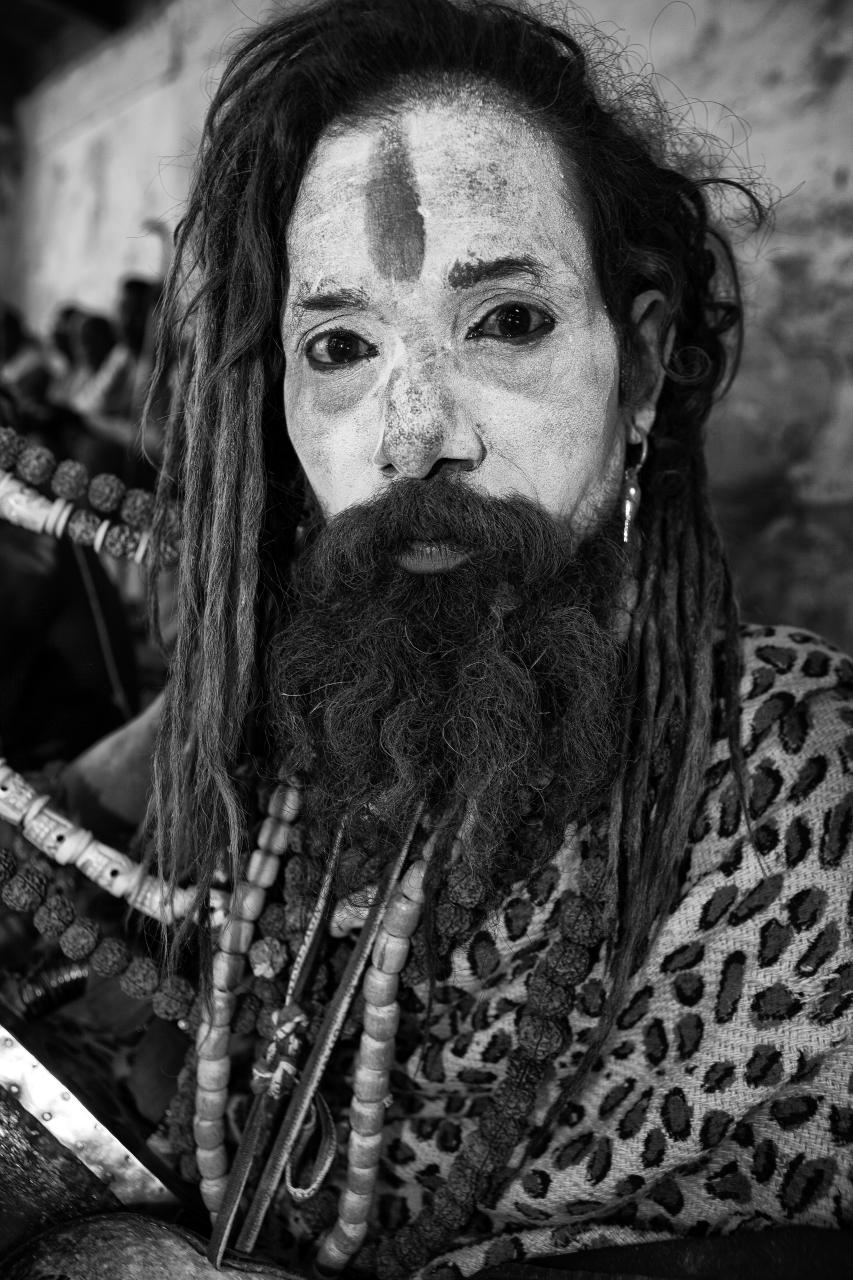
Aghoris of Varanasi are recorded to perform shava sadhana.

The Aghoris of Varanasi perform shava sadhana with some difference in the ritual. The corpse is bound to a stake at the wrist or ankle by a silken thread and a protective circle drawn around it to keep evil spirits of the cremation ground away. The spirits are offered meat and liquor outside the circle. The spirits would try to talk with the practitioner and gain entry in the circle but he should ignore them until finally he will conquer them, forcing them to accept his offerings and leave. This is signified by the corpse's mouth opening a bit. An offering of kheer is put in the corpse's mouth. Finally, the Aghori decapitates the corpse to acquire its skull or extracts a bone from its spine to gain control over its soul. The remaining body is cast in the river. The rite should be followed by a period of asceticism to gain mastery of the soul of the deceased. While the Aghori sits on the corpse's chest and meditates, the ojha (exorcist or wizard) performs the ritual by seating on the stomach of the deceased.

== Related rituals ==
Drinking of panchagavya and feeding of twenty-five Brahmins is prescribed with the rite. God is believed to possess the sadhaka for a fortnight after the ritual. He should stay away from material pleasures like coitus, dance and music in this period.
