= Sutrayana =

Sūtrayāna (Sanskrit: सूत्रयान) is the Indo-Tibetan three-fold classification of yanas. A yana is a Buddhist mode of practice that leads to the realization of emptiness. The three yanas of the Sutrayana are Sravakayana or Pratyekabuddhayana, Mahayana, and Vajrayana. The third yana, Vajrayana, comprises Tantrayana and Dzogchen.

Most often, Sūtrayāna is a classification used in the Vajrayāna to refer to the vehicles of Śrāvakayānana and Mahāyāna, based on the sutras, as a whole. In this context, Sūtrayāna is also known as the causal vehicle, as the six Paramita, thirty-seven factors of enlightenment, ethical and intellectual disciplines and a variety of methods are practiced as causes for achieving the final result. Buddhahood emerges as the result when all such causes are complete. Vajrayāna, vehicle based on Mahāyāna, and on the sutras as well as on the tantras, is also known as the resultant vehicle because the path is not based only on establishing the cause, but identifying directly with the fruition — the fundamentally pure essence of mind, or Buddha-nature.
