= Kapalika =

Medieval Tantric tradition of Shaivism

The Kāpālika (Sanskrit : कापालिक) tradition was a Tantric, non-Puranic form of Shaivism which originated in medieval India between the 4th and 8th century CE. The word is derived from the Sanskrit term kapāla, meaning "skull", and kāpālika can be translated as the "skull-men" or "skull-bearers".

== History ==
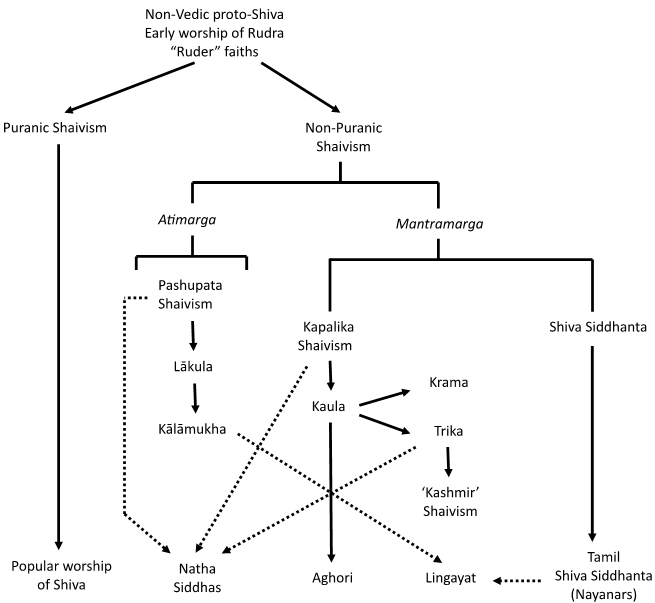
The Kāpālika tradition and its offshoots in Shaivism

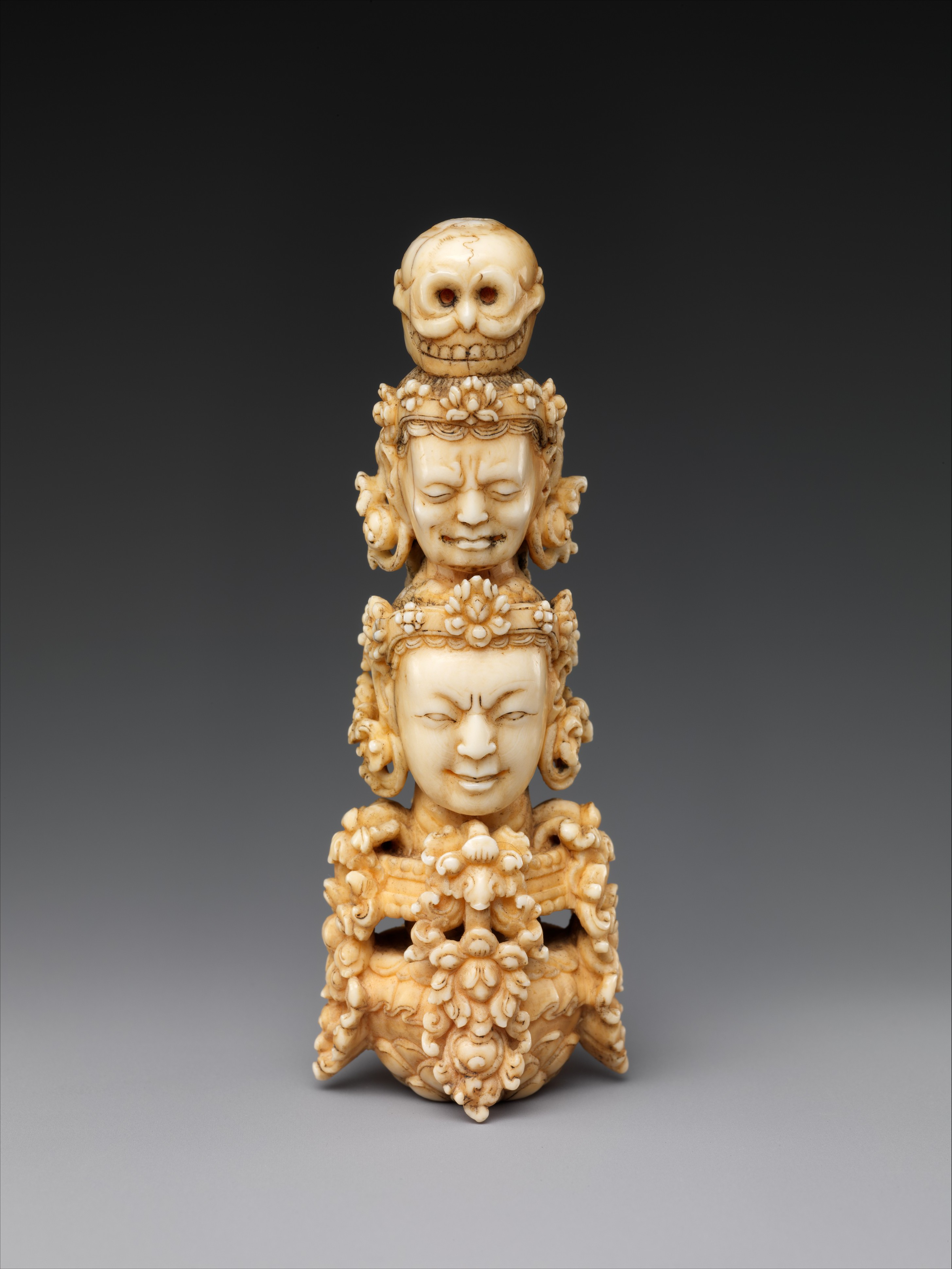
In Vajrayāna Buddhism, the symbol of the skull-topped trident (khaṭvāṅga) is said to be inspired by its association with the Kāpālikas. Pictured here is an ivory khaṭvāṅga, 15th-century Chinese art, Metropolitan Museum of Art, New York City.

The Kāpālikas were an extinct sect of Shaivite ascetics devoted to the Hindu god Shiva dating back to the 4th century CE, which traditionally carried a skull-topped trident (khaṭvāṅga) and an empty human skull as a begging bowl. Other attributes associated with Kāpālikas were that they revered the fierce Bhairava form of Shiva by emulating his appearance, behavior, dress, and characteristics, smeared their body with ashes from the cremation grounds, wore their hair long and matted, and engaged in transgressive rituals such as sexual intercourse with lower-class women, human sacrifices, consumption of meat and alcoholic beverages, and offerings involving orgiastic sexuality and sexual fluids.

According to David Lorenzen, there is a paucity of primary sources on the Kāpālikas, and historical information about them is available from fictional works and other traditions who disparage them. Various Indian texts claim that the Kāpālikas drank liquor freely, both for ritual and as a matter of habit. In the 7th century CE, the Chinese Buddhist monk and scholar Hsüan Tsang wrote about the Kāpālikas twice in the travelogue of his journey to the Indian subcontinent (629–645 CE): in his first biographical account, he reportedly met Indian Buddhists living with naked ascetics who covered themselves with ashes and wore bone wreathes on their heads, but Hsüan Tsang does not call them Kāpālikas or any particular name. Historians of Indian religions and scholars of Hindu studies have interpreted these ascetics variously as Kāpālikas, Jain Digambara monks, or Shaivite Pāshupatās. In the same memoir, Hsüan Tsang retells of a doctrinal conflict between the medieval King Śīlāditya I (r. 590–615 CE), a follower of Mahāyāna Buddhism and devotee to the Nālandā monastery, and a group of Hīnayāna Buddhist monks; the latter group are mocking him and the Mahāyāna Vehicle as heretical by comparing them to the Kāpālikas:

The Buddhist priests of this country all study the Hīnayāna and do not have faith in the Mahāyāna. They consider that it is [a doctrine only] of the "sky-flower" heretics, not the word of the Buddha. When they saw the King after his arrival, making fun of him, they said: "We have heard that the King has made by the side of the Nālandā Monastery a vihāra covered with brass plates, an extremely imposing and admirable work. Why did you not construct it in the monastery of the Kāpālika heretics or in some other [place like that]?" The King answered: "Why such words?" In reply, they said: "Because the Monastery of Nālandā with its "sky-flower" heretics is not different from those Kāpālikas".

In his work Yoga: Immortality and Freedom (1958), the Romanian historian of religion and University of Chicago professor Mircea Eliade remarks that the "Aghorīs are only the successors to a much older and widespread ascetic order, the Kāpālikas, or "wearers of skulls"." The Kāpālikas were more of a monastic order, states Lorenzen, and not a sect with a textual doctrine. The Kāpālika tradition gave rise to the Kulamārga, a subsect of Tantric Shaivism which preserves some of the distinctive features of the Kāpālika tradition. Several of the Kāpālika practices and symbols are found in Vajrayāna Buddhism, and scholars disagree over which tradition influenced the other. Today, the Kāpālika tradition survives within its Shaivite offshoots: the Aghorī order, Kaulā, and Trika traditions. In medieval India, at least 24 sites of Shaivite pilgrimage venues for the Kāpālikas were listed in the Hindu Tantras: among these, Mahākālapīṭha in Avanti (modern-day Ujjain) was a known Kāpālika stronghold, followed by the towns of Vārāṇasī, Tripurā, Khajuraho, Buvaneshvara, and Shrīparvata.

== Literature ==
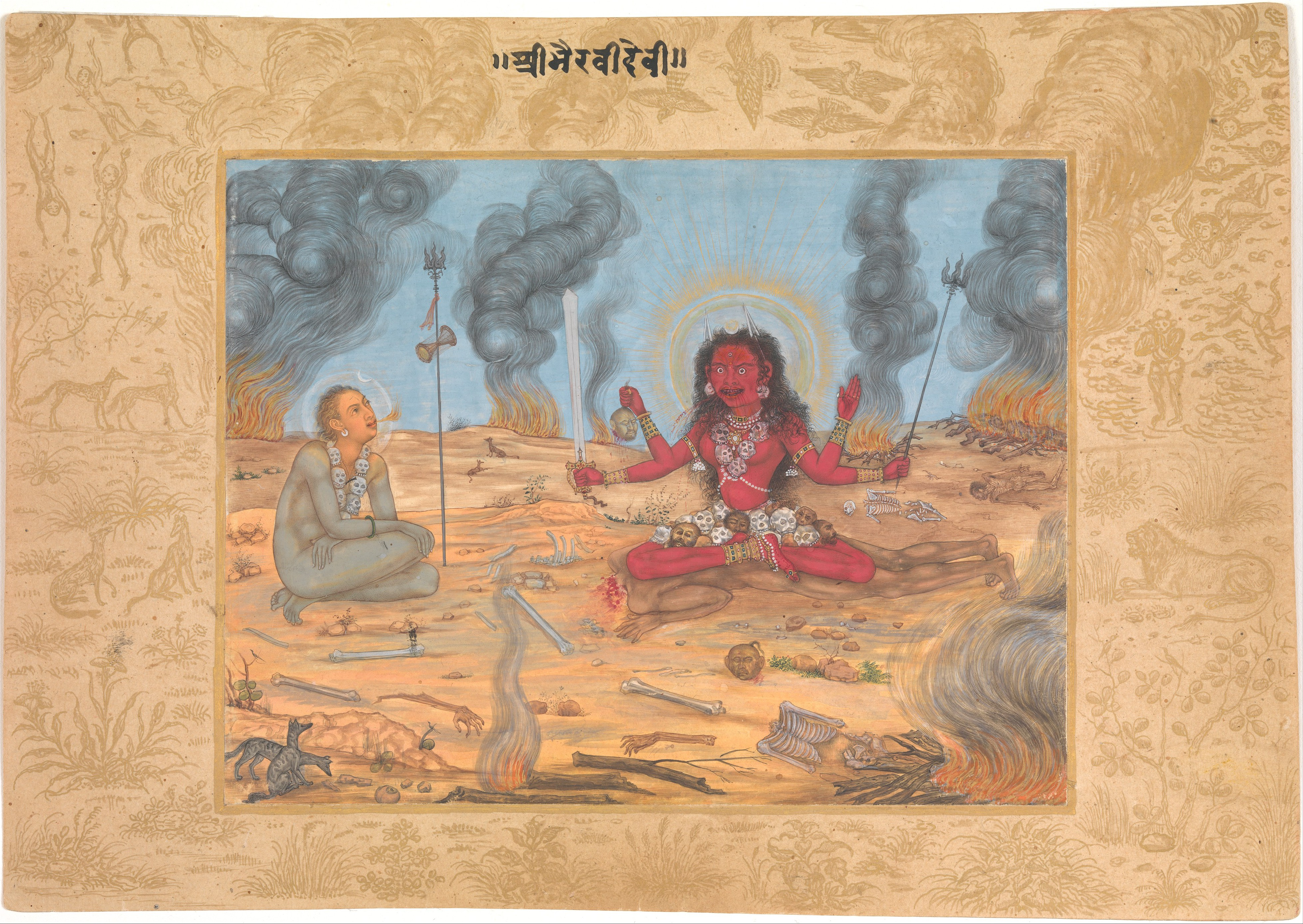
Tantric goddess Bhairavi and her consort Shiva depicted as Kāpālika ascetics, sitting in a charnel ground. Painting by Payāg from a 17th-century manuscript (c. 1630–1635), Metropolitan Museum of Art, New York City.

Mark S. G. Dyczkowski holds the Gaha Sattasai, a Prakrit poem written by Hāla (3rd to 4th century CE), to be one of the first extant literary references to an early Indian Kāpālika ascetic:

One of the earliest references to a Kāpālika is found in Hāla's Prakrit poem, the Gāthāsaptaśati (third to fifth century A.D.) in a verse in which the poet describes a young female Kāpālikā who besmears herself with ashes from the funeral pyre of her lover. Varāhamihira (c. 500-575) refers more than once to the Kāpālikas thus clearly establishing their existence in the sixth century. Indeed, from this time onwards references to Kāpālika ascetics become fairly commonplace in Sanskrit ...

The Act III of Prabodha Chandrodaya, a Sanskrit and Maharashtri Prakrit play written by Kirttivarman's contemporary Shri Krishna Mishra (11th to 12th century), introduces a male Kāpālika ascetic and his consort, a female Kāpālini, disrupting a dispute on the "true religion" between a mendicant Buddhist wanderer and a Jain Digambara monk. The latter ones, convinced by the Kāpālika couple to give up their vows to celibacy and renunciation by drinking red wine and indulging in sensual pleasure with women, end up rejecting their former religions and convert to Shaivism after having embraced the Kāpālika's faith in Shiva Bhairava as the Supreme God and his wife Parvati.

== See also ==
- Aghori
- Kashmir Shaivism
- Kaula
- Mahasiddha
- Mattavilasa Prahasana
- Pashupata Shaivism
- Vajrayana
