= Aghori =

Tantric Shaivite tradition and monastic order

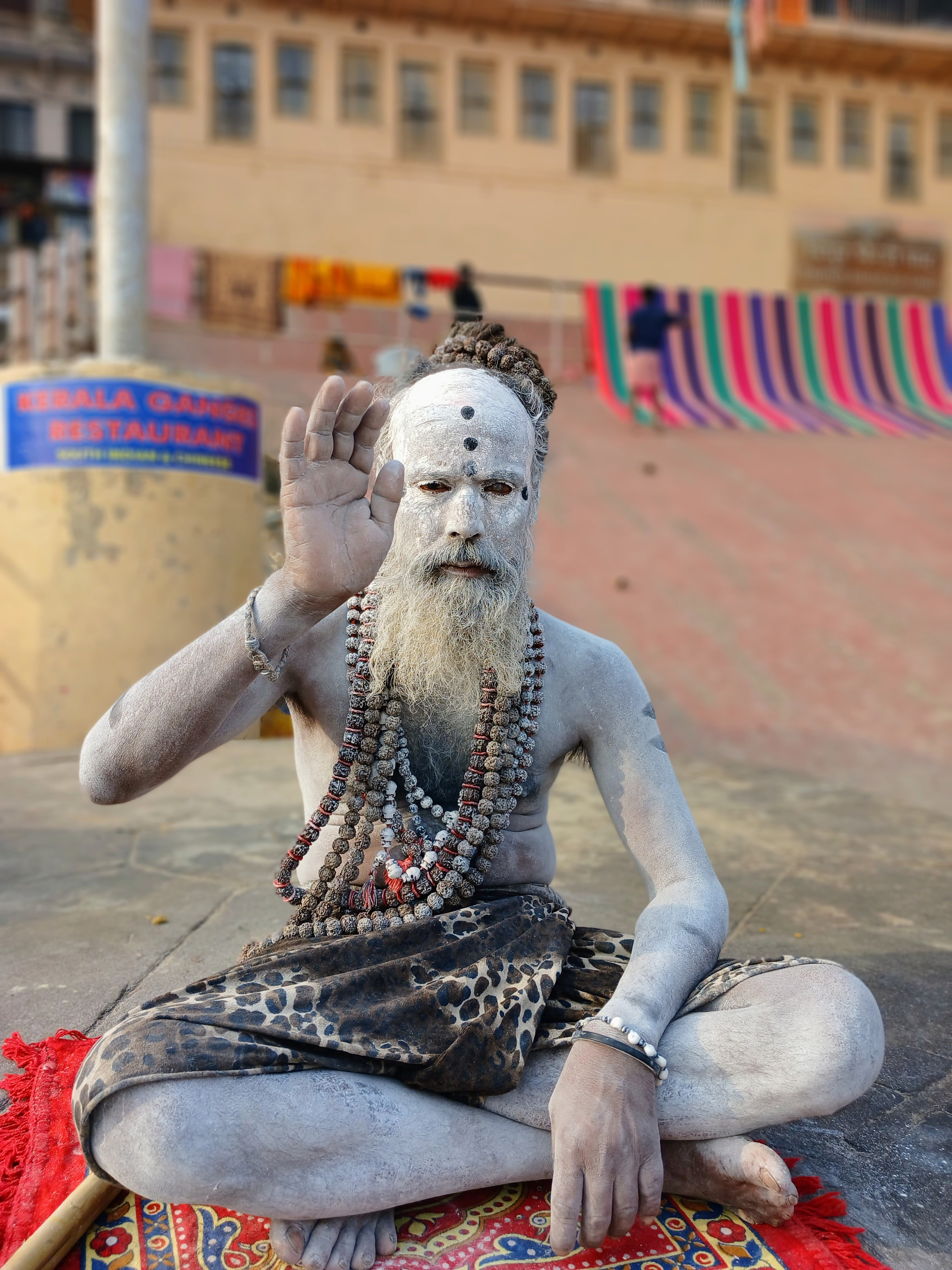
- An Aghori at a ghat in Varanasi

Total population
- A few thousand

Regions with significant populations
- Varanasi, North India

The Aghori (from Sanskrit: अघोर, lit. 'not dreadful', 'dreadless', IAST: aghora) are a Tantric Hindu monastic order of ascetic Shaivite sadhus based in Uttar Pradesh, India. They are the only surviving sect derived from the Kāpālika tradition, a Tantric, non-Puranic form of Shaivism that originated in Medieval India between the 4th and 8th centuries CE.

Like their Kāpālika predecessors, the Aghori engage in post-mortem and strongly antinomian practices. They often dwell in charnel grounds and cremation grounds, cover or smear their bodies with cremation ashes, and use human remains, including bones, to make jewellery and kapāla, or skull cups, of the kind Shiva and other Hindu deities are often iconographically depicted holding or using. Their antinomian practices include consuming ordure and human corpse-flesh. They practice this post-mortem cannibalism by eating flesh from foraged corpses, including bodies obtained from cremation ghats. Some Aghori also consume an intoxicating drink of bhaṅga.

The Aghori venerate a tradition of gurus and worship Śiva in the form of Aghora, or the goddess as Śītalā, Parnagirī or Kālī. Their practices are sometimes considered contrary to orthodox Hinduism. Many Aghori gurus command great reverence among rural populations and are widely referred to in medieval and modern works of Indian literature, being reputed to possess healing powers acquired through intensely eremitic rites and practices of renunciation and tápasya. Aghori gurus were traditionally not cremated after death, but buried in an upright meditation posture.

== Beliefs and practices ==
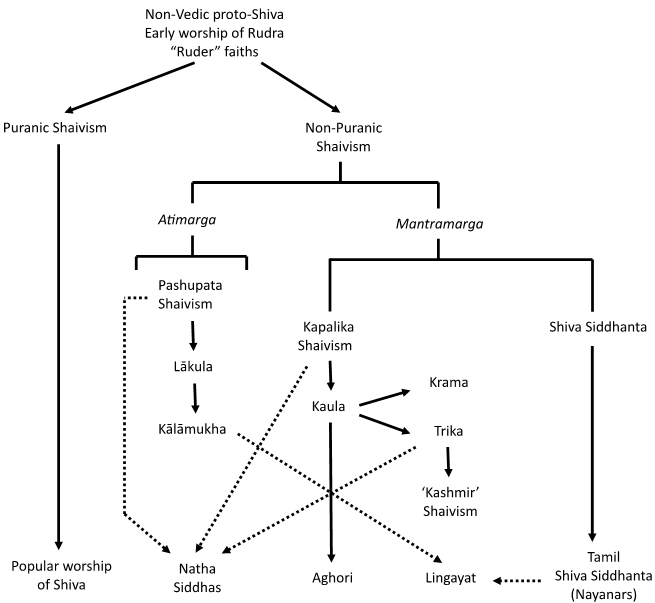
The Aghorī tradition and its precursors within Shaivism

Aghoris are Hindu devotees of Shiva manifested as Bhairava, and ascetics who seek liberation (mokṣa) from the endless cycle of birth, death, and rebirth (saṃsāra). This freedom is attained through the knowledge that the Self (ātman) is identical to the eternal and formless metaphysical Absolute called Brahman. Because of their monistic doctrine, the Aghoris maintain that all opposites are ultimately illusory. The purpose of embracing intoxicant substances, pollution, and physical degradation through various Tantric rituals and customs is the realisation of non-duality (advaita) transcending social taboos, attaining what is essentially an altered state of consciousness and perceiving the illusory nature of all conventional categories.

Aghori rituals, which are performed precisely to oppose notions of purity commonplace in orthodox Hinduism, are typically macabre in nature. The practices of Aghoris vary and include living in cemeteries, smearing cremation ashes on their bodies, using human skulls for decoration and bowls, smoking marijuana, drinking alcohol, and sitting in meditation on top of corpses. Although contrary to mainstream Hinduism, these practices exemplify the Aghori philosophy of criticising commonplace social relations and fears through the use of culturally offensive acts. Furthermore, they demonstrate the Aghoris' acceptance of death as a necessary and natural part of the human experience.

Another unusual Aghori belief is that they attribute spiritual and physical benefits, such as the prevention of ageing, to the consumption of human flesh. In 2006, an Indian TV crew witnessed one Aghori feasting on a corpse discovered floating in the Ganges and a member of the Dom caste reports that Aghori often take bodies from cremation ghats (or funeral pyres).

== History ==
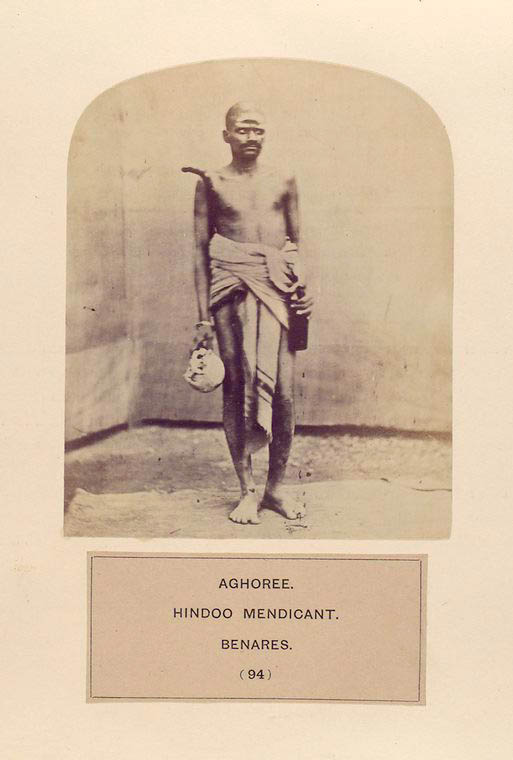
An Aghori with a human skull, c. 1875

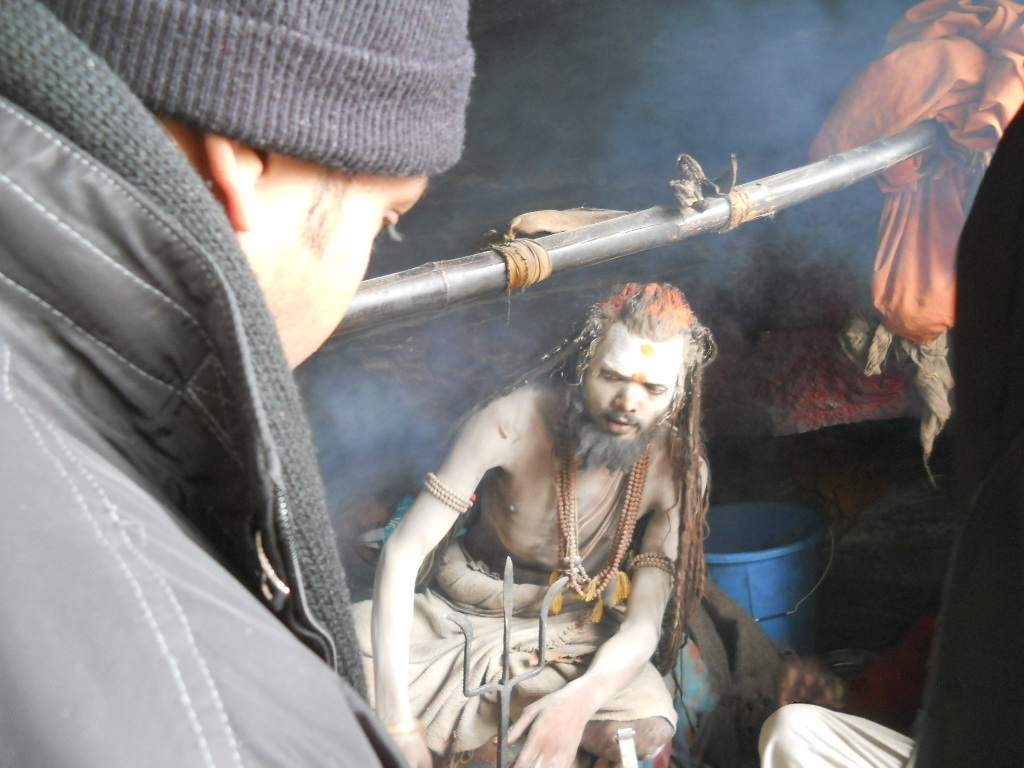
An Aghori in Satopant

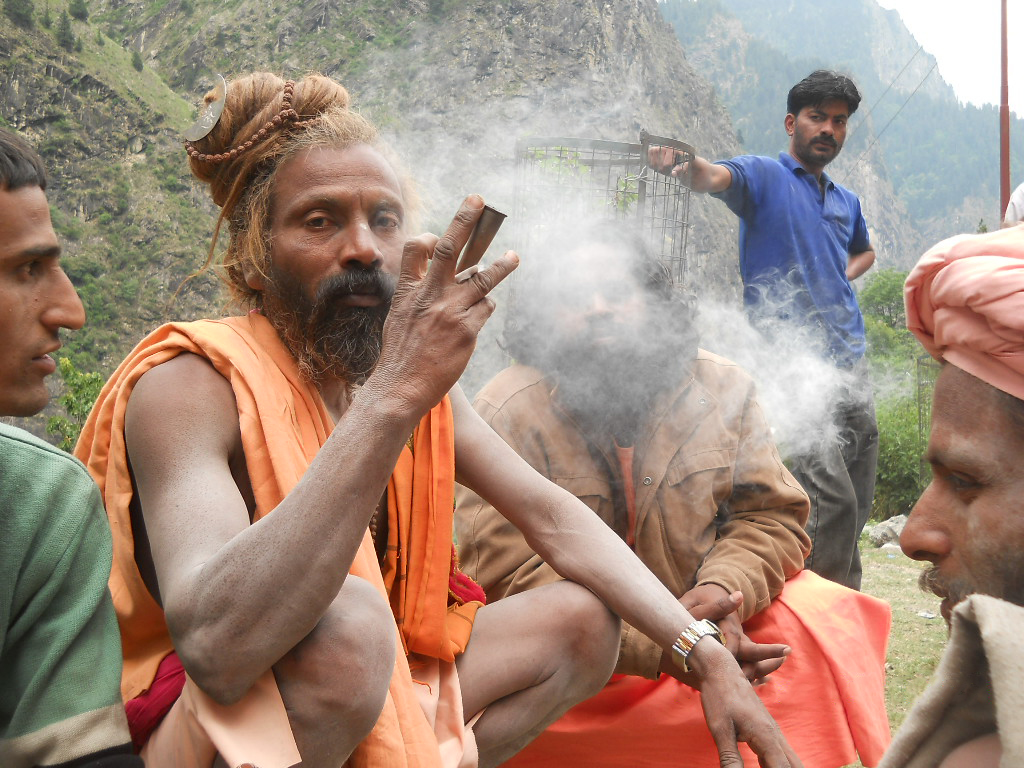
An Aghori in Badrinath smoking hashish or cannabis from a chillum

In his book Yoga: Immortality and Freedom (1958), the religion scholar Mircea Eliade remarks that the "Aghorīs are only the successors to a much older and widespread ascetic order, the Kāpālikas, or 'wearers of skulls'." According to David Lorenzen, there is a paucity of primary sources on the Kāpālikas, and historical information about them is available from fictional works and other traditions who disparage them. Various Indian texts claim that the Kāpālikas drank liquor freely, both for ritual and as a matter of habit. The Chinese pilgrim to India in the 7th century CE, Xuanzang, in his memoir on what is now Northwestern Pakistan, wrote about Buddhists living with naked ascetics who covered themselves with ashes and wore bone wreathes on their heads, but Xuanzang does not call them Kāpālikas or any particular name. Historians of Indian religions and scholars of Hindu studies have interpreted these ascetics variously as Kāpālikas, Jain Digambara monks, and Pashupatas.

The Kāpālikas were more of a monastic order, states Lorenzen, and not a sect with a textual doctrine. The Kāpālika tradition gave rise to the Kulamārga, a subsect of Tantric Shaivism which preserves some of the distinctive features of the Kāpālika tradition. Some of the Kāpālika Shaiva practices are found in Vajrayana Buddhism, and scholars disagree on who influenced whom. Today, the Kāpālika tradition survives within its Shaivite offshoots: the Aghori order, Kaula, and Trika traditions.

Although akin to the Kāpālika ascetics of Medieval India and Kashmir, as well as the Kālāmukha of the Deccan Plateau, with whom there may be a historical connection, the Aghoris trace their origin to Baba Keenaram, a Shaivite ascetic who is said to have lived 150 years, dying during the second half of the 18th century. Dattatreya the avadhuta, to whom has been attributed the esteemed nondual medieval song, the Avadhuta Gita, was a founding adi guru of the Aghor tradition according to Barrett (2008: p. 33):

Lord Dattatreya, an antinomian form of Shiva closely associated with the cremation ground, who appeared to Baba Keenaram atop Mount Girnar in Gujarat. Considered to be the adi guru (ancient spiritual teacher) and founding deity of Aghor, Lord Dattatreya offered his own flesh to the young ascetic as prasād (a kind of blessing), conferring upon him the power of clairvoyance and establishing a guru-disciple relationship between them.

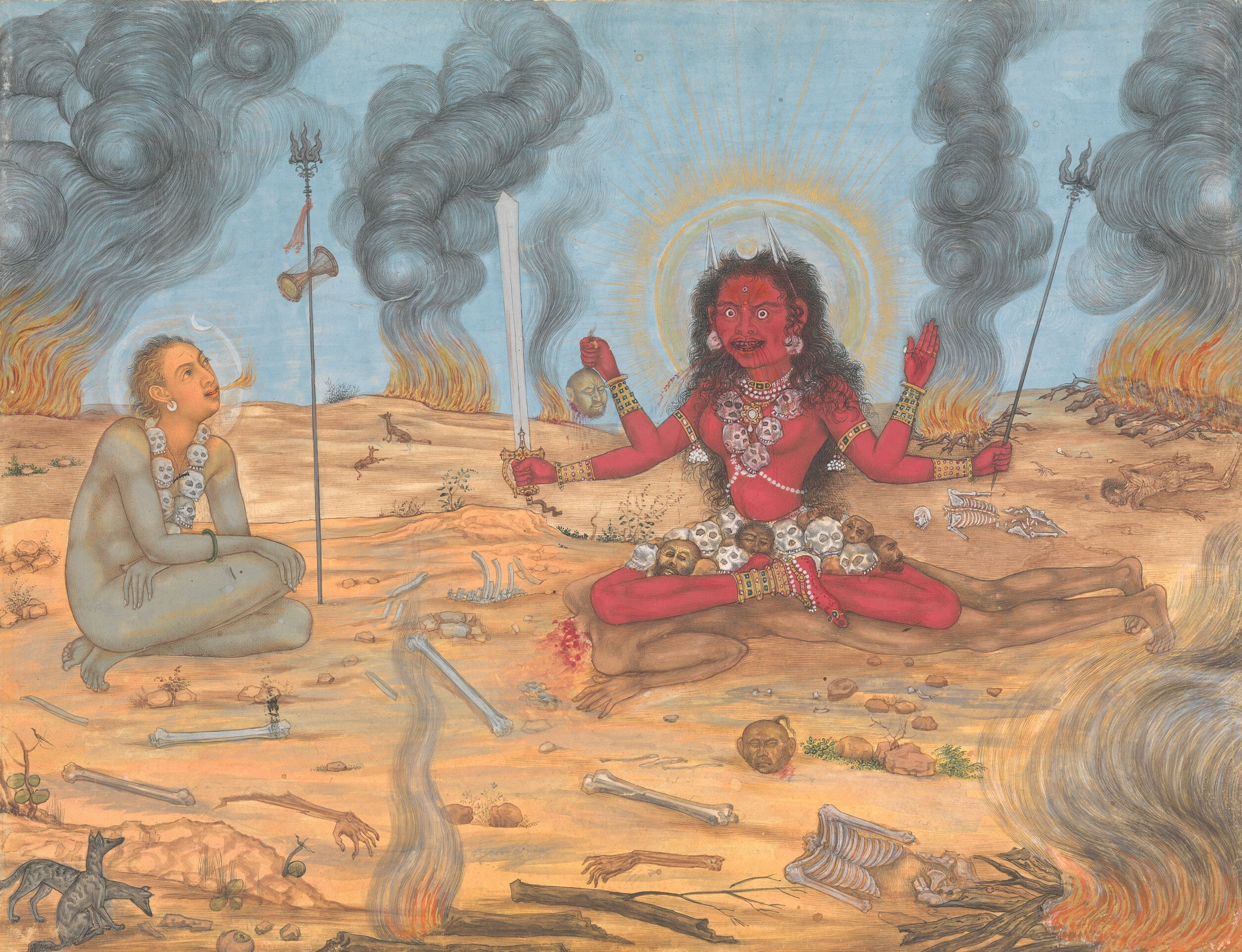
Tantric goddess Bhairavi and Shiva depicted as Kāpālika ascetics, sitting in a charnel ground. Painting by Payag from a 17th-century manuscript (c. 1630–1635), Metropolitan Museum of Art, New York City.

Aghoris also hold sacred the Hindu deity Dattatreya as a predecessor to the Aghori tradition. Dattatreya was believed to be an incarnation of Brahma, Vishnu, and Shiva united in the same singular physical body. Dattatreya is revered in all schools of Tantra, which is the philosophy followed by the Aghora tradition, and he is often depicted in Hindu artwork and its holy scriptures of folk narratives, the Puranas, indulging in Aghori "left-hand" Tantric worship as his prime practice. Aghoris are known for controversial rituals such as shava samskara or shava sadhana (a worship ritual in which a corpse is used as altar) to invoke the mother goddess in her form as Smashan Tara (Tara of the Cremation Grounds).

In Hindu iconography, Tara, like Kali, is one of the ten Mahavidyas (wisdom goddesses) and once invoked can bless the Aghori with supernatural powers. The most popular of the ten Mahavidyas who are worshiped by Aghoris are Dhumavati, Bagalamukhi, and Bhairavi. The male Hindu deities primarily worshiped by Aghoris for supernatural powers are manifestations of Shiva, including Mahākāla, Bhairava, Virabhadra, Avadhuta, and others.

Barrett (2008: p. 161) discusses the "charnel ground sādhanā" of the Aghora in both its left and right-handed proclivities and identifies it as principally cutting through attachments and aversion and foregrounding primordiality; a view uncultured, undomesticated:

The gurus and disciples of Aghor believe their state to be primordial and universal. They believe that all human beings are natural-born Aghori. Hari Baba has said on several occasions that human babies of all societies are without discrimination, that they will play as much in their own filth as with the toys around them. Children become progressively discriminating as they grow older and learn the culturally specific attachments and aversions of their parents. Children become increasingly aware of their mortality as they bump their heads and fall to the ground. They come to fear their mortality and then palliate this fear by finding ways to deny it altogether.

In this sense, the Aghora sādhanā is a process of unlearning deeply internalised cultural models. When this sādhanā takes the form of charnel ground sādhanā, the Aghori faces death as a very young child, simultaneously meditating on the totality of life at its two extremes. This ideal example serves as a prototype for other Aghor practices, both left and right, in ritual and in daily life."

Lord Aghora, an antinomian and annihilater form of Shiva closely associated with the cremation ground, who appeared to Baba Keenaram atop Girnar Mountain in Gujarat. Considered to be the adi guru (ancient spiritual teacher) and founding deity of Aghor, Lord Dattatreya offered his own flesh to the young ascetic as prasād (a kind of blessing), conferring upon him the power of clairvoyance and establishing a guru-disciple relationship between them.

== See also ==
- Aghora Yoga
- Baul
