= Spatika Lingam =

Type of Lingam made from quartz

Spatika Lingam or Crystal Lingam is a type of Lingam made from quartz. Spatika Lingam is called sphatika Sivalingam (Sanskrit: स्फटिक शिवलिंग), (Telugu-స్పటిక లింగం), (Tamil - ஸ்படிகக்கல் லிங்கம்), (Kannada -ಸ್ಪಟಿಕ ಲಿಂಗ). Sphatikam (Sanskrit: स्फटिक) in Sanskrit means "made of crystal, crystalline", referring to quartz and alum.

== Sphatika Lingam in scriptures ==
In Hindu Shiva temples, Saiva Agamas (Shaivism's Agamas) allows worshiping Shiva in the form of Sphatika Lingam or Crystal Lingam. The Saiva Agamas says "one can worship this Great God Shiva in the form of a Lingam made of mud or sand, of cow dung or wood, of bronze or black granite stone. But the purest and most sought-after form is the quartz crystal (Spatika), a natural stone not carved by man but made by nature, gathered molecule by molecule over hundreds, thousands or millions of years, grown as a living body grows, but infinitely more slowly. Such a creation of nature is itself a miracle worthy of worship."

=== Digambar Ashram Asni, Fatehpur, Uttar Pradesh, India ===
Digambar Ashram is located in Asni Village of Fatehpur district in Uttar Pradesh. There is a temple inside Digambar Ashram where a rhinestone Shivling is stated. The name of Shivling is "Swatmanandeshwar Mahadev ji". The Shivling weighs 15 kg it is 16 inches in diameter and is 10 inches tall.

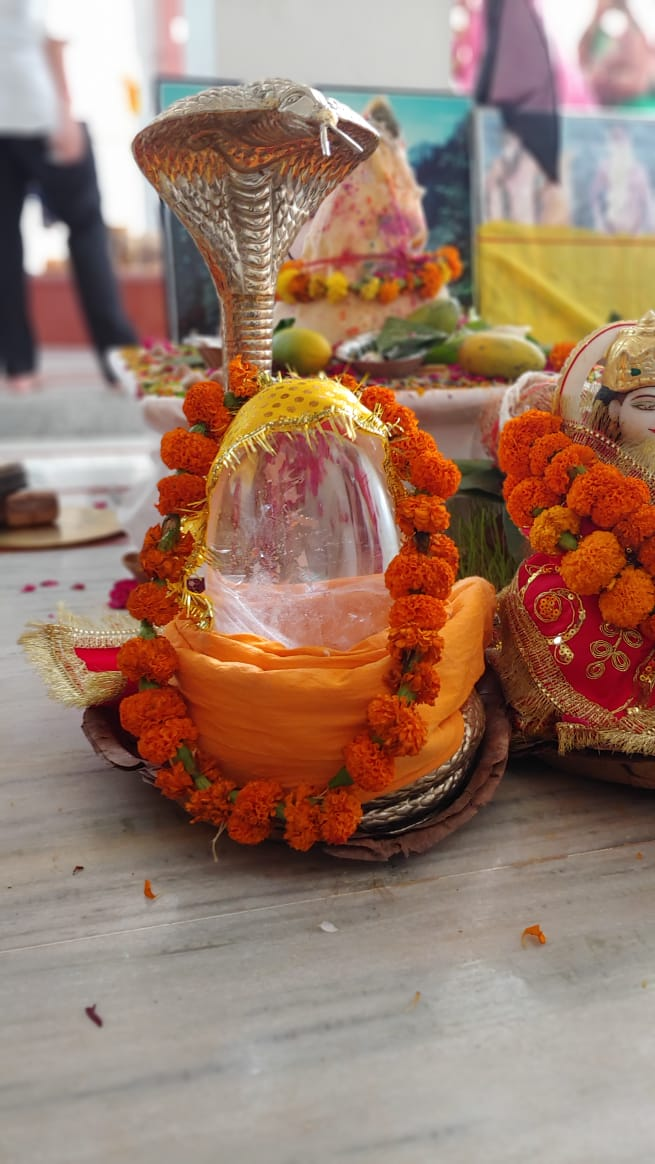
Swatmanandeshwar Ji

All Images Of Swatmanandeshwar Shivlingam

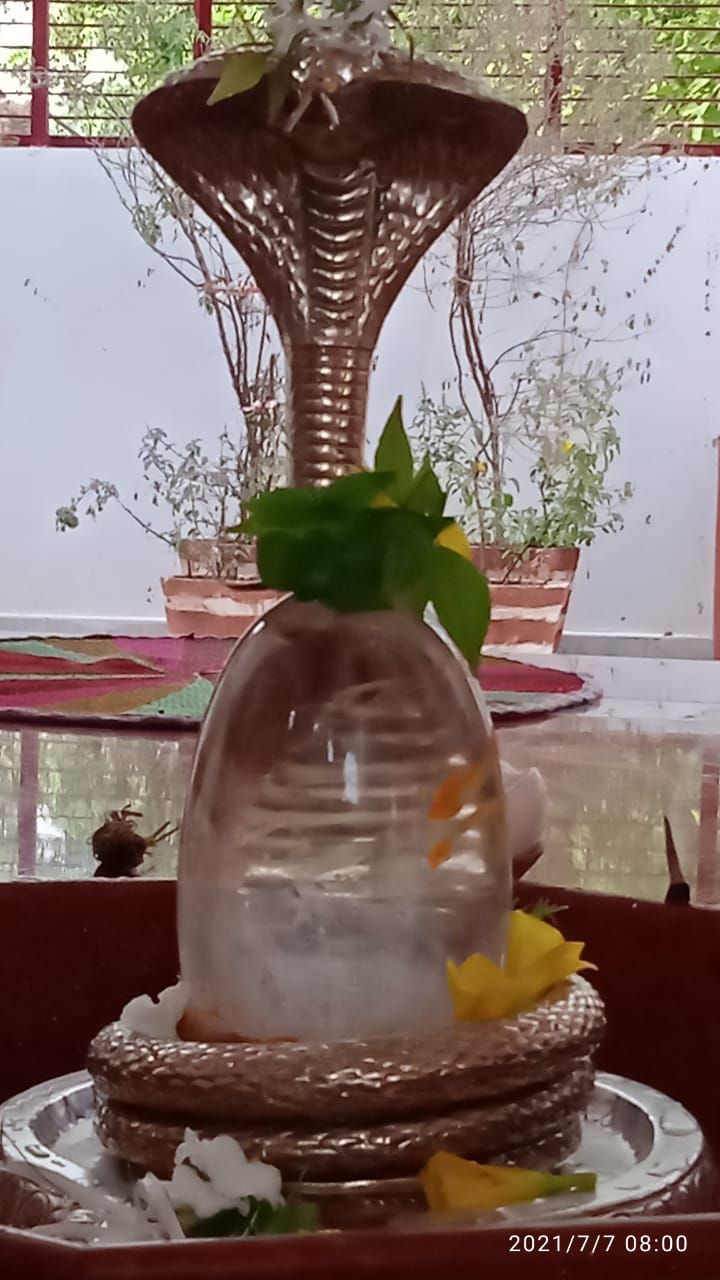
Shivlingam After Rudrabhishekh

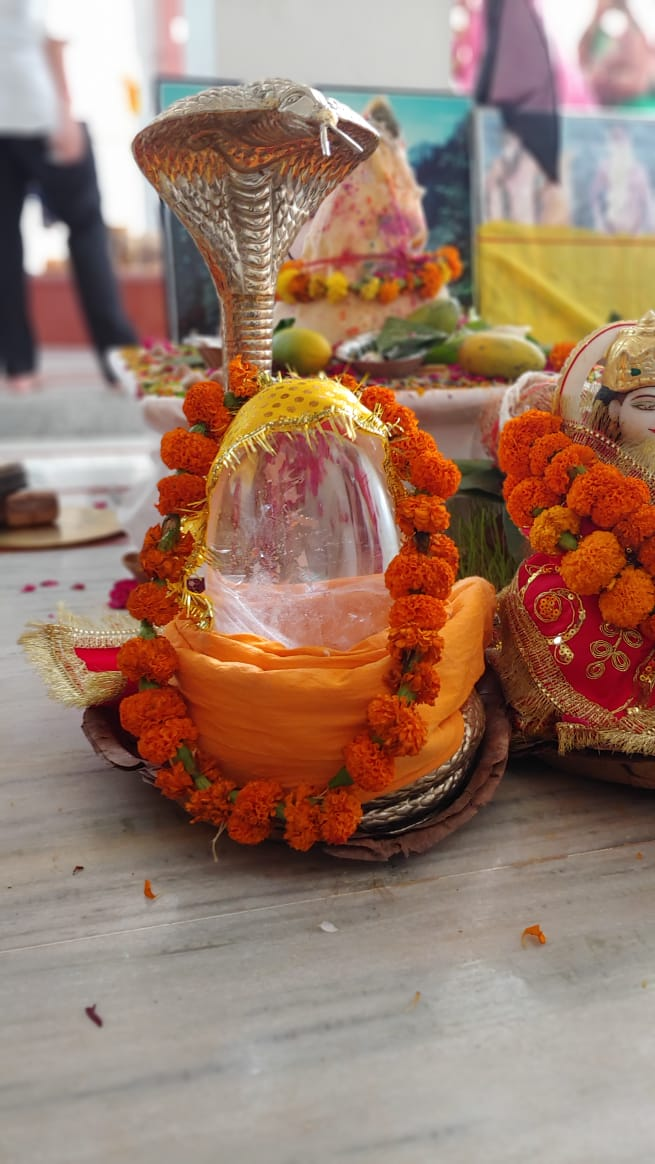
Swatmanandeshwar Ji

=== Thillai Nataraja swamy Temple, Chidambaram ===
Thillai Nataraja swamy Temple, Chidambaram is considered as one of the most ancient and most celebrated of Shiva temples in India.

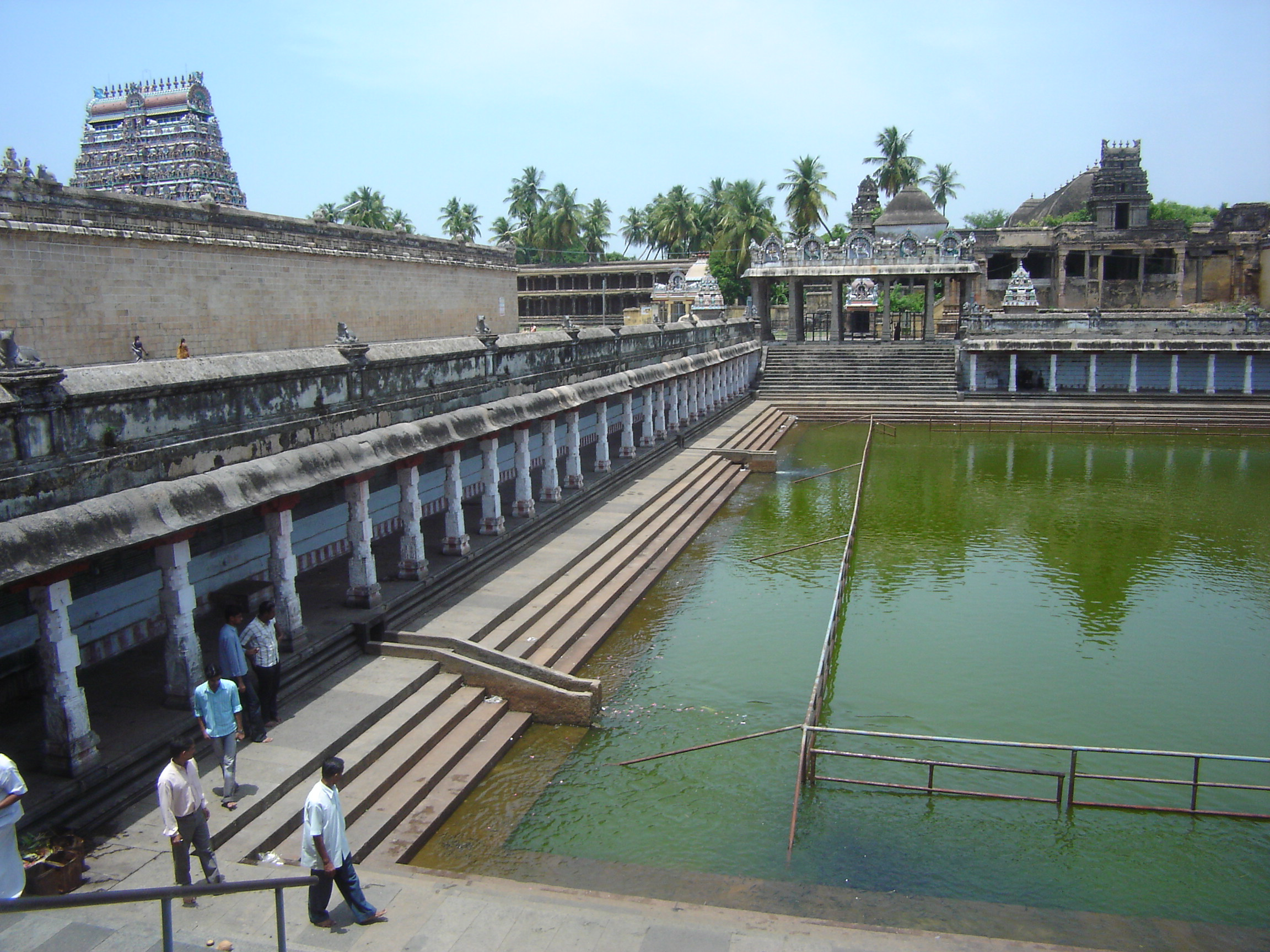
Chidambaram Temple

Saivites attach great religious as well as historic and cultural significance with this temple. In this temple Shiva is an embodiment of the infinite space. Nataraja Temple inChidambram is associated with Nataraja, or Shiva in his Ananda Tandava pose (the Cosmic Dance of bliss) in the cosmic golden hall (Ponnambalam) and the hall of consciousness (Chit Sabha).

=== Kadavul Temple, Kauai, Hawaii, USA ===
Kadavul HinduTemple is a traditional Chola style temple dedicated to Shiva and was established in 1973 in Kauai, Hawaii, USA.

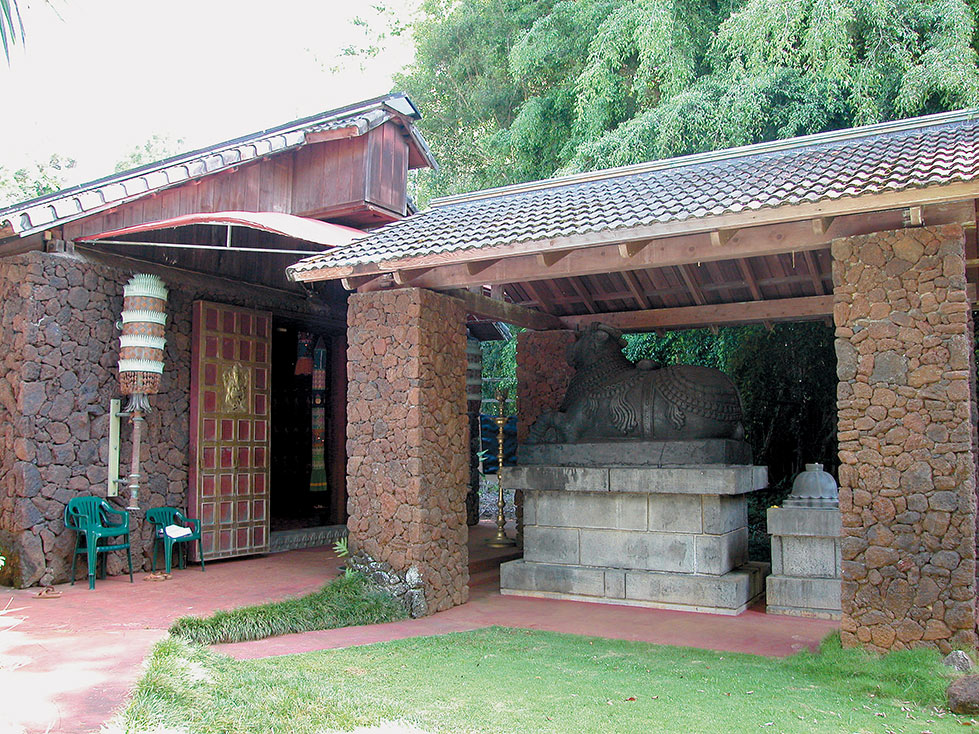
Kadavul temple outside

Shiva is enshrined in the main sanctum in the form of Nataraja and a crystal Sivalingam. In front of Shiva's sanctum is a 300-kg, 3-foot-tall, naturally formed sphatika Sivalingam, believed to be the largest six-sided, single-pointed crystal ever found.. This Shiva Lingam is being temporarily installed in Kadavul HinduTemple, where a ruby-red, low-power laser beam illumines it. In future this Saptika lingam would be housed in the hand-carved white granite Iraivan Temple. There is a black 16 Ton Nandi (bull) carved from a single stone in front of pavilion standing on redwood timber pavilion. Six-foot-tall black granite Murti of Ganesha and Kartikeya are installed in two side shrines. Moreover, lining the main walls of the temple is a rare collection of Shiva's 108 tandava dance poses in 16-inch-tall bronze icons covered with gold leaf. The shrine for the temple's founder, Satguru Sivaya Subramuniyaswami was established to the right of the entry door. A small temple tank has a bronze statue of dancing Saint Sambandar.

=== Meenakshi Amman Temple, Madurai ===
Meenakshi Amman Temple is a historic Hindu temple located in the south side of river Vaigai in the temple city of Madurai, Tamil Nadu, India. It is dedicated to Parvati who is known as Meenakshi (one with fish-like eyes) and her consort, Shiva named here as Sundareswarar (beautiful deity). The temple forms the heart and lifeline of the 2500-year-old city of Madurai.

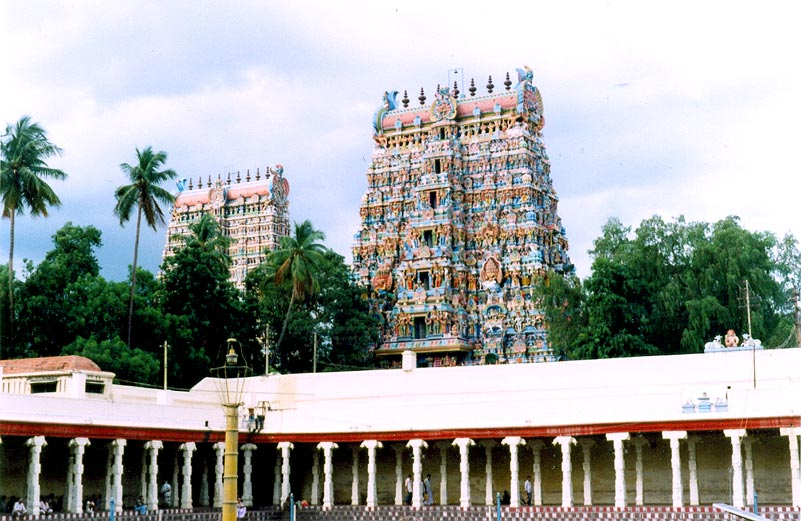
Madurai Meenakshi Temple

The centuries-old Spatika Lingam held in this temple has developed cracks and hence a new six inch tall Spatika Lingam with the right specification has been brought from Himalayas. It is learned that this Lingam is worth over Rs.7.5 lakh. The new Sphatika Lingam will be the companion (Udaiyavar) to Sundareswarar. The existing brass container of the Lingam will be replaced with golden container. The new silver consecration base (abhisheka peedam) weighing about 12 kg. is also getting ready for the formal consecration. The new Sphatika Lingam is getting consecrated on March 16, 2012.

=== Ramanathaswamy Temple, Rameshwaram ===
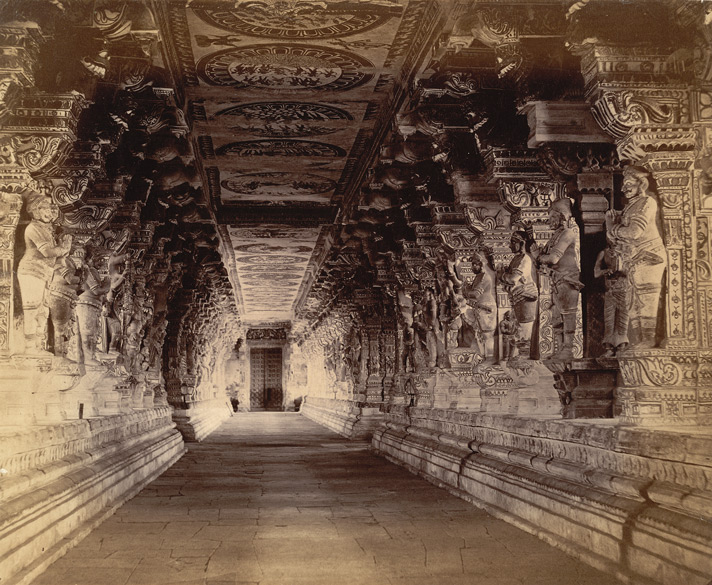
Rameshwaram Ramanathaswamy Temple Corridor

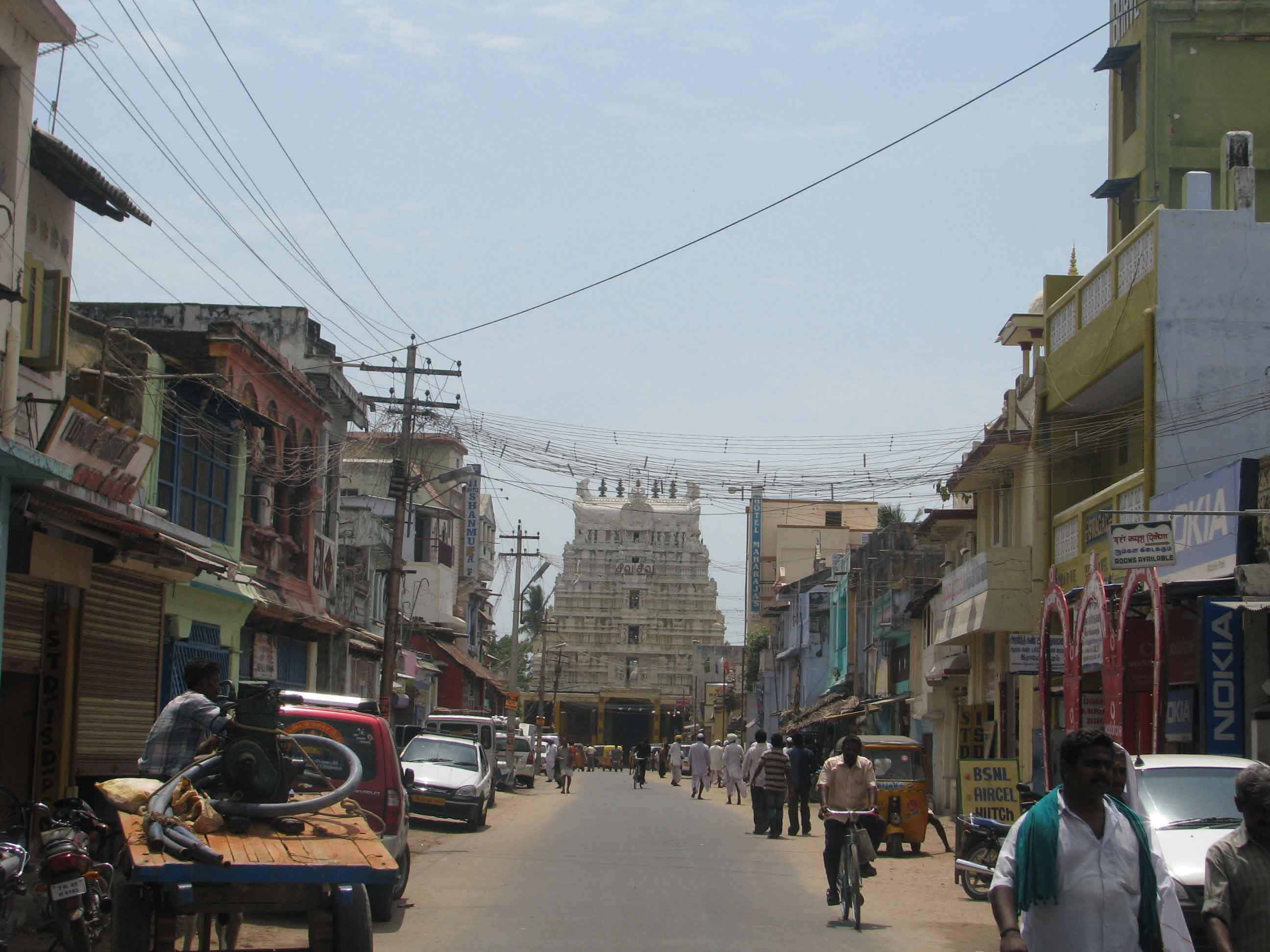
Ramanathaswamy Temple Gopuram

Ramanathaswamy Temple is a famous Hindu temple dedicated to Shiva located in the island of Rameswaram in the state of Tamil Nadu, India. The Temple is also one of the 12 Jyothirlinga temples, where Shiva is worshipped in the form of a Jyotirlingam meaning "pillar of light". The temple is located in Rameshwaram, an island town in South India, considered a holy pilgrimage site for both Shaivites and Vaishnavites. Ramanathaswamy temple was built during the 12th century and widely expanded during the Nayak period in the late 16th century. Ramanathaswamy temple is known for its longest corridor among all Hindu temples in India.

In the first inner corridor, devotees pray to the venerated white Spatika Lingam. The Sri Chakra (Sethu Peetam) and the Sphatika Lingam were instituted by Adi Sankara. Sphatika lingam darshan is available the pilgrims during early morning hours The new Spatika lingam was consecrated by Jagadguru Shankaracharya Sri Sri Bharati Tirtha Mahaswami, the 36th Shankaracharya of Dakṣināmnāya Sringeri Sharada Peetham in February 2021.

=== Ekambaranathar Temple, Kanchipuram ===
Ekambaranathar Temple is a Saivite Hindu temple dedicated to Shiva. It is located in Kanchipuram in the state of Tamil Nadu, India. Ekambaranathar Temple is the largest temple and is located in the northern part of the temple town Kanchipuram.

The ursava deity Ekambareswarar is seated in a glass sanctum sactorum with a roof decorated with rudraksha beads. Just in front of this shrine, there is another one with Sphatika Lingam along with the vehicle Nandi. Offering prayer to this Spatika Lingam is said to bring better appearance, confidence and fair thinking.

This temple has one rare Spatika Lingam. Special worship services are offered to Nataraja and the associated Spatika Lingam, as in Chidambaram.

Shiva has agreed to perform consecration to Vishnu. Therefore, consecration is performed to the Sphatika Lingam present inside the sanctum sanctorum. One view is that the Sphatika Laingam was instituted by Adi Sankara and yet another view states that the Sphatika Lingam was established by Sri Narasimha Bharathi Swamy of Shringeri Mutt.

=== Shri Prakasheshwar Mahadev Mandir ===
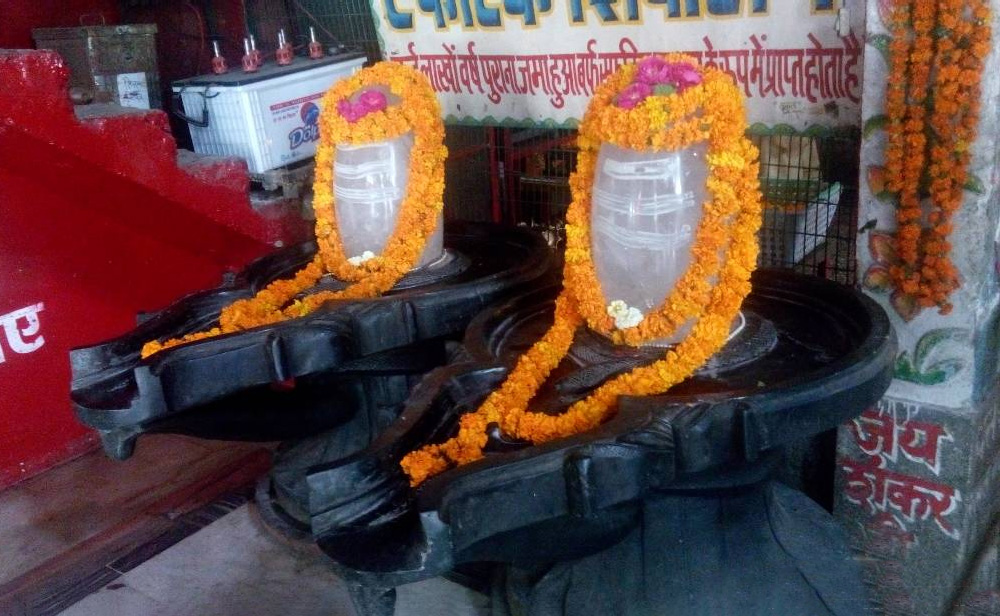
Two Spatika Lingam at Shri Prakasheshwar Mahadev Mandir

Shri Prakasheshwar Mahadev Mandir is situated in the Dehradun district, Uttarakhand, India. It has twin Spatika Lingams.
