= Iraivan Temple =

- San Marga Iraivan Temple
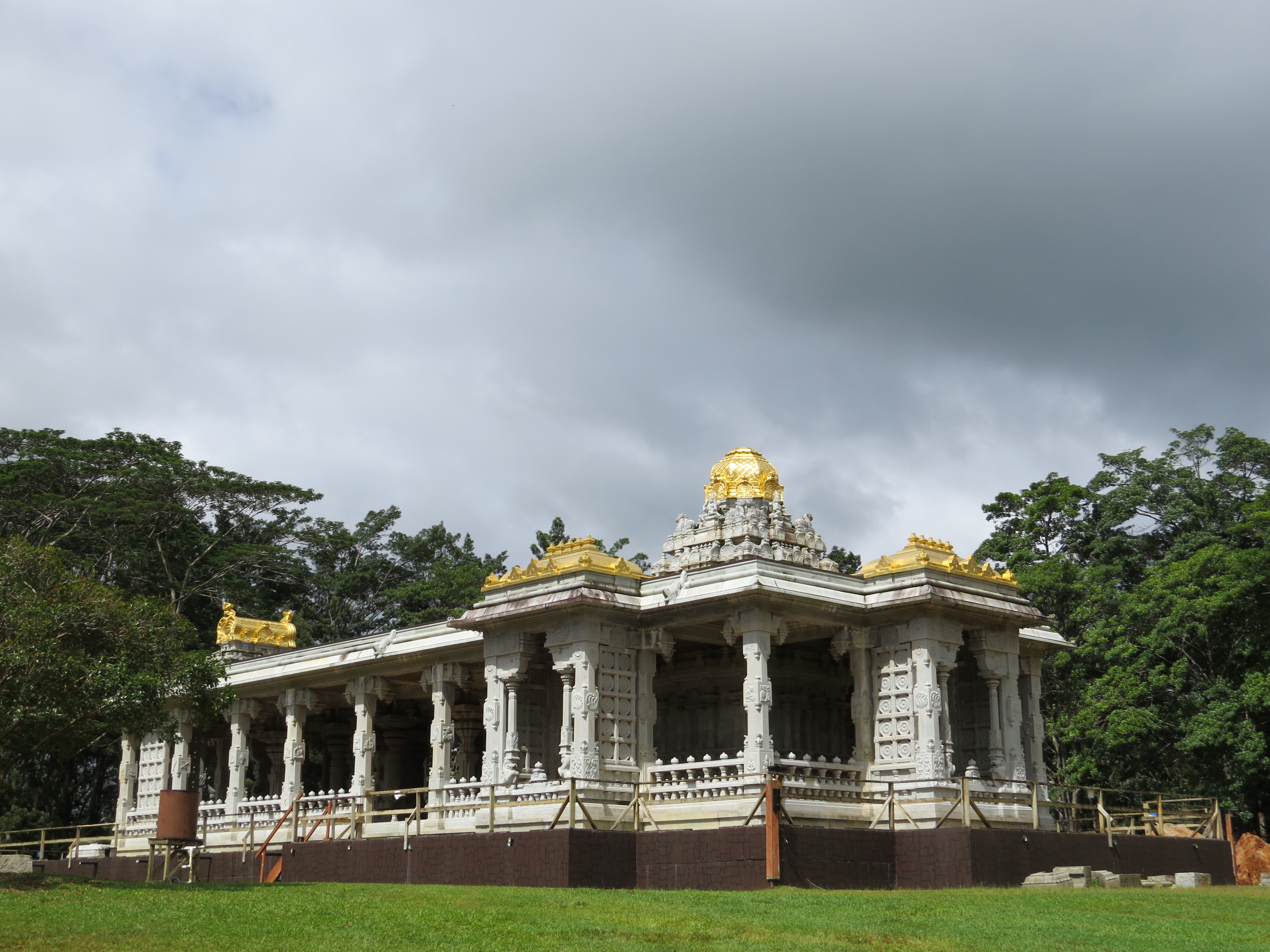
- Iraivan Temple

- Location within North Pacific Location within Hawaii

Religion
- Affiliation: Hinduism
- Deity: Lord Shiva

Location
- Location: Kapaʻa
- State: Hawaii
- Country: United States
- Coordinates: 22.059361°N 159.396946°W

Architecture
- Type: Chola-style Temple
- Creator: Kauaʻi Hindu Monastery and architect V. Ganapati Sthapati
- Established: 1990 construction started

Website
- www.himalayanacademy.com

The San Marga Iraivan Temple is a Hindu temple dedicated to Shiva located on Kauaʻi, an island in the state of Hawaii. "Iraivan" means "One Above All," and is one of the oldest words for God in the Tamil language. It is the first all-stone, white granite temple to be built in the western hemisphere whose construction began in 1990. The Iraivan Temple is located next to the Wailua River and 8 km from Mount Waialeale. It is maintained by the Saiva Siddhanta temple which is also known as Kauaʻi Aadheenam and Kauaʻi's Hindu Monastery. The main murti, or worshipful icon, is a rare spathika Sivalinga, a pointed, six-faced 700-pound clear quartz crystal.

Sri Trichy Mahaswamigal (d. 2005) of Kailash Ashram, Bangalore, describes the temple's importance: "The Iraivan Temple is going to be to America what the temples of Chidambaram, Madurai, Rameshwaram, and other great Siva temples are to India."

== History ==
The Iraivan Temple was envisioned by the founder Satguru Sivaya Subramuniyaswami, on February 15, 1975. He required that the temple be made without the use of machinery.

In 1990, two swamis, Sri Sivaratnapuri Mahaswamigal and Sri Balagangadharanatha provided eleven acres of land outside Bangalore, India. The land served as a carving ground for 75 stone-carvers who hand-carved more than 4,000 blocks of granite to be transported to the temple site at Kauaʻi. Beginning in 2001, the stone were shipped to Kauaʻi and assembly begun by a team of silpi temple carvers under the direction of a master architect or sthapati.

The current head of the project is Satguru Bodhinatha Veylanswami, successor to the founder.

It was completed and consecrated in 2023 after a 33-year construction period.

The temple was constructed using approximately 3.2 million pounds of granite imported from India and built according to traditional methods, without the use of modern tools or electricity.

Following the August 2023 wildfires in Maui, members of the monastery facilitated connections between Hindu donors and local organizations involved in recovery efforts.

== Architecture ==
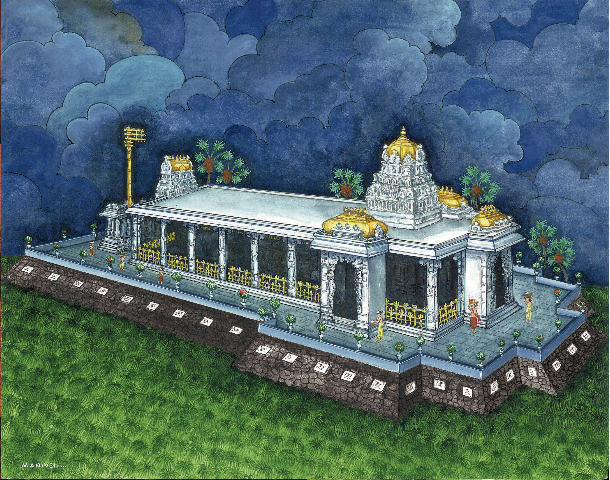
Artist's conception of Iraivan Temple

The temple faces south and is a Chola architectural style temple and designed according to the Vastu and Agamas scriptures by V. Ganapati Sthapati. It is made entirely from granite and possesses a number of rare architectural features. At the entrance of the temple, there is a 32 diameter bell and chain carved from one entire stone that hangs from the ceiling. The pillars of temple include unique features, such as eight lion-shaped pillars with a rotatable stone ball in each of their mouths and two pillars with 16 carved rods that produce musical tones when struck with a mallet.

The temple is carved entirely by hand by craftsmen who follow and preserve traditional methods, shaping the stone with small hammers and utilizing over 70 types of chisels. The 4-foot-thick (1.2 m) foundation is made of a crack-free, 7,000-psi formula using fly ash, a by-product of coal burning.

Vastu architecture aims at creating a space that will elevate the vibration of the individual to resonate with the vibration of the built space, which in turn is in tune with universal space. The whole space of the temple is defined in multiples and fractions of one unit, 11 feet (3.4 m) and 7^{1/4} inches. Pillars through the temple are spaced and structured to serve as energy points for the building. Iraivan Temple will be completely free of electricity for mystical reasons, as decreed by Satguru Sivaya Subramuniyaswami.

== Deities ==
The inner sanctum of the temple houses the murti (sacred image) of Shiva in the form of a rare Spatika Lingam, a pointed, six-faced 700-pound clear quartz crystal. In the early 1980s, Subramuniyaswami had been seeing the crystal in his dreams. He found it in 1987 and brought it to Kauaʻi. The stone, estimated to be 50 million years old, was not cut out of rock by a miner. Instead, it was found in a perfect state encased in mud, probably harvested from its original outcropping by an earthquake.The Spatika Lingam is considered especially sacred because it represents the element of akasha. The campus also hosts and maintains the Kadavul temple in which Shiva in the form of Nataraja is the primary deity.

== See also ==
- Kadavul temple
- Saiva Siddhanta Church
- Sivaya Subramuniyaswami
- Bodhinatha Veylanswami
