= Saiva Siddhanta Church =

Hindu organization headquartered in Hawaii, U.S.

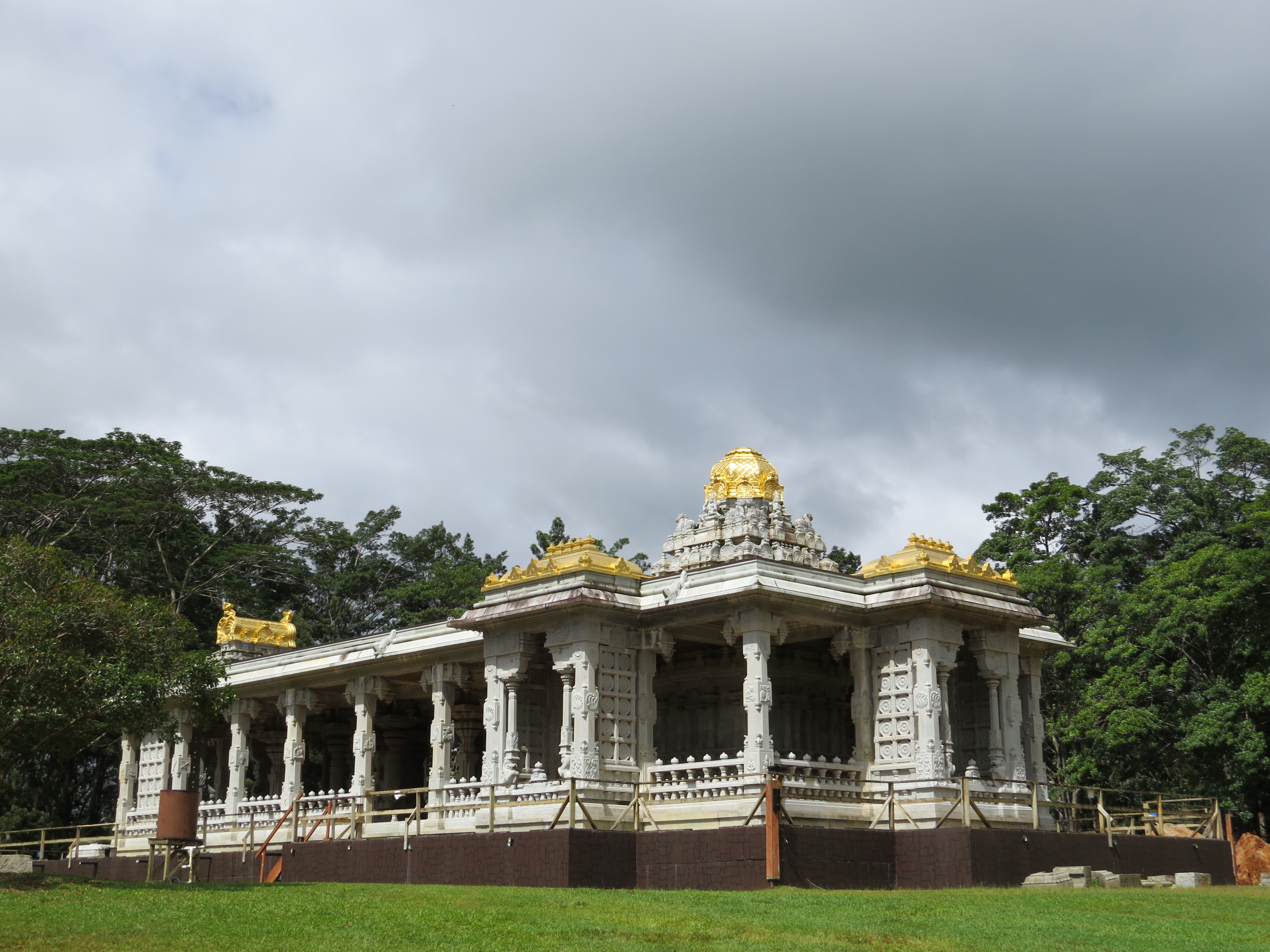
- Iraivan Temple at Kauaʻi's Hindu Monastery
- Formation: 1949 (In United States)
- Founder: Satguru Sivaya Subramuniyaswami
- Type: 501(c)(3)
- Headquarters: Hawaii, United States
- Official language: English
- Current head: Satguru Bodhinatha Veylanswami
- Staff: Approx. 20 monks, plus volunteers
- Website: Śaiva Siddhanta Church

Saiva Siddhanta Church is an organization that identifies itself with the Saivite Hindu religion. It supports the work of the late Satguru Sivaya Subramuniyaswami, a spiritual teacher initiated by Siva Yogaswami of Jaffna with the honorary title Gurudeva. The mission of the temple is to preserve and promote the Saivite Hindu religion. Membership in the temple extends to many countries in the world, including the United States, Canada, Mauritius, Malaysia, Singapore, India, Sri Lanka and several European nations. Members are organized into regional missions with the goal of supporting Shaivism in their families, communities, and in the global community under the leadership of Satguru Bodhinatha Veylanswami.

== History ==
The Church was founded in 1949 by Satguru Sivaya Subramuniyaswami, a Saiva Hindu Guru initiated by his guru, Siva Yogaswami of Jaffna. The name of the Church is from the Tamil language and could be roughly rendered in English as "The Church of God Śiva's Revealed Truth." The Saiva Siddhanta Church was incorporated under the laws of the United States of America in the State of California on December 30, 1957, and received recognition of its US Internal Revenue tax exempt status as a temple on February 12, 1962. Among America's oldest Hindu institutions, it established its international headquarters at Kauai Aadheenam, also known as Kauai's Hindu Monastery, in Kauai, Hawaii, on February 5, 1970. Kauai's Hindu Monastery has two temples, Iraivan Temple and Kadavul Temple.

== Purpose ==
Saiva Siddhanta Church supports all major projects supervised by Satguru Bodhinatha Veylanswami, including:

- Construction of the Iraivan Temple on Kauai, a white granite stone Siva temple sculpted in India.
- Publication of the magazine Hinduism Today. The magazine is widely read among Hindus in India and in the worldwide diaspora. Thus, it provides an important means for worldwide networking, which is widely acknowledged.
- Publication and distribution of books, booklets, and online material aimed at educating Hindus and non-Hindus about the Saivite Hindu religion.
- Teaching through lessons, literature, study courses, travel-study programs and youth retreats those actively pursuing the spiritual path under his guidance.
- Establishment and administration of charity organizations for Hindus worldwide, under the umbrella of Hindu Heritage Endowment.

== Theology ==
Saiva Siddhanta Church belongs to a monistic branch of the school of Saiva Siddhanta. Its theology is grounded in the Vedas, Saiva Agamas and the ancient Tirumantiram, a Tamil scripture composed by Tirumular. The church's theology is based on a synthesis of devotional theism and uncompromising nondualism. It is referred to as "monistic theism", which recognizes that monism and dualism/pluralism are equally valid perspectives. God is both within us and outside of us, the Creator and the creation, immanent and transcendent. Satguru Sivaya Subramuniyaswami explains:

The primary goal of monistic Saivism is realizing one's identity with God Siva, in perfect union and nondifferentiation. This is termed nirvikalpa samadhi, Self Realization, and may be attained in this life, granting moksha, permanent liberation from the cycles of birth and death. A secondary goal is savikalpa samadhi, the realization of Satchidananda, a unitive experience within superconsciousness in which perfect Truth, knowledge and bliss are known. Deep within our soul we are identical with God this very moment, for within us are the unmanifest Parasiva and the manifest Satchidananda. These are not aspects of the evolving soul, but the nucleus of the soul, which does not change or evolve. They are eternally perfect and one with God Siva. We are That. We do not become That.

== Church ==
The decision to create the organization as a church in U.S. law was explained thoroughly by the monks in the July 2006 edition of Hinduism Today Magazine:

"When they hear the word church, many people do not realize that under American law and tax codes the term includes the institutions of all types of religious faiths, not just Christian. In fact, the designation of a Hindu temple as a 'church' declares the truth of our existence as religious institutions on equal par with all others. We enthusiastically acknowledge our status as members of the rich diversity of the American religious life. ... The language made it easier for the local people, mostly church-going Christians, to understand the significance of the temple for the Hindus. After incorporating, most temples in America obtain tax exempt status as a '501(c)(3) organization' ... To be considered a church, the organization must have characteristics such as 'recognized creed and form of worship, & distinct religious history; ordained ministers selected after completing prescribed courses of study; literature of its own; [and] established places of worship' Although the Sanatana Dharma does not track these features as closely as some other religious traditions, it is well within the definition, and Hindu places of worship easily qualify as churches."

== Kauai's Hindu Monastery ==
Kauai's Hindu Monastery is situated in Kauai, Hawaii and is home to two temples: Kadavul Temple and Iraivan Temple. The Kadavul Temple was established in 1973 by Sivaya Subramuniyaswami. The construction of Iraivan Temple began in 1990. It is the first all-stone, white granite temple to be built in the western hemisphere.

== In the press ==
Referring to the Iraivan Temple, New York Times reporter Michelle Kayal wrote:

This looks like India, but it is the Hawaiian island of Kauai, where members of the Saiva Siddhanta Church are erecting a white granite temple to the Hindu God Siva that fulfills the vision of their guru and is intended to last 1,000 years. For this act of devotion, every single piece of stone—3.2 million pounds in all—is being pulled from the earth by hand in India and carved into intricately detailed blocks using nothing but hammer and iron chisel.

== Gallery ==
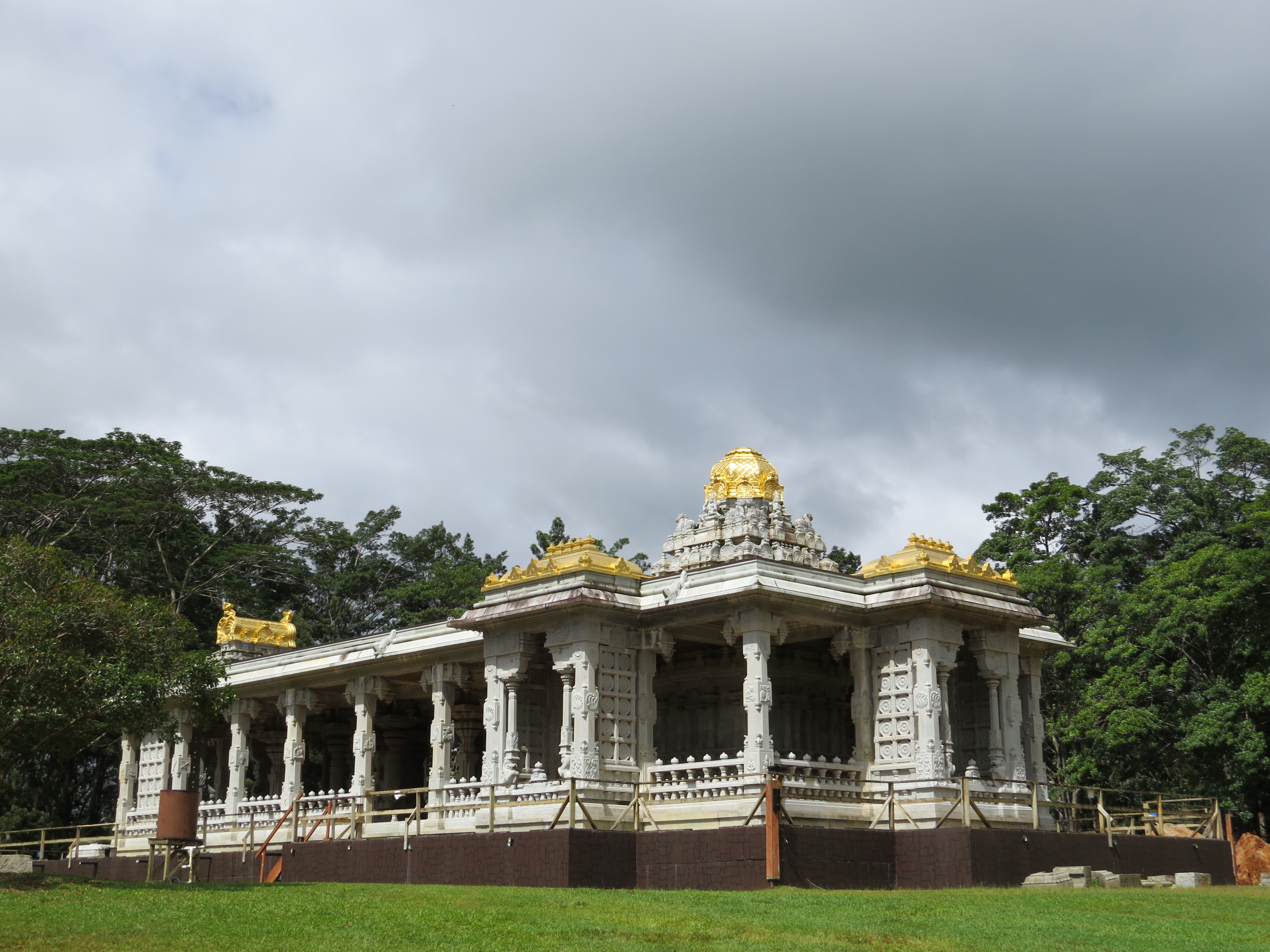
Iraivan Temple

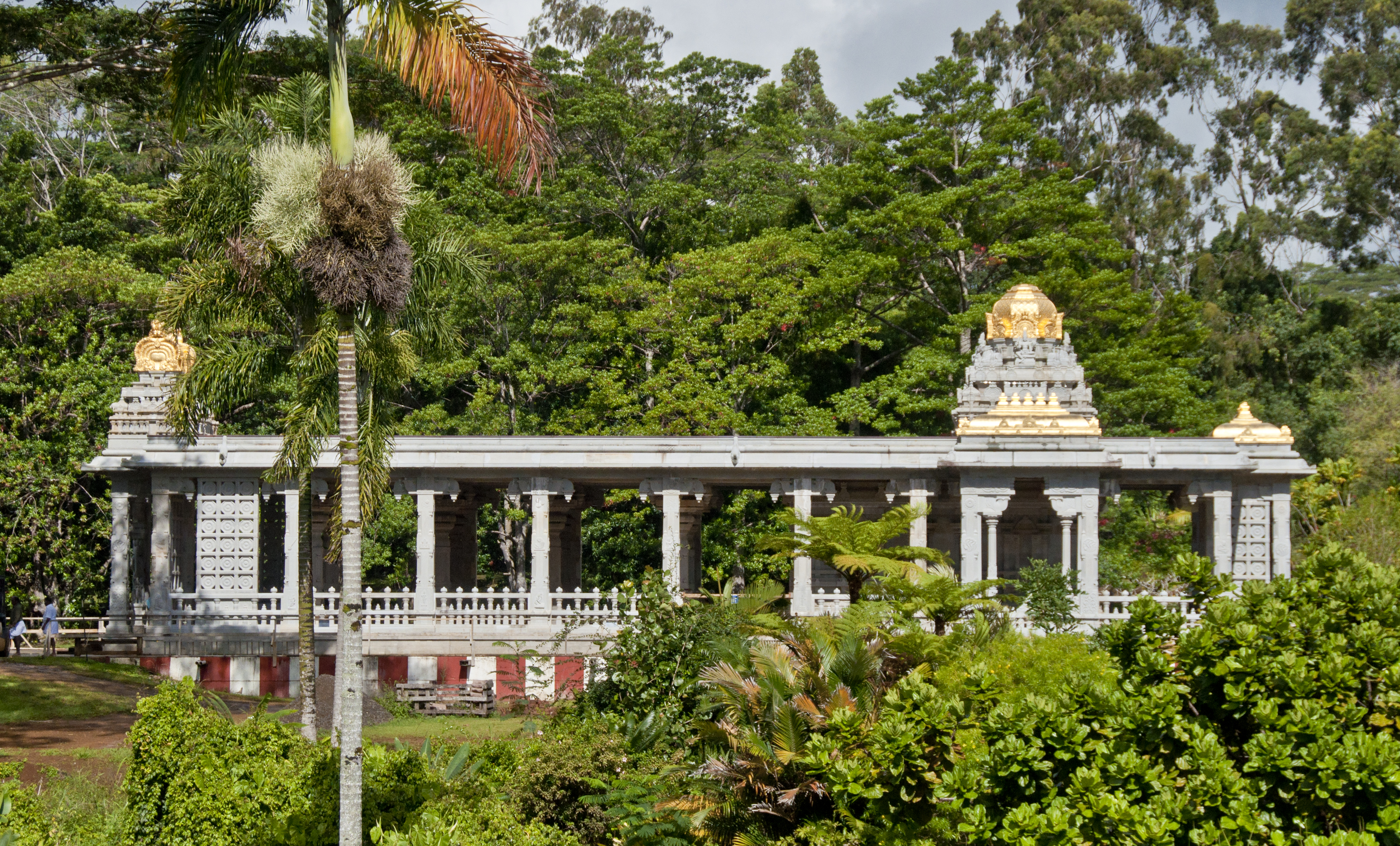
Iraivan Temple

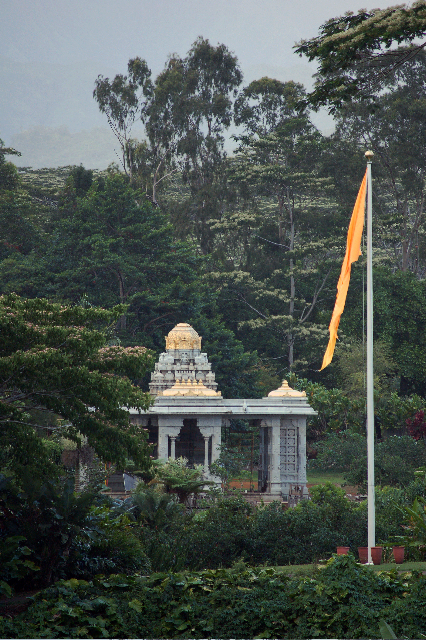
Iraivan Temple view from afar with flag

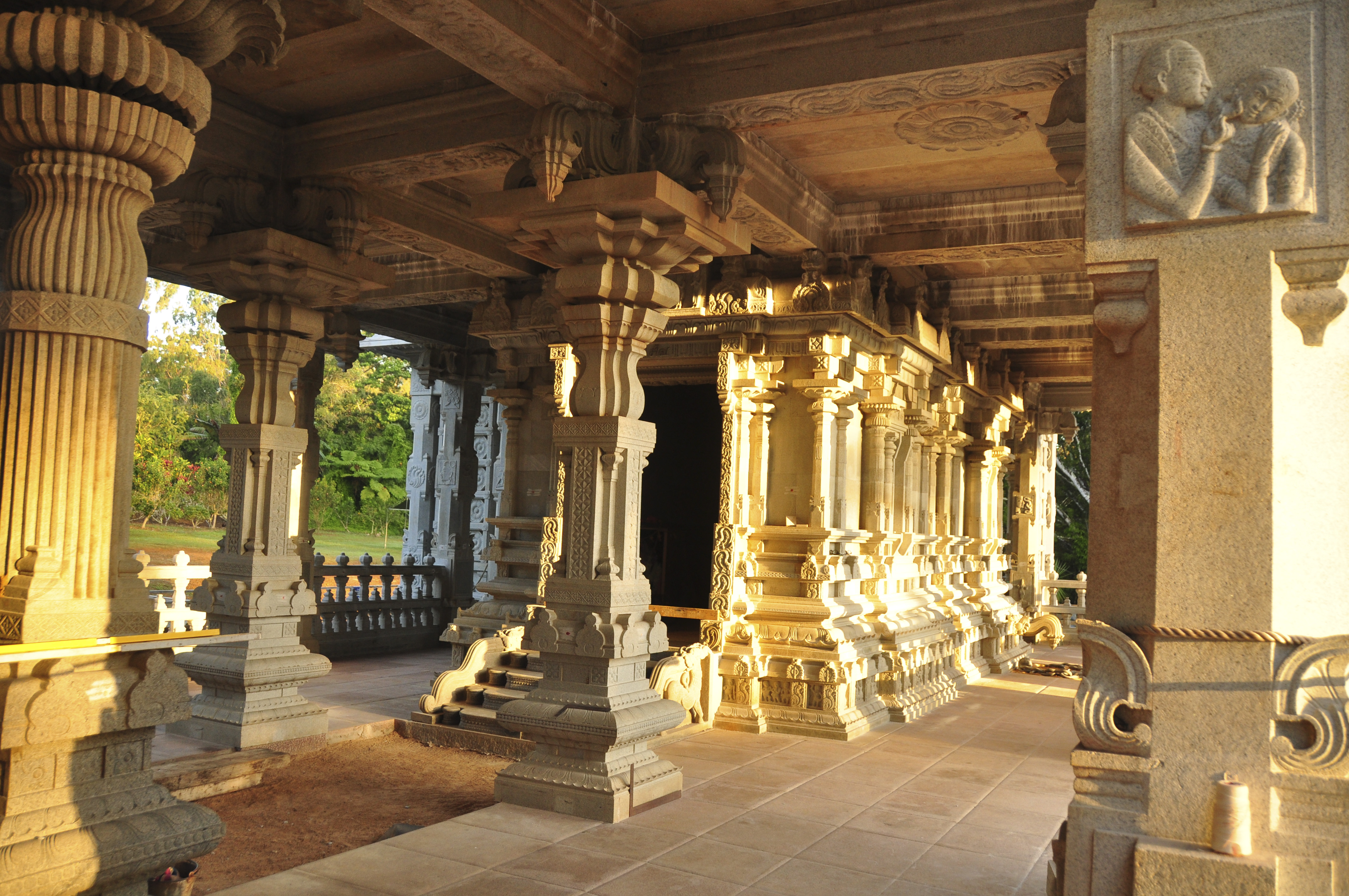
Interior of Iraivan Temple

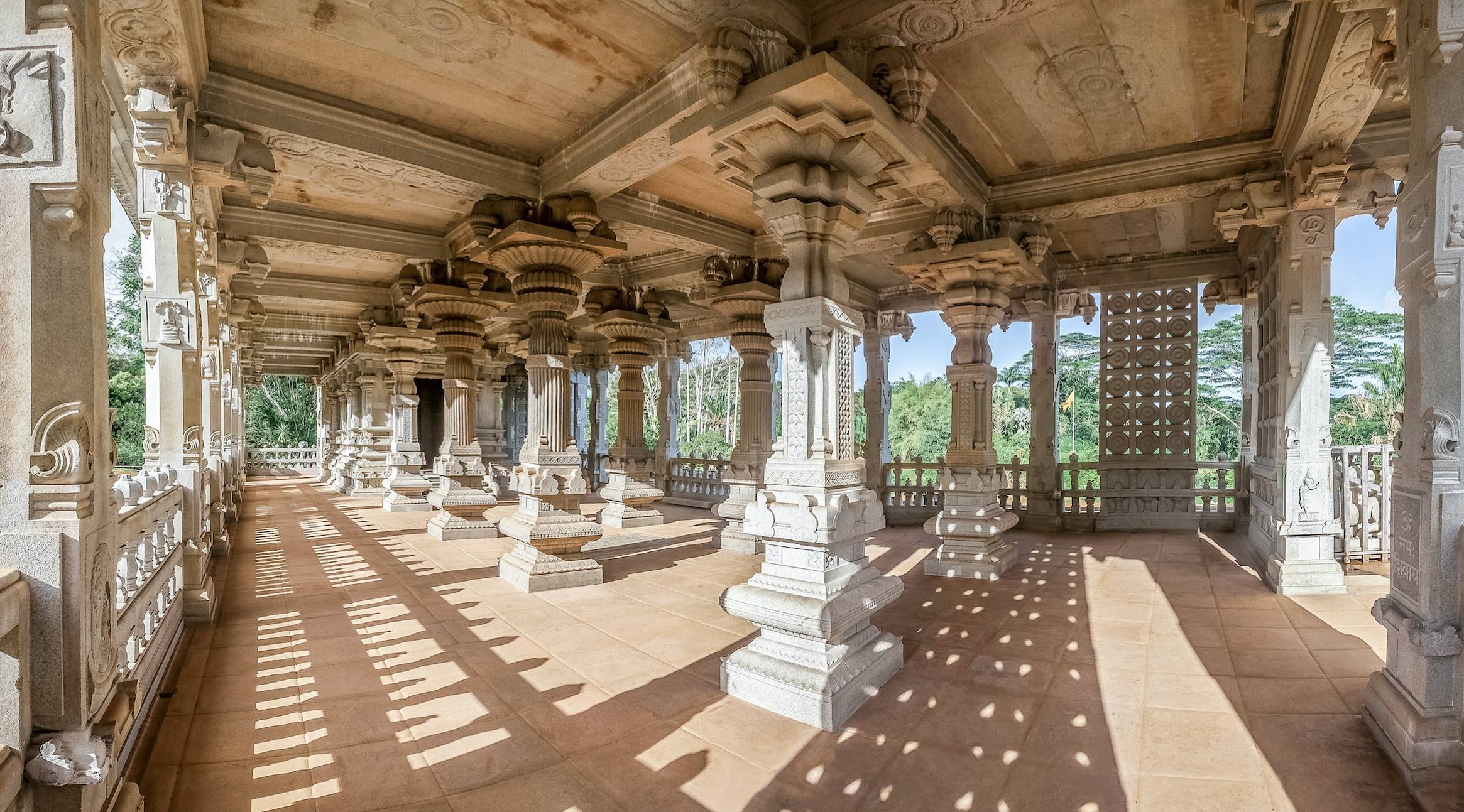
Inside Iraivan Temple

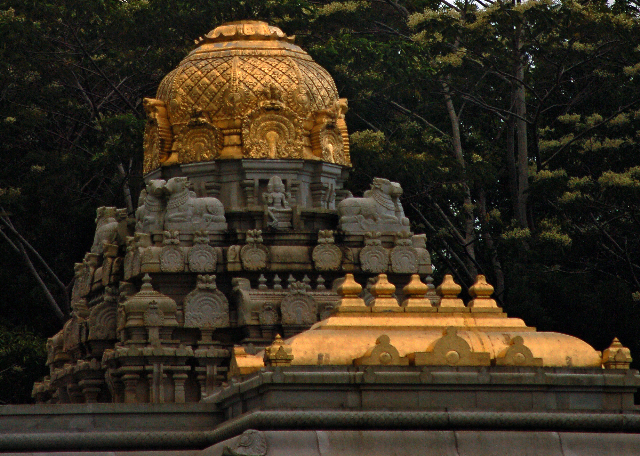
Vimana over the garbhagriha or inner sanctum of Iraivan Temple

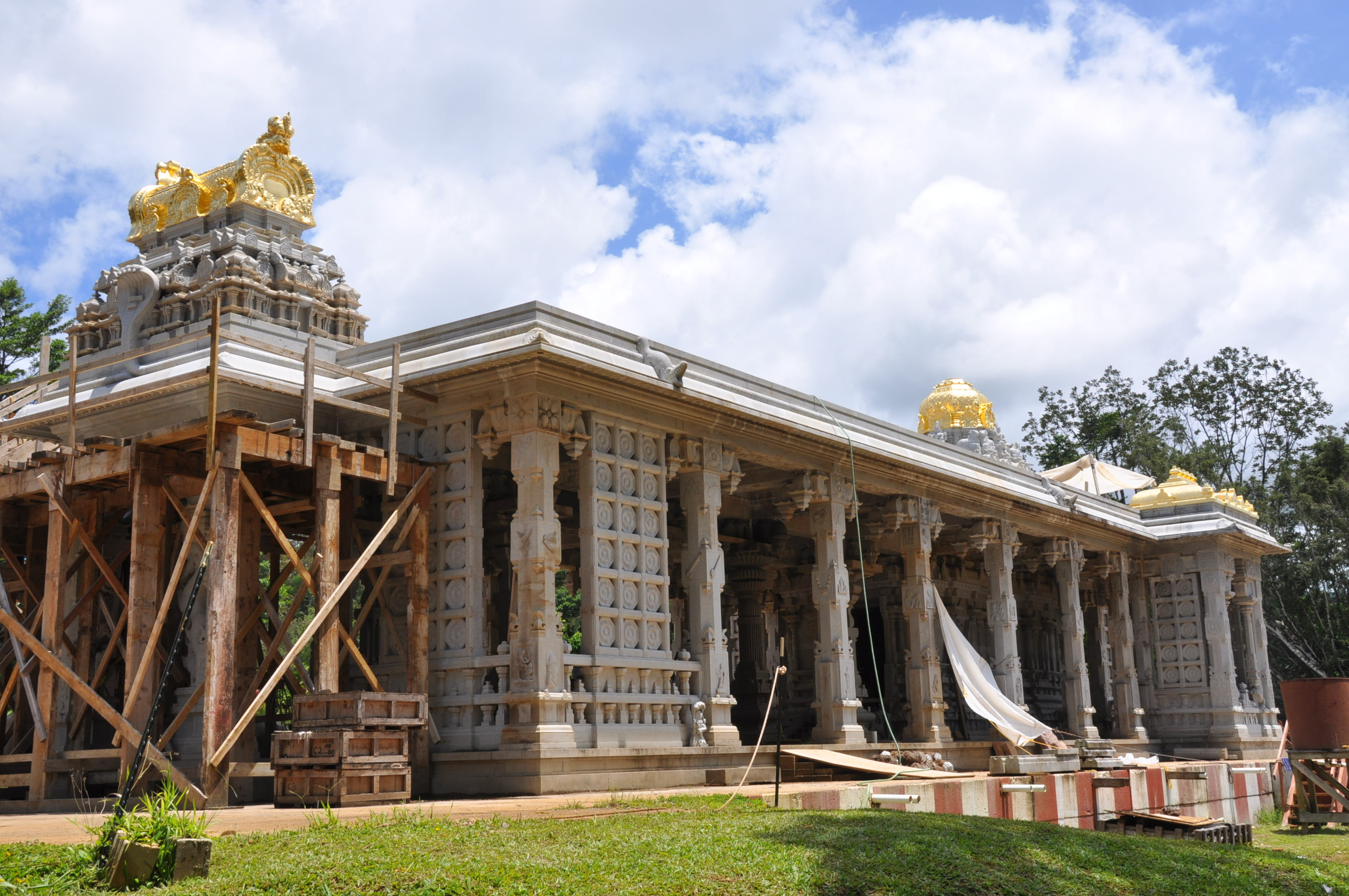
Iraivan Temple under construction

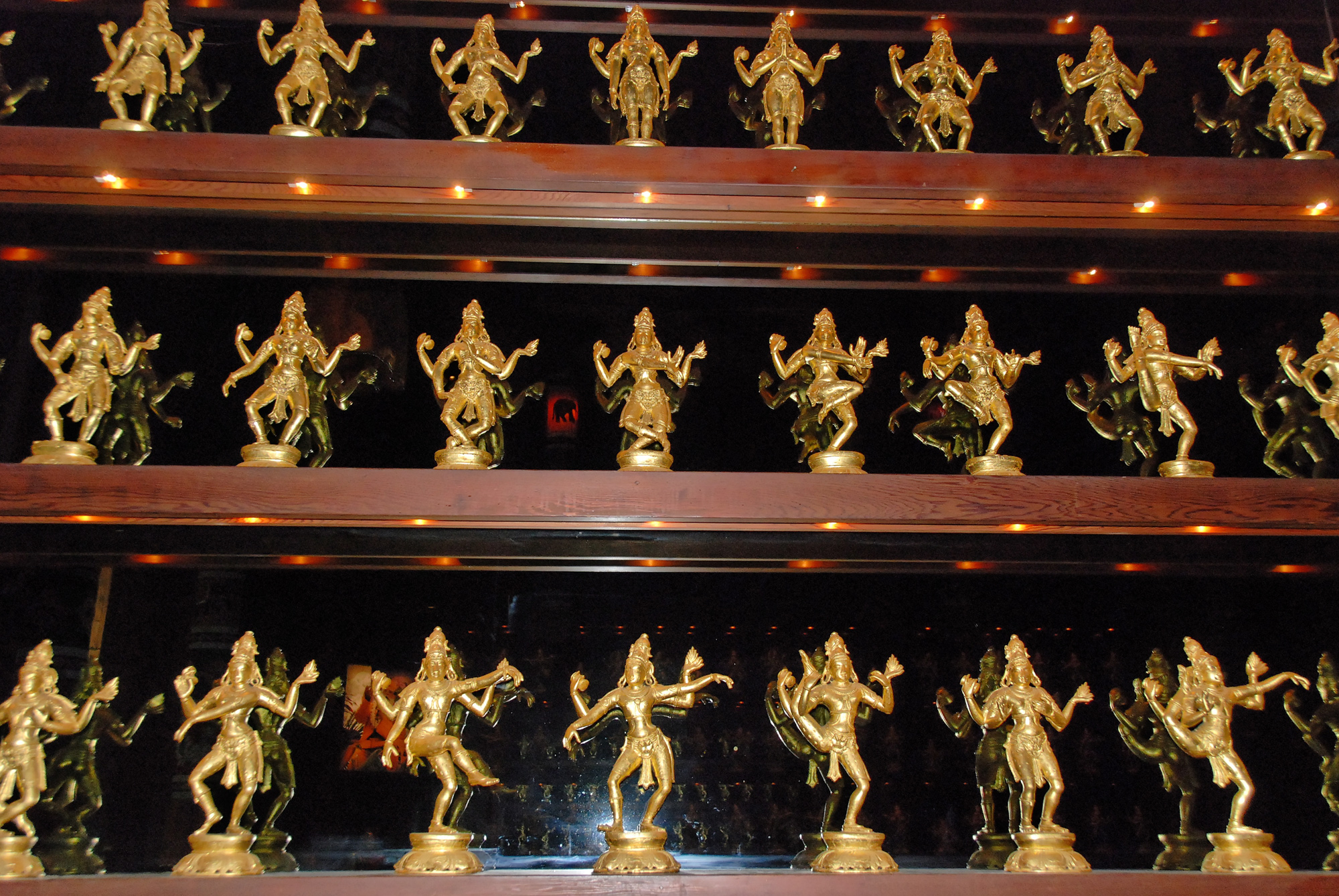
Inside wall of Kadavul temple
