= Sarvamnaya tantra =

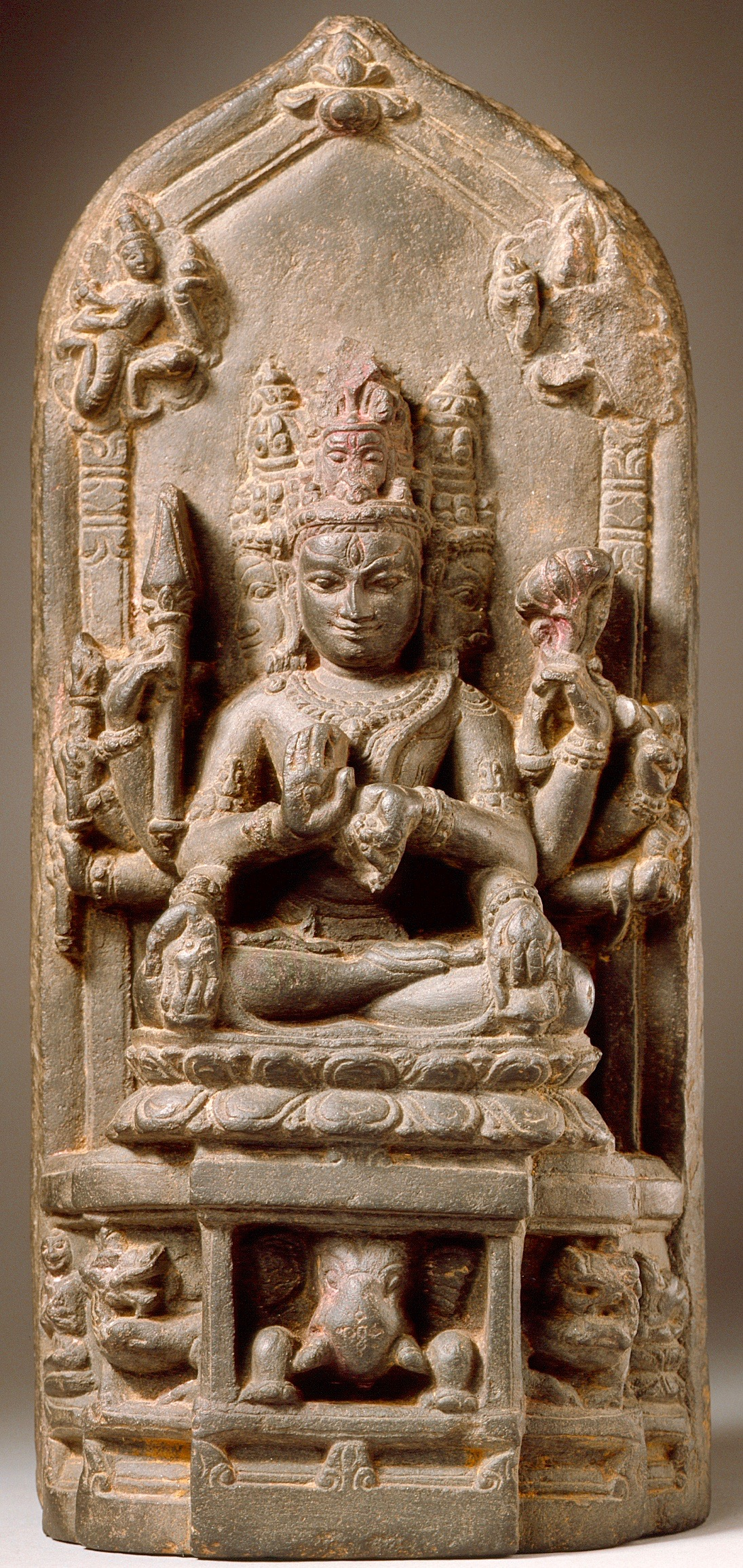
Sculpture of Śiva's Different Faces from West Bengal. 11th c. CE

Sarvamnaya Tantra (Devanagari सर्वाम्नाय तन्त्र, IAST Sarvāmnāya Tantra) is a tantric tradition originating within Nepal. Sarvāmnāya translates literally to "all transmissions." It makes reference to the āmnāya categorization system, which depicts the various streams of Kaula tantrism as "transmissions" flowing from the different faces of Śiva in different cardinal directions. This representation of Shiva with multiple or five faces is referred to as Sadasiva or Mukhalinga and is central to the Sarvamnaya tradition. The textual basis for the āmnāya categorization dates back to eleventh century Kaula texts like the Ciñciṇīmatasārasaṃuccaya and Nityāṣoḍaśīkārṇava, which began associating existing practice traditions with different directions, a practice that was further developed by subsequent texts like the Kulārṇava Tantra. These transmissions include the Pūrvāmnāya (Eastern transmission) centered around the Trika goddesses of Parā, Parāparā and Aparā, the Uttarāmnāya (Northern transmission) centered around the Kālikā Krama, the Paścimāmnāya (Western transmission) centered around the humpbacked goddess Kubjikā and her consort Navātman, the Dakṣiṇāmnāya (Southern transmission) centered around the goddess Tripurasundarī and Sri Vidya, the Urdhvāmnāya (Upper transmission) centered around the Ardhanārīśvara half-goddess/half-Śiva form, and the Adharāmnāya (Lower transmission), which includes Vajrayogini, Vajravarahi, and Ugratara of the Vajrayāna.

The defining feature of the Sarvāmnāya Tantra is that it preserved the complete ritual and meditative practices of these transmissions and integrates all these different āmnāyas into a sequence of practice. Initiates into the Sarvāmnāya receive a series of dīkśas or initiations into each of these transmissions and learn to integrate their respective mantras, yantras, mandalas, deity forms, and meditative experiences into one another to attain a deeper realization.

== Historical Context ==
The development and continuity of Sarvāmnāya Tantra to some degree reflects unique features about Kathmandu Valley in which it developed. Kathmandu Valley had received a wealth of "pan-South Asian culture" from the 5th to 8th century CE, including Nātha, Bhairava, Śaiva, and Śākta traditions. By the eleventh century, these older traditions became integrated with the tantric amnāya traditions, representing the capacity of tantric traditions to integrate and adapt. Lidke especially draws attention to the integrative dynamics occurring within the Khasa Kingdom at this time: "Drawing from Sanskritic cultures, the Khasa rulers, like their Bengali Pāla predecessors, interwove a vast array of indigenous languages, ethnic communities, and religious practices into a multileveled maṇdala structure. Within this polyethnic, multicultural network, Bengali and Kaśmirī Śākta goddesses shared the stage with Nāth Siddha deities, Purāṇic gods and goddesses, and a variety of local shamanic deities." It is within this milieu that the Sarvāmnāya practices and term became more widely utilized, until they were well-attested by the twelfth century.

Nepal provided not only an incubator for these different traditions to find integration, but a context in which these traditions could be preserved. This preservation is significant as, in other locations of crucial importance to tantra, such as Kashmir, the ritual aspect of the tantric tradition in particular contracted due to the collapse of institutional support and oppositional social climate. Nepal, however, offered several amenable features for the preservation of these traditions including a favorable climate that preserved palm-leaf manuscripts upon which texts were historically written, a vibrant community of practitioners who have continuously protected and reproduced copies of manuscripts, and a geographic location in the Kathmandu Valley that served as an important hub through which cultural products of adjoining tantric centers like Kashmir and Tibet flowed through and thus mixed. Although systematic philosophical schools did not become widespread within Nepal, as they did in Kashmir, the Nepali ritual texts reveal a corresponding philosophy that simultaneously affirms the world while seeing consciousness as the ultimate reality. The practice of Sarvāmnāya continued due to the patronage and support of royalty in Nepal, who were often themselves practitioners. In one instance, King Pratāpa Malla described six of these transmissions in a poem he wrote and had engraved into golden doors of a Śakta goddess temple in the mid-seventeenth century. Sarvāmnāya Tantra continues to be practiced both within Nepal as well as internationally.

== Agamic Sources ==
Like all tantric systems, Sarvāmnāya has scriptural foundation in the Āgamic literature. It bases its study and practice on representative āgamas from each of the transmissions it integrates, including the Pūrvāmnāya or Eastern transmission texts related to Trika (e.g., Mālinīvijayottara, Parātrīṁśikā, Siddhayogeśvarīmata, Svacchandalalitabhairava, Tantrasadbhāva), the Uttarāmnāya or Northern transmission texts related to Kālikā (e.g., Jayadrathayāmala, Kālasaṁkarṣiṇīmata, Mahākāla Saṁhitā), the Paścimāmnāya or Western transmission texts related to Kubjika (e.g., Ciñciṇīmata, Kubjikāmata, Manthānabhairava, Śrīmatottara), the Dakṣiṇāmnāya or Southern transmission texts related to Tripurasundarī (e.g., Jñānārṇava, Tantrarāja, Vāmakeśvarīmata), and the Urdhvāmnāya or Upper transmission texts related to Ardhanārīśvara (e.g., Kulārṇava Tantra).
