= Kubjika =

Hindu deity

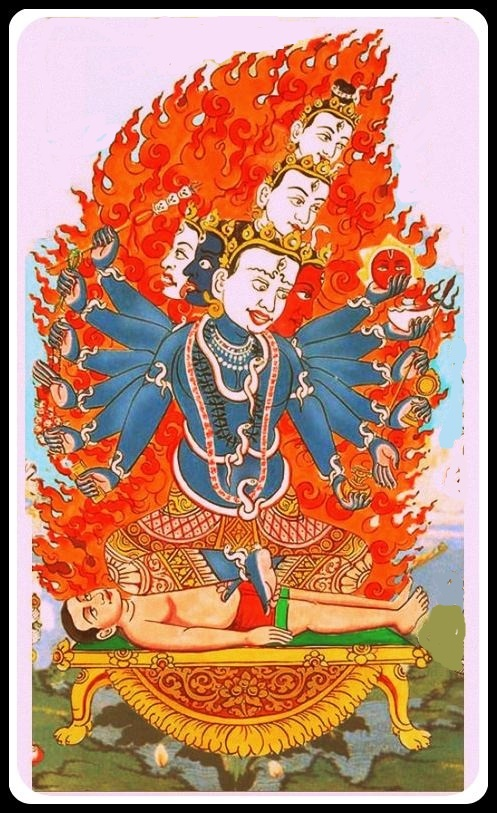
Kubjikā Mātā

Kubjika (Sanskrit: कुब्जिका IAST: Kubjikā, also known as Vakreśvarī, Vakrikā, Ciñciṇī, Kuñcikā) is the presiding goddess (kaulanāyikā) of the Kaula Paścimāmnāya (Western transmission), a tantric revelation of the non-Siddhāntika Mantra marga tradition. The worship of Kubjikā as one of the main aspect of Durga or Adi Parashakti was in its peak in 12th century CE.

== Etymology ==
Kubjikā means "to crook" or "to curve" in Sanskrit. Once lord Navātman/ Shiva embraced his consort Vakrikā and before their marriage was consummated, she suddenly felt shy and bent her body earning the name, Kubjikā, "the hunchback one" or Vakrikā (crooked one). The Ṣaṭsahāsrasaṃhitā teaches,

"O Kuleśvarī, you are the one (goddess) and (your) name accords with reality (anvartha). The goddess pervades everything within the gross, subtle, and supreme reality, which, faultless, is both manifest and unmanifest, and she is you. Do you not know that? Just as someone with a big body who moves in a small house must enter with the body bent, such is she, the Great Goddess (maheśvarī)."

This teaching shows how Kubjikā's contraction (saṃkoca) from the highest levels of consciousness to the form of a deity is a voluntary limitation that she takes on which allows her to access all places. Kubjikā is also described as being "bent" or "crooked" because she is the goddess who is most closely identified with kuṇḍalinī, the coiled serpentine energy that resides within the body, often at the base of the spine (root center), or within the navel.

== Iconography and Statues ==
Although Kubjikā is often described as being bent and crooked, Kubjikā is never depicted that way. Her traditional dhyāna (visualization) mantras often describe her with six heads and twelve arms and often in conjunction (union) with Navātman. Dr. Pongsit Pangsrivongse has recently published ground breaking insights into Kubjikā's material (mūrti) forms (statues) which have long been misidentified as Śiva-Śakti. Dr. Pangsrivongse was able to discern the correct identity of the misidentified statues by paying close attention to unpublished ritual manuals, such as the Paścimārcanapaddhati, which describes Kubjikā as follows,

"She has the colour of black collyrium and is six-faced, twelve armed. Her five faces are (arranged) like the god’s but with a sixth, very red face on her headcrest. The hunch-backed one (an epithet of Kubjikā) has a pendant belly, and thick, elevated breasts with terrifying teeth. She bears the following implements: in her right hand 1) the trident and 2) discus, (both) like the deity’s 3) a very yellow vajra 4) a red elephant goad 5) a variegated arrow 6) a dagger with a handle in the shape of a vajra and adorned with gems and gold. In her left (hands) 1) a hundred petalled blue lotus with a red stalk 2) a pronged skull-staff bearing three dried white skulls and furnished with five banners 3) a bell studded with gems and made of gold 4) a book like the deity’s 5) a yellow bow with a string made of gems 6) a white skull bowl filled with all types of ambrosia. She is laughing violently and has the form of a sixteen-year-old. She stands atop a lotus (emerging from) the navel of Svāhā. Her (principal) hands hold the dagger and skull-cup and are adorned with nāgas speckled with green and crimson dots. Except for the dagger and lotus (at the waist), her remaining ornaments are like the deity’s."

== Worship ==
The worship and veneration of Kubjikā has likely origins in the Deccan and spread all over the Indic subcontinent with strongholds of her worship in Kashmir, Rajasthan, Kashmir, Nepal, Kerala, Andhra Pradesh, and Tamiḷ Nadu. Although many scholars thought Kubjikā's worship to have long died out, in mid 1980s, scholars such as such as Dr. Dory Heilijgers-Seelen and Dr. Mark Dyczkowski learned that her worship continued to be transmitted in a secret tantric lineages that still exist among certain initiated Newar lineages in the Kathmandu Valley of Nepal and are preserved in Sarvāmnāya Tantra. What scholars were unable to see is that Kubjikā was actually already being venerated in living traditions in South India, such as Śrīvidyā, where she has been, and continues to be, worshiped as a "Samaya Vidyeśvarī" for well over 800 years.

In actuality, Kubjikā is still praised, venerated, and worshiped in many Kaula tantric traditions, including Śrīvidyā, the Kālīkula, as practiced in Bengal where she is identified with Kāmākhya, and Sarvāmnāya Tantra.

== Tantric Textual Tradition ==
=== Manthānabhairava Tantra ===
The Manthānabhairava Tantra is one of the main tantric sources for Kubjikā's Paścimāmnāya tradition. it consists a massive 24,000 verse tantra. Professor Alexis Sanderson suggests that the Manthānabhairava Tantra, along with several other Kubjikā sources including the Kubjikāmata Tantra and the Ṣaṭsāhasrasaṃhitā, was composed in the Deccan region. The Manthānabhairava Tantra consists of three sections (khaṇḍas) as follows:

- Kumārikākhaṇḍa
- Siddhakhaṇḍa
- Ādyakhaṇḍa / Yogakhaṇḍa

The Kumārikākhaṇḍa was the subject of an extended study, and English translation, that spans fourteen volumes and over 5,500 pages by Dr. Mark Dyczkowski which was published in 2009.

=== Kubjikāmata Tantra ===
The Kubjikāmata Tantra (KMT), dates to the ninth or tenth century, and is one of the primary tantric sources for Kubjikā's worship and tradition. The KMT was edited and published, in Sanskrit, by Teun Goudriaan and Jan Schoterman in 1988.

=== Ṣaṭsāhasrasaṃhitā ===
The Ṣaṭsāhasrasaṃhitā (the collection of Six-Thousand Verses) is a major canonical work in the Paścimāmnāya lineage and is considered to be an expansion of the Kubjikāmata Tantra. The text develops core doctrines and practices revealed through the on-going conversation between Bhairava (Śiva) and Kubjikā (Śakti) which a strong emphasis on the divine command (ājñā) of the initiatory transmission (dīkṣā) and the lineage of Siddhas and Nāthas belonging to the Paścimāmnāya tradition.

=== Ciñciṇīmatasārasamuccaya ===
According to the Ciñciṇīmatasārasamuccaya (CMSS), a twelve chapter tantric compendium from the Paścimāmnāya tradition. Mark Dyczkowski notes, "the CMSS is totally unconcerned with ritual, focusing instead on exalted inner states of yogic consciousness." The Kaula revelation was taught to four disciples who were sent in the four directions. The disciple sent to the west founded the Western Stream (Pascimāmnaya) of Kaulism, the cult of Navātman and Kubjikā. The eastern disciple created Purvāmnaya, the cult of Kuleśvari, while the northern disciple taught Uttarāmnaya, the cult of Kālasankarshini. the Southern tradition was known as Dakshinamnaya, the cult of Kāmeśvarī. Nowadays, the southern Śrikula sect of Kameśvari and northern Kālikula sect of Kali are still known as Shaktism sects, while the other two (Kubjikā and Trika) are usually identified as Shaiva sects along with other Kashmiri Shaiva traditions.

=== Kubjikā Upaniṣad ===
The Kubjikāmata Upaniṣad is a twenty-five chapter text attached to the Atharva Veda tradition of Upaniṣads that was critically edited, based on three manuscripts, and published with an English translation and study by Teun Goudriaan and J.A. Schoterman in 1994 as part of the Groningen Oriental Studies series. The text reveals secret mantras, maṇḍalas, and knowledge about Kubjikā and her deity pantheon, encases in both Tantric and Vedic practices and worldviews.

== See more ==
- Kashmir Shaivism
- Sarvāmnāya
- Shaktism
