= Kadavul Temple =

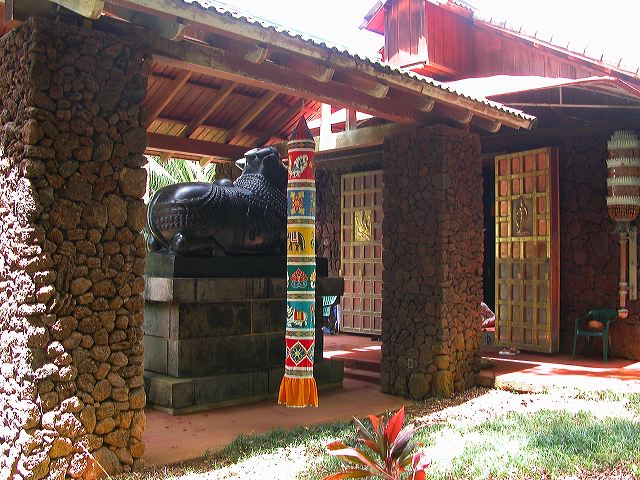
- Kadavul Temple

Religion
- Affiliation: Hinduism
- Deity: Lord Shiva

Location
- Location: Kapaʻa
- State: Hawaii
- Country: United States
- Interactive map of Kadavul Temple
- Coordinates: 22°5′18″N 159°20′16″W

Architecture
- Type: Jaffna-Style Temple
- Creator: Kauai's Hindu Monastery
- Completed: 1973

Website
- www.himalayanacademy.com

The Kadavul Temple is a Hindu temple located on the island of Kauai, Hawaii, USA. The temple is part of a larger Kauai Aadheenam Monastery, also known as the Kauai's Hindu Monastery.

The temple is dedicated to Shiva, in his form Natarja. The temple celebrates Thai Poosam, which occurs during late January/early February.

== History ==
Kadavul Temple was established by Satguru Sivaya Subramuniyaswami, a Hindu monk who was born in the United States. He was a former ballet dancer before being initiated into Shaivism by Guru Yogaswami in Sri Lanka. Satguru Sivaya Subramuniyaswami established the temple on Kauai in 1973 after he was instructed by Guru Yogaswami to build a "bridge between the East and West." The land for the temple was originally known to Native Hawaiians as Pilanakalani, also known as "the fullness of heaven."

In 2025, roofing work was done on the temple.

== Description ==
Kadavul is an ancient Tamil word for God, meaning “He who is both immanent and transcendent.” It is one of two temples in Kauai Aadheenam; the other temple is Iraivan Temple. Kadavul Temple is located next to the Wailua River and 8 km from Mount Waialeale.

== Gallery ==
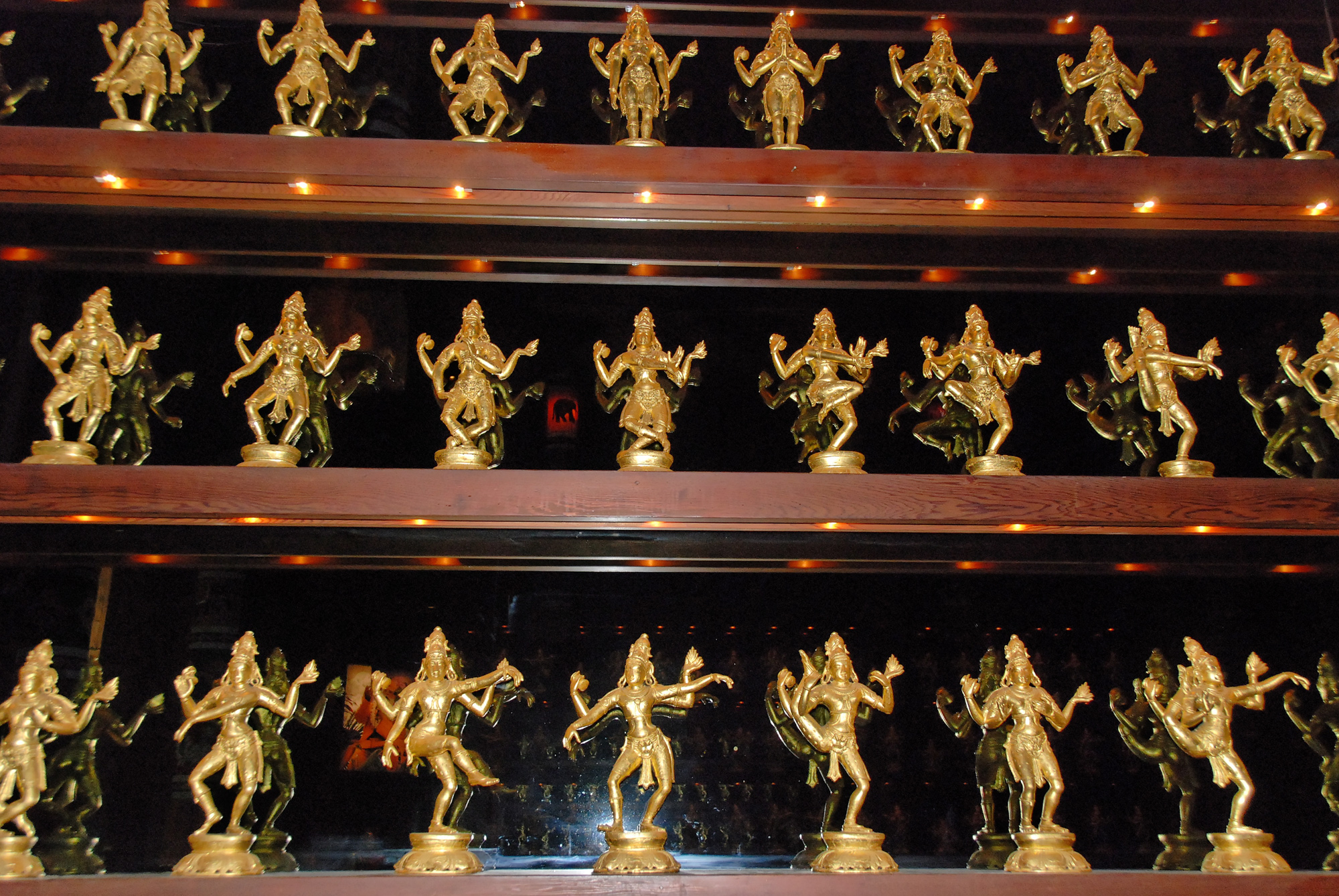
108 Karanas of Shiva's Tandava

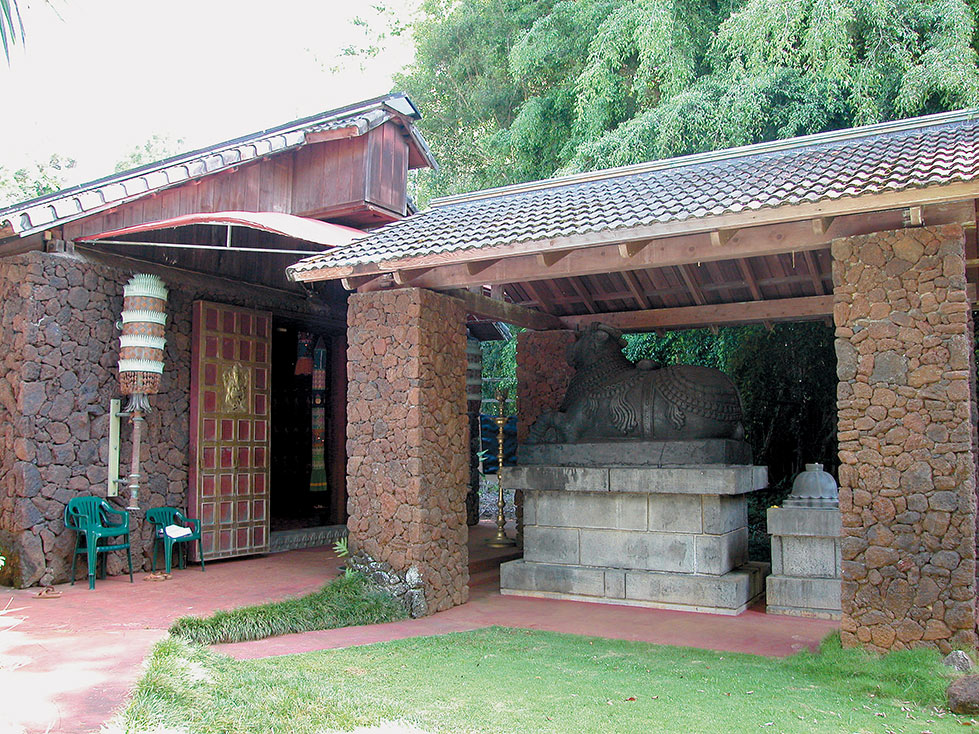
Kadavul Temple outside

== See also ==
- Sivaya Subramuniyaswami
- Bodhinatha Veylanswami
- Iraivan Temple
- Saiva Siddhanta Church
