= Agama (Hinduism) =

Collection of Hindu religious texts

The Agamas (Sanskrit: आगम, IAST: āgama, Tamil: ஆகமம்) are a collection of several Tantric literature and scriptures of Hindu schools. The term literally means tradition or "that which has come down", and the Agama texts describe cosmology, epistemology, philosophical doctrines, precepts on meditation and practices, four kinds of yoga, mantras, temple construction, deity worship and ways to attain sixfold desires. These canonical texts are in Sanskrit and Tamil.

The three main branches of Agama texts are Shaiva, Vaishnava and Shakta. The Agamic traditions are sometimes called Tantrism, although the term "Tantra" is usually used specifically to refer to Shakta Agamas. The Agama literature is voluminous, and includes 28 Shaiva Agamas, 64 Shakta Agamas (also called Tantras), and 108 Vaishnava Agamas (also called Pancharatra Samhitas), and numerous Upa-Agamas.

The origin and chronology of Agamas is unclear. Some are Vedic and others non-Vedic. Agama traditions include Yoga and Self Realization concepts, some include Kundalini Yoga, asceticism, and philosophies ranging from Dvaita (dualism) to Advaita (monism). Some suggest that these are post-Vedic texts, others as pre-Vedic compositions dating back to over 1100 BCE. Epigraphical and archaeological evidence suggests that Agama texts were in existence by about middle of the 1st millennium CE, in the Pallava dynasty era.

Scholars note that some passages in the Hindu Agama texts appear to repudiate the authority of the Vedas, while other passages assert that their precepts reveal the true spirit of the Vedas. The Agamas literary genre may also be found in Śramaṇic traditions (i.e. Buddhist, Jains, etc.). Bali Hindu tradition is officially called Agama Hindu Dharma in Indonesia.

== Etymology ==
Āgama (Sanskrit: आगम) is derived from the verbal root गम् (gam: go), preceded by the prefix आ (ā: towards, implies reverse action) jointly meaning "to come" with the noun-forming suffix अ (a) thus denotes that which has come or handed down, in other words, a traditional doctrine.

Agamam literally means "tradition", and refers to precepts and doctrines that have come down as tradition. Agama, states Dhavamony, is also a "generic name of religious texts which are at the basis of Hinduism". Other terms used for these texts can include saṃhitā (“collection”), sūtra (“aphorism”), or tantra ("system"), with the term "tantra" utilized more frequently for Shakta agamas, than for Shaiva or Vaishnava agamas.

== Significance ==
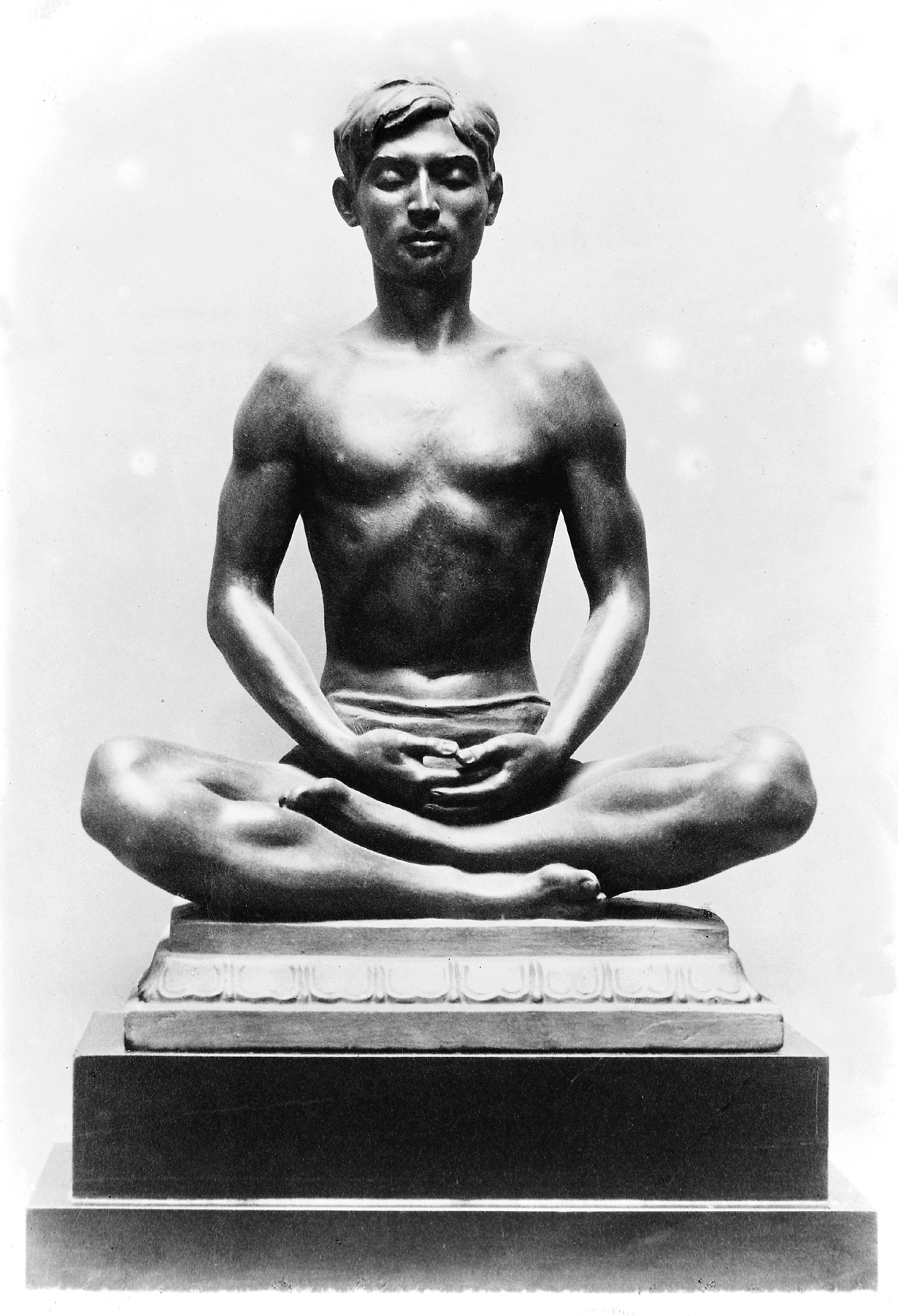
Developing physical and mental discipline with Yoga is one of four recommendations in Agama texts. Above a Yoga posture statue from Kashmir, a center of monistic Agama texts.

Agamas are structured dialogically, often as conversations between Śiva and Śakti. This dialogical format between divinities contrasts with the monologue of revelation from a single divine being to a recipient at a single place and time. This format is significant as it instead portrays spiritual insight as always ongoing, an eternal and dynamic conversation which seekers can enter into with the right cultivation of awareness. Agamas, states Rajeshwari Ghose, teach a system of spirituality involving ritual worship and ethical personal conduct through the precepts of a particular deity. The means of worship in the Agamic religions differs from the Vedic form. While the Vedic form of yajna requires no icons and shrines, the Agamic religions are based on icons with puja as a means of worship. Symbols, icons and temples are a necessary part of the Agamic practice, while non-theistic paths are alternative means of Vedic practice. Action and will drive Agama precepts, while knowledge is salvation in Vedic precepts. This, however, does not necessarily mean that Agamas and Vedas are opposed, according to medieval-era Hindu theologians. Tirumular, for example, explained their link as follows: "the Vedas are the path, and the Agamas are the horse".

Each Agama consists of four parts:

- Jnana pada, also called Vidya pada – consists of doctrine, the philosophical and spiritual knowledge, knowledge of reality and liberation.
- Yoga pada – precepts on yoga, the physical and mental discipline.
- Kriya pada – consists of rules for rituals, construction of temples (Mandir); design principles for sculpting, carving, and consecration of idols of deities for worship in temples; for different forms of initiations or diksha. This code is analogous to those in Puranas and in the Buddhist text of Sadhanamala.
- Charya pada – lays down rules of conduct, of worship (puja), observances of religious rites, rituals, festivals and prayaschittas.

The Agamas state three requirements for a place of pilgrimage: Sthala, Tirtha, and Murti. Sthala refers to the place of the temple, Tīrtha is the temple tank, and Murti refers to the image of god (usually an icon of a deity).

Elaborate rules are laid out in the Agamas for Silpa (the art of sculpture) describing the quality requirements of the places where temples are to be built, the kind of images to be installed, the materials from which they are to be made, their dimensions, proportions, air circulation, lighting in the temple complex, etc. The Manasara and Silpasara are some of the works dealing with these rules. The rituals followed in worship services each day at the temple also follow rules laid out in the Agamas.

== Philosophy ==
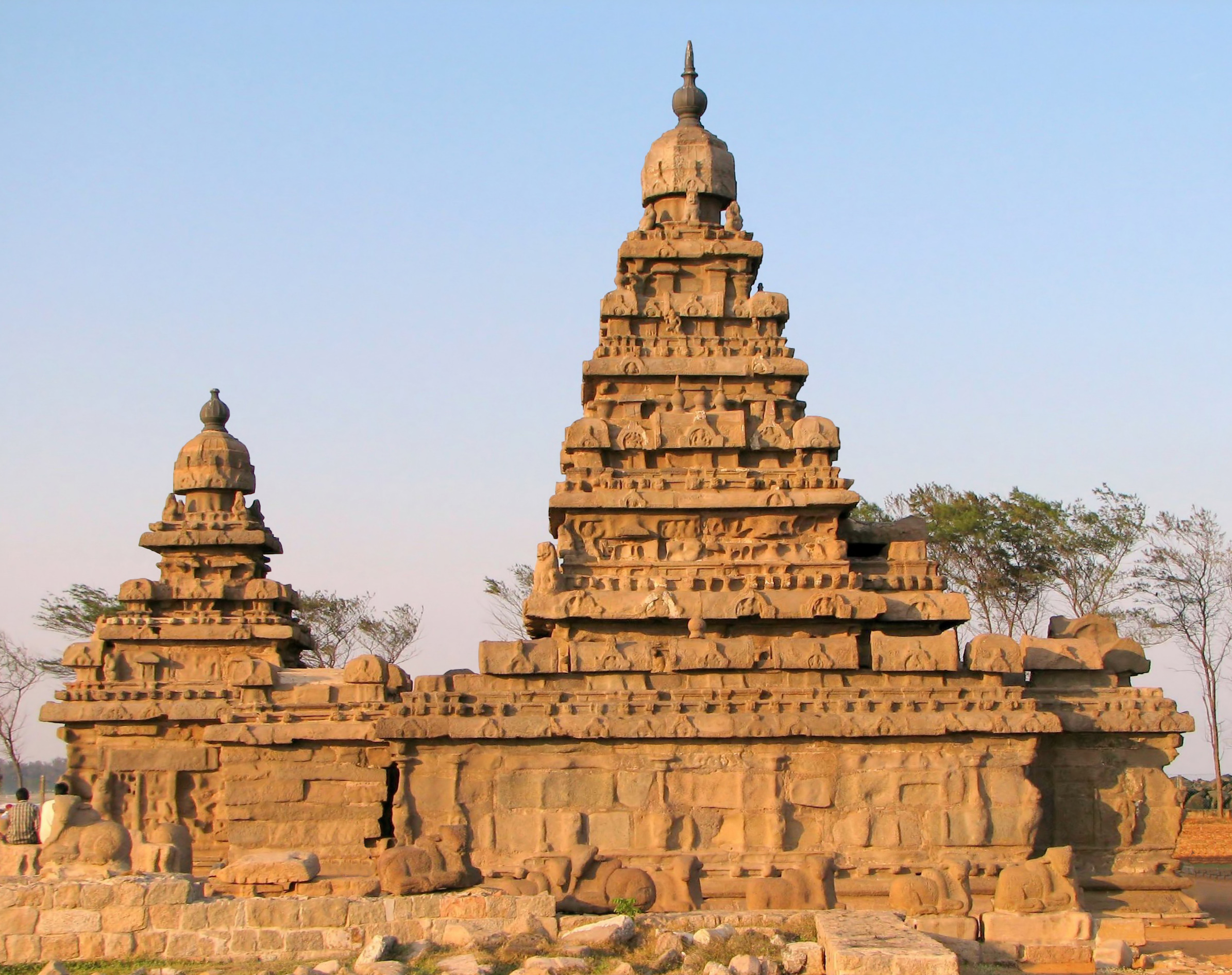
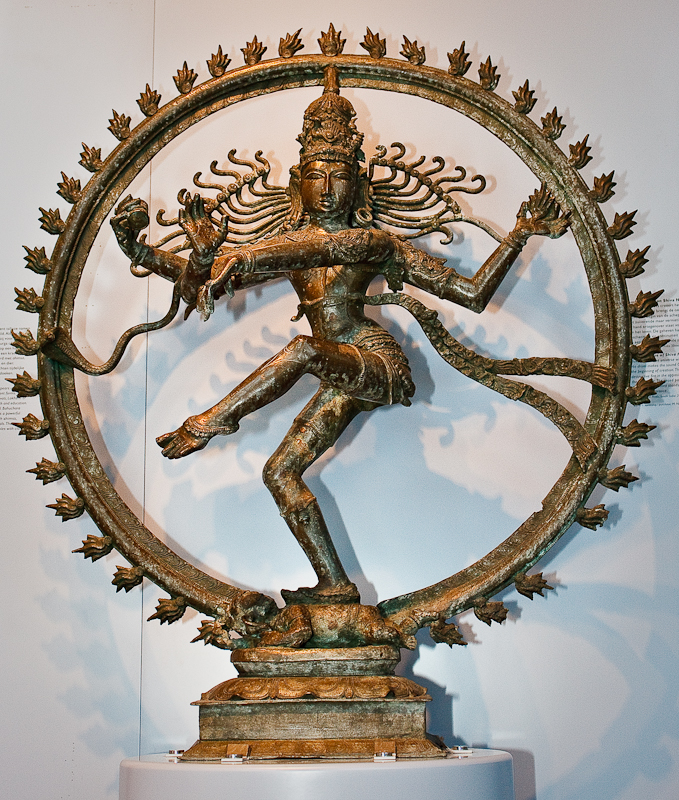
Temple design (Shore temple) and iconography such as the Nataraja (Dancing Shiva) are described in the Agama texts.

The Agama texts of Hinduism present a range of philosophies, ranging from theistic dualism to absolute monism. This diversity of views was acknowledged in Chapter 36 of Tantraloka by the 10th-century scholar Abhinavagupta. In Shaivism alone, there are ten dualistic (dvaita) Agama texts, eighteen qualified monism-cum-dualism (bhedabheda) Agama texts, and sixty-four monism (advaita) Agama texts. The Bhairava Shastras are monistic, while Shiva Shastras are dualistic.

A similar breadth of diverse views is present in Vaishnava Agamas as well. The Agama texts of Shaiva and Vaishnava schools are premised on the existence of Atman (soul, self) and the existence of an Ultimate Reality (Brahman – called Shiva in Shaivism, and Vishnu in Vaishnavism). The texts differ in the relation between the two. Some assert the dualistic philosophy of the individual soul and Ultimate Reality being different, while others state a Oneness between the two. Kashmir Shaiva Agamas posit absolute oneness, that is God (Shiva) is within man, God is within every being, God is present everywhere in the world including all non-living beings, and there is no spiritual difference between life, matter, man and God. The parallel group among Vaishnavas are the Shuddhadvaitins (pure Advaitins).

Scholars from both schools have written treatises ranging from dualism to monism. For example, Shivagrayogin has emphasized the non-difference or unity of being (between the Atman and Shivam), which is realized through stages which include rituals, conduct, personal discipline and the insight of spiritual knowledge. This bears a striking similarity, states Soni, to Shankara, Madhva and Ramanujan Vedantic discussions.

=== Relation to the Vedas and Upanishads ===
The Vedas and Upanishads are common scriptures of Hinduism, states Dhavamony, while the Agamas are sacred texts of specific sects of Hinduism. The surviving Vedic literature can be traced to the 1st millennium BCE and earlier, while the surviving Agamas can be traced to 1st millennium of the common era. The Vedic literature, in Shaivism, is primary and general, while Agamas are special treatise. In terms of philosophy and spiritual precepts, no Agama that goes against the Vedic literature, states Dhavamony, will be acceptable to the Shaivas. Similarly, the Vaishnavas treat the Vedas along with the Bhagavad Gita as the main scripture, and the Samhitas (Agamas) as exegetical and exposition of the philosophy and spiritual precepts therein. The Shaktas have a similar reverence for the Vedic literature and view the Tantras (Agamas) as the fifth Veda.

The heritage of the Agamas, states Krishna Shivaraman, was the "Vedic piety maturing in the monism of the Upanishads presenting the ultimate spiritual reality as Brahman and the way to realizing as portrayed in the Gita".

The Veda is the cow, the true Agama its milk.

— Umapati, Translated by David Smith

== Texts ==
=== Shaiva and Shakta Agamas ===
There are multiple frameworks for organizing the agamas. One of which, building on distinctions introduced by Abhinavagupta, places the Shaiva and Shakta agamas on a continuum from those that are dualistic, Śiva-centered, and non-transgressive to those that are non-dualistic, Śakti-centered, and transgressive. In this framework, the Śaiva Siddhānta agamas (which can be subdivided into 10 Śaiva and 18 Rudra āgamas, arranged into a common list of 28 āgamas below) feature on the dualistic, Śiva-centered, and non-transgressive side. In the middle falls the 64 Bhairava agamas (which can be subdivided into the Amṛteśvara and Mantrapīṭha). And, on the most non-dualistic, Śakti-centered, and transgressive side are the Vidyapīṭha tantras (including the Yāmalas, Trika, and Kālīkula). In this way, the Shakta Agamas are inextricably related to the Shaiva Agamas, with their respective focus on Shakti with Shiva in Shakta Tantra and on Shiva in Shaiva texts. DasGupta states that the Shiva and Shakti are "two aspects of the same truth – static and dynamic, transcendent and immanent, male and female", and neither is real without the other. Shiva's dynamic power is Shakti and she has no existence without him, she is the highest truth and he the manifested essence.

1. Kamikam
2. Yogajam
3. Chintyam
4. Karanam
5. Ajitham
6. Deeptham
7. Sukskmam
8. Sahasram
9. Ashuman
10. Suprabedham
11. Vijayam
12. Nishwasam
13. Swayambhuvam
14. Analam
15. Veeram
16. Rouravam
17. Makutam
18. Vimalam
19. Chandragnanam
20. Bimbam
21. Prodgeetham
22. Lalitham
23. Sidham
24. Santhanam
25. Sarvoktham
26. Parameshwaram
27. Kiranam
28. Vathulam
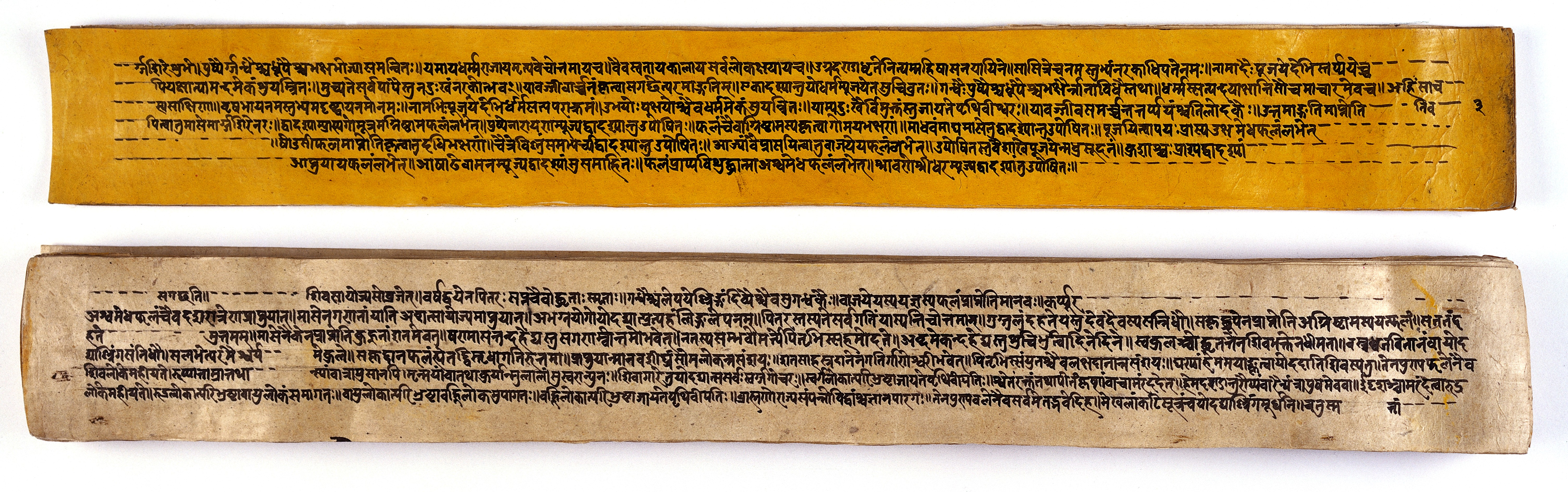
Parts of the Nihsvasatattvasamhita manuscript from Nepal, reproduced in 1912 from a palm-leaf original, linking Shaiva Agama to esoteric Tantra.

==== Shaiva Siddhanta ====
The Shaiva Agamas led to the Shaiva Siddhanta philosophy in Tamil-speaking regions of South India. Of the 28 agamas, the Pārameśa, Niśvāsa, Svāyambhuva[sūtrasaṅgraha], Raurava[sūtrasaṅgraha], Kiraṇa, and Par[ākhya]/Saurabheya all have surviving copies that are demonstrably pre-twelfth century. Many of these agamas have been translated and published by the Himalayan Academy. The Shaiva Siddhanta also relies on four agamas that do not figure into this canonical list of 28 (the Kālottara, Mataṅga-pārameśvara, Mṛgendra, and Sarvajñānottara) along with two pratiṣṭhā-tantras (Mayasaṅgraha and Mohacūḍottara). The writings of Tirumular and the lineage of Siddhars, such as those compiled in the Tirumurai, also play a crucial textual role in this tradition. In the Siddhanta, āgamās are seen as the twofold wisdom of Śiva, consisting of mantra and realization, that liberates the individual selves from the threefold bondage of mala, māyā, and karma.

==== Kashmir Shaivism ====
The Kashmir Shaivism lineage draws freely upon the 10 Saiva, 18 Rudra, and 64 Bhairava agamas, seeing them as a progression from dualistic, partially non-dualistic, and non-dualistic, while also integrating the Śakta tantras. Of the Bhairava agamas, two stand out: the Netra Tantra of the Amṛteśvara set of agamas and the Svacchanda Tantra of the Mantrapīṭha set of agamas. Both were commented upon freely by Kashmiri Shaiva exegetes, like Kṣemarāja and continue to have practical importance to this day. From the Shakta tantras, Kashmir Shaivism draws primarily on Trika texts, primarily Mālinīvijayottara, as well as the Siddhayogeśvarīmata, Tantrasadbhāva, Parātrīśikā, and Vijñāna Bhairava. Abhinavagupta and Kṣemarāja regard āgamas non-dualistically, as the self-revealing act of Śiva, who assumes the roles of preceptor and disciple, and reveals Tantra according to the interests of different subjects. The āgamas are thereby further equated with prakāśa-vimarśa, the capacity of consciousness to reflect back upon itself through its own expressions. The literature of Kashmir Shaivism is divided under three categories: Agama shastra, Spanda shastra, and Pratyabhijna shastra. In addition to these agamas, Kashmir Shaivism further relies on exegetical work developing Vasugupta's (850 CE) influential Shiva Sutras that inaugurated the spanda tradition and Somananda's (875–925 CE) Śivadṛṣṭi, which set the stage for the pratyabhijñā tradition. These texts are both said to be revealed under spiritual circumstances. For instance, Kallata in Spanda-vritti and Kshemaraja in his commentary Vimarshini state that Shiva revealed the secret doctrines to Vasugupta while Bhaskara in his Varttika says a Siddha revealed the doctrines to Vasugupta in a dream.

==== Shakta Agamas ====
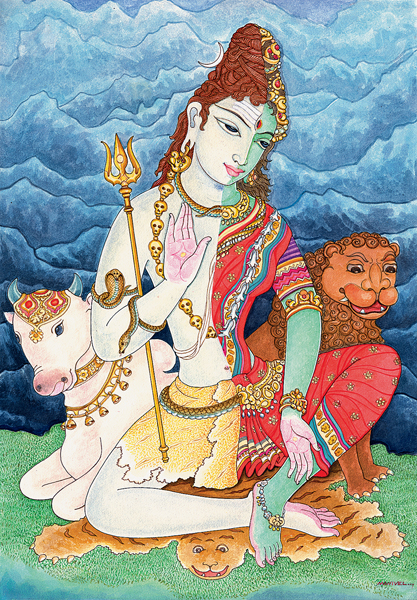
The Shakta Agamas deploy Shiva and Shakti, and a unified view as the foundation for spiritual knowledge.

The Shakta Agamas are commonly known as Tantras, and they are imbued with reverence for the feminine, representing goddess as the focus and treating the female as equal and essential part of the cosmic existence. The feminine Shakti (literally, energy and power) concept is found in the Vedic literature, but it flowers into extensive textual details only in the Shakta Agamas. These texts emphasize the feminine as the creative aspect of a male divinity, cosmogonic power and all pervasive divine essence. The theosophy, states Rita Sherma, presents the masculine and feminine principle in a "state of primordial, transcendent, blissful unity". The feminine is the will, the knowing and the activity, she is not only the matrix of creation, she is creation. Unified with the male principle, in these Hindu sect's Tantra texts, the female is the Absolute.

The Shakta Agamas or Shakta tantras are 64 in number. Krishnananda Agamavagisha has compiled 64 agamas in a single volume named Brihat Tantrasara. Some of the older Tantra texts in this genre are called Yamalas, which literally denotes, states Teun Goudriaan, the "primeval blissful state of non-duality of Shiva and Shakti, the ultimate goal for the Tantric Sadhaka".

The Shakta tantras, each of which emphasize a different goddess, developed into several transmissions (āmnāyas), which, in turn, are connected symbolically with one of the four, five, or six directional faces of Shiva, depending on the text being consulted. When counted in four directions, these transmissions include the Pūrvāmnāya (Eastern transmission) featuring the Trika goddesses of Parā, Parāparā and Aparā, the Uttarāmnāya (Northern transmission) featuring the Kālikā Krama, the Paścimāmnāya (Western transmission) featuring the humpbacked goddess Kubjikā and her consort Navātman, and the Dakṣiṇāmnāya (Southern transmission) featuring the goddess Tripurasundarī and Sri Vidya. In Nepal, these transmissions have not only been preserved among the Newar tantric community, but as early as the 12th century, these transmissions were arranged into a sequence of practice within the Sarvāmnāya tradition. In the Sarvāmnāya tradition, initiates are sequentially initiated into each of the transmissions, where they learn to integrate each goddess with all the others, to understand and experience Shakti holistically.

=== Vaishnava Agamas ===
The Vaishnava Agamas are found into two main schools – Pancharatra and Vaikhanasas. While Vaikhanasa Agamas were transmitted from Vikhanasa Rishi to his disciples Bhrigu, Marichi, Atri and Kashyapa, the Pancharatra Agamas are classified into three: Divya (from Vishnu), Munibhaashita (from Muni, sages), and Aaptamanujaprokta (from sayings of trustworthy men).

==== Vaikhanasa Agama ====
Maharishi Vikhanasa is considered to have guided the compilation of a set of Agamas named Vaikhānasa Agama. Sage Vikhanasa is conceptualized as a mind-born creation, i.e., Maanaseeka Utbhavar of Lord Narayana. Originally Vikhanasa passed on the knowledge to nine disciples in the first manvantara -- Atri, Bhrigu, Marichi, Kashyapa, Vasishta, Pulaha, Pulasthya, Krathu and Angiras. However, only those of Bhrigu, Marichi, Kashyapa and Atri are extant today. The four rishis are said to have received the cult and knowledge of Vishnu from the first Vikhanasa, i.e., the older Brahma in the Svayambhuva Manvanthara. Thus, the four sages Atri, Bhrigu, Marichi, and Kashyapa are considered the propagators of vaikhānasa śāstra. A composition by Sage Vikhanasa's disciple Marichi, namely, Ananda-Samhita states Vikhanasa prepared the Vaikhanasa Sutra according to a branch of Yajurveda and was Brahma himself.

The extant texts of Vaikhānasa Agama number 28 in total and are known from the texts Vimānārcakakalpa and Ānanda saṃhitā, both composed by Marīci, which enumerate them. They are:

The 13 Adhikaras authored by Bhrigu are khilatantra, purātantra, vāsādhikāra, citrādhikāra, mānādhikāra, kriyādhikāra, arcanādhikāra, yajnādhikāra, varṇādhikāra, prakīrnṇādhikāra, pratigrṛhyādhikāra, niruktādhikāra and khilādhikāra. However, ānanda saṃhitā attributes ten works to Bhrigu, namely khila, khilādhikāra, purādhikāra, vāsādhikāraṇa, arcanādhikaraṇa, mānādhikaraṇa, kriyādhikāra, niruktādhikāra, prakīrnṇādhikāra and yajnādhikāra.

The eight Saṃhitās authored by Marīci are Jaya saṃhitā, Ananda saṃhitā, Saṃjnāna saṃhitā, Vīra saṃhitā, Vijaya saṃhitā, Vijita saṃhitā, Vimala saṃhitā and Jnāna saṃhitā. However, ānanda saṃhitā attributes the following works to Marīci: jaya saṃhitā, ānanda saṃhitā, saṃjnāna saṃhitā, vīra saṃhitā, vijaya saṃhitā, vijita saṃhitā, vimala saṃhitā and kalpa saṃhitā.

The three Kandas authored by Kashyapa are Satyakāṇḍa, Tarkakāṇḍa, Jnānakāṇḍa. However, Ananda Saṃhitā attributes the satyakāṇḍa, karmakāṇḍa and jnānakāṇḍa to Kashyapa.

The four tantras authored by Atri are Pūrvatantra, Atreyatantra, Viṣṇutantra and Uttaratantra. However, Ananda Saṃhitā attributes the pūrvatantra, viṣṇutantra, uttaratantra and mahātantra to Atri.

==== Pancharatra Agama ====
Like the Vaikhanasa Agama, the Pancharatra Agama, the Viswanatha Agama is centered around the worship of Lord Vishnu. While the Vaikhansa deals primarily with Vaidhi Bhakti, the Pancharatra Agama teaches both vaidhi and Raganuga bhakti.

=== Soura Agamas ===
The Soura or Saura Agamas comprise one of the six popular agama-based religions of Shaiva, Vaishnava, Shakta, Ganapatya, Kaumara and Soura. The Saura Tantras are dedicated to the sun (Surya) and Soura Agamas are in use in temples of Sun worship.

=== Ganapatya Agamas ===
The Paramanada Tantra mentions the number of sectarian tantras as 6,000 for Vaishnava, 10,000 for Shaiva, 100,000 for Shakta, 1,000 for Ganapatya, 2,000 for Saura, 7,000 for Bhairava, and 2,000 for Yaksha-bhutadi-sadhana.

== History and chronology ==
The chronology and history of Agama texts is unclear. The surviving Agama texts were likely composed in the 1st millennium CE, likely existed by the 5th century CE. However, scholars such as Ramanan refer to the archaic prosody and linguistic evidence to assert that the beginning of the Agama literature goes back to about 5th century BCE, in the decades after the death of Buddha.

Temple and archaeological inscriptions, as well as textual evidence, suggest that the Agama texts were in existence by the 7th century in the Pallava dynasty era. However, Richard Davis notes that the ancient Agamas "are not necessarily the Agamas that survive in modern times". The texts have gone through revision over time.

== See also ==
- Āgama (Buddhism)
- Jain Agamas (Śvētāmbara)
- Jain Agamas (Digambara)
- Sacred geometry

== Sources ==
- Satguru Sivaya Subramuniyaswami (November 2003) [1979]. "Glossary". Dancing with Shiva, Hinduism's Contemporary Catechism (Sixth ed.). Kapaa, HI: Himalayan Academy. p. 755. ISBN 0-945497-96-2. Archived from the original on 2006-03-22.
